= Peter Rothe =

German art director (born 1935)

- Born: 5 October 1935 (age 90); Altenburg, Germany
- Occupation: Art director
- Years active: 1965-1994 (film & TV)

Peter Rothe (born 1935) is a German art director who worked designing sets in the German film and television industries. He worked on a number of production by Wolf C. Hartwig's Rapid Film during the 1970s.

== Selected filmography ==
- Countdown to Doomsday (1966)
- Lotus Flowers for Miss Quon (1967)
- Emma Hamilton (1968)
- The Young Tigers of Hong Kong (1969)
- Jailbreak in Hamburg (1971)
- Mädchen, die nach München kommen (1972)
- Love in 3D (1973)
- The Girl from Hong Kong (1973)
- The Hunter of Fall (1974)
- The Mimosa Wants to Blossom Too (1976)
- Women in Hospital (1977)
- The Man in the Rushes (1978)
- Just a Gigolo (1978)
- Randale (1983)
- Moscow on the Hudson (1984)
- Please, Let the Flowers Live (1986)

== Bibliography ==
- Peter Cowie & Derek Elley. World Filmography: 1967. Fairleigh Dickinson University Press, 1977.
