= Heinz Engelmann =

German actor

- UFA autograph card
- Born: 14 January 1911; Berlin, German Empire
- Died: 26 September 1996 (aged 85); Tutzing, Bavaria, Germany
- Other name: Heinrich Georg Ludwig Engelmann
- Occupation: Actor
- Years active: 1938–1985 (film)

Heinz Engelmann (14 January 1911 – 26 September 1996) was a German film actor. He was married to the actress Gertrud Meyen. During World War II, Engelmann served in the German Army with an anti-aircraft artillery unit. He was later taken as a prisoner of war by American Allies.

== Selected filmography ==
- Two Friends (1938)
- Pour le Mérite (1938) - Kürassier
- Drei Unteroffiziere (1939) - Leutnant Strehl
- D III 88 (1939) - Lt. Frank
- Congo Express (1939) - Raoul Burell
- The Girl at the Reception (1940)
- Am Abend auf der Heide (1941) - Jürgen Holsten
- Heimkehr (1941) - Deutscher Soldat
- U-Boote westwärts (1941) - Oberleutnant zur See Wiegandt
- The Big Game (1942) - Torwart Jupp Jäger
- Blocked Signals (1948) - Klaus Kröger - Steuermann
- Harbour Melody (1949) - Heinrich Osthaus
- Derby (1949) - Dr. Dieter Benningsen
- Das Geheimnis des Hohen Falken (1950) - Wenggraf - Jourenalist
- Seitensprünge im Schnee (1950) - Thomas Enderlin
- Border Post 58 (1951) - Grenzoberjäger Reitlechner
- Die Frauen des Herrn S. (1951) - Philtas
- The Cloister of Martins (1951) - Eberwein, Propst von Berchtesgaden
- The Girl with the Whip (1952) - (uncredited)
- All Clues Lead to Berlin (1952) - Kommissar Max Lüdecke
- Das Geheimnis vom Bergsee (1953)
- Annie from Tharau (1954) - Ulrich Lessau
- Three from Variety (1954)
- Ein Mann vergißt die Liebe (1955)
- The Blacksmith of St. Bartholomae (1955) - Martin
- The Hunter from Roteck (1956)
- Melody of the Heath (1956) - Dr. Martin Newiger
- Made in Germany (1957) - Dr. Otto Schott
- Sharks and Little Fish (1957) - Flottillenchef Erich Wegener
- U 47 – Kapitänleutnant Prien (1958) - (uncredited)
- Stahlnetz (1959-1968, TV Series, 7 episodes)
  - Aktenzeichen: Welcker u. a. wegen Mordes (1959) - Kriminalkommissar Dressler
  - E ... 605 (1960) - Kriminalkommissar Opitz
  - In der Nacht zum Dienstag ... (1961) - Kriminalkommissar Kiesel
  - In jeder Stadt … (1962) - Kriminaloberkommissar Bade
  - Spur 211 (1962) - Kriminaloberkommissar Semmler
  - Rehe (1964) - Kriminalkommissar Berenthin
  - Ein Toter zuviel (1968) - Kriminalhauptkommissar Heinz Schilling
- Herr Puntila and His Servant Matti (1960) - Matti Altonen
- Satan Tempts with Love (1960) - Kapitän Philipp
- When the Heath Is in Bloom (1960) - Förster Harkort
- The Inn on the River (1962) - Mr. Broen
- Between Shanghai and St. Pauli (1962) - Carlo Giustini (narrator, uncredited)
- The Pirates of the Mississippi (1963) - Tom QuinthyTom Cook (narrator, uncredited)
- Mission to Hell (1964) - Joe Warren (narrator, uncredited)
- Massacre at Marble City (1964) - Phil Stone (narrator, uncredited)
- The Seventh Victim (1964) - Inspector Bradley
- Among Vultures (1964) - Old Surehand (narrator, uncredited)
- Black Eagle of Santa Fe (1965) - Cliff McPherson (narrator, uncredited)
- Tread Softly (1965) - Jerry Cotton (narrator, uncredited)
- Old Surehand (1965) - Old Surehand (narrator, uncredited)
- 4 Schlüssel (1966) - Kriminalkommissar
- The Trap Snaps Shut at Midnight (1966) - Jerry Cotton (narrator, uncredited)
- Förster Horn (1966, TV Series) - Albert Horn
- More (1969) - Dr. Ernesto
- Junger Herr auf altem Hof (1969-1970, TV Series, 13 episodes) - Christian Grothe
- All People Will Be Brothers (1973) - Professor Mohn (narrator, uncredited)
- Cross of Iron (1977) - Oberst (Col.) Brandt (German version, narrator, uncredited)
- Morenga (1985) - Deimling (narrator, uncredited) (final film role)
