= Véronique Vendell =

French actress (born 1942)

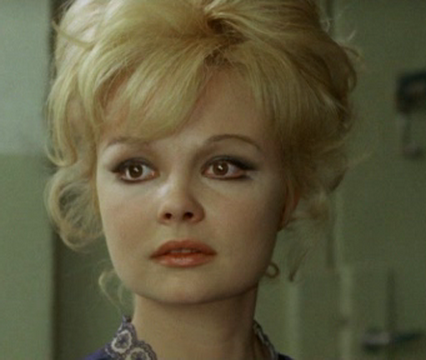
- Born: Véronique Duraffourd; 21 July 1942 (age 83); Montpellier, France
- Occupation: Actress
- Years active: 1961–1979
- Spouse: Wolf C. Hartwig (?-2017 (his death))

Véronique Vendell (born Claude Marie Rose Duraffourd, 21 July 1942) is a French actress. She appeared mainly in French and German productions, but had roles in both Peter Glenville's Becket and Sam Peckinpah's Cross of Iron and its sequel Breakthrough.

== Early life ==
Claude Marie Rose Duraffourd, was born on 21 July 21, 1942, in Lodève, Occitania, (near Montpellier) to a mother and father who were both doctors.

== Career ==
The two movies she appears in with Peter O'Toole, she plays his lover or would-be lover: these are Becket and The Night of the Generals. She also had a prominent role in Code 7, Victim 5.

== Filmography ==
- Becket (1964)
- Code 7, Victim 5! (1964)
- Dalia and the Sailors (1964)
- When the Pheasants Pass (1965)
- Kiss Me General (1966)
- The Night of the Generals (1967)
- Tower of Screaming Virgins (1968)
- Barbarella (1968)
- Mayerling (1968)
- I See Naked (1969)
- The Young Tigers of Hong Kong (1969)
- Moonlighting Mistress (1970)
- Holiday Report (1971)
- La supertestimone (1971)
- The Girl from Hong Kong (1973)
- Cross of Iron (1977)
- Breakthrough (1979)
