= Ernst Hofbauer =

Austrian film director (1925–1984)

Ernst Hofbauer (22 August 1925 – 24 February 1984) was an Austrian film director.

== Biography ==
Hofbauer was born on 22 August 1925 in Vienna, Austria. He began his career as an assistant director in 1950 with Der keusche Adam. His first film as a director was a sequence of the Austrian anthology film Auch Männer sind keine Engel (a.k.a. Wiener Luft, 1959).

Hofbauer's next film was a Krimi film Tim Frazer and the Mysterious Mister X in 1964 that he also wrote. He worked steadily in a variety of popular genres of the international co-productions of the time, musicals with Vivi Bach such as Holiday in St. Tropez (1964) and Tausend Takte Übermut (1965), a Sauerkraut Western Black Eagle of Santa Fe (1965), a Eurospy film Red Dragon (1965), then moving to adult films with The Fountain of Love and Black Market of Love both in 1966; the latter with a screenplay by Hofbauer, followed by Hot Pavements of Cologne (1967) and The Young Tigers of Hong Kong (1969).

During the early 1970s, in Munich, Hofbauer teamed with Walter Boos, Wolf C. Hartwig and Ludwig Spitaler to produce the original thirteen films under the banner Schulmadchen Report (or Schoolgirl Report); the stories were adapted from books written by Günther Hunold, while Günther Heller composed the film script, Klaus Werner did the camera work, and the music was handled by Gert Wilden & Orchestra. Hofbauer and Boos were referred to as the 'Titans of Teen Libido'. The films were classified as 'sexploitation', and were extremely popular, seen by more than 30 million people all over the world.

In the United States, the films were released in grindhouses and drive-ins, and the names of the films were changed to conform to American standards. Because the films focused on young girls who may have been under the legal age in this country, the Schoolgirl Report series was eventually suppressed.

He died on 24 February 1984 in Munich, West Germany.

== Films ==
A chronological list of the original 13 Schoolgirl Report films follows:

- Schulmadchen Report I: What Parents Don't Think is Possible, a.k.a. Schoolgirl Report Part I (1970)
- Schulmadchen Report II: What Keeps Parents Awake at Night, a.k.a. Schoolgirl Report Part II (1971)
- Schulmadchen Report III: What Parents Find Unthinkable, a.k.a. Schoolgirls Growing Up (1972)
- Schulmadchen Report IV: What Drives Parents to Despair, a.k.a. Campus Swingers (1972)
- Schulmadchen Report V: What All Parents Should Know (1973)
- Schulmadchen Report VI: Erotic Young Lovers, a.k.a. Campus Pussycats (1973)
- Schulmadchen Report VII: But Heart Needs to Be There, a.k.a. Teenage Playmates (1974)
- Schulmadchen Report VIII: What Parents Should Never Get to Know, a.k.a. Naughty Coeds (1974)
- Schulmadchen Report IX: Examination Before the Matriculation (1975, dir. Walter Boos)
- Schulmadchen Report X: Every Girl Starts Sometime, a.k.a. Sexy Schoolwork (1976, dir. Walter Boos)
- Schulmadchen Report XI: Trying Beats Studying, a.k.a. Blue Dreams, a.k.a. Confessions of a Naked Virgin (1977)
- Schulmadchen Report XII: Young Girls Need Love, a.k.a. Blue Fantasies (1978, dir. Walter Boos)
- Schulmadchen Report XIII: Don't Forget The Love When Having Sex (1980, dir. Walter Boos)

In addition to the original Schulmadchen Report films, Ernst Hofbauer directed several other erotic movies featuring adult as well as young actresses. A partial list of these films is shown below:

- Prostitution heute (1970)
- The Teeny Boppers, a.k.a. Girls at the Gynecologist (Mädchen beim Frauenarzt, 1971)
- Office Girls (Erotik im Beruf – Was jeder Personalchef gern verschweigt, 1971)
- Swinging Wives (Der neue heiße Sex-Report – Was Männer nicht für möglich halten, 1971)
- Holiday Report (Urlaubsreport – Worüber Reiseleiter nicht sprechen dürfen, 1971)
- The Disciplined Woman (Die dressierte Frau, 1972)
- Lehrmädchen-Report (1972)
- Housewives on the Job (Hausfrauen-Report international, 1973)
- Secrets of Sweet Sixteen (Was Schulmädchen verschweigen, 1973)
- 14 and Under (Frühreifen-Report, 1973)
- Bedtime Stories for Grownups (Wenn die prallen Möpse hüpfen, 1974)
- Virgins of the Seven Seas (1974; a.k.a. U.S. title "The Bod Squad") for the Shaw Brothers (HK) Ltd.
- Rasputin (1984)

Walter Boos, Wolf C. Hartwig, and Ludwig Spitaler teamed with Ernst Hofbauer in the production of the Schoolgirl Report films. After Hofbauer finished directing the series, Boos and Hartwig continued directing subsequent films in the genre. The following films were produced and directed after Hofbauer turned over the reins to his co-workers:

- Should a Schoolgirl Tell (Josefine, das liebestolle Kätzchen, 1969, dir. Géza von Cziffra)
- Housewife Report (Hausfrauen-Report, 1971, dir. Eberhard Schröder)
- Most Girls Will (Hausfrauen-Report 2, 1971, dir. Eberhard Schröder)
- The Sensuous Housewife (Hausfrauen-Report 3, 1972, dir. Eberhard Schröder)
- Swinging Coeds (Mädchen, die nach München kommen, 1972, dir. Walter Boos)
- The Intimate Teenagers (Schlüsselloch-Report, 1973, dir. Walter Boos)
- Wide Open Marriage (Hausfrauen-Report 4, 1973, dir. Eberhard Schröder, Quirin Steinar)
- Train Station Pickups (Die Schulmädchen vom Treffpunkt Zoo, 1979, dir. Walter Boos)
