= Mystery of the Red Jungle =

1964 film

- Directed by: Helmut Ashley
- Written by: Werner P. Zibaso
- Produced by: Wolf C. Hartwig
- Starring: Maria Perschy
- Cinematography: Klaus von Rautenfeld
- Edited by: Herbert Taschner; Paolo Vochicievich (Italian version)
- Music by: Willy Mattes
- Release dates: 20 March 1964 (West Germany); 28 June 1964 (France); 12 August 1964 (Italy)
- Countries: West Germany; France; Italy
- Language: German

Mystery of the Red Jungle (German: Weiße Fracht für Hongkong, French: Le mystère de la jongue rouge, Italian: Da 077: criminali ad Hong Kong, also known as Operation Hong Kong) is a 1964 German-French-Italian adventure-spy film directed by Helmut Ashley and starring Maria Perschy, Dietmar Schönherr, and Brad Harris.

== Cast ==
- Maria Perschy as Claudia Laudon
- Dietmar Schönherr as Ted Barnekow
- Brad Harris as Larry McLean
- Horst Frank as Robert Perkins
- Philippe Lemaire as Laurent
- Lilly Mantovani as Nancy Lee
- Mario Lanfranchi as Colonel Strong
- Dorothee Parker as Susan Collins
- Pascale Roberts as Margaret Perkins
