= The Black Panther of Ratana =

1963 film

- Directed by: Jürgen Roland
- Written by: Roberto Bianchi Montero; Johannes Kai; Giorgio Simonelli
- Produced by: Wolf C. Hartwig; Ludwig Spitaler
- Starring: Marianne Koch; Heinz Drache; Horst Frank
- Cinematography: Klaus von Rautenfeld
- Edited by: Herbert Taschner
- Music by: Marcello Giombini; Gert Wilden
- Production companies: Cinematografica Associati; Rapid Film
- Distributed by: Constantin Film
- Release date: 15 March 1963
- Running time: 94 minutes
- Countries: West Germany; Italy
- Language: German

The Black Panther of Ratana (German: Der schwarze Panther von Ratana) is a 1963 West German-Italian adventure film directed by Jürgen Roland and starring Marianne Koch, Heinz Drache, and Horst Frank.

The film's sets were designed by the art director Hans Berthel. It was shot on location in Thailand.

== Cast ==
- Marianne Koch as Dr. Marina Keller
- Heinz Drache as Richard Paddberg
- Horst Frank as Jack Roller
- Chris Howland as Charly
- Brad Harris as Larry Finch
- Luciana Gilli as Yvonne
- Dorothee Parker as Madeleine
- Carlo Tamberlani as Pater Antonio
- Robert Klupp
- Osman Ragheb
- Akom Mokranond
- Ignazio Dolce

== Bibliography ==
- Bock, Hans-Michael; Bergfelder, Tim, eds. (2009). The Concise Cinegraph: Encyclopaedia of German Cinema. New York: Berghahn Books. ISBN 978-1-57181-655-9.
