= Wolfgang Becker =

Wolfgang Becker may refer to:

- Wolfgang Becker (director, born 1910) (1910–2005), German film director and film editor
- Wolfgang Becker (director, born 1954) (1954–2024), German film director and screenwriter
