= Satan Tempts with Love =

1960 film

- Directed by: Rudolf Jugert
- Written by: Ilse Lotz-Dupont
- Produced by: Wolf C. Hartwig
- Starring: Belinda Lee; Joachim Hansen; Ivan Desny
- Cinematography: Georg Krause
- Edited by: Herbert Taschner
- Music by: Werner Scharfenberger
- Production company: Rapid Film
- Distributed by: Union-Film
- Release date: 31 March 1960
- Running time: 90 minutes
- Countries: France; West Germany
- Language: German

Satan Tempts with Love (German: Der Satan lockt mit Liebe) is a 1960 French-West German crime film directed by Rudolf Jugert and starring Belinda Lee, Joachim Hansen and Ivan Desny.

It was known in France as Les port des illusions and on American TV as The Devil's Choice.

== Plot ==
Carlos escapes from prison and meets Robert, who is carrying money that he has stolen from the bank where he was working. Carlos uses his girlfriend Evelyn, a singer, to steal the money so they can sail to Australia. However, Evelyn falls for Robert.

== Cast ==
- Belinda Lee as Evelyn
- Joachim Hansen as Robert
- Ivan Desny as Carlos
- Heinz Engelmann as Kapitän Philipp
- Peter Capell as Geck
- Osman Ragheb as Li Fang
- Dorothee Parker as Laura

== Production ==
Lee had previously appeared in the German film She Walks By Night produced by Jugert.

Filming started in Munich on 14 December 1959 under the title Katja.

It was known during filming as Liebe um Mitternacht.

== Bibliography ==
- Bergfelder, Tim. International Adventures: German Popular Cinema and European Co-Productions in the 1960s. Berghahn Books, 2005.
