= Final Destination: Red Lantern =

1960 film

- Directed by: Rudolf Jugert
- Written by: Norbert Jacques (novel); Franz Marischka; Norman Roland
- Produced by: Wolf C. Hartwig
- Starring: Joachim Fuchsberger; Christine Görner; Klausjürgen Wussow
- Cinematography: Georg Krause
- Edited by: Herbert Taschner
- Music by: Willy Mattes
- Production company: Rapid Film
- Distributed by: Prisma Film
- Release date: 5 February 1960
- Running time: 89 minutes
- Country: West Germany
- Language: German

Final Destination: Red Lantern (German: Endstation Rote Laterne) is a 1960 West German crime film directed by Rudolf Jugert and starring Joachim Fuchsberger, Christine Görner and Klausjürgen Wussow.

It is the third film version of Norbert Jacques' novel Plüsch und Plümowski, after The Bordello in Rio (1927) and Blondes for Export (1950).

== Cast ==
- Joachim Fuchsberger as Martin Stelling
- Christine Görner as Verena Linkmann
- Klausjürgen Wussow as Jan Fabrizius
- Elfie von Kalckreuth as Irene van Laan
- Werner Peters as Van laan
- Nana Osten as Uschi Berger
- Wolfgang Büttner
- Gudrun Schmidt as Nana Noel
- Otto Storr
- Annemarie Holtz
- Ernst Konstantin
- Elinor von Wallerstein
- Paul Bös
- Dorothee Parker
- Ernst G. Schiffner
- Micaela Wackermann
- Herbert Weicker
- Anja Brüning as Inga
- Eva Schauland

== Bibliography ==
- Bergfelder, Tim. International Adventures: German Popular Cinema and European Co-Productions in the 1960s. Berghahn Books, 2005.
