= Red Dragon (1965 film) =

1965 film

- Directed by: Ernst Hofbauer
- Written by: Hannes-Karl Kubiak
- Based on: River of the Three Junks (novel) by Georges Godefroy
- Produced by: Gero Wecker; Wolf C. Hartwig
- Starring: Stewart Granger; Rosanna Schiaffino; Margit Saad
- Cinematography: Werner M. Lenz
- Edited by: Eugenio Alabiso; Werner M. Lenz
- Music by: Riz Ortolani
- Production companies: Arca-Filmproduktion; Produzioni Europee Associati; Rapid Film
- Distributed by: Constantin Film
- Release date: 16 July 1965 (West Germany)
- Running time: 88 minutes
- Countries: West Germany; Italy
- Language: German
- Box office: 114,597 admissions (France); 933,983 admissions (Spain)

Red Dragon (German: Das Geheimnis der drei Dschunken, lit. 'The Secret of the Three Junks', Italian: A-009 missione Hong Kong) is a 1965 West German-Italian spy film directed by Ernst Hofbauer and starring Stewart Granger, Rosanna Schiaffino, and Margit Saad. It was released in Germany as Das Geheimnis der drei Dschunken and A 009 missione Hong Kong in Italy. It was released in the United States as a double feature with Lightning Bolt by Woolner Brothers in 1967 under the title Code Name Alpha.

The film's sets were designed by the art director Max Mellin. It was shot on location in Hong Kong.

The film is based on the 1952 novel Les Gentlemen de Hong Kong by Georges Godefroy that was made into the French spy film The River of Three Junks (1957) set in Saigon.

== Plot ==
In a Hong Kong park, a man brushes against the arm of a girl sitting on a bench, and she slips to the ground, murdered. Immediately afterward, the man is killed also. It turns out the woman was connected with a jewel-smuggling ring, and the man was a federal agent. FBI agent Michael Scott is given the assignment and finds a way to sneak agent Carol into the smuggling gang. Carol goes to work for Pierre Milot, who works for the smugglers.

== Cast ==
- Stewart Granger as Michael Scott
- Rosanna Schiaffino as Carol
- Paul Klinger as Norman
- Margit Saad as Blanche Coty
- Sieghardt Rupp as Pierre Milot
- Helga Sommerfeld as Danny Davis
- Franco Fantasia as Robert Grant
- Harald Juhnke as Smoky
- Chitra Ratana as Mai Tim
- Paul Dahlke as Harris
- Suzanne Roquette as Linda Wells
- Horst Frank as Pereira

== Bibliography ==
- Goble, Alan (1999). The Complete Index to Literary Sources in Film. Berlin: Walter de Gruyter. ISBN 978-3-11-095194-3.
