= Horrors of Spider Island =

- Theatrical release poster
- Directed by: Fritz Böttger
- Screenplay by: Fritz Böttger
- Produced by: Gaston Hakim; Wolf C. Hartwig
- Starring: Alexander D'Arcy; Barbara Valentin; Rainer Brandt; Harald Maresch
- Cinematography: Georg Krause
- Edited by: Heidi Genée
- Music by: Willi Mattes; Karl Bette
- Production companies: Rapid Film; Intercontinental Filmgesellschaft
- Distributed by: Neue Filmverleih; Pacemaker Pictures (U.S.)
- Release date: April 16, 1960 (Berlin)
- Running time: 82 minutes
- Country: West Germany
- Language: German

Horrors of Spider Island (German: Ein Toter hing im Netz, "A Corpse Hung in the Web") is a 1960 West German horror film written and directed by Fritz Böttger, and produced by Gaston Hakim and Wolf C. Hartwig for Rapid-Film/Intercontinental Filmgesellschaft. The film stars Alexander D'Arcy, Barbara Valentin and Rainer Brandt.

The film was released in Germany on April 16, 1960. It was released in the United States in March 1962, and was later released in different markets with various alternate titles including It's Hot in Paradise, Girls of Spider Island, Horror on the Spider Island and Spider's Web. It later played in the U. S. on a double feature with the 1960 British film The Flesh and the Fiends (which had been retitled Fiendish Ghouls in the United States).

== Plot ==
Gary Webster, a nightclub manager, accompanied by his assistant Georgia, flies a group of women from New York City to dance in his club in Singapore. While flying over the Pacific Ocean, their plane catches fire, splits in half, and plummets into the ocean. The group is next seen a few days later, suffering from dehydration on a life raft, before they finally spot a small island and stagger to dry land.

Having discovered fresh water, they explore the island and come across a cabin. Inside, they discover a dead man caught in a large spider web. According to his journal, the man was a Professor Green researching and mining for uranium, but he feared something terrible was about to happen to him. There's no indication how long the professor planned to be on the island, but the women estimate there is enough food to last them about a month.

That night on the cabin's front porch, Georgia sees Linda kiss Gary. Jealous, she pulls Linda away and slaps her. Gary leaves the two women on the porch and ventures out alone where he is bitten by a giant spider and turns into a spider-man beast. He flees into the woods, leaving the women to wonder what has happened to him. The next morning the women search for Gary, leaving only Linda behind in the cabin. Driven by uncontrollable violent urges, Gary kills Linda while she is sitting next to a stream. The remaining women return from their fruitless search for Gary, only to find Linda's dead body.

Twenty-eight days pass, and tensions between the women increase, culminating in a catfight between blondes Babs and Nelly. Gladys tries to stop the fight but the brunette is overpowered and forcibly restrained by blonde Kate. Georgia admonishes Babs and Nelly and implores them to stop, but the fight only ends when Gary appears and tries to kill Georgia. The women scream and Gary flees back into the jungle.

Running low on food, the women spot a ship on the horizon. Their hopes appear dashed as they are unable to signal it before it leaves, but two men, Joe and Bobby, disembark from the vessel and arrive in a rowboat with supplies for the professor. Joe and Bobby tell the girls the ship will be returning to pick the men back up, and that they will all be saved as a result. As they wait for the ship's scheduled return, they celebrate their last night on the island with a wild party. Both Gladys and Babs develop an affection for Bobby, leading to a confrontation between the barefoot, bikini clad brunette and the barefoot, scantily clad blonde. But instead of fighting, Babs tells Gladys that Bobby is only interested in her. Hearing the news, Gladys then heads off to rendezvous with Bobby in the jungle, only to find his dead body, another victim of Gary. Her screams attract the attention of both the other girls as well as Gary who chases her to a clifftop where she falls to her death.

Back at the cabin, Gary attacks Joe and is on the verge of killing him when Georgia strikes Gary with a flaming torch. Gary flees and Joe convinces the girls to grab torches and chase him to a quicksand pond where he drowns. The next morning, the ship arrives and they are rescued.

== Cast ==
- Alexander D'Arcy as Gary Webster
- Rainer Brandt as Bobby
- Walter Faber as Mike Blackwood
- Helga Franck as Georgia
- Harald Maresch as Joe
- Helga Neuner as Ann
- Dorothee Parker as Gladys
- Gerry Sammer as May
- Eva Schauland as Nelly
- Helma Vandenberg as Kate
- Barbara Valentin as Babs
- Elfie Wagner as Linda

== Production ==
The film was shot between October and November 1959 on location in Yugoslavia. Georg Krause, who previously shot Stanley Kubrick's 1957 anti-war classic Paths of Glory, served as the cinematographer, with Heidi Genée editing.

== Release ==
The film was shown in Berlin on April 16, 1960. Pacemaker Pictures distributed the film in the United States in March 1962, originally under the title It's Hot in Paradise with an 86-minute running time. It was later released in the U. S. retitled Horrors of Spider Island in November 1965 with a 75-minute running time, as part of a double feature with The Flesh and the Fiends (1960).

== Reception and legacy ==
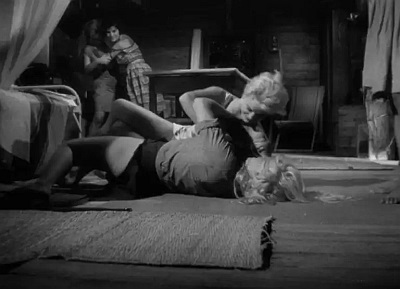
Catfight between actresses Barbara Valentin as Babs and Eva Schauland as Nelly

Author and film critic Leonard Maltin awarded the film 1.5 out of 4 stars, calling it a "well-photographed sex film, typical of the period", with sci-fi elements almost casually tossed in. AllMovie also gave the film 1.5 out of 5 stars, stating that "while the primary purpose of this German-made oddity is to show scantily clad women imperiled by a decidedly male beast, it's also attractively photographed, and several scenes (most notably, Gary's first post-bite attack, and his final flight through a swamp) deliver a frisson not usually found in nudie-cutie/monster movie hybrid". Brett Gallman from Oh, the Horror! panned the film, writing "No matter which mode it's in, the film is mostly incompetent. Shots are staged with little imagination, the (presumably) stock music is often incongruous with what's on the screen, and the acting turns are woeful". Gallman also criticized the film's poor dubbing, monster design and frequent day for night sequences.

Mondo Digital gave the film a mixed review, complimenting its atmosphere while acknowledging the film's faults, stating "While watchable even in its shortest version, Horrors of Spider Island becomes a delirious experience with the added nude swimming footage. The atrocious dubbing contains some of the more quotable one-liners around, while D'Arcy's weird but decidedly non-threatening monster makes up for the decided lack of actual arachnids on screen".

Multiple reviewers have cited the soft-core porn aspect of the semi-clad women catfighting each other, "Barbara Valentin, the very definition of ‘blonde bombshell’ ... the film ensures that her top is pulled open to expose a spectacular bosom, during one particularly vigorous cat fight."

George R. Reis from DVD Drive-In, however, gave the film a positive review, commending the film's climax as "moody" and "well-photographed".

It was featured on the television series Mystery Science Theater 3000 in 1999.

== See also ==
- List of films in the public domain in the United States
- List of German films of the 1960s
- List of horror films of 1960
