= Horst Frank =

German actor (1929–1999)

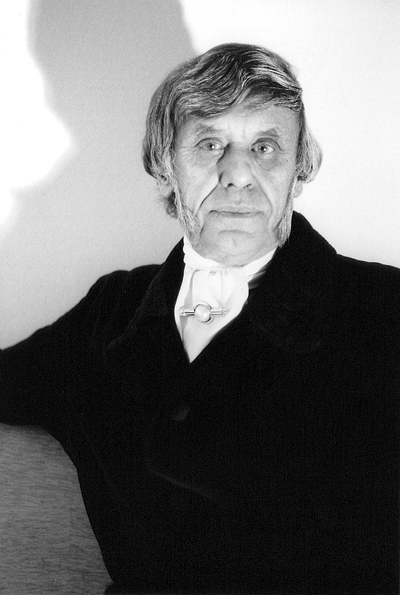
- Born: 28 May 1929; Lübeck, Germany
- Died: 25 May 1999 (aged 69); Heidelberg, Germany
- Occupation: Actor
- Years active: 1955–1999

Horst Frank (28 May 1929 – 25 May 1999) was a German film actor. He appeared in more than 100 films between 1955 and 1999. He was born in Lübeck and died in Heidelberg.

== Selected filmography ==
- Der Stern von Afrika (1957) – Albin Droste
- Haie und kleine Fische (1957) – Heyne
- The Copper (1958) – Josef Schmitz
- Rosemary (1958) – Student Michael Runge
- Blitzmädels an die Front (1958) – Gaston, ein Franzose
- The Girl from the Marsh Croft (1958) – Jan Lindgren
- Schwarze Nylons – Heiße Nächte (1958) – Sabri
- My Ninety Nine Brides (1958) – Jonny der Husar
- Stalingrad: Dogs, Do You Want to Live Forever? (1959) – Feldwebel Böse
- Wolves of the Deep (1959) – Lo Sposino
- The Head (1959) – Dr. Brandt – alias Dr. Ood
- Rebel Flight to Cuba (1959) – Richard Marshall
- The Cat Shows Her Claws (1960) – Le Major Von Hollwitz
- Boomerang (1960) – Willy Schneider
- Kein Engel ist so rein (1960) – Bubi Lausch
- Darkness Fell on Gotenhafen (1960) – Narrator (uncredited)
- Die zornigen jungen Männer (1960) – Dr. Gerd Schneider
- Between Love and Duty (1960) – Le colonel von Stauffen
- Officer Factory (1960) – Hauptmann Feder
- Tu ne tueras point (1961) – Adler
- Treibjagd auf ein Leben (1961) – Emil Frenzel
- Darling (1961) – Alberto – Albert
- Our House in Cameroon (1961) – Klaas Steensand
- Melody of Hate (1962) – Rasan
- The Hot Port of Hong Kong (1962) – Frank Marek
- Between Shanghai and St. Pauli (1962) – Frederic
- The Black Panther of Ratana (1963) – Jack Roller
- The White Spider (1963) – Kiddie Phelips
- Les Tontons flingueurs (1963) – Théo
- The Pirates of the Mississippi (1963) – Kelly
- Mission to Hell (1964) – Jack McLean
- Mystery of the Red Jungle (1964) – Robert Perkins
- Dead Woman from Beverly Hills (1964) – Manning / Dr. Steininger
- The Secret of the Chinese Carnation (1964) – Leutnant Legget
- Bullets Don't Argue (1964) – Billy Clayton
- Massacre at Marble City (1964) – Dan McCormick
- Black Eagle of Santa Fe (1965) – Blade Carpenter
- 13 Days to Die (1965) – Perkins
- Red Dragon (1965) – Pereira
- Code Name: Jaguar (1965) – Karl
- Die letzten Drei der Albatros (1965) – Sven Broderson
- Blue Light (1966, Episode: "The Weapon Within" (1966) – Luber
- The Trap Snaps Shut at Midnight (1966) – Larry Link
- Diamond Safari (1966) – Fédérico
- Countdown to Doomsday (1966) – Dr. Soarez
- I Deal in Danger (1966) – Luber
- The Vengeance of Fu Manchu (1967) – Rudy Moss
- Dead Run (1967) – Manganne
- Desert Commandos (1967) – Lt. Roland Wolf
- A Handful of Heroes (1967) – Hauptmann Bruck
- Django, Prepare a Coffin (1968) – David Barry
- Johnny Hamlet (1968) – Claude Hamilton
- Hate Thy Neighbor (1968) – Chris Malone
- The Moment to Kill (1968) – Jason Forrester
- Le Paria (1969) – Rolf
- Marquis de Sade: Justine (1969) – Marquis de Bressac
- La porta del cannone (1969) – Müller, Gestapo
- Catherine, il suffit d'un amour (1969) – Duke Philippe
- Angels of the Street (1969) – Jule Nickels
- So Sweet... So Perverse (1969) – Klaus
- Frisch, fromm, fröhlich, frei (1970) – Waldemar Klingel
- Das Glöcklein unterm Himmelbett (1970) – Pater Guderim
- The Cat o' Nine Tails (1971) – Dr. Braun
- Und Jimmy ging zum Regenbogen (1971) – Karl Flemming
- Der scharfe Heinrich (1971) – Heinrich Müller
- Jailbreak in Hamburg (1971) – Willy Jensen
- Carlos (1971) – Ligo
- The Dead Are Alive (1972) – Stephen
- Eye in the Labyrinth (1972) – Luca
- The Grand Duel (1972) – David Saxon / Patriarch Samuel Saxon
- Carambola! (1974) – Clydeson
- Cold Blood (1975) – Himmel – the Boss
- The Mimosa Wants to Blossom Too (1976) – Oberst Oschenko
- Albino (1976) – Whispering Death
- The Elixirs of the Devil (1976) – Dominikaner
- Rosemary's Daughter (1976) – Heinrich "Mario" Schmitz
- Derrick (1976, Episode: "Auf eigene Faust") – Achim Schenke
- Der Winter, der ein Sommer war (1976, TV Mini-Series) – Freder Soermann / Soerman
- Das Gesetz des Clans (1977) – Pepe Coronado
- Operation Ganymed (1977, TV Movie) – Mac
- Ways in the Night (1979) – Hans Albert
- Timm Thaler (1979, TV Mini-Series) – Baron de Lefouet
- The Dream House (1980) – Conrad Kolberg
- Derrick (1980, Episode: "Dem Mörder eine Kerze") – Pfarrer Scholz
- Flächenbrand (1981, TV Movie) – Lothar Steingruber
- Derrick (1983, Episode: "Die Tote in der Isar") – Robert Kabeck
- Mandara (1983, TV Mini-Series)
- Der Mann von Suez (1983, TV Mini-Series)
- Catherine the Great (1995, TV Movie) – Schwerin
- Die Menschen sind kalt (1998) – Museumsdirektor
