= Dietmar Schönherr =

Austrian actor (1926–2014)

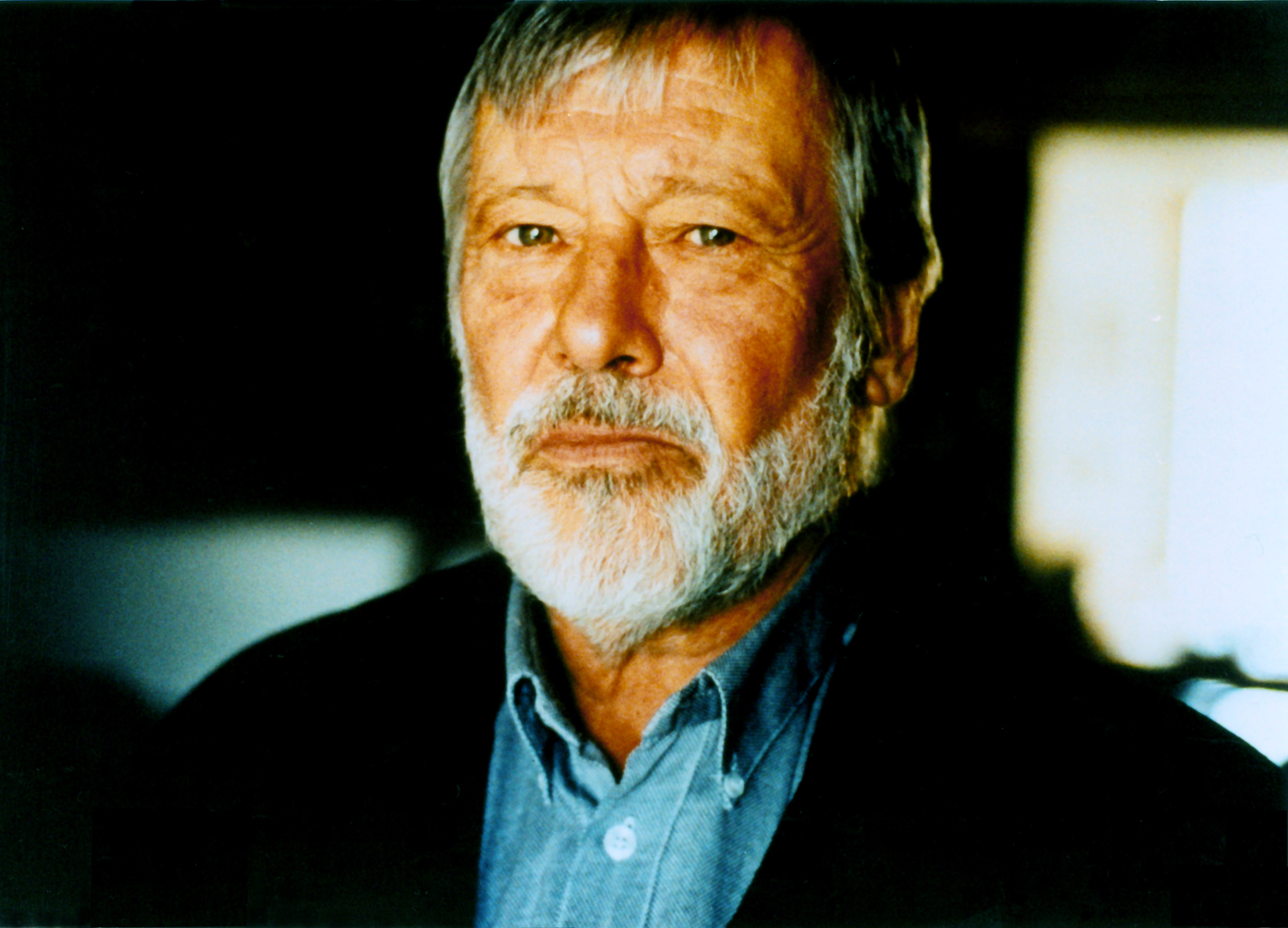
- Photographed by his wife Vivi Bach
- Born: 17 May 1926; Innsbruck, Tyrol, Austria
- Died: 18 July 2014 (aged 88); Ibiza, Spain
- Occupation: Actor
- Years active: 1944–2014
- Spouse: Vivi Bach (m. 1965; died 2013)

Dietmar Otto Schönherr (German: [ˈdiːtmaʁ ˈʃøːnhɛʁ]; 17 May 1926 – 18 July 2014) was an Austrian film actor. He appeared in 120 films between 1944 and 2014. He was famous for playing the role of Major Cliff Allister McLane in the German science fiction series Raumpatrouille. He was born in Innsbruck, Austria. He was married to the Danish actress Vivi Bach from 1965 until her death in 2013. In 2011 he was awarded with the Austrian Cross of Honour for Science and Art, 1st class.

== Selected filmography ==
- Junge Adler (Young Eagles) (1944) - Theo Brakke
- Les Amours de Blanche-Neige (1947) - Joe Burton
- Das Fräulein und der Vagabund (1949) - Gerhard Renken
- Night on Mont Blanc (1951) - Vigo, Leutnant der Grenzpolizei
- Love's Carnival (1955) - Leutnant Hans Rudloff
- Bonjour Kathrin (1956) - Duval
- Friederike von Barring (1956) - Müller-Staen jr.
- Kleines Zelt und große Liebe (1956) - Ferry Singer
- Das Mädchen Marion (1956) - Günter Legler, Turnierreiter
- Made in Germany (1957) - Dr. Roderich Zeiss
- Die verpfuschte Hochzeitsnacht (1957) - Alexander Schulze
- Just Once a Great Lady (1957) - Stefan Riehl
- Spring in Berlin (1957) - Hannes Delk
- Doctor Bertram (1957) - Kurt Losch
- The Elephant in a China Shop (1958) - Clemens
- Black Forest Cherry Schnapps (1958) - Peter Benrath
- Der schwarze Blitz (1958) - Herbert Thanner
- Sehnsucht hat mich verführt (1958) - Albert Hermann
- Frauensee (1958) - Ferry Graf Chur
- Die unvollkommene Ehe (1959) - Rolf Beckmayer
- Every Day Isn't Sunday (1959) - Mitja Burganoff
- Jons und Erdme (1959) - Direktor der Seifenfabrik
- Du bist wunderbar (1959) - Willi Schultz
- Beloved Augustin (1960) - Franz von Gravenreuth
- Darkness Fell on Gotenhafen (1960) - Gaston
- Im Namen einer Mutter (1960) - Fritz Merlin
- Brainwashed (1960) - Rabbi
- Ingeborg (1960) - Peter
- Sabine und die 100 Männer (1960) - Michael Böhm
- Beloved Impostor (1961) - David Ogden
- Treibjagd auf ein Leben (1961) - Dr. Georg Holst
- Melody of Hate (1962) - Dr. Elmer
- The Longest Day (1962) - Häger's Aide (uncredited)
- Commando (1962) - Petit Prince
- The Happy Years of the Thorwalds (1962) - Martin Thorwald
- His Best Friend (1962) - Marius Melichar
- Kohlhiesel's Daughters (1962) - Günter Krüger
- The Nylon Noose (1963) - Inspektor Eric Harvey
- Das Rätsel der roten Quaste (1963) - Richard
- Mystery of the Red Jungle (1964) - Ted Barnekow
- Ein Frauenarzt klagt an (1964) - Klaus Petermann
- The Monster of London City (1964) - Dr. Morely Greely / Michael
- Victim Five (1964) - Dr. Paul Bryson
- The Secret of the Chinese Carnation (1964) - Dr. Cecil Wilkens
- Ein Ferienbett mit 100 PS (1965) - Hans Rothe
- Coast of Skeletons (1965) - Piet Van Houten
- Mozambique (1965) - Henderson
- A Holiday with Piroschka (1965) - Alfi Trattenbach
- Come to the Blue Adriatic (1966) - Walter Thomas
- Raumpatrouille (1966, TV series, 7 episodes) - Cliff Allister McLane
- Ski Fever (1966) - Toni
- Kommissar X – Drei grüne Hunde (1967) - Allan Hood / George Hood
- Otto ist auf Frauen scharf (1968) - Christian Bongert
- April - April (1969) - Ambassador
- Come to Vienna, I'll Show You Something! (1970) - Narrator
- The Man Who Sold the Eiffel Tower (1970, TV film) - Bredford King
- Der Spinnenmörder (1978, TV film) - Police Lieutenant Anderson
- Die Story (1984) - Talk show host
- The Death of the White Stallion (1985) - Caspar von Schenkenstein
- A Crime of Honour (a.k.a. A Song for Europe, 1985, TV film) - Junger
- Raffl (1985) - Pfarrer
- Tanner (1985) - Steiner
- Torquemada (1989)
- Reporter (1989, TV series) - Chief Editor Herbst
- African Timber (1989) - Brasser
- Journey of Hope (1990) - Massimo
- Mirakel (1990)
- Go Trabi Go 2 – Das war der wilde Osten (1992) - Gustav Hohenstein
- By Way of the Stars (1992, TV miniseries) - Friedrich Brunneck
- Night on Fire (1992) - Joshua Jordi
- Family Passions (1993–1994, TV series) - Jürgen Haller
- Rosen aus Jericho (1994)
- Jeden 3. Sonntag (1995)
- Es war doch Liebe? (1995)
- An Almost Perfect Divorce (1997) - Dr. Hofbauer
- Back in Trouble (1997) - Dinkelmann
- Am I Beautiful? (1998) - Juan
- The Cry of the Butterfly (1999) - Paulina's Grandfather
- Leo & Claire (2001) - Anwalt Dr. Richard Iphraim Herz
- Der blaue Vogel (2001, TV film) - Jon Kamphoven
- Handyman (2006) - Dr. Meyer
