= The Pirates of the Mississippi =

1848 novel by Friedrich Gerstäcker

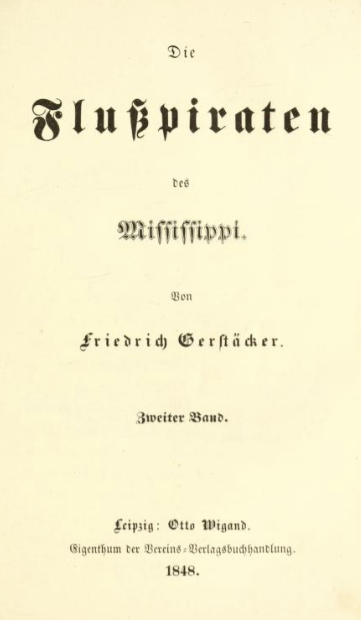
- Title page for Die Flußpiraten des Mississippi (1848 original German language edition)
- Author: Friedrich Gerstäcker
- Original title: Die Flußpiraten des Mississippi
- Language: German
- Publisher: Otto Wigand
- Publication date: 1848
- Publication place: Saxony
- English publication date: 1856
- Pages: 271 (volume 1); 322 (volume 2); 308 (volume 3)

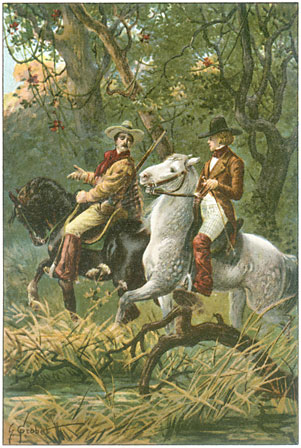
Illustration by H. Grobet

The Pirates of the Mississippi (German: Die Flußpiraten des Mississippi. Aus dem Waldleben Amerikas) is a novel by the German writer Friedrich Gerstäcker, published in three volumes by Otto Wigand in Leipzig in 1848. It revolves around a gang of river pirates led by the charismatic Captain Kelly, who operate from an island in the Mississippi River, have infiltrated the nearby town of Helena, Arkansas, and rob flatboats passing by. It was published in English by Routledge in 1856.

The book was the basis for the 1963 film The Pirates of the Mississippi directed by Jürgen Roland.
