= The Young Tigers of Hong Kong =

- Directed by: Ernst Hofbauer
- Written by: Rolf Olsen; August Rieger
- Produced by: Wolf C. Hartwig
- Starring: Robert Woods; Véronique Vendell; Werner Pochath
- Cinematography: Hans Jura
- Edited by: Herbert Taschner
- Music by: Gert Wilden
- Production companies: Lisa Film; Rapid Film
- Distributed by: Nora-Filmverleih
- Release date: 25 July 1969
- Running time: 95 minutes
- Country: West Germany
- Language: German

The Young Tigers of Hong Kong (German: Die jungen Tiger von Hongkong) is a 1969 West German action film directed by Ernst Hofbauer and starring Robert Woods, Véronique Vendell and Werner Pochath.

The film's sets were designed by the art director Peter Rothe. Location shooting took place around Hong Kong.

== Cast ==
- Robert Woods as Rodney
- Véronique Vendell as Ann
- Werner Pochath as Walter
- Barbara Capell as Christine
- Jochen Busse as Carl van Dreegen
- Solvi Stubing
- Michael Bulmer
- Las Franzin
- Huk van Es
- Ralf Wolter as Bob

== Bibliography ==
- Bergfelder, Tim. International Adventures: German Popular Cinema and European Co-Productions in the 1960s. Berghahn Books, 2005.
