= Wolfgang Büttner =

German actor (1912–1990)

- Born: 1 June 1912; Rostock, German Empire
- Died: 18 November 1990 (aged 78); Stockdorf, Germany
- Occupation: Actor
- Years active: 1950–1998

Wolfgang Büttner (1 June 1912 – 18 November 1990) was a German actor. He appeared in more than one hundred films from 1950 to 1998.

== Filmography ==
Year	Title	Role	Notes
1950	Crown Jewels	Scaliger	
1951	Das ewige Spiel		
1952	The Sergeant's Daughter	Vizewachtmeister Queiss	
1955	The Dark Star	Bellani	
1955	The Plot to Assassinate Hitler	Gen. Friedrich Olbricht	
1956	Devil in Silk	Dr. Hess	
1956	Ein Herz schlägt für Erika	Karl Hartwig	
1958	All the Sins of the Earth	Father Hildebrand	
1958	Taiga	Sennewald	
1958	Worüber man nicht spricht - Frauenarzt Dr. Brand greift ein	Polizist	Uncredited
1959	Stalingrad: Dogs, Do You Want to Live Forever?		
1959	Love Now, Pay Later	Andreas Guttberg, Polizeipsychologe	
1960	Final Destination: Red Lantern		
1960	Headquarters State Secret	Admiral	
1961	Black Gravel	Otto Krahne	
1962	Life of Galileo	Cardinal Inquisitor	TV movie
1962	The Puzzle of the Red Orchid	Chief Inspector Tetley	
1962	The Longest Day	Maj. Gen. Dr. Hans Speidel	
1963	Danton's Death	Robbespierre	TV movie
1964	Der Prozeß Carl von O.	Reichsgerichtsrat	TV movie
1964	Murderer in the Fog	Schuldirektor Dr. Hillebrand	
1967	The Smooth Career	Richard Benedikt	
1969	Michael Kohlhaas		TV movie
1971	The German Lesson	Max Nansen	TV movie
1971	The End Of A Mission	Judge Stollfuß	TV movie
1972	Nicht Lob – noch Furcht. Graf Galen, Bischof von Münster	Graf Galen	TV movie
1974	Karl May	Ehrecke von Moabit	
1985	Der Krieg meines Vaters	Narrator	Voice
