= Die Letzten drei der Albatross =

- Directed by: Wolfgang Becker
- Written by: Werner P. Zibaso
- Produced by: Wolf C. Hartwig
- Cinematography: Rolf Kästel
- Edited by: Herbert Taschner
- Music by: Francesco De Masi
- Release date: 1965
- Running time: 105 minutes
- Countries: Germany; Italy; France
- Language: German

Die Letzten Drei der Albatross also known as Mutiny in the South Seas is a 1965 German-Italian-French international co-production film directed by Wolfgang Becker.

== Cast ==
- Joachim Hansen
- Harald Juhnke
- Horst Niendorf
- Gisella Arden
- Jacques Bézard
- Horst Frank
- Philippe Guégan
- Eva Montes
- Alfredo Varelli
