= Rapid Film =

German film company

Rapid Film was a German film production company established by producer Wolf C. Hartwig. Based in Munich, it operated from the late 1950s to the mid-1980s producing low-budget but commercially successful genre films.

During the 1960s Rapid established a distribution arrangement with the leading German studio Constantin Film, and provided the company with many of its hit releases.

During the 1970s Hartwig concentrated on producing sex comedies such as the Schoolgirl Report series.

It should not be confused with a company of the same name owned by French producer Bernard Natan during the silent era.

== Selected filmography ==
- All the Sins of the Earth (1958)
- Sin Began with Eve (1958)
- Horrors of Spider Island (1960)
- Final Destination: Red Lantern (1960)
- Satan Tempts with Love (1960)
- Island of the Amazons (1960)
- Between Shanghai and St. Pauli (1962)
- The Hot Port of Hong Kong (1962)
- Melody of Hate (1962)
- The Black Panther of Ratana (1963)
- Homesick for St. Pauli (1963)
- Storm Over Ceylon (1963)
- The Secret of the Chinese Carnation (1964)
- Massacre at Marble City (1964)
- Coffin from Hong Kong (1964)
- Red Dragon (1965)
- Black Eagle of Santa Fe (1965)
- Agent 505: Death Trap in Beirut (1966)
- A Handful of Heroes (1967)
- Lotus Flowers for Miss Quon (1967)
- Emma Hamilton (1968)
- Madame and Her Niece (1969)
- The Young Tigers of Hong Kong (1969)
- So Sweet... So Perverse (1969)
- Moonlighting Mistress (1970)
- Holiday Report (1971)
- Office Girls (1971)
- Nurse Report (1972)
- The Disciplined Woman (1972)
- The Girl from Hong Kong (1973)
- No Gold for a Dead Diver (1974)
- Cross of Iron (1977)
- Breakthrough (1979)

== Bibliography ==
- Bergfelder, Tim. International Adventures: German Popular Cinema and European Co-Productions in the 1960s. Berghahn Books, 2005.
