= Nurse Report =

- Film poster
- German: Krankenschwestern-Report
- Directed by: Walter Boos
- Written by: Werner P. Zibaso
- Produced by: Wolf C. Hartwig
- Starring: Doris Arden; Ingrid Steeger; Karin Heske
- Cinematography: Klaus Werner
- Edited by: Karl Aulitzky
- Music by: Chapell Verlag
- Production company: Rapid Film
- Distributed by: Constantin Film
- Release date: 27 October 1972
- Running time: 81 minutes
- Country: West Germany
- Language: German

Nurse Report (German: Krankenschwestern-Report) is a 1972 West German comedy film directed by Walter Boos and starring Doris Arden, Ingrid Steeger and Karin Heske. It was a sex report film produced by Wolf C. Hartwig's Rapid Film, in an attempt to capitalise on the success of the company's hit Schoolgirl Report series.

== Cast ==
- Doris Arden as nurse Beate
- Ingrid Steeger as nurse Melanie
- Karin Heske as nurse Gertrud
- Rosl Mayr as nurse Oberin
- Emily Reuer as Frau Hellwich
- Elisabeth Volkmann as Isabella Ziegler
- Barbara Stanek as Brigitte Mittler
- Claus Tinney as Oberarzt Dr. Hellwich
- Frank Nossack as Dr. Hans Moser
- Ibrahim Aslahan as Dr. Abdul Ramin
- Dieter Assmann as Michael
- Ulrike Butz as nurse Karin
- Claudia Fielers as nurse with Hängolin syringe
- Felix Franchy as Dr. Eder
- Leopold Gmeinwieser as patient - ridden at the beginning of the film by a nurse
- Dieter Groest as Dr. Bauer
- Dorit Henke as nurse Hannelore
- Carmen Jäckel as nurse Topsy from Curaçao
- Gernot Möhner as Reporter Bernd Mittler
- Karel Otto as head doctor
- Hasso Preiß as Patient - disturbed in sleep by Sister Doris
- Dorothea Rau a nurse Doris
- Willy Schultes as Eichinger - doorman
- Melitta Tegeler as nurse Monika - beloved of Dr. Hellwich
- Birgit Tetzlaff as nurse Marianne
- Dagmar Walter as Dr. Mettmann
- Dagobert Walter as Dr. Mettmann
- Konstantin Wecker as Axel - Karin's friend
- Elisabeth Welz as head nurse
- Iris Wobker as nurse - who rides the patient into ER at the beginning of the film
- Nico Wolferstetter as Dr. Nader
