= Emma Hamilton (film) =

- French release poster
- Directed by: Christian-Jaque
- Written by: Jameson Brewer; Valeria Bonamano; Werner P. Zibaso; Christian-Jaque
- Based on: La Sanfelice by Alexandre Dumas
- Produced by: Alberto Grimaldi; Wolf C. Hartwig; Peer J. Oppenheimer
- Starring: Michèle Mercier; Richard Johnson; John Mills
- Cinematography: Pierre Petit
- Edited by: Eugenio Alabiso; Herbert Taschner
- Music by: Riz Ortolani
- Production companies: Produzioni Europee Associate; Rapid Film; Gaumont
- Distributed by: Société Nouvelle de Cinématographie (France); Constantin Film (Germany); Rank Film Distributors (UK)
- Release date: 28 November 1968
- Running time: 98 minutes
- Countries: France; Italy; West Germany
- Language: English

Emma Hamilton is a 1968 historical drama film directed by Christian-Jaque and starring Michèle Mercier, Richard Johnson and John Mills. It was partly based on the 1864 novel La Sanfelice by Alexandre Dumas and depicts the love affair between Emma Hamilton and Horatio Nelson. It was a co-production between Italy, West Germany and France.

== Cast ==
- Michèle Mercier as Emma Lyon-Hamilton
- Richard Johnson as Horatio Nelson
- John Mills as Sir William Hamilton
- Harald Leipnitz as Harry Featherstone
- Claudio Undari as Captain Hardy
- Mirko Ellis as John Payne
- Lorenzo Terzon as Lord Charles Greville
- Howard Ross as Dick Strong
- Gabriella Giorgelli as Laurie Strong
- Gisela Uhlen as Mrs Love
- Venantino Venantini as Prince Carraciola
- Mario Pisu as King Ferdinand of Naples
- Boy Gobert as Romney, George
- Gigi Ballista as Cardinal Ruffo
- Dieter Borsche as Dr. Graham
- Nadja Tiller as Queen Caroline of Naples

== See also ==
- List of American films of 1968
