= Maria Perschy =

Austrian actress (1938–2004)

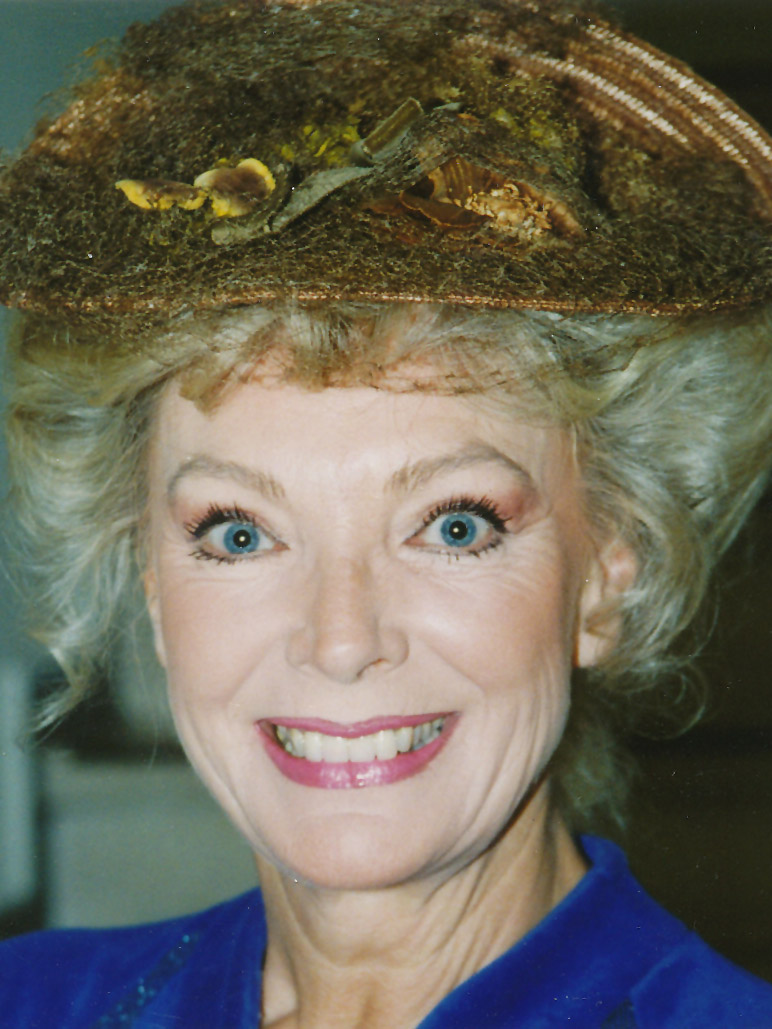
- Born: Herta-Maria Perschy; 23 September 1938; Eisenstadt, Reichsgau Niederdonau, Nazi Germany (now Burgenland, Austria)
- Died: 3 December 2004 (aged 66); Vienna, Austria
- Occupation: Actress
- Years active: 1956–2000

Herta-Maria Perschy (23 September 1938 – 3 December 2004) was an Austrian actress whose career included performances on screen with actor Rock Hudson and on American television in both daytime and prime time.

== Early life ==
Perschy was born in Eisenstadt in 1938, then part of Nazi Germany following that year's Anschluss, now in Burgenland, Austria, and moved to Vienna at the age of 17 to study acting.

== Career ==
After completing her education, she moved to West Germany for more training, leading to a film career. Her first major success came with Nasser Asphalt where she played together with Horst Buchholz. Her acting career would eventually take her — by way of France, Italy and the United Kingdom — to Hollywood. Perschy played in a number of American films, her most notable roles being in the 1962 biopic Freud, the 1964 Rock Hudson comedy, Man's Favorite Sport?, and the 1964 hit war movie 633 Squadron. In 1967, she appeared in the Eurospy film, Spy Today, Die Tomorrow. Perschy's career in America eventually declined and by the late 1970s her only US appearances were brief roles in TV shows such as Hawaii Five-O and General Hospital.

While shooting in Spain in 1971, Perschy suffered a burn injury from an accident that required several operations before she could resume her career. Perschy returned to her native Austria in 1985 and continued to perform in a series of plays and TV series.

In 1969, she filmed Castle of Fu Manchu with Christopher Lee and Richard Greene. When it aired on television in New York City four years later, The New York Times noted that the film would be "well worth viewing, if it's as sharp and fast as others in this new series". She appeared in several Euro-Horror cult films directed by Paul Naschy and Amando de Ossorio, including Exorcismo (1975), The People Who Own the Dark (1975), Hunchback of the Morgue (1973), Blue Eyes of the Broken Doll (1974), The Ghost Galleon (19074) and Murders in the Rue Morgue (1971).

== Death ==
On 3 December 2004, Perschy died of cancer in Vienna, at age 66.

== Selected filmography ==
- Nichts als Ärger mit der Liebe (1956)
- Roter Mohn (1956) - Extra (uncredited)
- Nasser Asphalt (1958) - Bettina
- Der schwarze Blitz (1958) - Gretl Mittermayr
- Die Landärztin (1958) - Afra
- Il moralista (1959) - Monique
- Of Course, the Motorists (1959) - Karin Dobermann
- Call Girls of Rome (1960) - Claudia
- The Hero of My Dreams (1960) - Franziska Kleinschmidt
- Love in Rome (1960) - Eleonora Curtatoni
- Ordered to Love (1961) - Doris Korff
- Wenn beide schuldig werden (1962) - Josi
- Melody of Hate (1962) - Claudia / Martina
- The Password Is Courage (1962) - Irena
- Freud (1962) - Magda (uncredited)
- The Hangman of London (1963) - Ann Barry
- 633 Squadron (1964) - Hilde Bergman
- Man's Favorite Sport? (1964) - Isolde 'Easy' Mueller
- Mystery of the Red Jungle (1964) - Claudia Laudon
- No Survivors, Please (1964) - Ginny Desmond
- Secret of the Sphinx (1964) - Hélène Blomberg
- Extraconiugale (1964) - Eva (segment "La moglie svedese")
- The Bandits of the Rio Grande (1965) - Helen
- African Gold (1965) - Helena Hanson
- Kiss Kiss, Kill Kill (1966) - Joan Smith
- Seven Vengeful Women (1966) - Ursula
- The Desperate Ones (1967) - Marusia
- Five Golden Dragons (1967) - Margret
- A Witch Without a Broom (1967) - Mariana
- Spy Today, Die Tomorrow (1967) - Lu Forrester
- The Castle of Fu Manchu (1969) - Marie / Ingrid
- Dr. Fabian: Laughing Is the Best Medicine (1969) - Dr. Inge Vollmer
- El último día de la guerra (1970) - Elena Truppe
- Murders in the Rue Morgue (1971) - Genevre
- The Leo Chronicles (1972)
- Hunchback of the Morgue (1973) - Frieda
- El espectro del terror (1973) - María
- The Ghost Galleon (1974) - Lillian
- Los fríos senderos del crimen (1974) - Jane
- Blue Eyes of the Broken Doll (1974) - Ivette
- Dites-le avec des fleurs (1974) - La femme de Klaus
- La noche de la furia (1974) - Jill
- Exorcismo (1975) - Patricia
- La Diosa salvaje (1975) - Isabel von Marnix
- The Adolescents (1975) - Miss Stella Larsen
- My Husband Prefers Virgins (1975) - Luisa
- Las protegidas (1975) - Sra. de Aguirre
- El límite del amor (1976) - Madre Superiora
- The People Who Own the Dark (1976) - Lily
- Batida de raposas (1976) - Mercedes
- The Standard (1977) - Mordax
- Hawaii Five-O (1978, Episode: "Sleeper") - Sonya
- Les Morfalous (1984) - Pamela Windsor
- Harry and Harriet (1990) - Ruth Olsen
