= Moonlighting Mistress =

1970 film

- Directed by: Wolfgang Becker
- Written by: Werner P. Zibaso; Willibald Eser
- Produced by: Wolf C. Hartwig; Ludwig Spitaler
- Starring: Harald Leipnitz; Ruth-Maria Kubitschek; Véronique Vendell
- Cinematography: Rolf Kästel
- Edited by: Jan Catell
- Music by: Martin Böttcher
- Production companies: Les Films Jacques Willemetz; Rapid Film
- Distributed by: Inter-Verleih Film
- Release date: 22 December 1970
- Running time: 84 minutes
- Countries: France; West Germany
- Language: German

Moonlighting Mistress or I Sleep with My Murderer (German: Ich schlafe mit meinem Mörder, French: Je couche avec mon assassin) is a 1970 French-West German thriller film directed by Wolfgang Becker and starring Harald Leipnitz, Ruth-Maria Kubitschek and Véronique Vendell. Resembling the fashionable giallo genre, it was produced by Rapid Film which specialised in making low-budget genre films with commercial appeal.

== Synopsis ==
A man intends to kill his wealthy wife so he can inherit her money and live with his attractive mistress. However, scheme to murder her does not go to plan.

== Cast ==
- Harald Leipnitz as Jan
- Ruth-Maria Kubitschek as Angela
- Véronique Vendell as Gina
- Friedrich Joloff as Inspector
- Peter Capell as Vanetti
- Wolf Harnisch as Burckhardt
- Henri Guégan as 1. Einbrecher
- Helge T. Larisch as 2. Einbrecher
- Ellen Umlauf as Erpresserin
- Jackie Lombard as 1. Callgirl
- Waltraud Schaeffler as 2. Callgirl
- Rosl Mayr as Putzfrau

== Bibliography ==
- Bock, Hans-Michael & Bergfelder, Tim. The Concise CineGraph. Encyclopedia of German Cinema. Berghahn Books, 2009..
- Grant, John. A Comprehensive Encyclopedia of Film Noir: The Essential Reference Guide. Rowman & Littlefield, 2023.
