= A Handful of Heroes =

1967 film

- Directed by: Fritz Umgelter
- Written by: Sergio Donati; Henry Koster; Werner P. Zibaso
- Produced by: Wolf C. Hartwig
- Starring: Horst Frank; Valeria Ciangottini; Karl-Heinz Fiege
- Cinematography: Rolf Kästel
- Edited by: Herbert Taschner
- Music by: Angelo Francesco Lavagnino
- Production companies: Rapid Film; Produzioni Europee Associati
- Distributed by: Constantin Film
- Release date: 17 November 1967
- Running time: 94 minutes
- Countries: West Germany; Italy
- Language: German

A Handful of Heroes (German: Eine Handvoll Helden) is a 1967 West German-Italian historical war film directed by Fritz Umgelter and starring Horst Frank, Valeria Ciangottini and Karl-Heinz Fiege.

It is a remake of the 1930 film The Last Company about a detachment of Prussian soldiers who defend a vital outpost against Napoleon's armies around the time of the Battle of Jena (1806).

It was shot on location in Hungary using Eastmancolor.

== Cast ==
- Horst Frank as Hauptmann Bruck
- Valeria Ciangottini as Angelika
- Karl-Heinz Fiege as Oberjäger Rückert
- Volkert Kraeft as Fahnenjunker Olberg
- Luigi Ciavarro as Steffen
- Martin Lüttge as Jäger Hinnerk
- Rolf Becker as Jäger Borgmann
- Jörg Pleva as Jäger Papke
- Franz Rudnick as Kanonier Kurtz
- Franco Fantasia as Steffen
- Ferenc Zenthe
- Géza Tordy
- György Bánffy
- János Csányi
- Géza Ferdinándy
- Erzsi Orsolya

== Bibliography ==
- Klossner, Michael. The Europe of 1500–1815 on Film and Television: A Worldwide Filmography of Over 2550 Works, 1895 Through 2000. McFarland & Company, 2002.
