= Island of the Amazons =

1960 film

- Directed by: Otto Meyer
- Written by: Johannes Kai
- Produced by: Wolf C. Hartwig
- Starring: Adrian Hoven; Ann Smyrner; Jan Hendriks
- Cinematography: Georg Krause
- Music by: Karl Bette
- Production company: Rapid Film
- Distributed by: Union-Film
- Release date: 25 November 1960
- Running time: 88 minutes
- Country: West Germany
- Language: German

Island of the Amazons (German: Die Insel der Amazonen) is a 1960 West German adventure film directed by Otto Meyer and starring Adrian Hoven, Ann Smyrner and Jan Hendriks.

In the United States it was released with the alternative title of Seven Daring Girls.

== Cast ==
- Adrian Hoven as Manuel
- Ann Smyrner as Liz
- Jan Hendriks as Murdok
- Dorothee Parker as Colette
- Beatrice Norden as Trixi
- Kurt E. Ludwig as Muhazzin
- Demeter Bitenc as Leblanc
- Janez Skof as
- Dora Carras as Sonja
- Karin Heske as Katrin
- Brigitte Riedle
- Nina Semona as Merci
- Slavo Schweiger as Felipe

== Bibliography ==
- Bergfelder, Tim. International Adventures: German Popular Cinema and European Co-Productions in the 1960s. Berghahn Books, 2005.
