= Dorothee Parker =

German actress

- Born: Dorothea Glöcklen; 11 March 1938 (age 88); Cologne, Germany
- Occupation: Actress
- Years active: 1959-1971 (film & TV)

Dorothee Parker (born 11 March 1938) is a German retired stage and film actress. She was married to the film producer Wolf C. Hartwig and appeared in a number of his films. After their separation, she established a modelling agency in Hamburg.

== Biography ==
Parker was born in Cologne, Germany. She began to play under the slightly changed name Dorothee Glöcklen and in 1959 began her first permanent engagements at the Westphalian State Theater in Castrop-Rauxel and in Recklinghausen (Ruhr Festival). In the same year, the film producer Wolf C. Hartwig discovered the black-haired woman and used her as an attractive eye-catcher in the majority of the films he produced over the next five years.

== Selected filmography ==
- Final Destination: Red Lantern (1960)
- Horrors of Spider Island (1960)
- Satan Tempts with Love (1960)
- Island of the Amazons (1960)
- Melody of Hate (1962)
- Between Shanghai and St. Pauli (1962)
- The Hot Port of Hong Kong (1962)
- The Black Panther of Ratana (1963)
- The Pirates of the Mississippi (1963)
- The Great Skate (1964)
- Mystery of the Red Jungle (1964)
- Mission to Hell (1964)
- Massacre at Marble City (1964)

== Bibliography ==
- Warren, Bill. Keep Watching the Skies!: American Science Fiction Movies of the Fifties. McFarland, 2009.
- Weisser, Thomas. Spaghetti Westerns: The Good, the Bad, and the Violent : a Comprehensive, Illustrated Filmography of 558 Eurowesterns and Their Personnel, 1961-1977. McFarland, 1992.
