= Holiday Report =

1971 film

- Directed by: Ernst Hofbauer
- Written by: Günther Heller
- Produced by: Wolf C. Hartwig
- Starring: Sybil Danning; Astrid Frank; Werner Abrolat
- Cinematography: Giorgio Tonti
- Edited by: Herbert Taschner
- Music by: Fred Strittmaier; Peter Thomas
- Production company: Rapid Film
- Distributed by: Constantin Film
- Release date: 8 October 1971
- Running time: 102 minutes
- Country: West Germany
- Language: German

Holiday Report (German: Urlaubsreport - Worüber Reiseleiter nicht sprechen dürfen) is a 1971 West German comedy film directed by Ernst Hofbauer and starring Sybil Danning, Astrid Frank and Werner Abrolat. It was produced by Wolf C. Hartwig's Rapid Film, in an attempt to capitalise on the success of the company's hit Schoolgirl Report series.

== Cast ==
- Sybil Danning as Ina, die Anhalterin
- Astrid Frank as Andrea
- Werner Abrolat as Wieland
- Laurence Bien as Miguel
- Josef Fröhlich as Ignaz Schneider, der Urlaubspfarrer
- Max Grießer as Xaver
- Wolf Harnisch as Fred
- Hans Hass Jr. as Maxl
- Helen Vita as Gitta Mitterer
- Ralf Wolter as Horst-Dieter Mitterer
- Harald Baerow as Steinlechner
- Nadine De Rangot as Karla
- Karin Götz as Blonde Nichte von Tante Paula
- Josef Moosholzer as Wirt des Gasthofs, wo Ina mit Jürgen übernachtet
- Gernot Möhner as Franz
- Juliane Rom-Sock as Helga
- Marianne Sock as Helga
- Véronique Vendell as Tisch-Tänzerin bei Après-Ski Party
- Horst Heuck as Jürgen
- Monika Rohde as Püppi
- Evelyne Traeger as Renate Wiesbeck
- Margot Mahler
- Elisabeth Volkmann
- Jochen Mann
- Oliver Domnik
- Michael von Harbach

== Bibliography ==
- Bergfelder, Tim. International Adventures: German Popular Cinema and European Co-Productions in the 1960s. Berghahn Books, 2005.
