= The Hot Port of Hong Kong =

1962 film

- Directed by: Jürgen Roland
- Written by: Gerd Christoph; Giorgio Simonelli
- Produced by: Wolf C. Hartwig; Ludwig Spitaler
- Starring: Marianne Koch; Klausjürgen Wussow; Dominique Boschero
- Cinematography: Klaus von Rautenfeld
- Edited by: Herbert Taschner
- Music by: Gert Wilden
- Production companies: Cinematografica Associati; Rapid Film
- Distributed by: Gloria Film
- Release date: 23 May 1962
- Running time: 84 minutes
- Countries: Italy; West Germany
- Language: German

The Hot Port of Hong Kong or Hong Kong Hot Harbor (German: Heißer Hafen Hongkong) is a 1962 Italian-West German crime film directed by Jürgen Roland and starring Marianne Koch, Klausjürgen Wussow and Dominique Boschero.

The film's sets were designed by the art director Hans Berthel. It was shot on location in Hong Kong.

== Cast ==
- Marianne Koch as Joan Kent
- Klausjürgen Wussow as Peter Holberg
- Dominique Boschero as Colette May Wong
- Brad Harris as Polizeiinspektor McLean
- Horst Frank as Frank Marek
- Carlo Tamberlani as Dr. Ellington
- Dorothee Parker as Mary Hall
- Mu Chu as Li
- Hao Chen
- Renato Montalbano
- Chia Tang
- Feng Tien
- Siu Tin Yuen

== Bibliography ==
- Bergfelder, Tim. International Adventures: German Popular Cinema and European Co-Productions in the 1960s. Berghahn Books, 2005.
