= Coffin from Hong Kong (film) =

1964 film

- Directed by: Manfred R. Köhler
- Written by: James Hadley Chase (novel); Manfred R. Köhler
- Produced by: Wolf C. Hartwig; Erwin C. Dietrich
- Starring: Heinz Drache; Elga Andersen; Ralf Wolter
- Cinematography: Klaus von Rautenfeld
- Edited by: Walter Boos; Anni Lautenbacher
- Music by: Karl Barthel; Fred Strittmatter
- Production companies: Rapid Film; Les Films Jacques Leitienne
- Distributed by: Constantin Film
- Release date: 21 August 1964
- Running time: 93 minutes
- Country: West Germany
- Language: German

Coffin from Hong Kong (German: Ein Sarg aus Hongkong) is a 1964 West German/French co-production thriller film written and directed by Manfred R. Köhler in his feature film debut. It stars Heinz Drache, Elga Andersen and Ralf Wolter. It is based on the 1962 novel of the same title by James Hadley Chase.

The film's sets were designed by the art director Nino Borghi. Location shooting took place in Hong Kong and London.

== Plot ==
Jo Ann Jefferson has arrived in London from her native Crown Colony of Hong Kong with her late husband's coffin that contains more than remains. Jo Ann seeks payment from a mysterious stranger who rewards her by fatally shooting her in the office of private detective Nelson Ryan.

Discovering Jo Ann's body in his office, Ryan moves it to another room just as the late Mr. Jefferson's family arrive at Ryan's office with a lucrative assignment for him to travel to Hong Kong to investigate the late Mr. Jefferson's murder.

Ryan and his sidekick Bob Tooly face beautiful prostitutes, Jefferson's murderer and his gang as well as the Royal Hong Kong Police in dangerous and deadly adventures in Repulse Bay, Mount Butler, the Kowloon Walled City and Aberdeen, Hong Kong.

== Cast ==
- Heinz Drache as Nelson Ryan
- Elga Andersen as Stella
- Ralf Wolter as Bob Tooly
- Sabine Sesselmann as Janet West
- Angela Yu Chien as Lee Lai
- Tommy Ray as Inspector Chang
- Monika John as Miss Dickens
- Greta Chi as Jo Ann Jefferson
- Angela Bo as Yu Pei
- Henri Guégan as Fighter
- Pierre Richard as Henry Gilbert
- Michael Bulmer as Mr. Belling
- René Scheibli as Anthony
- Willy Birgel as William Jefferson

== Bibliography ==
- Bock, Hans-Michael; Bergfelder, Tim, eds. (2009). The Concise Cinegraph: Encyclopaedia of German Cinema. New York: Berghahn Books. ISBN 978-1-57181-655-9.
