= Joachim Hansen (actor) =

German actor (1930–2007)

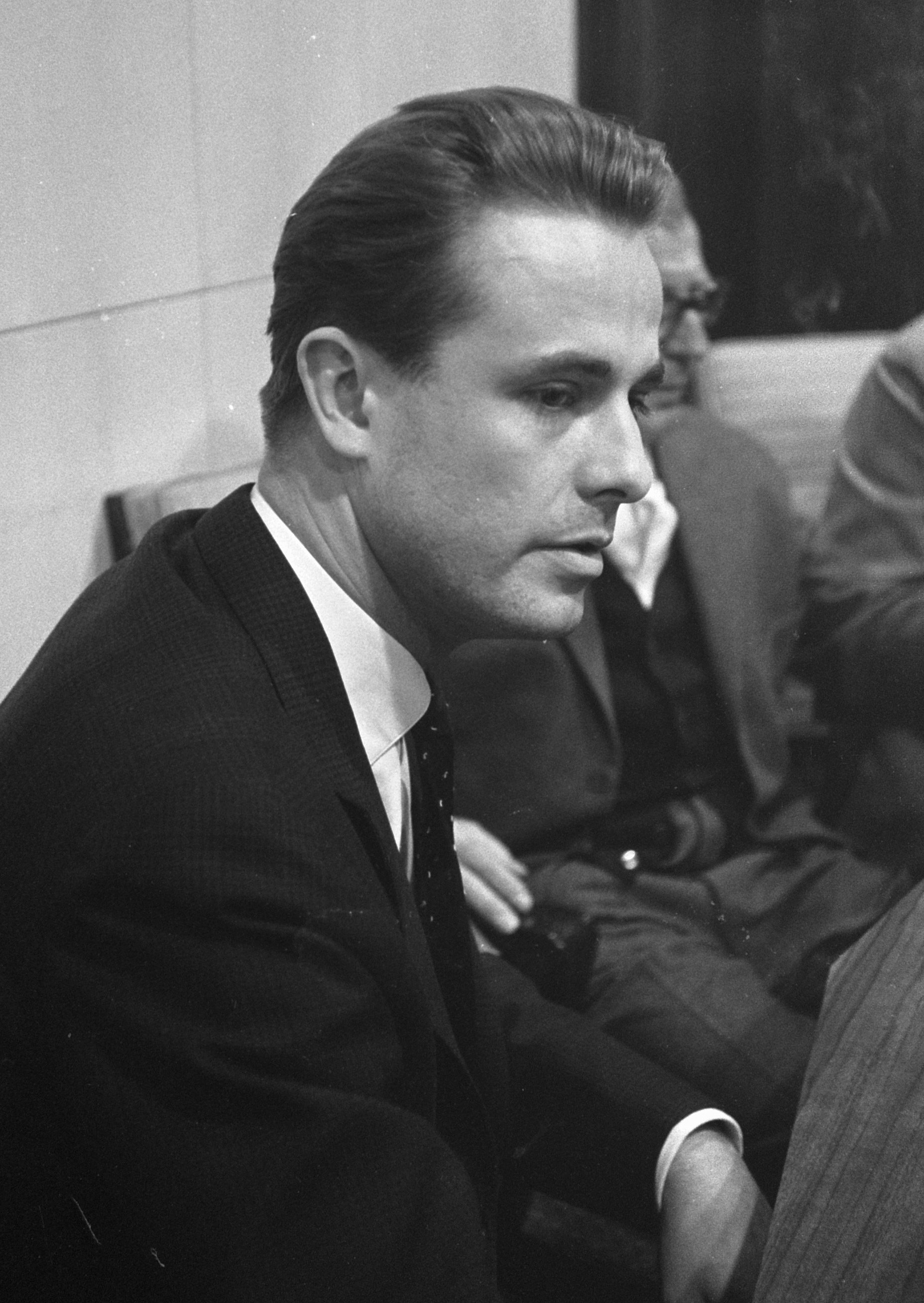
- Joachim Hansen in 1960
- Born: Joachim Spieler; 28 June 1930; Frankfurt (Oder), Germany
- Died: 13 September 2007 (aged 77); Berlin, Germany
- Occupation: Actor
- Years active: 1955–2002

Joachim Hansen (28 June 1930 – 13 September 2007) was a German actor. He was best known for film roles in the 1960s and 1970s in which he often portrayed Nazi officers and World War II German officials.

Of nearly sixty five film credits, Hansen's most notable roles include Der Stern von Afrika as Hans-Joachim Marseille, Jürgen Stroop in The Eagle Has Landed, and Generaloberst Alfred Jodl in The Winds of War and War and Remembrance mini-series.

== Selected filmography ==
- Ludwig II: Glanz und Ende eines Königs (1955) - Erzherzog Karl von Österreich, Kaiserin Elisabeths Bruder (uncredited)
- Der Stern von Afrika (1957) - Hans-Joachim Marseille
- Escape from Sahara (1958) - Kurt Gerber
- Laila (1958) - Anders Lind
- Romarei, das Mädchen mit den grünen Augen (1958) - Lorenz Ophofen
- Stalingrad: Dogs, Do You Want to Live Forever? (1959) - Oberleutnant Gerd Wisse
- The Forests Sing Forever (1959) - Young Dag
- Morgen wirst du um mich weinen (1959) - Heinz Horbach
- Der Schatz vom Toplitzsee (1959) - Reporter Wolfgang Löhde
- The High Life (1960) - Le jeune automobiliste
- Der Satan lockt mit Liebe (1960) - Robert
- The Inheritance of Bjorndal (1960) - Dag
- When the Heath Is in Bloom (1960) - Rolf
- Ordered to Love (1961) - Oberleutnant Klaus Steinbach
- Via Mala (1961) - Andreas von Richenau
- Ramona (1961) - Steinberg
- The Secret of the Black Trunk (1962) - Insp. Robert Finch
- Das Mädchen und der Staatsanwalt (1962) - Patient
- Between Shanghai and St. Pauli (1962) - Jochen
- Trompeten der Liebe (1962) - Pfarrer Johannes Röll
- Kali Yug: Goddess of Vengeance (1963) - Lt. Collins
- The Mystery of the Indian Temple (1963) - Lt. Collins
- The Cavern (1964) - German Sergeant
- Frozen Alive (1964) - Tony Stein
- Black Eagle of Santa Fe (1965) - Captain Jackson
- Diamond Walkers (1965) - Peter Wade
- Die letzten Drei der Albatros (1965) - Lieutenant Hannes Carstens
- Z7 Operation Rembrandt (1966) - Pierre
- Is Paris Burning? (1966) - Commandant prison de Fresnes
- Mission Stardust (1967) - Dr. Manoli
- Assignment K (1968) - Heinrich Herschel
- Andrea the Nympho (1968) - Peter
- The Brazen Women of Balzac (1969) - Fabian von Weyden
- The Bridge at Remagen (1969) - Capt. Otto Baumann
- Our Doctor is the Best (1969) - Professor Frederik Janssen
- Underground (1970) - Hessler
- The Butterfly Affair (1971) - Freddy
- Operation Walküre (1971, TV film) - Claus von Stauffenberg
- Sie liebten sich einen Sommer (1972)
- World on a Wire (1973, TV film) - Hans Edelkern
- Nora Helmer (1974, TV film) - Torvald Helmer
- Vous intéressez-vous à la chose? (1974) - Bernard
- Le vieux fusil (1975) - L'officier S.S.
- A Woman at Her Window (1976) - Stahlbaum
- The Eagle Has Landed (1976) - SS-Gruppenführer
- The Boys from Brazil (1978) - Fassler
- Goetz von Berlichingen of the Iron Hand (1979) - Kaiserlicher Hauptmann
- Breakthrough (1979) - Capt. Kistner
- Lucky Star (1979) - Ullrich
- Palace (1985) - Oberst Günter Priem
