= Herbert Taschner (film editor) =

German film editor

- Born: 21 July 1926; Munich, Bavaria, Germany
- Died: 18 November 1994 (aged 68); Bad Aibling, Bavaria, Germany
- Occupation: Film editor
- Years active: 1954–1980 (film)

Herbert Taschner (1926–1994) was a German film editor. Much of his work from the 1960s and 1970s was for Wolf C. Hartwig's Rapid Film. He was married to fellow film editor Ingeborg Taschner, with whom he had a son Kai Taschner.

== Selected filmography ==
- The Confession of Ina Kahr (1954)
- Wedding Bells (1954)
- Lost Child 312 (1955)
- Royal Hunt in Ischl (1955)
- The Blacksmith of St. Bartholomae (1955)
- Through the Forests and Through the Trees (1956)
- The Twins from Zillertal (1957)
- Do Not Send Your Wife to Italy (1960)
- Final Destination: Red Lantern (1960)
- Satan Tempts with Love (1960)
- The Green Archer (1961)
- Between Shanghai and St. Pauli (1962)
- The Hot Port of Hong Kong (1962)
- Melody of Hate (1962)
- The Puzzle of the Red Orchid (1962)
- The Black Panther of Ratana (1963)
- The Secret of the Chinese Carnation (1964)
- Massacre at Marble City (1964)
- The Pirates of the Mississippi (1965)
- Black Eagle of Santa Fe (1965)
- Die Letzten drei der Albatross (1965)
- Countdown to Doomsday (1966)
- A Handful of Heroes (1967)
- Lotus Flowers for Miss Quon (1967)
- Madame and Her Niece (1969)
- The Young Tigers of Hong Kong (1969)
- Angels of the Street (1969)
- Holiday Report (1971)
- The Disciplined Woman (1972)
- Love in 3-D (1973)
- The Girl from Hong Kong (1973)
- No Gold for a Dead Diver (1974)

== Bibliography ==
- Atwell, Lee (1977). G. W. Pabst. Boston: Twayne Publishers. ISBN 978-0-8057-9251-5.
