= Peter Capell =

German actor (1912–1986)

- Autographed postcard
- Born: 3 September 1912; Berlin, Kingdom of Prussia, German Empire
- Died: 3 March 1986 (aged 73); Munich, West Germany
- Occupation: Actor
- Years active: 1945–1986

Peter Capell (3 September 1912 – 3 March 1986) was a German actor who was active on screen from 1945 until 1985. Apart from a lengthy film career, he appeared in many television series and mini-series. He appeared in many old time radio programs including the series Dimension X.

His first role was in Winterset, shortly after the end of the Second World War. His final role came a year before his death, when he appeared in Mamas Geburtstag. Both of these were television productions. He also appeared in many films, including Willy Wonka & the Chocolate Factory (1971). Capell was also in Stanley Kubrick's 1957 war film Paths of Glory (he also narrated the film's opening sequence), co-starring Kirk Douglas.

== Death ==
Capell died in Munich, West Germany on March 3, 1986, aged 73. No cause of death was announced.Capell died in Munich, West Germany, on March 3, 1986, aged 73.

== Selected filmography ==
- Walk East on Beacon (1952) - Chris Zalenko / Gino
- Mein Vater, der Schauspieler (1955) - Robert Fleming
- The Story of Anastasia (1956)
- My Father, the Actor (1956)
- The Trapp Family (1956) - Ellis Island Officer
- Between Time and Eternity (1956) - Police Inspector
- Königin Luise (1957)
- The Night of the Storm (1957) - Dr. Baumgarten
- The Burglar (1957) - Baylock
- Seamen (1957) - Jim Tompson Capitain
- Paths of Glory (1957) - Narrator of Opening Sequence / Chief Judge of Court-Martial
- Nasser Asphalt (1958) - Donnagan
- The Vikings (1958) - Minor Role (uncredited)
- A Gift for Heidi (1958) - Doc.
- Taiga (1958)
- Your Body Belongs to Me (1959)
- For the First Time (1959) - Leopold Hübner
- Der Satan lockt mit Liebe (1960) - Geck
- I Aim at the Stars (1960) - Dr. Neumann
- The Big Show (1961) - Pietro Vizzini
- Armored Command (1961) - Little General
- One, Two, Three (1961) - Mishkin
- Auf Wiedersehen (1961) - Louis Holloway
- The Counterfeit Traitor (1962) - Unger (uncredited)
- Der Prozeß Carl von O. (TV film, 1964) - Mitarbeiter der 'Weltbühne'
- I Deal in Danger (1966) - Eckhardt
- Glorious Times at the Spessart Inn (1966) - Bürgermeister
- Die goldene Pille (1968) - Priest
- Assignment K (1968) - Chalet Landlord (uncredited)
- Moonlighting Mistress (1970) - Vanetti
- Wie kurz ist die Zeit zu lieben (1970) - Pater
- The Long Swift Sword of Siegfried (1971) - Priest (uncredited)
- Willy Wonka & the Chocolate Factory (1971) - The Tinker
- Schüler-Report (1971) - Arzt Dr. M. Weingärtner
- Hausfrauen-Report (1971) - Arzt
- Lover of the Great Bear (1971)
- Hausfrauen-Report 3.Teil (1971) - Lawyer
- Escape to the Sun (1972) - Prof. Abramowiz
- Junge Mädchen mögen's heiß, Hausfrauen noch heißer (1973)
- Wachtmeister Rahn (1974)
- Tod eines Fremden (1976) - Mahmoud
- Sorcerer (1977) - Lartigue
- Fedora (1978) - Second Director
- Son of Hitler (1978) - Fritz Buchmann
- The American Success Company (1980) - Lichtenstein
- Charlotte (1981) - Grandfather
- The Little Drummer Girl (1984) - Schwili

== Television ==
- Blue Light (1966) - Prof. Felix Eckhardt
- Alexander Zwo (1972) - Friedberg's solicitor
- Derrick - (1975-1984) - Drogenboß mit Schäferhund / Häftling / Dr. Bonsmann
- La Certosa di Parma (1982) - Abbé Blanes
