= Melody of Hate =

- Directed by: Ralph Lothar
- Written by: Franz Höllering; Léo Lania
- Produced by: Wolf C. Hartwig
- Starring: Maria Perschy; Horst Frank; Dietmar Schönherr
- Cinematography: Georg Krause
- Edited by: Herbert Taschner
- Music by: Borut Lesjak
- Production company: Rapid Film
- Distributed by: Europa-Filmverleih
- Release date: 18 May 1962
- Running time: 91 minutes
- Country: West Germany
- Language: German

Melody of Hate (German: Haß ohne Gnade) is a 1962 West German thriller film directed by Ralph Lothar and starring Maria Perschy, Horst Frank and Dietmar Schönherr.

== Cast ==
- Maria Perschy as Claudia / Martina
- Horst Frank as Rasan
- Dietmar Schönherr as Dr. Elmer
- Dorothee Parker as Sybille
- Otto Storr as Leitender Professor des Sanatoriums

== Bibliography ==
- Bock, Hans-Michael & Bergfelder, Tim. The Concise CineGraph. Encyclopedia of German Cinema. Berghahn Books, 2009.
