= The Girl from Hong Kong =

- Directed by: Jürgen Roland
- Written by: Herbert Reinecker (novel); Herbert Reinecker; Werner P. Zibaso
- Produced by: Wolf C. Hartwig; Dieter Nobbe; Jacques Willemetz
- Starring: Joachim Fuchsberger; Li Paelz; Véronique Vendell
- Cinematography: Klaus Werner
- Edited by: Herbert Taschner
- Music by: Gerhard Narholz
- Production companies: Les Film Jacques Willemetz; Rapid Film
- Distributed by: Constantin Film
- Release date: 30 March 1973
- Running time: 94 minutes
- Country: West Germany
- Language: German

The Girl from Hong Kong (German: Das Mädchen von Hongkong, UK theatrical title: Circle of Fear) is a 1973 West German action film directed by Jürgen Roland and starring Joachim Fuchsberger, Li Paelz and Véronique Vendell. The film's sets were designed by the art director Peter Rothe.

== Cast ==
- Joachim Fuchsberger as Frank Boyd
- Li Paelz as Mai Li
- Véronique Vendell as Meredith Harris
- Eva Garden as Catherine Harris
- Arthur Brauss as Delgado
- Grégoire Aslan as Harris
- Pierre Vernier as Richmond
- Ann Peng as Irma
- Jimmy Shaw as Edward Collins

== Bibliography ==
- Bock, Hans-Michael & Bergfelder, Tim. The Concise Cinegraph: Encyclopaedia of German Cinema. Berghahn Books, 2009.
