= Sharks on Board =

1971 film

- Directed by: Arthur Maria Rabenalt
- Written by: Rolf Olsen; August Rieger
- Based on: Sharks on Board by Rolf O. Becker-Riepen
- Produced by: Reginald Puhl
- Starring: Freddy Quinn; Karin Dor; Werner Pochath
- Cinematography: Dieter Wedekind
- Edited by: Klaus Dudenhöfer
- Music by: Karl Geithmer; Walter Heyer
- Production company: Reginald Puhl Filmproduktion
- Distributed by: Inter-Verleih Film-Gesellschaft
- Release date: 14 April 1971
- Running time: 100 minutes
- Country: West Germany
- Language: German

Sharks on Board (German: Haie an Bord) is a 1971 West German crime adventure film directed by Arthur Maria Rabenalt and starring Freddy Quinn, Karin Dor and Werner Pochath. It is based on a novel of the same title by Rolf O. Becker-Riepen. Location shooting took place around Costa Smeralda in Sardinia.

== Cast ==
- Freddy Quinn as Fred Norman
- Karin Dor as Andrea Jacobs
- Werner Pochath as Harry Lang
- Volker Bogdan as Heinz
- Franz Mosthav as Paul Barko
- Frank Reno as Mario
- Folotane Jaquino as Leutnant
- Efisio Aarbus as Bruno

== Bibliography ==
- Goble, Alan. The Complete Index to Literary Sources in Film. Walter de Gruyter, 1999.
- Korte, Helmut & Faulstich, Werner. Fischer Filmgeschichte: Zwischen Tradition und Neuorientierung, 1961-1976. Fischer Taschenbuch Verlag, 1992.
