= Werner Pochath =

Austrian actor

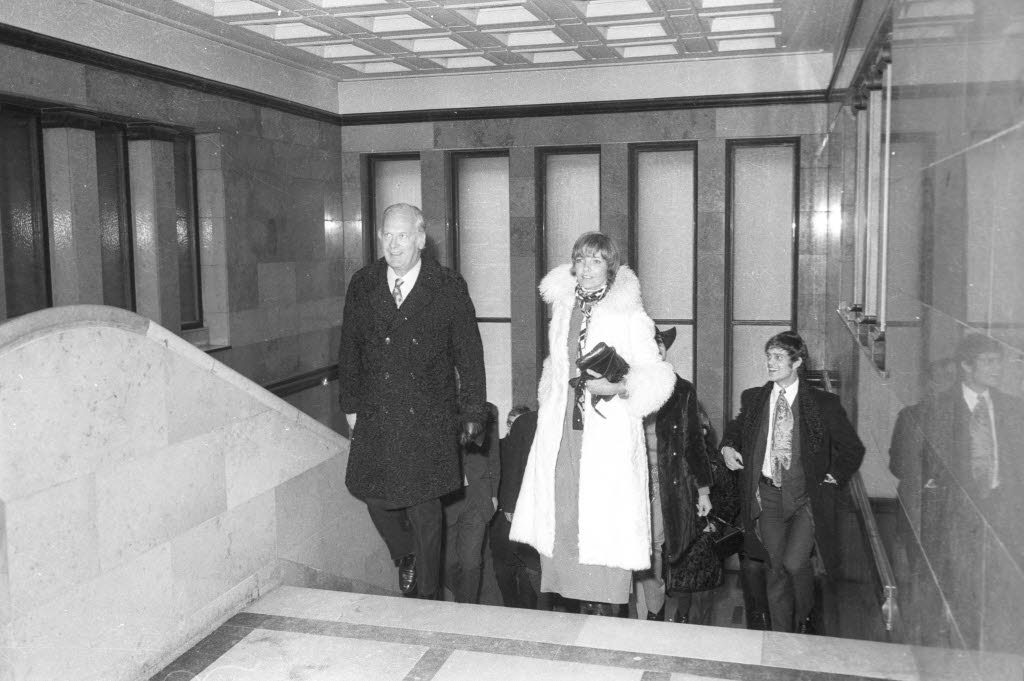
- Curd Jürgens with Gila von Weitershausen and Werner Pochath (on the far right) leaving the Metro-Kino in 1970
- Born: Werner Pochlatko; 29 September 1939; Vienna, Austria
- Died: 18 April 1993 (aged 53); Kempfenhausen, Bavaria, Germany
- Other name: Werner Pochlatko
- Occupation: film actor
- Years active: 1959–1993
- Partner: John Neumeier (until his death)

Werner Pochath (29 September 1939 – 18 April 1993) was an Austrian film actor. He worked in Germany, Italy and the United States, and then in the 1980s he began a second career as a Hollywood agent. He had been the partner of the ballet director of the Hamburg State Opera, John Neumeier.

In 2019, director Alexander Wank made a documentary about Werner called Werner Pochath, Mr Nice Guy.

== Partial filmography ==
- Stahlnetz: Der fünfte Mann (1966, TV series episode) as Dieter Hesse
- The Death of a Double (1967)) as Cutler
- The Long Day of Inspector Blomfield (1968) as Johnny Smith
- Vengeance (1968) as Ricky / Kid
- The Young Tigers of Hong Kong (1969) as Walter
- Angels of the Street (1969) as Herbert Priel
- Venus in Furs (1969) as Manfred
- Slap in the Face (1970) as Jürgen
- The Cat o' Nine Tails (1971) as Manuel
- Sharks on Board (1971) as Harry Lang
- The Iguana with the Tongue of Fire (1971) as Marc Sobiesky
- Sie nannten ihn Krambambuli (1972) as Viktor Körner
- Proklisis (1972) as Michalis
- Sonny and Jed (1972) as Pistolero
- Undine 74 (1974) as Rocker
- Challenge to White Fang (1974) as Harvey
- Two Years' Vacation (1974, TV Mini-Series) as Edward Forbes / Johnson / Käpt'n Turner
- Sky Riders (1976) as Number One Terrorist
- As of Tomorrow (1976) as Boss' Henchman
- Rosemary's Daughter (1976) as Horst
- Casanova & Co. (1977) as Fulcenzo
- BloodLust (1977) as Mosquito
- Kleinhoff Hotel (1977) as David
- Fearless (1978) as Strauss
- Flatfoot in Africa (1978) as Spiros
- Just a Gigolo (1978) as Otto
- Breakthrough (1979) as Schütze Keppel
- The Shark Hunter (1979) as Ramon
- Terror Express (1980) as David
- Maria - Nur die Nacht war ihr Zeuge (1980) as Bernd
- El caníbal (1980) as Chris
- Crazy Jungle Adventure (1982) as Clumsy
- USA, violación y venganza (1983) as Ian Moore
- Rage - Fuoco incrociato (1984) as Victor
- Wallenberg: A Hero's Story (1985, TV Movie) as SS Sergeant
- Wild Team (1985) as Theo
- Target (1985) as Secret agent
- Der Videopirat (1985)
- I giorni dell'inferno (1986) as Prof. Sanders
- Tempi di guerra (1987) as Major Dietrich
- Lethal Obsession (1987) as Resch
- La sporca insegna del coraggio (1987) as Travis Mills
- Thunder Warrior III (1988) as Colonel Magnum
- Striker (1988) as Houtman
- Let's go crazy (1988)
- Ratman (1988) as Mark
- Red Roses for a Call Girl (1988) as Ringo
- War and Remembrance (1988, TV Mini-Series) as SS Colonel
- Cop Game (1988) as Kasler
- Born to Fight (1989) as Duan Loc
- Laser Mission (1989) as Eckhardt
- Auntie Lee's Meat Pies (1992) as Billy Bob Himmler
- Venti dal Sud (1994) as Max
