= Jürgen Roland =

German filmmaker (1925–2007)

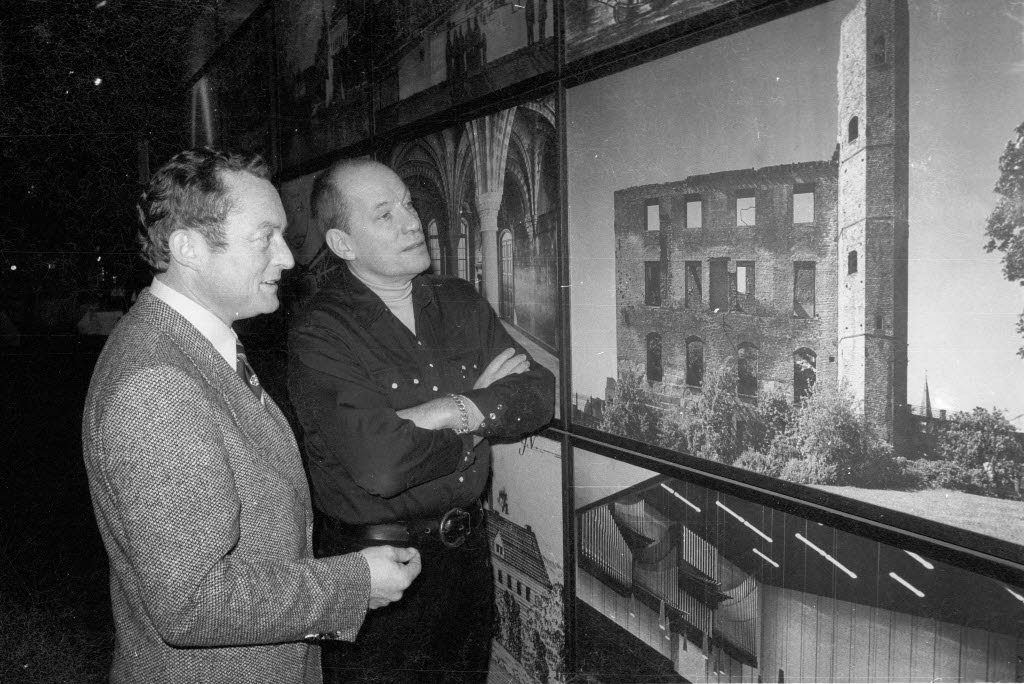
- Jürgen Roland (right)
- Born: Jürgen Schellack; 25 December 1925; Hamburg, Germany
- Died: 21 September 2007 (aged 81); Hamburg, Germany
- Occupations: Director, screenwriter, producer
- Employer(s): Nordwestdeutscher Rundfunk; Norddeutscher Rundfunk
- Known for: TV series and movies

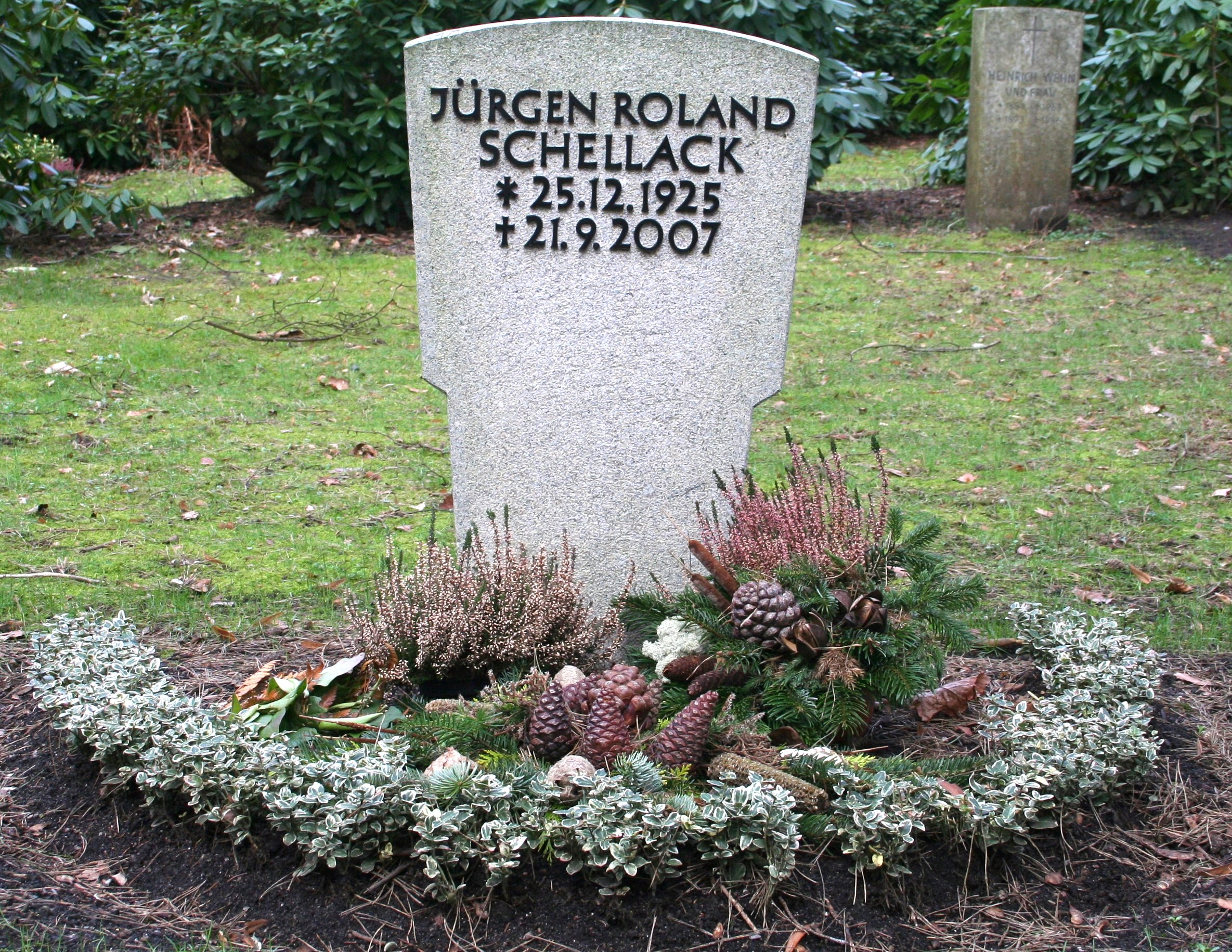
Jürgen Roland grave

Jürgen Roland, born Jürgen Schellack (25 December 1925 – 21 September 2007) was a German film director. Roland was described as the "father of German TV crime shows". He directed about 80 TV productions and 30 movies.

== Life and career ==
Roland was born on 25 December 1925 in Hamburg as Jürgen Schellack. He started his career as a radio host for the North western German Radio Station (NWDR) in 1945, and was one of the first presenters for the TV station of the NWDR in 1951. Norddeutscher Rundfunk Station Manager Jobst Plog said, that Jürgen Roland "[...] belonged to the ranks of young radio reporter, who contributed after the war to the legendary reputation of the then NWDR." Roland's first TV series Der Polizeibericht meldet ... (lit. the police reports ...) was a detailed description of real crimes, filmed accurate and faithful.

The TV series Stahlnetz (lit. steel net, Dragnet) caused Roland's fame. For the 1958s crime series, Roland worked with screenwriter Wolfgang Menge. The cases were based on real crimes also, and the series was a blockbuster in Germany. After his work for the TV station Roland directed several movies, the 1960s Der grüne Bogenschütze (The Green Archer)—starring Gert Fröbe—was based on an Edgar Wallace's novel of 1923.

Roland directed several Tatort (crime scene) episodes, and as of 2007, Roland's TV series Großstadtrevier (metropolitan precinct) was shown for 21 years in German TV.

== Filmography ==
- 1950: Only One Night (Director: Fritz Kirchhoff)
- 1955: Netz über Bord – Heringsfang auf der Nordsee (documentary)
- 1959: For Love and Others (anthology film)
- 1960: The Crimson Circle — based on The Crimson Circle by Edgar Wallace
- 1961: The Green Archer — based on The Green Archer by Edgar Wallace
- 1961: The Transport — based on a novel by Wolfgang Altendorf
- 1961: The Strange Countess (Director: Josef von Báky) — based on The Strange Countess by Edgar Wallace
- 1962: The Hot Port of Hong Kong
- 1963: The Black Panther of Ratana
- 1963: The Pirates of the Mississippi — based on a novel by Friedrich Gerstäcker
- 1964: Polizeirevier Davidswache
- 1965: Die Katze im Sack (TV film) — based on Lay Her Among the Lilies by James Hadley Chase
- 1966: 4 Schlüssel — based on a novel by Max Pierre Schaeffer
- 1967: Lotus Flowers for Miss Quon — based on A Lotus for Miss Quon by James Hadley Chase
- 1968: Einer fehlt beim Kurkonzert (TV film) — based on a novel by Hansjörg Martin
- 1969: Angels of the Street
- 1971: Jürgen Roland’s St. Pauli-Report
- 1973: The Girl from Hong Kong — based on a novel by Herbert Reinecker
- 1973: Zinksärge für die Goldjungen (Battle of the Godfathers)
- 1984: House Guest (TV film) — based on a play by Francis Durbridge
- 1995: Peter Strohm (TV series episode: Die Gräfin)

=== Stahlnetz ===
German TV series for the Norddeutscher Rundfunk, based on real crimes. Roland directed 22 episodes and was screenwriter for 2 episodes. The series is filmed in black and white, the first episode of season 1 was aired 1958. German actors Hellmut Lange and Helmut Peine were in the cast.

- 1958: Mordfall Oberhausen
- 1958: Bankraub in Köln
- 1958: Die blaue Mütze
- 1958: Die Tote im Hafenbecken
- 1958: Das zwölfte Messer
- 1958: Sechs unter Verdacht
- 1959: Treffpunkt Bahnhof Zoo
- 1959: Das Alibi
- 1959: Aktenzeichen: Welcker u. a. wegen Mordes
- 1960: Die Zeugin im grünen Rock
- 1960: Verbrannte Spuren
- 1960: E ... 605
- 1961: Saison
- 1961: In der Nacht zum Dienstag ...
- 1962: In jeder Stadt …
- 1962: Spur 211
- 1963: Das Haus an der Stör
- 1964: Rehe
- 1964: Strandkorb 421
- 1965: Nacht zum Ostersonntag
- 1966: Der fünfte Mann
- 1968: Ein Toter zuviel

=== Dem Täter auf der Spur ===
- 1967: Am Rande der Manege
- 1967: 10 Kisten Whisky
- 1968: Schrott
- 1969: Das Fenster zum Garten
- 1969: Familienärger
- 1970: Frau gesucht…
- 1970: Puppen reden nicht
- 1970: Froschmänner
- 1970: Schlagzeile: Mord
- 1971: Tod am Steuer
- 1971: Flugstunde
- 1972: In Schönheit sterben
- 1972: Ohne Kranz und Blumen
- 1972: Der Tod in der Maske
- 1972: Kein Hafer für Nicolo
- 1973: Blinder Haß
- 1973: Stellwerk 3

=== Tatort ===
- 1976: … und dann ist Zahltag (with Uwe Dallmeier as Polizeiobermeister Hesse)
- 1977: Das stille Geschäft (with Horst Bollmann as MAD-Officer Delius)
- 1979: Freund Gregor (with Horst Bollmann as MAD-Officer Delius)
- 1982: So ein Tag … (with Klaus Löwitsch as Policeman Rolfs)
- 1983: Der Schläfer (with Horst Bollmann as MAD-Officer Delius)
- 1985: Acht, neun – aus (with Klaus Löwitsch as Policeman Dietze)
- 1985: Baranskis Geschäft (with Horst Bollmann as MAD-Officer Delius)
- 1989: Keine Tricks, Herr Bülow (with Heinz Drache as Police Inspector Bülow)
- 1991: Tod eines Mädchens (with Manfred Krug as Police Inspector Stoever)
- 1992: Stoevers Fall (with Manfred Krug as Police Inspector Stoever)
- 1995: Tod eines Polizisten (with Manfred Krug as Police Inspector Stoever)
- 1997: Ausgespielt (with Manfred Krug as Police Inspector Stoever)

==== As actor ====
- 1988: Pleitegeier, as Anton Marek
- 2001: Tod vor Scharhörn, as Polizeipräsident von Hamburg (Head of the Hamburg Police Department)

=== Großstadtrevier ===
Roland directed 46 episodes of the German TV series Großstadtrevier (metropolitan precinct), produced by the Norddeutscher Rundfunk.

- 1986: Kein Tag wie jeder andere
- 1986: Wühlmäuse
- 1986: Mensch, der Bulle ist 'ne Frau
- 1986: Speedy
- 1986: Prosit Neujahr
- 1987: Amamos und Konsorten
- 1987: Der Champ
- 1987: Fahrerflucht
- 1987: Rote Karte für Thomas?
- 1989: Dame in Not (Kommentator)
- 1991: Das schwarze Schaf
- 1991: Treffpunkt Kino
- 1992: Der Neue (including Roland's voice)
- 1992: Auf Gift gebaut (appearances as officer-in-charge)
- 1992: Revanche (appearance as hall speaker)
- 1997: Der Praktikant
- 1997: Das Stuntgirl
- 1997: Die Aufsteiger
- 1999: Zeugen
