= Victim Five =

1964 British crime film by Robert Lynn

- US film poster
- Directed by: Robert Lynn
- Screenplay by: Peter Yeldham
- Story by: Peter Welbeck
- Produced by: Arthur "Skip" Steloff
- Starring: Lex Barker; Ronald Fraser; Walter Rilla; Dietmar Schönherr; Ann Smyrner; Véronique Vendell
- Cinematography: Nicolas Roeg
- Edited by: John Trumper
- Music by: Johnny Douglas
- Production company: Towers of London Productions
- Distributed by: British Lion Films
- Release dates: 10 July 1964 (West Germany); 19 May 1965 (United States)
- Running time: 88 minutes
- Country: United Kingdom
- Language: English

Victim Five (also known as Code 7, Victim 5! and Code Seven, Victim Five), is a 1964 British crime film directed by Robert Lynn and starring Lex Barker, Ronald Fraser, Ann Smyrner, and Walter Rilla. It was produced by Harry Alan Towers and US television producer Arthur "Skip" Steloff and was shot in Cape Town in Technicolor and Techniscope. The cinematographer was Nicolas Roeg.

== Plot ==
New York City private detective Steve Martin is hired for protection by Wexler, a wealthy German living in Cape Town. After Wexler's butler is murdered and an assassination attempt is made on Martin and Wexler's secretary Helga, Martin discovers a photograph of four people, including Wexler and his butler, that indicates that all those in the picture are marked for death and there will be five victims.

== Cast ==
- Lex Barker as Steve Martin
- Ronald Fraser as Inspector Dickie Lean
- Ann Smyrner as Helga Swenson
- Véronique Vendell as Gina
- Walter Rilla as Wexler
- Dietmar Schönherr as Dr. Paul Bryson
- Percy Sieff as George Anderson
- Gustel Gundelach as Hans Kramer
- Gert Van den Bergh as Vanberger
- Howard Davis as Rawlings
- Sophia Kammara as Leila

== Critical reception ==
The New York Times praised "fine views of Cape Town" but thought the film was not "necessary".

The Monthly Film Bulletin wrote: "The basic narrative is one of the classic old-style murder thrillers of the kind perfected by Edgar Wallace and Philip Macdonald, and is efficiently worked out. Most of the acting is unremarkable, but what undoubtedly heightens the film's interest is the large variety of South African locations, often spectacular, and well integrated into the story."

Variety wrote: "Poor man's James Bond has plenty of action but little wit. Still another "takeoff" on the successful James Bond films, this British-produced but South African-filmed variation has enough action and scenic beauty to enable it to do well in the thriller market. These assets aren't enough, however, to expect much more than routine success by today's more demanding standards. Originally titled Table Bay, a reference to its scenic Capetown background, producer Harry Alan Towers and director Robert Lynn have attempted to pad out a weak script with much emphasis on violence, sex and comedy. The photogenic backdrop, which includes sidetrips into a fantastic cavern, ostrich farms, big game country and beaucoup bathing beaches, is film's chief asset, helped by a good comedy performance by Ronald Fraser. ... Nicholas Roeg and Egil S. Woxholt's color camerawork is very complimentary to the country."
