= All the Sins of the Earth =

1958 film

- Directed by: Fritz Umgelter
- Written by: Johannes Kai
- Produced by: Wolf C. Hartwig
- Starring: Barbara Rütting; Ivan Desny; Paul Dahlke
- Cinematography: Kurt Hasse
- Edited by: Friedel Buckow
- Music by: Klaus Ogermann
- Production company: Rapid Film
- Distributed by: Union-Film
- Release date: 21 February 1958
- Running time: 108 minutes
- Country: West Germany
- Language: German

All the Sins of the Earth (German: Alle Sünden dieser Erde) is a 1958 West German drama film directed by Fritz Umgelter and starring Barbara Rütting, Ivan Desny and Paul Dahlke.

== Cast ==
- Barbara Rütting as Dr. Regine Lenz
- Ivan Desny as Lawyer Stephan Hardeck
- Paul Dahlke as Dr. Volkert
- Hannelore Bollmann as Marion Blanc-Evert
- Wolfgang Büttner as Father Hildebrand
- Herbert Kroll as Lenz's Father
- Albert Lieven as Judge
- Peter Vogel as Willi Lenz
- Elfe Gerhart
- Dieter Kirchlechner

== Bibliography ==
- Bock, Hans-Michael; Bergfelder, Tim, eds. (2009). The Concise Cinegraph: Encyclopaedia of German Cinema. New York: Berghahn Books. ISBN 978-1-57181-655-9.
