= Förster Horn =

- Starring: Heinz Engelmann
- Country of origin: West Germany

Förster Horn is a German television series.

== See also ==
- List of German television series
