= No Gold for a Dead Diver =

1974 film

- Cast including Marius Weyers, Monika Lundi and Sandra Prinsloo
- Directed by: Harald Reinl
- Written by: Jürgen Goslar; Heinz G. Konsalik (novel)
- Produced by: Jürgen Goslar; Jochen Graubner; Wolf C. Hartwig
- Starring: Horst Janson; Monika Lundi; Marius Weyers
- Cinematography: Franz Xaver Lederle
- Edited by: Herbert Taschner
- Production companies: Rapid Film; Terra Film
- Distributed by: Constantin Film
- Release date: 15 March 1974
- Running time: 95 minutes
- Country: West Germany
- Language: German

No Gold for a Dead Diver (German: Ein toter Taucher nimmt kein Gold) is a 1974 West German adventure film directed by Harald Reinl and starring Horst Janson, Monika Lundi and Marius Weyers. A thriller about deep sea divers searching for buried treasure, it was shot on location in South Africa. The film's sets were designed by the art director Dieter Bartels.

After the success of Jaws (1975), the film was released in the US with the title Deadly Jaws.

== Plot ==
Three adventurous young Germans come into possession of a treasure map showing the supposed location of a Spanish treasure ship that sank during a storm more than four centuries earlier. The ship is said to have been carrying several chests of gold worth 4.5 billion Deutschmarks. The three friends travel to the Caribbean to search for the treasure, accompanied by a diving instructor and his partner.

Life aboard the salvage vessel soon becomes difficult as tensions develop among the group. The heavily armed diving instructor and his partner are also secretly planning to keep the treasure for themselves. During the dives, the group faces further dangers in the form of aggressive sharks and a giant octopus. Meanwhile, other treasure hunters learn of the expedition and attack the group in their boats. After considerable effort, the treasure is finally recovered, but the police confiscate it.

== Cast ==
- Horst Janson as Hans Faerber
- Hans Hass Jr. as Peter Damms
- Marius Weyers as René Chagrin
- Monika Lundi as Ellen
- Sandra Prinsloo as Pascale
- Keith Grenville as Coast Guard Captain
- Percy Sieff as Don Pedro
- Bill Flynn as Thug
- Len Sparrowhawk as Jeweler
- Gordon Van Rooyen as Hotel Manager
- Philip Boucher (uncredited)
- Christian Bruckner as Hans Faerber (voice) (uncredited)
- Gert Gunther Hoffmann as Erzahler (voice) (uncredited)

== Home video ==
In October 2017, RetroVision Entertainment released the film on DVD, paired with Night of the Sharks.

== Bibliography ==
- Bock, Hans-Michael; Bergfelder, Tim, eds. (2009). The Concise Cinegraph: Encyclopaedia of German Cinema. New York: Berghahn Books. ISBN 978-1-57181-655-9.
