= Breakthrough (1979 film) =

1979 war film

- Directed by: Andrew V. McLaglen
- Written by: Peter Berneis / Tony Williamson
- Produced by: Wolf C. Hartwig; Herbert Lukowski
- Starring: Richard Burton; Robert Mitchum; Rod Steiger; Michael Parks; Curd Jurgens; Helmut Griem; Klaus Löwitsch
- Music by: Peter Thomas
- Production companies: Palladium Film; Rapid Film
- Distributed by: Constantin Film; Maverick Pictures International (US)
- Release date: 1979
- Running time: 111 minutes (German version); 115 minutes (English version)
- Country: West Germany
- Language: German / English
- Budget: $7.2 million

Breakthrough, also released as Steiner - Das Eiserne Kreuz, 2 and Sergeant Steiner is a 1979 war film set on the Western Front, specifically the Normandy coastline. The picture is a sequel to Sam Peckinpah's Cross of Iron, and includes several characters from that film.

The film stars several big names including Richard Burton, Robert Mitchum and Rod Steiger. Burton (Sergeant Steiner) and Helmut Griem (Major Stransky) assume the roles played by James Coburn and Maximilian Schell respectively in the original film. The supporting cast features Michael Parks and Curd Jürgens. This also marks the film debut of Christoph Waltz, playing an uncredited role. Klaus Löwitsch is the only actor from Cross of Iron to reprise his role.

== Plot ==
Starting in late May 1944, during the German retreat on the Eastern Front, Captain Stransky (Helmut Griem) orders Sergeant Steiner (Richard Burton) to blow up a railway tunnel to prevent Russian forces from using it. Steiner's platoon fails in its mission after coming up against a Russian tank. He then takes a furlough to Paris just as the Allies launch their invasion of Normandy.

Steiner's unit is transferred to France, occupying the village of St Bologne. General Hoffman (Curd Jürgens) orders Steiner to cross into nearby enemy territory and confer with American Colonel Rogers (Robert Mitchum) and General Webster (Rod Steiger), informing him that the High Command of the German Army (Wehrmacht) is plotting to assassinate Hitler and would like to surrender. The plan fails and American forces launch an attack on German forces in St Bologne where Stransky has planned an explosion to destroy both the Americans and the civilian inhabitants.

Colonel Rogers and Sgt. Anderson take a jeep with a white flag and approach St Bologne. The Germans fire on them per Stransky’s orders. Rogers and Anderson return to the tanks. The Americans start toward St. Bologne, unaware of the explosives planted in the town.

Steiner tells Stransky not to go ahead with the explosions. Stransky shoots him and leaves.

The German look-outs are killed. As the Americans enter the square the Germans prepare to set off the dynamite. Steiner, still alive, disconnects the main switch connecting the explosions. He then goes up the stairs and shoots the German soldiers and Stransky, saving Rogers’ life. The Germans start firing on the tanks. Steiner moves civilians out of the line of fire. The remaining Germans surrender.

Steiner walks through the burning town. One of the Germans shoots Anderson. Steiner shoots the German soldier, saving Rogers again.

Steiner clearly sympathises more with the Americans, even to the extent of killing his fellow soldiers.

== Cast ==
- Richard Burton as Sergeant Rolf Steiner
- Robert Mitchum as Colonel Rogers
- Rod Steiger as General Webster
- Michael Parks as Sergeant Anderson
- Curd Jürgens as General Hoffmann
- Helmut Griem as Captain/Major von Stransky
- Klaus Löwitsch as Corporal Krüger
- Christoph Waltz as Paramedic
- Günter Meisner as SS Officer
- Horst Janson as Captain Berger
- Werner Pochath as Schütze Keppel
- Joachim Hansen as Hauptmann Kistner
- Sieghardt Rupp as Gefreiter Rothe
- Hans-Jürgen Schatz as Kompanieschreiber Schulze
- Dieter Schidor as Paul Anselm

== Reception and criticism ==
Breakthrough was mostly financed by West German producers when it was released in 1979, after several changes were made to the sequel: for instance, the action was relocated from Russia to the Western Front and Richard Burton replaced Coburn as Sgt Steiner. The film was panned by critics, who identified a confusing plot, poor dialogue, an aged cast and undistinguished acting.
