= Between Shanghai and St. Pauli =

1962 film

- Directed by: Roberto Bianchi Montero; Wolfgang Schleif
- Written by: J. Joachim Bartsch
- Produced by: Wolf C. Hartwig
- Starring: Karin Baal; Joachim Hansen; Horst Frank
- Cinematography: Klaus von Rautenfeld
- Edited by: Herbert Taschner
- Music by: Raimund Rosenberger
- Production companies: Cinematografica Associati; Rapid Film
- Distributed by: Gloria Film
- Release date: 5 October 1962
- Running time: 86 minutes
- Countries: West Germany; Italy
- Language: German

Between Shanghai and St. Pauli (German: Zwischen Schanghai und St. Pauli, Italian: I rinnegati di Capitan Kidd) is a 1962 West German-Italian crime adventure film directed by Roberto Bianchi Montero and Wolfgang Schleif and starring Karin Baal, Joachim Hansen and Horst Frank. It is also known by the alternative title Voyage to Danger. The film's sets were designed by the art director Hans Berthel.

== Plot ==
A violent bar fight leads to Carlos, Blacky and Jochen joining the crew of the ramshackle freighter 'Trinidad'. It turns out that the decrepit ship with its expensive cargo is about to be blown up as part of an insurance fraud devised by the unscrupulous criminal Frederic and his accomplice Diana. Everything changes after it turns out that Vera Anden, a millionaire's daughter, is also on board. Frederic is the secretary to her father, a rich businessman, and wants to extort a high ransom. But the three protagonists take command of the ship following a wild shootout off the African coast. During a scuffle to capture Diana and Frederic, the criminal mastermind is able to detonate an explosive device attached to the ship. The freighter sinks, but the three friends and Vera Anden manage to make it ashore, where the rogue couple is taken away in handcuffs by the Moroccan police.

== Cast ==
- Karin Baal as Vera
- Joachim Hansen as Jochen
- Horst Frank as Frederic
- Carlo Giustini as Carlos
- Ugo Sasso as Kapitän Brinkmann
- Luisella Boni as Diana
- Carmela Corren as Sängerin in der Bar
- Mario del Marius as Quieto
- Dorothee Parker as Diana
- Bill Ramsey as Blacky

== Bibliography ==
- Bock, Hans-Michael & Bergfelder, Tim. The Concise CineGraph. Encyclopedia of German Cinema. Berghahn Books, 2009.
- Zhou, Qingyang Freya, Shen, Qinna & Fitzpatrick, Zach Ramon. Charting Asian German Film History: Imagination, Collaboration, and Diasporic Representation. Camden House, 2025.
