= Gert Wilden =

Gert Wilden (born Gert Wychodil; 15 April 1917 – 10 September 2015) was a German film composer.

== Biography ==
He was born in Mährisch Trübau. From 1956 through his retirement, he scored music for 50 feature films in numerous genres, including the German versions of Harry Alan Towers' Fu Manchu films.

He also is known for his music for erotic films in the 1970s, especially the Schoolgirl Report (Schulmädchen Report) series.

== Personal life ==
Wilden was married to former actress and singer Trude Hofmeister. Wilden died on 10 September 2015, aged 98.

== Selected filmography ==
- Mikosch, the Pride of the Company (1958)
- At Blonde Kathrein's Place (1959)
- The Mystery of the Green Spider (1960)
- Adieu, Lebewohl, Goodbye (1961)
- Ramona (1961)
- Robert and Bertram (1961)
- Café Oriental (1962)
- When the Music Plays at Wörthersee (1962)
- The Secret of the Black Trunk (1962)
- The Hot Port of Hong Kong (1962)
- The Black Panther of Ratana (1963)
- Holiday in St. Tropez (1964)
- Black Eagle of Santa Fe (1965)
- Hotel of Dead Guests (1965)
- 13 Days to Die (1965)
- Come to the Blue Adriatic (1966)
- Madame and Her Niece (1969)
- The Young Tigers of Hong Kong (1969)
- Schulmädchen-Report (1970)
