= Werner P. Zibaso =

German screenwriter

- Born: 5 August 1910; Bad Homburg vor der Höhe, Hesse, German Empire
- Died: 23 April 1983 (aged 72); Berg, Bavaria, West Germany
- Occupation: Writer
- Years active: 1937-1980 (film)

Werner P. Zibaso (5 August 1910–23 April 1983) was a German screenwriter.

== Selected filmography ==
- Gordian the Tyrant (1937)
- Everything Will Be Better in the Morning (1948)
- It Began at Midnight (1951)
- When the Evening Bells Ring (1951)
- A Thousand Red Roses Bloom (1952)
- We'll Talk About Love Later (1953)
- When The Village Music Plays on Sunday Nights (1953)
- Daybreak (1954)
- Jackboot Mutiny (1955)
- Lost Child 312 (1955)
- The Old Forester House (1956)
- The Golden Bridge (1956)
- Where the Ancient Forests Rustle (1956)
- Winter in the Woods (1956)
- Ballerina (1956)
- Black Forest Melody (1956)
- The Doctor of Stalingrad (1958)
- The Girl with the Cat's Eyes (1958)
- The Priest and the Girl (1958)
- The Domestic Tyrant (1959)
- Nick Knatterton’s Adventure (1959)
- We Will Never Part (1960)
- An Alibi for Death (1963)
- Die Letzten drei der Albatross (1965)
- A Handful of Heroes (1967)
- Love Nights in the Taiga (1967)
- Emma Hamilton (1968)
- Madame and Her Niece (1969)
- Moonlighting Mistress (1970)
- Tiger Gang (1971)
- Housewives on the Job (1972)
- Nurse Report (1972)
- The Girl from Hong Kong (1973)
- Hubertus Castle (1973)
- The Hunter of Fall (1974)
- Crime After School (1975)
- Silence in the Forest (1976)
- Arrête ton char... bidasse! (1977)
- Women in Hospital (1977)
- Inn of the Sinful Daughters (1978)
- Tendres Cousines (1980)

== Bibliography ==
- Rentschler, Eric. The Films of G.W. Pabst: An Extraterritorial Cinema. Rutgers University Press, 1990.
