= Wolfgang Becker (director, born 1910) =

German film director and editor (1910–2005)

- Born: 15 May 1910; Berlin, German Empire
- Died: 30 January 2005 (aged 94); Munich, Bavaria, Germany
- Occupations: Film director, film editor
- Years active: 1931–1992 (film and TV)

Wolfgang Becker (German pronunciation: [ˈvɔlfɡaŋ ˈbɛkɐ]; 15 May 1910 – 30 January 2005) was a German film director and film editor.

== Selected filmography ==
=== Editor ===
- The Night Without Pause (1931)
- Spoiling the Game (1932)
- Spell of the Looking Glass (1932)
- For Once I'd Like to Have No Troubles (1932)
- The Star of Valencia (1933)
- The Country Schoolmaster (1933)
- A Door Opens (1933)
- Gold (1934)
- Love, Death and the Devil (1934)
- Frisians in Peril (1935)
- Marriage Strike (1935)
- Ninety Minute Stopover (1936)
- The Coral Princess (1937)
- Meiseken (1937)
- The Chief Witness (1937)
- The Great and the Little Love (1938)
- Secret Mission (1938)
- The Woman at the Crossroads (1938)
- Stars of Variety (1939)
- Via Mala (1945)
- And the Heavens Above Us (1947)
- The Last Illusion (1949)

=== Director ===
- Heroism after Hours (1955)
- Rosmarie kommt aus Wildwest (1956)
- Der Etappenhase (1957)
- Voyage to Italy, Complete with Love (1958)
- I Was All His (1958)
- Peter Voss, Thief of Millions (1958)
- The Merry War of Captain Pedro (1959)
- Everybody Loves Peter (1959)
- Die letzten Drei der Albatros (1965)
- Der Tod läuft hinterher (1967, TV miniseries)
- Babeck (1968, TV miniseries)
- Der Kommissar (1969–1975, TV series, 18 episodes)
- Ellenbogenspiele (1969)
- Hotel Royal (1969, TV film)
- 11 Uhr 20 (1970, TV miniseries)
- Moonlighting Mistress (1970)
- The Eddie Chapman Story (1971, TV film)
- Der kleine Doktor (1974, TV series, 6 episodes)
- Tatort: Acht Jahre später (1974, TV series episode)
- Tatort: Zweikampf (1974, TV series episode)
- Derrick (1975–1992, TV series, 11 episodes)
- Tatort: Die Abrechnung (1975, TV series episode)
- Tatort: Treffpunkt Friedhof (1975, TV series episode)
- Tatort: Fortuna III (1976, TV series episode)
- Tatort: Abendstern (1976, TV series episode)
- The Old Fox (1977–1988, TV series, 5 episodes)
- Tatort: Drei Schlingen (1977, TV series episode)
- Die Vorstadtkrokodile (1977, TV film)
- Tatort: Rechnung mit einer Unbekannten (1978, TV series episode)
- Tatort: Lockruf (1978, TV series episode)
- Es begann bei Tiffany (1979, TV film)
- Von einem Tag zum anderen (1981, TV film)
- Tatort: Peggy hat Angst (1983, TV series episode)
- Damenwahl (1985, TV film)

== Bibliography ==
- Bock, Hans-Michael & Bergfelder, Tim. The Concise Cinegraph: Encyclopaedia of German Cinema. Berghahn Books, 2009.
