= The Pirates of the Mississippi (film) =

1963 film

- Directed by: Jürgen Roland
- Screenplay by: Werner P. Zibaso; Johannes Kai
- Based on: The Pirates of the Mississippi by Friedrich Gerstäcker
- Produced by: Wolf C. Hartwig
- Cinematography: Rolf Kästel
- Edited by: Herbert Taschner
- Music by: Willi Mattes
- Production companies: Societé Nouvelle de Cinématographie (S.N.C.); Produzione Gianni Fuchs; Rapid-Film GmbH
- Distributed by: Gloria Film
- Release date: 18 October 1963 (West Germany)
- Running time: 102 minutes
- Countries: West Germany; France; Italy

The Pirates of the Mississippi (German: Die Flußpiraten vom Mississippi) is a Western film directed by Jürgen Roland and starring Hansjörg Felmy, Brad Harris and Sabine Sinjen. A Eurowestern, it was a co-production between West Germany, France and Italy. Based on the 1848 novel by Friedrich Gerstäcker, the film was the first pairing of Brad Harris and Tony Kendall with Gianfranco Parolini as a second unit director. Kendall reprised his role of Chief Black Eagle in Black Eagle of Santa Fe (1965).

The film's sets were designed by the art directors Hans Berthel and Johannes Ott.

== Plot ==
Based on an island in the Mississippi River a pirate gang terrorize the town of Helena and the steamboats. Sheriff James Lively can't stop pirate boss Kelly from tricking the Cherokees into helping him attack a steamboat with a precious cargo.

== Cast ==
- Hansjörg Felmy as Sheriff James Lively
- Brad Harris as Tom Cook
- Sabine Sinjen as Evelyn
- Horst Frank as Kelly
- Dorothee Parker as Georgia
- Karl Lieffen as Doc Monrove
- Tony Kendall as Schwarzer Adler
- Barbara Simon as Wichita
- Luigi Batzella as Squire Dayton
- Jeannette Batti as Mrs. Bridleford
- Dan Vadis as Blackfoot
- Danilo Turk as Uncle Jonathan
- Vladimir Bacic as Frank

== Release ==
The Pirates of the Mississippi was released in France on 13 October 1965. It passed German censors on 18 October 1963 and was released to television in West Germany on 22 June 1969.

== Bibliography ==
- Pitts, Michael R. Western Movies: A Guide to 5,105 Feature Films. McFarland, 2012.
