= Black Eagle of Santa Fe =

1965 film

Die Schwarzen Adler von Santa Fe
- Directed by: Alberto Cardone (as Albert Cardiff); Ernst Hofbauer (as Ernest Goodman)
- Written by: Valeria Bonamano; Jack Lewis
- Produced by: Mario Siciliano; Gunther Raguse; Wolf C. Hartwig
- Starring: Brad Harris; Joachim Hansen; Horst Frank; Tony Kendall
- Cinematography: Hans Jura
- Edited by: Herbert Taschner
- Music by: Gert Wilden
- Distributed by: Constantin Film
- Release dates: 12 March 1965 (West Germany); 28 August 1965 (Italy)
- Running time: 95 minutes
- Countries: West Germany; Italy
- Language: German

Black Eagle of Santa Fe (German: Die Schwarzen Adler von Santa Fe) is a 1965 West German and Italian international co-production western film directed by Alberto Cardone and Ernst Hofbauer.

== Story ==
Ranch workers disguised as soldiers murder Indians in order to stir up trouble with the whites so the rancher can claim their land.

== Plot ==
Landowner Morton wants to expand his property because he knows about oil deposits under the Indian territory. Settlers also come to the area, as a peace treaty with the Comanches provides security. Disguised as soldiers, Morton has his men attack the Indians. Black Eagle, the chief of the Comanche, then digs up the hatchet. After a bloody raid, the village's surviving settlers seek shelter in the nearby fort commanded by Captain Jackson. Due to the peace treaty, however, the garrison is undermanned and Jackson is unable to act. He hires trapper Clint McPherson to investigate the cause of the Indian uprising, uncovering Morton's deceitful plan, which he tells Black Eagle. He and the Indians arrive at the fort just in time to assist the soldiers and settlers against the attack by Morton's men.

== Production ==
Jack Lewis recalled that Ron Ormond asked him to write a draft of a script based on a magazine story called Fort Disaster adding Indians, cavalry and Frank and Jesse James. When Ormond passed on the screenplay, Lewis retitled his screenplay Massacre Mountain and gave it to his agent Ilse Lahn Waitzerkorn who several years later leased his script to Constantin Film. The Germans used the screenplay to bring back Tony Kendall as Black Eagle from The Pirates of the Mississippi with his frequent film partner Brad Harris. Joining Harris was his future wife Olga Schoberová who appeared with Harris in Massacre at Marble City.

== Cast ==
- Brad Harris as Cliff/Clint McPhearson
- Horst Frank as Blade Carpenter
- Tony Kendall as Chief Black Eagle
- Pinkas Braun as Gentleman
- Joachim Hansen as Captain Jackson
- Werner Peters as Morton
- Ennio Girolami (as Thomas Moore) as Tom Howard/Slim James
- Edith Hancke as Cora Morton
- Joseph Egger as Buddy
- Serge Marquand as Brad Howard/Chet 'Blacky'James
- Olga Schoberová as Lana Miller
- Jacques Bézard (as Jackie Bezard) as Pasqual
- Ángel Ortiz as Sergeant
- Annie Giss as Madam
- Lorenzo Robledo as courier

== Reception ==
Black Eagle of Santa Fe is considered a contemporary homage to the Karl May film adaptations.
