= Massacre at Marble City =

1964 film

- Directed by: Paul Martin
- Written by: Hans Billian; Herbert Reinecker; Werner P. Zibaso
- Produced by: Wolf C. Hartwig
- Starring: Mario Adorf; Brad Harris
- Cinematography: Jan Stallich
- Edited by: Herbert Taschner
- Music by: Heinz Gietz; Francesco De Masi
- Production companies: Constantin Film; Rapid Film; Metheus Film; Société Nouvelle de Cinématographie
- Distributed by: Constantin Film
- Release date: 20 November 1964
- Running time: 98 minutes
- Countries: France; Italy; West Germany
- Language: German

Massacre at Marble City (German: Die Goldsucher von Arkansas, French: Les chercheurs d'or de l'Arkansas, Italian: Alla conquista dell'Arkansas, released in U.K. as Conquerors of Arkansas) is a 1964 German-French-Italian Western film directed by Paul Martin and starring Mario Adorf and Brad Harris. It is loosely based on Friedrich Gerstäcker's 1845 novel Die Regulatoren von Arkansas. It was shot on location in Czechoslovakia.

== Cast ==
- Brad Harris as Phil Stone
- Mario Adorf as Matt Ellis
- Horst Frank as Dan McCormick
- Dorothee Parker as Jane Brendel
- Olga Schoberová as Mary Brendel
- Ralf Wolter as Tim Fletcher
- Marianne Hoppe as Mrs. Brendel
- Dieter Borsche as Pastor Benson
- Thomas Alder as Erik Brendel
- Joseph Egger as Fishbury
- Philippe Lemaire as Jim Donovan
- Fulvia Franco as Ilona
- Serge Marquand as Fielding
