= Countdown to Doomsday (film) =

1966 film

- Directed by: Marcello Baldi
- Written by: Marcello Baldi; Lionello De Felice; Giovanni Simonelli; Karl-Heinz Vogelmann
- Starring: George Ardisson; Pascale Audret
- Cinematography: Victor Monreal
- Edited by: Herbert Taschner
- Music by: Claude Bolling
- Release dates: 9 September 1966 (West Germany); October 1966 (Italy); 28 June 1967 (France)
- Running time: 93 minutes
- Countries: Italy; France; West Germany
- Language: Italian

Countdown to Doomsday (German: Fünf vor 12 in Caracas, Italian: Inferno a Caracas, French: Ça casse à Caracas) is a 1966 West German-Italian-French Eurospy film written and directed by Marcello Baldi and starring George Ardisson. It was the last spy film of Ardisson. The film was a box office disappointment.

== Plot ==
A Private Detective is hired by a rich oil baron to find his kidnapped Daughter. After many encounters with local gangsters, Jeff Merlin finds the girl strapped to a bomb.

== Cast ==
- George Ardisson as Jeff Milton
- Pascale Audret as Florence
- Christa Linder as Helen Remington
- Luciana Angiolillo as Mrs. Violet Watson
- Harald Leipnitz as Alan Shepperton
- Horst Frank as Dr. Soarez
- Patrick Bernhard as Kidnapper
- Sal Borgese as Second Kidnapper
- María Julia Díaz as Dolores del Santos
- Marion Grant as Gloria
- Josep Castillo Escalona as Inspector Saban
