= Georg Krause =

German cinematographer

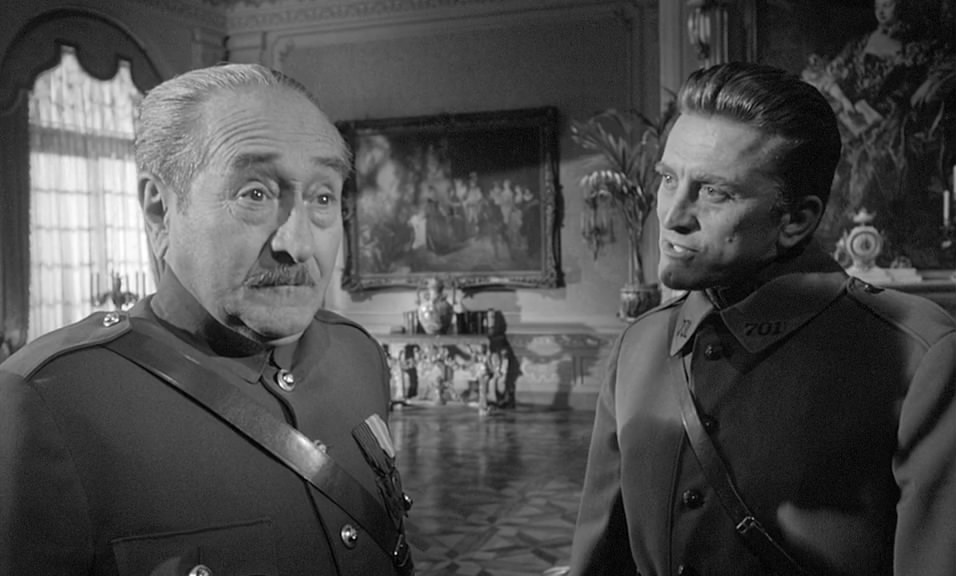
- Krause was cinematographer for Paths of Glory, featuring Adolphe Menjou and Kirk Douglas
- Born: 15 April 1901; Berlin, German Empire
- Died: 3 January 1986 (aged 84); Garmisch-Partenkirchen, West Germany
- Occupation: Cinematographer
- Years active: 1923–1967

Georg Krause (15 April 1901 – 3 January 1986) was a German cinematographer who worked on more than a hundred and thirty film and television productions during his career. In 1957 he worked on Stanley Kubrick's Paths of Glory.

== Selected filmography ==
- Heads Up, Charley (1927)
- The Four from Bob 13 (1932)
- Cavaliers of the Kurfürstendamm (1932)
- Ways to a Good Marriage (1933)
- The Two Seals (1934)
- All Because of the Dog (1935)
- Every Day Isn't Sunday (1935)
- His Late Excellency (1935)
- A Doctor of Conviction (1936)
- Port Arthur (1936)
- Port Arthur (1936)
- Adventure in Warsaw (1937)
- The Beaver Coat (1937)
- The Ways of Love Are Strange (1937)
- The Stars Shine (1938)
- Secret Code LB 17 (1938)
- Revolutionary Wedding (1938)
- Two Women (1938)
- Adventure in Love (1938)
- D III 88 (1939)
- Battle Squadron Lützow (1941)
- Diesel (1942)
- The Green Salon (1944)
- The Enchanted Day (1944)
- Music in Salzburg (1944)
- The Berliner (1948)
- Crown Jewels (1950)
- When the Evening Bells Ring (1951)
- Monks, Girls and Hungarian Soldiers (1952)
- Man on a Tightrope (1953)
- We'll Talk About Love Later (1953)
- The Night Without Morals (1953)
- I'll See You at Lake Constance (1956)
- Paths of Glory (1957)
- The Devil Strikes at Night (1957)
- The Doctor of Stalingrad (1958)
- Taiga (1958)
- Dorothea Angermann (1959)
- The Head (1959)
- Island of the Amazons (1960)
- Melody of Hate (1962)
- Escape from East Berlin (1962)
- Encounter in Salzburg (1964)

== Bibliography ==
- Bergfelder, Tim. International Adventures: German Popular Cinema and European Co-Productions in the 1960s. Berhahn Books, 2005.
