= Wolf C. Hartwig =

German film producer

Wolf C. Hartwig (8 September 1919, Düsseldorf, Germany – 18 December 2017, Paris, France) sometimes credited as Wolfgang C. Hartwig and Wolfgang Hartwig, was a German film producer working in exploitation genres.

== Career ==
After acting as a film distributor, Hartwig's first film as a producer was the then controversial documentary Bis fünf nach zwölf – Adolf Hitler und das 3. Reich (1953). Seeing the value of notorious publicity, Hartwig began producing a series of exploitation films called "Sittenfilme" or "vice films" for his film production company Rapid Film. His first 15 films from 1957 to 1962 were economically based on original screenplays and did not use a major distributor.

Hartwig began the next phase of his career in 1962 with The Hot Port of Hong Kong. Hartwig not only found it cheaper to film in Near Eastern and Oriental locations but his films received international co-production funding from other European nations. His films were released by two major German film companies Gloria Film and Constantin Film, who were attracted by Hartwig's subjects of adventure, Eurospy films and works by popular German authors such as a film based on the adventures of the pre-World War II pulp fiction hero Rolf Torring that was reprinted in paperback after the war, and Westerns based on the works of Friedrich Gerstäcker.

In the late 1960s Hartwig moved to sex films such as the Schulmädchen-Report film series that initiated the Sex report film genre.

In 1977 Hartwig decided to film a large budget World War II film shot in Yugoslavia from the German point of view and engaged Sam Peckinpah to direct Cross of Iron. The film lead to a sequel Breakthrough (1979) directed by Andrew V. MacLaglen. His last film was Palace directed by Édouard Molinaro.

During the 1960s he was married to the actress Dorothee Parker who appeared in several of his films.

== Selected filmography ==
=== Producer ===
- Bis fünf nach zwölf – Adolf Hitler und das 3. Reich (1953)
- All the Sins of the Earth (1958)
- Sin Began with Eve (1958), released in the US in 1962 with additional footage under the title The Bellboy and the Playgirls
- Your Body Belongs to Me (1959)
- Final Destination: Red Lantern (1960)
- Satan Tempts with Love (1960)
- Horrors of Spider Island (1960)
- Island of the Amazons (1960)
- Melody of Hate (1962)
- The Hot Port of Hong Kong (1962)
- Between Shanghai and St. Pauli (1962)
- The Pirates of the Mississippi (1963)
- Mission to Hell (1964)
- Mystery of the Red Jungle (1964)
- Coffin from Hong Kong (1964)
- The Secret of the Chinese Carnation (1964)
- Massacre at Marble City (1964)
- Black Eagle of Santa Fe (1965)
- Mutiny in the South Seas (1965)
- 13 Days to Die (1965)
- Target for Killing (1966)
- Agent 505: Death Trap in Beirut (1966)
- Countdown to Doomsday (1966)
- A Handful of Heroes (1967)
- Lotus Flowers for Miss Quon (1967)
- Emma Hamilton (1968)
- Madame and Her Niece (1969)
- The Young Tigers of Hong Kong (1969)
- Moonlighting Mistress (1970)
- Schulmädchen-Report (1970)
- Holiday Report (1971)
- Office Girls (1971)
- Nurse Report (1972)
- The Girl from Hong Kong (1973)
- No Gold for a Dead Diver (1974)
- Cross of Iron (1977)
- Bloody Moon (1981)
- No Time to Die (1984)

=== Actor ===
- The Pirates of the Mississippi (1963) - Soldier (uncredited)
- Mutiny in the South Seas (1965) - Captain Lieutenant Krüger
- Schulmädchen-Report (1973, part 5) - Zuschauer im Gerichtsaal hinter Willy Harlander (uncredited)
- Cross of Iron (1977) - Hartwig (uncredited) (final film role)
