= Gert Günther Hoffmann =

German actor (1929–1997)

- Born: 21 February 1929; Lankwitz, Steglitz-Zehlendorf, Berlin, Germany
- Died: 17 November 1997 (aged 68); Feldafing, Bavaria, Germany
- Occupations: Actor; Director
- Years active: 1952-1997

Gert Günther Hoffmann (21 February 1929 – 17 November 1997) was a German actor and director. He achieved fame in German film and television as a voice actor in dubbing.

He was the German voice of Sean Connery in most Connery movies, as well as of Paul Newman, William Shatner in Star Trek (both TOS and most of the theatrical films) and Patrick Macnee in The Avengers for German TV.

== Partial filmography ==
- The Falling Star (1950) - von Aster (voice, uncredited)
- The Smugglers' Banquet (1952)
- The Perfect Couple (1954) - Klaus Peter Hörrmann
- Love Without Illusions (1955) - Fritz
- The Day the Rains Came (1959) - Willi
- Burning Sands (1960) - Rosen
- Ordered to Love (1961) - Oberleutnant Mertens
- Café Oriental (1962) - Michael (voice, uncredited)
- The Invisible Dr. Mabuse (1962) - FBI Agent Joe Como (voice, uncredited)
- Her Most Beautiful Day (1962) - Erich Seidel
- Breakfast in Bed (1963) - Victor H. Armstrong (voice, uncredited)
- Apache Gold (1963) - Old Shatterhand (voice, uncredited)
- Hafenpolizei (1964, TV Series) - Staffler
- Goldfinger (1964) - James Bond (German version)
- The Desperado Trail (1965) - Old Shatterhand (voice, uncredited)
- Manhattan Night of Murder (1965) - Eriksen (voice, uncredited)
- Um Null Uhr schnappt die Falle zu (1966) - Lew Hutton
- Kiss Kiss, Kill Kill (1966) - Jo Louis Walker / 'Kommissar X' (voice, uncredited)
- Kommissar X – Drei gelbe Katzen (1966) - Jo Louis Walker / 'Kommissar X' (voice, uncredited)
- Kommissar X – In den Klauen des goldenen Drachen (1966) - Jo Louis Walker / 'Kommissar X' (voice, uncredited)
- Winnetou and the Crossbreed (1966) - Old Shatterhand (voice, uncredited)
- Die Rechnung – eiskalt serviert (1966) - George Davis (voice, uncredited)
- Death Trip (1967) - Jo Louis Walker / 'Kommissar X' (voice, uncredited)
- Mister Dynamit - Morgen küßt euch der Tod (1967) - Bob Urban / Mr. Dynamit (voice, uncredited)
- Kommissar X - Drei blaue Panther (1968) - Jo Louis Walker / 'Kommissar X' (voice, uncredited)
- The Long Day of Inspector Blomfield (1968) - Mac O'Hara
- Radhapura - Endstation der Verdammten (1968) - Steve (German version, voice, uncredited)
- Die fünfte Kolonne (1968, TV Series) - Renzyk
- The Valley of Death (1968) - Old Shatterhand (voice, uncredited)
- Dead Body on Broadway (1969) - Jerry Cotton (voice, uncredited)
- Rote Lippen, Sadisterotica (1969) - Mr. Radeck (voice, uncredited)
- Kommissar X – Drei goldene Schlangen (1969) - Jo Louis Walker / 'Kommissar X' (voice, uncredited)
- Hänsel und Gretel verliefen sich im Wald (1970) - Narrator (voice, uncredited)
- Der Kommissar (1970, TV Series) - Leppich
- Sonderdezernat K1 (1972–1982, TV Series) - Kriminalobermeister Arnold Matofski
- Lokaltermin: Die schwarze Hand (1973, TV Series) - Prosecutor
- Zu Gast Bei Paulchens Trickverwandten ( 1973, cartoon series) - Narrator
- Dschungelmädchen für zwei Halunken (1974) - Jim (voice)
- No Gold for a Dead Diver (1974) - Erzähler (voice, uncredited)
- Strongman Ferdinand (1976) - Wilutzki
- Derrick (1984, TV Series) - Kommissar Wobeck
- The Old Fox (1985, TV Series) - Dr. Hans Leonhard

=== Dubbing ===
- No Love for Johnnie (1961) – Sydney Johnson
- Frankenstein: The True Story (1973) – Dr. John Polidori
