= Arnold Marquis =

German voice actor (1921–1990)

Heinz Arnold Marquis (6 April 1921 – 24 November 1990) was a German voice actor. He was one of the best known and most frequently used dubbing voices of Germany, known especially as the voice of "tough guys" like John Wayne, Charles Bronson or Lee Marvin.

== Early life ==
Arnold Marquis was born in Dortmund, the son of banker Paul Marquis and his wife Anneliese (née Becker). He was brought in contact with theatre by the head of the Bochum Schauspielhaus (theatre) Saladin Schmitt who also gave him his first acting job in 1939. Shortly thereafter Marquis was drafted into the Wehrmacht and wounded several times during World War II. Returning to Germany, he moved to Berlin. After some acting jobs, he was contacted by a representative of the Rank Organisation who was looking for a dubbing voice for Stewart Granger. His sonorous voice impressed the British film executives and in 1946 he received his first voice-acting assignment for Madonna of the Seven Moons (1945).

== Career ==
Although he appeared in a number of film and TV productions over the decades, beginning in 1948 and ending in 1989 (Otto: The Alien from East Frisia), he never succeeded in establishing a "normal" acting career for himself. He was, however, the best-paid German voice actor, receiving daily wages of around DM 1,000. Among those actors he dubbed for the German version were Robert Mitchum, Kirk Douglas, Yves Montand, Richard Widmark, James Coburn, Charles Bronson, George C. Scott, Lino Ventura, Trevor Howard, Bud Spencer, Jack Klugman, and Lee Marvin. To German viewers, his distinctive gravelly voice became closely associated with many of these international film stars. This effect was most pronounced in the case of John Wayne, who reportedly personally selected Marquis as his voice-actor. After Wayne's death in 1979, Marquis published a music single "John Wayne, der Held" (also known as "Ich war die Stimme von John Wayne").

Marquis has been described as the "King of Dubbing Artists" (König der Synchronsprecher), and he was one of the most-used voice-artists ever, having accumulated over a thousand credits to his name. He did not like the label Synchronsprecher (speaker), preferring Synchron-Schauspieler (actor) instead.

He also appeared on stage at Berlin Boulevard theatres and his voice appeared in cigarette commercials for a brand that was using a Western theme for its advertising. According to his obituary in Der Spiegel: "As he grew older, he became ever more like his alter ego, John Wayne."

== Personal ==
He was married three times and had a daughter called Gwendolyn. Marquis had problems with alcoholism and had to go through rehab. After smoking 80 cigarettes a day for decades, he died of lung cancer on 24 November 1990 in Berlin.

== Filmography ==
Year	Title	Role	Notes
1948	Und wieder 48	Hinzdorf	
1949	Quartet of Five	Toni Zieseler	
1953	Brüderchen und Schwesterchen	König	
1959	The Black Chapel	Graf Emanuele Rossi	Voice, Uncredited
1963	Apache Gold	Bill Jones	Voice, Uncredited
1964	The Secret of Dr. Mabuse	Adm. Quency	Voice, Uncredited
1964	Among Vultures	Martin Bauman Sr.	Voice, Uncredited
1965	The Oil Prince	Campbell	Voice, Uncredited
1965	The Desperado Trail	Rollins	Voice, Uncredited
1966	Kommissar X – Drei gelbe Katzen	Philip Dawson	Voice, Uncredited
1966	The Strangler of the Tower	Inspektor Harvey	Voice, Uncredited
1966	Kommissar X – In den Klauen des goldenen Drachen	Li Hu Wang	Voice, Uncredited
1966	Winnetou and the Crossbreed	Mac Haller	Voice, Uncredited
1968	Radhapura - Endstation der Verdammten	Alfredo	German version, Voice, Uncredited
1968	Eve		
1969	Kommissar X – Drei goldene Schlangen	Armand Landru	Voice, Uncredited
1970	Deadlock	Sunshine	Voice, Uncredited
1971	Der lüsterne Türke	Sultan	
1971	X312 - Flight to Hell	Bill - Steward / Paco	Voice, Uncredited
1972	The Stuff That Dreams Are Made Of	Taxifahrer Fedor Georgi Iwanow	
1972	Dr. M schlägt zu	Melou	Voice, Uncredited
1973	Once Upon a Time	Herr Pulle	Voice
1976	Everyone Dies Alone	Vorarbeiter Dolenz	
1976	Mr. Rossi Looks for Happiness	Boss	German version, Voice, Uncredited
1976	Verlorenes Leben		
1976	Albino	Johannes	Voice, Uncredited
1976	Jack the Ripper	Blind Man	Voice, Uncredited
1979	Breakthrough	Col. Rogers	German version, Voice, Uncredited
1982	Kamikaze 1989	Polizeipräsident	
1982	Dance of the Cookoos	God	German version, Voice, Uncredited
1983	Das Wagnis des Arnold Janssen	Joh. Augustinus Paredis - Bischof von Roermond	
1984	Code Name: Wild Geese	Fletcher	German version, Voice, Uncredited
1988	Stowaways on the Ark	Noah	Voice
1989	Otto: The Alien from East Frisia	Baron von Platt	
