= Siegfried Rauch =

German film and television actor

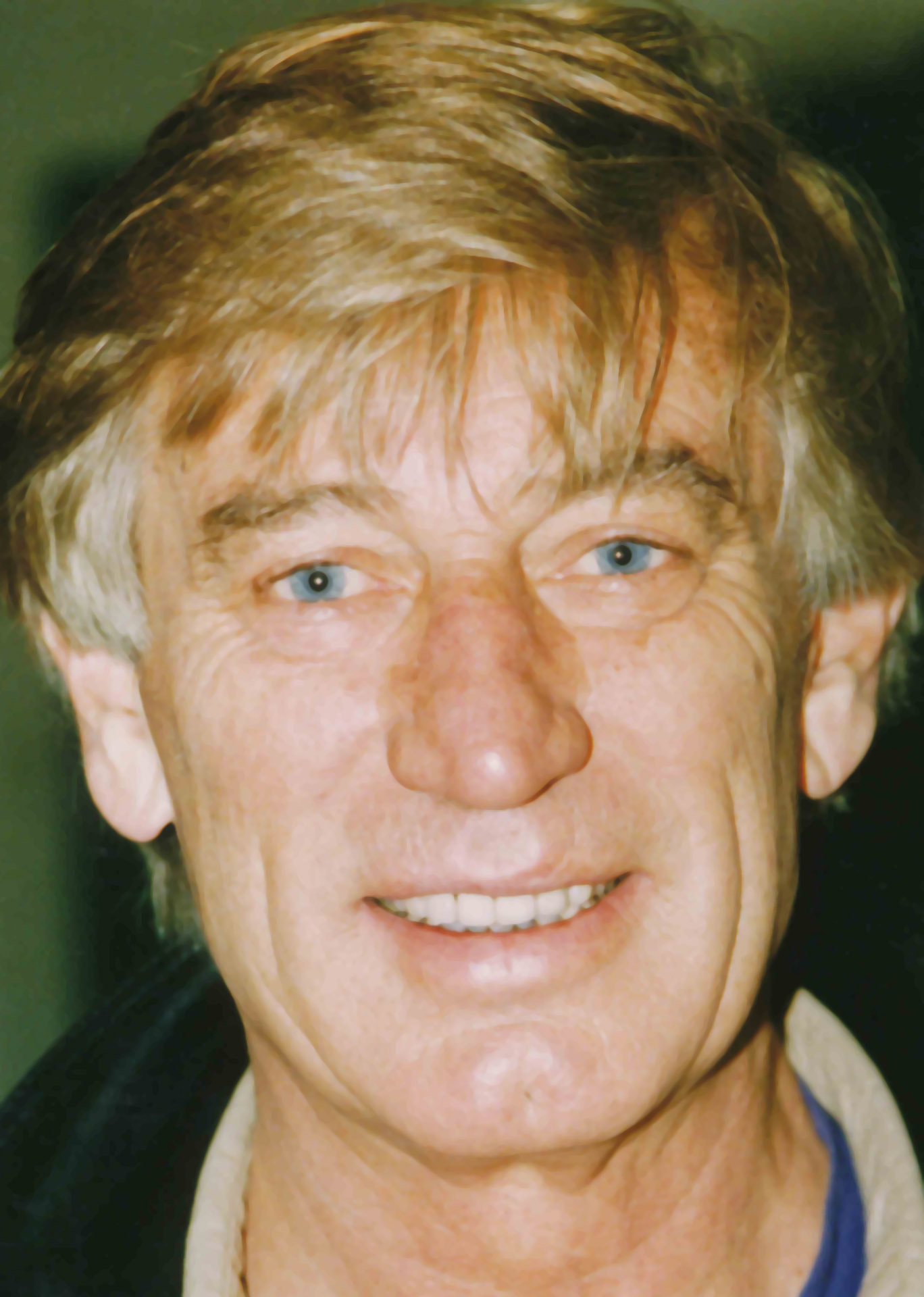
- Born: 2 April 1932; Landsberg am Lech, Bavaria, German Reich
- Died: 11 March 2018 (aged 85); Obersöchering, Bavaria, Germany
- Occupation: Actor
- Years active: 1958–2018
- Spouse: Karin Rauch (m. 1964)

Signature
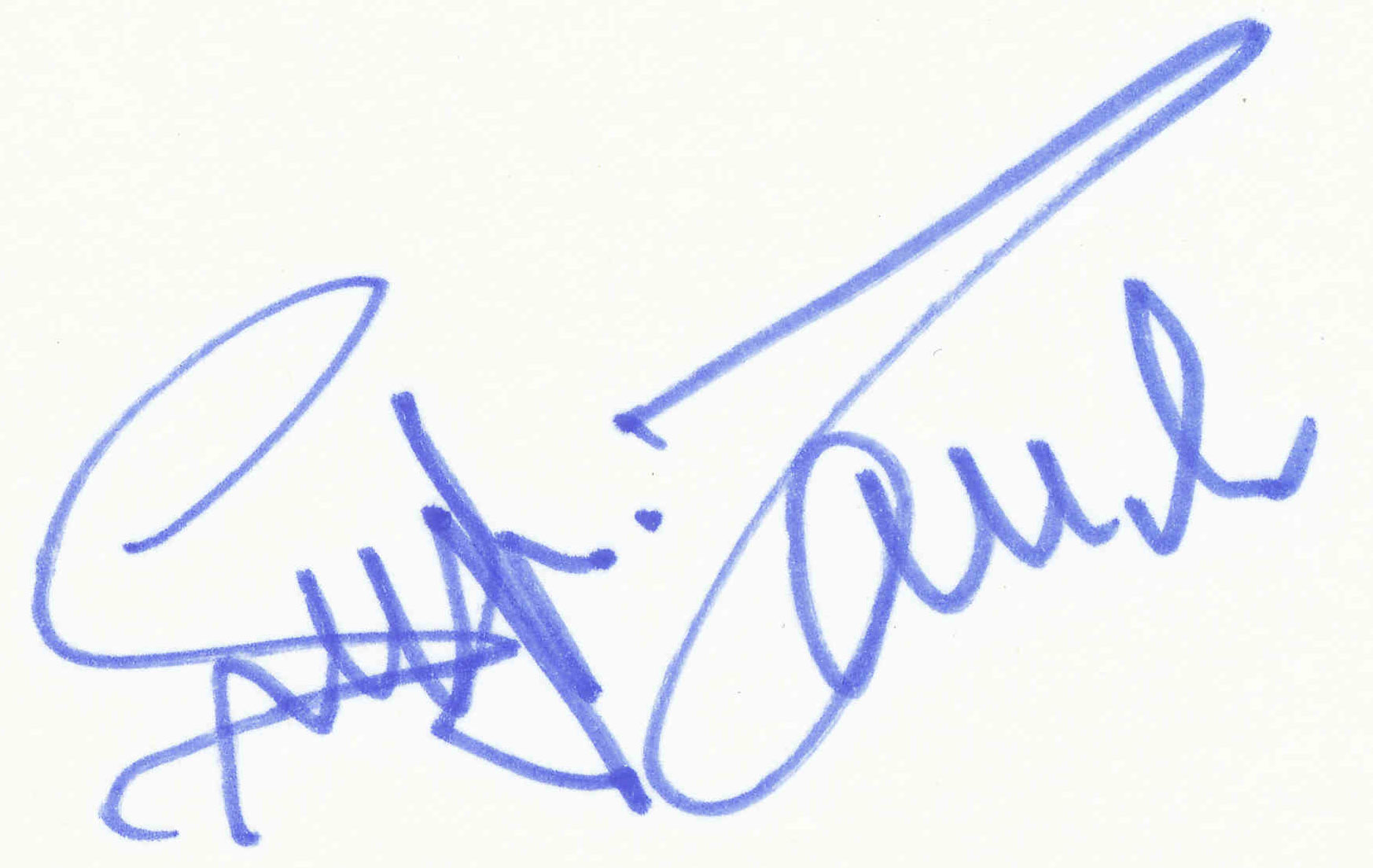

Siegfried Rauch (2 April 1932 – 11 March 2018) was a German film and television actor. In a career spanning over 60 years, he appeared in several international film productions and had leading roles in numerous German television productions.

== Career ==
Siegfried Rauch was born in Landsberg am Lech, Upper Bavaria. He studied drama at the Ludwig-Maximilians-Universität München and also attended private drama lessons. He began performing in theatres in 1958, beginning with Bremen (until 1962), and followed by Berlin, Munich and Hamburg.

In the 1970s, Rauch appeared in the 1970 Hollywood film Patton as Captain Steiger, who is given the responsibility of researching Patton in order to predict his strategy. In Le Mans (1971), Rauch played the race driver Erich Stahler who is Steve McQueen's rival. In Samuel Fuller's The Big Red One, Rauch played a German army sergeant, the counterpart of Lee Marvin's character, who experiences the same events as Marvin only from a German perspective. Other Hollywood productions in which Rauch appeared were The Eagle Has Landed (1976) and Escape to Athena (1979).

His most famous leading role on 1970s German television was Thomas Lieven in Es muss nicht immer Kaviar sein (It Can't Always Be Caviar), based on the spy novel by Johannes Mario Simmel. His various other roles on television propelled his career as an actor in Germany.

From 1999 to 2013 Rauch had one of the leading roles as the captain on Das Traumschiff, one of the most-watched television series in Germany. In this role he was preceded by Heinz Weiss and succeeded by Sascha Hehn. He also appeared regularly in other German TV productions, including Der Bergdoktor, and remained active until his death.

== Personal life ==
Siegfried Rauch, also known as "Sigi", lived in Obersöchering near Weilheim in southern Upper Bavaria. Rauch married Karin in 1964, and they had two sons together. Steve McQueen was the godfather of his son Jakob.

Rauch died on 11 March 2018 from sudden heart failure which caused him to fall down stairs at the village fire station near his home. He was 85 years old.

== Selected filmography ==
- The Vulture Wally (1956) .... Leander
- The Hunter of Fall (1956) .... Toni, Wilderer
- Kommissar X – Drei gelbe Katzen (1966) .... Nitro
- The Saint Lies in Wait (1966) .... Johnny K.W. Mest (uncredited)
- Spy Today, Die Tomorrow (1967) .... Tazzio
- The College Girl Murders (1967) .... Frank Keeney
- Kommissar X – Drei blaue Panther (1968) .... Anthony
- The Zombie Walks (1968) .... Dr. Brand
- Peter und Sabine (1968) .... Dr. Petter, Klassenlehrer
- Ein dreifach Hoch dem Sanitätsgefreiten Neumann (1968) .... Sanitätsgefreiter Neumann
- Patton (1970) .... Capt. Oskar Steiger
- Seventeen and Anxious (1970) .... Chauffeur
- Nous n'irons plus au bois (1970) .... Werner
- Angels with Burnt Wings (1970) .... 1. Kommissar
- Le Mans (1971) .... Erich Stahler
- Not Dumb, The Bird (1972) .... Friend of Jacques
- Little Mother (1973) .... Colonel Pinares
- The Hunter of Fall (1974) .... Huisen-Toni
- Zwei himmlische Dickschädel (1974) .... Lenz
- Stolen Heaven (1974) .... Jungpfarrer Franz Gruber
- The Eagle Has Landed (1976) .... Sgt. Brandt
- It Can't Always Be Caviar (TV miniseries, 1977) .... Thomas Lieven
- The Standard (1977) .... Graf Bottenlauben
- Waldrausch (1977) .... Krispin
- The Uranium Conspiracy (1978) .... The Baron
- Escape to Athena (1979) .... Lt. Braun
- Flashpoint Africa (1980) .... Joe
- The Big Red One (1980) .... Sgt. Schroeder
- Mein Freund Winnetou (1980, TV miniseries) .... Old Shatterhand
- Contamination (1980) .... Hamilton
- Popcorn & Paprika (1984) .... Sigi
- No One Cries Forever (1984) .... Hans van Wielligh
- Das Traumschiff (1986, 1997, 1999–2014, TV series) ... Kapitän Paulsen
- Death Stone (1987) .... Hemingway
- Fire, Ice and Dynamite (1990) .... Larry
- Wildbach (1993–1997, TV series) ... Martin Kramer
- Sons of Trinity (1995) .... Parker
- Geregelte Verhältnisse (2001) .... Anton Fenzl
- The Vulture Wally (2005) .... Franz Flender
- Kreuzfahrt ins Glück (2007–2013, TV series) ... Kapitän Paulsen
- Der Bergdoktor (2008–2018, TV series) .... Dr. Roman Melchinger (final appearance)
