= Gisela Hahn =

German actress

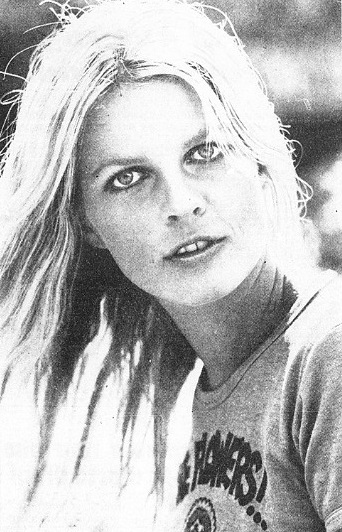
- Born: 13 May 1943 (age 83); Briesen, German Nazi occupied Poland (now Wąbrzeźno, Poland)
- Occupation: Actress
- Years active: 1964–present

Gisela Hahn (born Gisela Drenkhan; 13 May 1943) is a German film actress. She has appeared in more than 40 films since 1964. She was born in the city of Wąbrzeźno (Briesen in German) during the German occupation of World War II, therefore, she has German citizenship.

== Selected filmography ==
- The Merry Wives of Tyrol (1964) - Reni
- In Bed by Eight (1965) - Schülerin
- DM-Killer (1965) - Püppi
- Neues vom Hexer (1965) - Susan Copperfield
- Who Wants to Sleep? (1965)
- Kommissar X – In den Klauen des goldenen Drachen (1966) - Stella
- Spy Today, Die Tomorrow (1967) - Meisje
- The Sweet Time of Kalimagdora (1968) - Marta
- Revenge (1969) - Milly
- La servante (1970) - Karin
- They Call Me Trinity (1970) - Sarah
- Gradiva (1970)
- Arriva Durango... paga o muori (1971) - Margot
- Tiger Gang (1971) - Jacky Clay
- Quando gli uomini armarono la clava e... con le donne fecero din don (1971) - Sissi
- Long Live Your Death (1971) - Orlowsky's Wife
- Zambo, il dominatore della foresta (1972) - Grace Woodworth
- César and Rosalie (1972) - Carla
- Incensurato provata disonestà carriera assicurata cercasi (1972) - Moglie di zaccherin
- Emil and the Piglet (1973) - Lärarinnan
- Es knallt - und die Engel singen (1974) - Jennifer Adam
- Commissariato di notturna (1974) - The German Girl
- Julia (1974) - Myriam
- White Fang to the Rescue (1974) - Katie
- Chi ha rubato il tesoro dello scia? (1974)
- Substitute Teacher (1975) - Gym Teacher
- Victory March (1976)
- The Loves and Times of Scaramouche (1976) - Babette
- A Common Sense of Modesty (1976) - Ursula Kerr
- Le seminariste (1976) - Annalisa - the au-pair Girl
- Mister Scarface (1976) - Clara
- Battaglie negli spazi stellari (1978) - Dr. Helen Parker
- Ernesto (1979) - Mother of Ilio and Rachele (uncredited)
- Disco Fieber (1979)
- White Pop Jesus (1980) - Stella Young
- Palermo or Wolfsburg (1980) - Brigittes Mutter
- Contamination (1980) - Perla de la Cruz
- El caníbal (1980) - Jane
- Forest of Love (1981)
- Banana Joe (1982) - Woman in Perfume Advertisement
- Deadly Game (1982) - Angela
- Gridlocked (2024) - Marlene
