= Marilyn J. Ziffrin =

American classical composer

Marilyn Jane Ziffrin (August 7, 1926 – March 16, 2018) was an American composer, music educator, author, and musician.

== Biography ==
=== Early life and education ===
Marilyn Ziffrin was born in Moline, Illinois, to parents Betty S. and Harry B. Ziffrin, (both children of Russian immigrants who emigrated from Belogorodka, Ukraine, due to growing anti-semitism). Harry, who grew up in the then Tri-Cities of Moline, Rock Island, Illinois, and Davenport, Iowa, and Betty, who grew up in St. Louis, were first cousins; their fathers were brothers. They both were first cousins of Lester Ziffren, the famous journalist, and Paul Ziffren, the Democratic Party leader from Los Angeles. Harry Ziffrin owned a liquor distributorship in Moline, but every member of the Ziffrin immediate family played a musical instrument.

Marilyn and her two brothers, Norman and James, were all required by their parents to take three years of piano lessons as part of their education, so Marilyn began studying piano at age four. Her first teacher was Louise Cervin, who studied with Theodor Leschetizky. After her very first piano lesson, Ziffrin knew she wanted to be a musician. Ziffrin also studied clarinet and saxophone, and soon began composing with a piano piece called "Ode to a Lost Pencil."

Ziffrin was educated in the Moline public school system, and organized a band while she was in middle school. She graduated as the valedictorian of her high school class, then attended the University of Wisconsin-Madison for her undergraduate degree. She double majored in instrumental music education and applied music, and graduated cum laude with a Bachelor of Music in 1948. Ziffrin received a Master of Arts degree from Columbia University in 1949. It was during this time she started composing more seriously. She composed a piano concerto, her first large-scale work, which caught the attention of her music history professor, Howard Murphy. Murphy encouraged Ziffrin to keep composing and to join the National Association of Composers and Conductors.

After graduating from Columbia, Ziffrin took private composition lessons with Alexander Tcherepnin, who encouraged her to apply for a residency at MacDowell so she could focus on writing music. She was accepted, and spent the summer of 1961 at the prestigious artists' retreat. "It was the first time people looked at me as a composer, so I began to identify myself as a composer."

Ziffrin was able to spend so much time composing because of an anonymous patron who funded her during the 1970s and 1980s. This donor allowed Ziffrin to stay for one month each year, all expenses paid, at their ranch in California, which Ziffrin called "MacDowell West."

=== Professional career ===
From 1967 to 1982, Ziffrin worked as an associate professor of music at New England College in Henniker, New Hampshire, where she had moved after her time at MacDowell in the hopes she would be closer to Boston and New York City. She also taught private composition lessons at St. Paul's School in Concord, New Hampshire, from 1972 to 1983. While at St. Paul's, one of Ziffrin's compositions students was Augusta Read Thomas, a renowned composer, who remembers Ziffrin as a role model and "an impressive teacher and musician."

==== Gender discrimination ====
Ziffrin encountered discrimination on account of her gender several times during her career. When she graduated from Columbia, a job placement agent told her, "..as long as he was alive, she or any other woman would never be placed as a conductor." In another incident, Ziffrin sent several of her pieces to a music director in New York City, who remarked, "What strong music from such a little girl."

==== Achievements ====
Ziffrin was a member of the National Association of Composers and Conductors. She received awards, including ASCAP Awards and Honorable Mention in the Music Teachers National Association Shepherd Competition in 1998. She was named New Hampshire Music Teachers Association Composer of the year in 1997, and has received six residencies at the MacDowell Colony.

She was also the author of Carl Ruggles: Composer, Painter, and Storyteller (Urbana: University of Illinois Press, 1994).

=== Music and compositional philosophy ===
Ziffrin's music was influenced by the works of major European composers like Ludwig van Beethoven, Joseph Haydn, Béla Bartók, Igor Stravinsky, and Johann Sebastian Bach. She was also inspired by jazz, Jewish and synagogue music, and Broadway musicals. Ziffrin composed many pieces in a wide variety of genres, including opera, film scores, wind ensemble, orchestra, and choral music as well as chamber and solo works. Most works were commissioned or written for specific performers. They are assimilated to form quite different and distinctive sounds depending on the composition. According to Ziffrin, "While my style continues to change, it is probably best described as eclectic. I choose to believe it is essentially expressive, optimistic, and adventurous."

== Selected works ==
Ziffrin wrote compositions for solo instruments, chamber music, choral works, works for orchestra and band.

- Cantata for Freedom
- For Love of Cynthia
- Two Songs for bass-baritone
- Piano Sonata
- Fantasy for 2 pianos
- New England Epitaphs
- Music for handbells and organ
- Two Holiday Songs
- Yankee Hooray
- Concerto for viola and woodwind quintet (1977–1978)
- Haiku, Song Cycle for soprano, viola and harpsichord (or piano) (1971); words by Kathryn Martin
- Sonata for Organ and Cello (1973); Commissioned by Colby-Sawyer College for Harriette Slack Richardson
- Tributum for clarinet, viola and double bass (1992)
