= Super Bug =

Super Bug or Superbug may refer to:

- Superbug, an antimicrobial- or antibiotic-resistant microorganism
- Super Bug (video game), a 1977 arcade game featuring a Volkswagen Beetle
- Superbug (film series), a West German film series about a Volkswagen Beetle
- Volkswagen Super Bug, a nickname for the 1302/Super and 1303 models of the Volkswagen Beetle car
- Year 2038 problem, a time formatting bug in computer systems also known as the Y2K38 Superbug.
- "Superbug", a song by King Gizzard & The Lizard Wizard from the album Infest the Rats' Nest.

== See also ==
- Boeing F/A-18E/F Super Hornet
