= Rudolf Zehetgruber =

Austrian film director (1926–2023)

- Born: 16 September 1926; Vienna, Austria
- Died: 2 July 2023 (aged 96)
- Occupations: Film director film producer screenwriter actor
- Years active: 1953–1985
- Spouse: Barbara Kathrin Zehetgruber

Rudolf Zehetgruber (16 September 1926 – 2 July 2023) was an Austrian film director and producer, screenwriter and actor who directed 17 films between 1960 and 1985. He was most known for writing and directing the yellow Volkswagen beetle Superbug "Dudu" comedy film series that also featured his wife, acting under the pseudonym Kathrin Oginski. He also directed, wrote and acted in two entries of the Kommissar X film series.

Zehetgruber, who acted under pseudonyms like Rolf Gruber, Richard Lynn, David Mark, Robert Mark, Rudolf Rittberg and Rolf Zehett, died on 2 July 2023, at the age of 96.

Rolf Zehetbauer (1929–2022) was an unrelated contemporary German production designer that won an Academy Award in the category Best Art Direction for the film Cabaret.

== Selected filmography ==
- The Congress Dances (directed by Franz Antel, 1955)
- The Bashful Elephant (1961)
- The Black Cobra (1963)
- The Nylon Noose (1963)
- Piccadilly Zero Hour 12 (1963)
- The Inn on Dartmoor (1964)
- The Secret of the Chinese Carnation (1964)
- Girls Behind Bars (1965)
- Seven Vengeful Women (1966)
- Kommissar X: Three Yellow Cats (Death is Nimble, Death is Quick, 1966)
- Kommissar X – Drei grüne Hunde (1967)
- The Long Day of Inspector Blomfield (1968)
- The Love Bug Rally (the first Superbug film, 1971)
- Superbug, Super Agent (1972)
- The Superbug on Extratour (1973)
- The Maddest Car in the World (1975)
- Son of Superbug (1979)
- Nessie – das verrückteste Monster der Welt (1985)
