= Helga Liné =

Spanish actress (b. 1932)

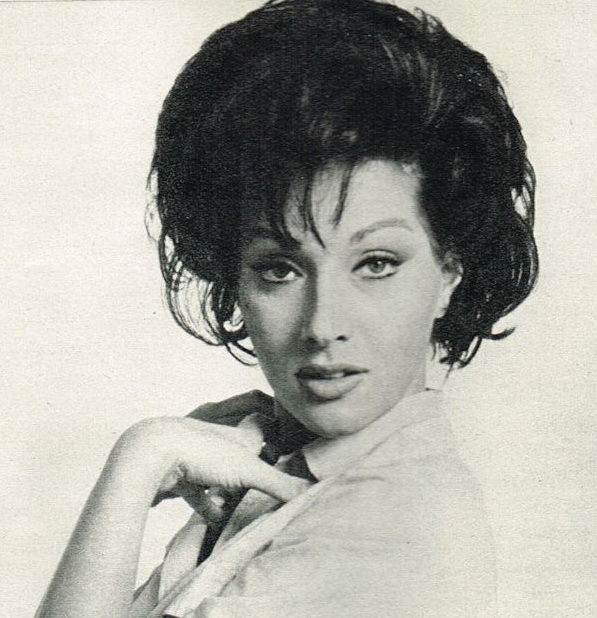
- Helga Liné in 1965
- Born: Helga Lina Stern; 14 July 1932 (age 93); Berlin, Germany
- Citizenship: Spain
- Occupations: Actor, circus acrobat

Helga Lina Stern (born 14 July 1932), known as Helga Liné (pronounced [liˈne]), is a German-born Spanish film actress, model, and former vedette. She was a star of the horror genre during the 1960s and 1970s, and gained the reputation of a scream queen.

== Early life ==
Liné was born Helga Lina Stern on 14 July 1932 in Berlin, into a circus family. When she was still very young, her family emigrated to Portugal to escape the Nazi regime. She began her performing arts career at the age of 8 in her family's circus acts, as an acrobat and contortionist.

== Career ==
After winning a beauty contest, Liné made her film debut at the age of 13 in the Spanish-Portuguese co-production La mantilla de Beatriz (1946). As a young adult she worked professionally as a model, showgirl, and vedette, working variously in Portugal, Spain, and Brazil.

In the 1950s she made further film appearances, but her career took off after she moved to Madrid in 1960. From this point, the red-headed actress made many appearances in the 1960s, particularly in horror and action films. She also starred in the spaghetti westerns In a Colt's Shadow (1965) and Have a Good Funeral, My Friend... Sartana Will Pay (1970). Although she appeared in giallo films such as So Sweet... So Perverse (1969), My Dear Killer (1972), Alta tensión (1972) and Red Rings of Fear (1978), she is best known for her horror film work. She appeared opposite Barbara Steele in Nightmare Castle (1965), and then starred as the spy Natasha in the Gothic feature Horror Express (1972), in the title role in The Loreley's Grasp, a.k.a. When the Screaming Stops (1973), as a vampire countess in the erotic film The Vampires Night Orgy (1973), and as the leader of a Satanic cult in Black Candles (1982). She also starred opposite Spanish horror actor Paul Naschy in Horror Rises from the Tomb and The Mummy's Revenge in 1973, and appeared in the 1974 Peter Fonda film Open Season.

Later she would go on to work under Pedro Almodóvar in films such as Labyrinth of Passion in 1982 and Law of Desire in 1986. She also took part in the popular Spanish TV series Verano azul in the early eighties, as a secondary character.

== Selected filmography ==
- Kill or Be Killed (1950)
- La trinca del aire (1951)
- The Great Galeoto (1951)
- The Twin Girls (1963)
- Rocío from La Mancha (1963)
- The Blancheville Monster (1963)
- Triumph of the Ten Gladiators (1964)
- Gladiators Seven (1964)
- Hercules and the Tyrants of Babylon (1964)
- Goliath at the Conquest of Damascus (1965)
- Nightmare Castle (1965)
- Agent 077: Mission Bloody Mary (1965)
- In a Colt's Shadow (1965)
- The Murderer with the Silk Scarf (1966)
- Weekend, Italian Style (1966)
- Special Mission Lady Chaplin (1966)
- Kriminal (1966)
- Password: Kill Agent Gordon (1966)
- Avenger X (1967)
- Il marchio di Kriminal (1967)
- Brutti di notte (1968)
- So Sweet... So Perverse (1969)
- Churchill's Leopards (1970)
- Have a Good Funeral, My Friend... Sartana Will Pay (1970)
- The Beasts (1971)
- Alta tensión (1972)
- My Dear Killer (1972)
- Horror Express (1972)
- Holy God, Here Comes the Passatore! (1973)
- Those Dirty Dogs (1973)
- Horror Rises from the Tomb (1973)
- War Goddess (1973)
- The Mummy's Revenge (1973)
- No es bueno que el hombre esté solo (1973) as Mónica
- The Loreley's Grasp (1973)
- The Vampires Night Orgy (1973)
- Dick Turpin (1974)
- Open Season (1974)
- Death Will Have Your Eyes (1974)
- Death's Newlyweds (1975)
- The More It Goes, the Less It Goes (1977)
- China 9, Liberty 37 (1978)
- Red Rings of Fear (1978)
- Father Cami's Wedding (1979)
- Stigma (1980)
- Madame Olga's Pupils (1981)
- Black Candles (1982)
- Labyrinth of Passion (1982)
- Black Venus (1983)
- The Cheerful Colsada Girls (1984)
- Pulsebeat (1985)
- Law of Desire (1986)
