= Antdorf =

- Municipality
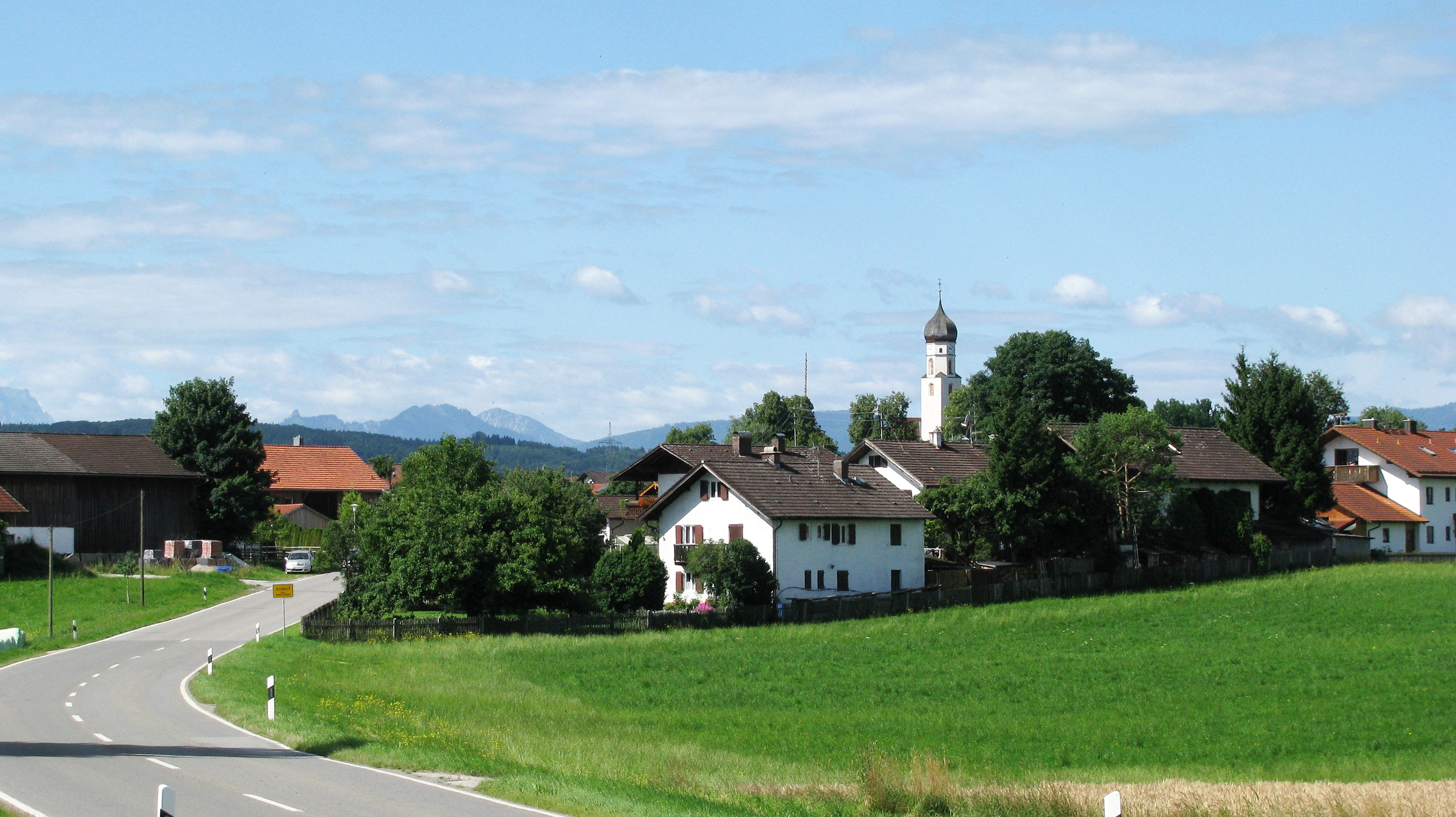
- Antdorf seen from the northeast

- Coat of arms

- Location of Antdorf within Weilheim-Schongau district
- Interactive map of Antdorf
- Location within Germany Location within Bavaria
- Coordinates: 47°45′N 11°18′E
- Country: Germany
- State: Bavaria
- Admin. region: Oberbayern
- District: Weilheim-Schongau
- Municipal assoc.: Habach

Government
  - Mayor (2020–26): Klaus Kostalek

Area
  - Total: 22.38 km^{2} (8.64 sq mi)
- Elevation: 631 m (2,070 ft)

Population (2025-12-31)
  - Total: 1,352
  - Density: 60.41/km^{2} (156.5/sq mi)
- Time zone: UTC+01:00 (CET)
  - Summer (DST): UTC+02:00 (CEST)
- Postal codes: 82387
- Dialling codes: 08856
- Vehicle registration: WM
- Website: www.antdorf.de

Antdorf (German pronunciation: [ˈantdɔʁf]) is a municipality in the Weilheim-Schongau district, in Bavaria, Germany.
