= Ann Smyrner =

Danish actress (1934–2016)

- Born: 3 November 1934; Frederiksberg, Denmark
- Died: 29 August 2016 (aged 81); Andalusia, Spain
- Occupation: Actress
- Years active: 1956–1971

Ann Smyrner (3 November 1934 – 29 August 2016) was a Danish actress who was active in the 1960s in Italy, the United States, Austria and West Germany. She played in adventure, comedy, science fiction, crime, and horror movies, among which are the Sidney Pink science fiction movies Reptilicus and Journey to the Seventh Planet (both 1962).

Ann Smyrner spent most of her screen career in Germany. After she retired from acting in 1971, she moved to Spain because, as she stated in a 2001 interview, "Both the country (Denmark) and its people are too cold and boring." Smyrner was the daughter of Danish stage actor Poul Smyrner.

== Selected filmography ==
- Von allen geliebt (1957) – Cora Fürst
- Lilli (1958) – Lilli
- Here I Am, Here I Stay (1959) – Karin
- Triplets on Board (1959) – Rita
- Mit 17 weint man nicht (1960) – Susa Petersen
- Heaven, Love and Twine (1960) – Gerti
- Pension Schöller (1960) – Erika
- Il peccato degli anni verdi (1960) – Martina
- Island of the Amazons (1960) – Liz
- Reptilicus (1961) – Lise Martens
- The Last of Mrs. Cheyney (1961) – Boubou
- Das Mädchen und der Staatsanwalt (1962) – Monika Pinkus
- Journey to the Seventh Planet (1962) – Ingrid
- Drei Liebesbriefe aus Tirol (1962) – Linda Borg
- Romance in Venice (1962) – Andrea von Bruggern
- Ohne Krimi geht die Mimi nie ins Bett (1962) – Marion Keyser
- Das haben die Mädchen gern (1962) – Helga
- Breakfast in Bed (1963) – Claudia Westorp
- The Black Cobra (1963) – Alexa Bergmann
- Wochentags immer (1963) – Gwendolyn
- Storm Over Ceylon (1963) – Helga Ferlach
- Piccadilly Zero Hour 12 (1963) – Ruth Morgan
- Victim Five (1964) – Helga
- Holiday in St. Tropez (1964) – Heidi Kirschmann
- The Seventh Victim (1964) – Avril Mant
- Marry Me, Cherie (1964) – Marianne
- The Spy (1964, Egyptian film, directed by Niazi Mostafa)
- Diamond Walkers (1965) – Karen Truter
- L'uomo di Toledo (1965) – Doña Rosita
- El jassus (1965) – Eva / Rashel
- The Fountain of Love (1966) – Stina
- Angelique and the King (1966) – Thérèse
- Kommissar X – Drei gelbe Katzen (1966) – Babs Lincoln
- Mission Stardust (1967) – Dr. Sheridan
- The House of 1,000 Dolls (1967) – Marie Armstrong
- Heubodengeflüster (1967) – Dodo
- Kiedy miłość była zbrodnią (1968) – Susanna Schwartz
- Beyond the Law (1968) – Lola / Betty
- The Killer Likes Candy (1968)
- Paradies der flotten Sünder (1968) – Laura
- Das Go-Go-Girl vom Blow Up (1969) – Wilma
- Why Did I Ever Say Yes Twice? (1969) – Püppi
- 11 Uhr 20 (1970, TV Mini-Series) – Helga
- The Sex Nest (1970) – Baronin
- Aunt Trude from Buxtehude (1971) – Loni Martell
- Zu dumm zum... (1971) – Clarissa
- Ore di terrore (1971) – Maria Daniels
- Kreuzfahrt des Grauens (1971) – Mary
