= Dracula in the Provinces =

1975 film directed by Lucio Fulci

- Italian theatrical release poster by Averardo Ciriello
- Directed by: Lucio Fulci
- Screenplay by: Pupi Avati; Bruno Corbucci; Mario Amendola; Lucio Fulci
- Story by: Lucio Fulci
- Starring: Lando Buzzanca; Sylva Koscina; Rossano Brazzi; Moira Orfei; John Steiner; Christa Linder; Francesca Romana Coluzzi; Ciccio Ingrassia; Valentina Cortese
- Cinematography: Sergio Salvati
- Edited by: Ornella Micheli
- Music by: Franco Bixio; Fabio Frizzi; Vince Tempera
- Production company: Coralta Cinematografica
- Distributed by: Titanus
- Release date: 31 August 1975 (Italy)
- Running time: 101 minutes
- Country: Italy
- Language: Italian

Dracula in the Provinces (Italian: Il cav. Costante Nicosia demoniaco ovvero: Dracula in Brianza, lit. The Noble devilish Costante Nicose or: Dracula in Brianza) is a 1975 Italian horror comedy film, directed by Lucio Fulci and starring Lando Buzzanca in the main role.

In the film, a superstitious businessman visits Bucharest and spends a night of revelry in the company of a Romanian count and his companions. After sharing a bed with the count, he is convinced that he has become a homosexual. He thinks that his newfound urge to drink blood is a coincidence, but he starts displaying vampiric traits and increasingly aggressive behavior. His newborn son has his own vampire fangs.

== Plot ==
Businessman Costante Nicosia has married for wealth. He has recently inherited a toothpaste factory and owns a basketball team. Nicosia is abusive to his employees and very superstitious. One day, a black cat crosses Nicosia's path, and he breaks a mirror in his apartment. Superstition demands that he persuade a virgin to urinate over the broken mirror to halt the tide of bad luck. He passes an old spinster who lives next door and mistakenly assumes she is a virgin.

Bowing to family pressure, Nicosia employs his loafing brother-in-law to the factory's menial post but fires him the following day after catching the man asleep on the job. That evening at a family gathering at his apartment, he is accosted by his in-laws, who try to shame him into giving the man his job back. Instead of acquiescing, Nicosia bursts into a tirade of rudeness against the singer's figure of his Great Aunt Maria. The old woman responds by uttering a curse. Nicosia dismisses her until she threatens to pour oil onto the floor; this bit of magical business makes Nicosia recant in a panic. Nicosia grovels for the curse to be lifted, and the old woman refuses to do so.

Days later, Nicosia is on a plane to Bucharest for a business conference. A man seated nearby introduces himself as Count Dragalescu and invites Nicosia to visit him at his castle. At the hotel, Nicosia discovers that the conference has been postponed, leaving him stranded for the weekend. Rather than spend the weekend in the hotel, Nicosia decides to call on the Count.

At the castle, Nicosia is greeted by Count Dragalescu when a group of revelers staggers down the staircase into the dining hall. The Count introduces his companions (three women and a man) to Nicosia, who is then sent to his room to prepare for dinner.

When Nicosia returns well dressed in a tuxedo, he finds himself overdressed for the occasion. Embarrassed, Nicosia sits down at the dinner table near a naked Count Dragalescu and his bevy of naked women. The evening gets even more debauched when Nicosia has too much to drink, disrobes, cavorts with the three nude women of the assembled throng, and then passes out cold. The next morning, he wakes up in his bed with the grinning Dragalescu lying next to him. The half-dressed Nicosia runs in horror from the castle and catches the first plane back to Italy.

Back in Italy, Nicosia fears having become a homosexual man. He goes to his physician Dr. Paluzzi, who suggests he should try making out with his mistress Liu; should he be unable to do so, this would mean he has been "deflowered while drunk." However, this attempt to re-establish his heterosexuality fails because the tormented Nicosia feels compelled lick blood from a wound on her leg after she falls and injures herself.

Disturbed, Nicosia calls on his Great Aunt Maria to beg her to remove the curse which, he assumes, is responsible for his homosexuality and blood craving. However, she claims that she had nothing to do with that. She recommends he visit the Magician of Noto in Sicily for help. Upon arriving at the Magician of Noto's residence, a desperate Nicosia sees that the magician is a fake, judging from his posture and tone of voice. But Nicosia accepts his advice: the curse on him will be lifted only if he re-hires his brother-in-law. The whole thing is actually a deliberate stunt organized by his in-laws for Nicosia's brother-in-law to recover his job. Returning home, Nicosia responds to his wife's Mariù sexual advances by plunging his fang-like teeth into her bare bottom while she is taking a bath. This leads to Mariù throwing him out of their apartment.

Over the next few weeks, Nicosia adopts devil-may-care aggression; he re-fires his brother-in-law, visits prostitutes to satisfy his urge to bite, and isolates himself from family and friends. At the climax, he satiates his craving by setting up a blood bank at his factory site and compelling all employees to attend. Just as he seems to have surrendered to total cynicism, his wife arrives at the factory with the news that she is pregnant; that was conceived during Nicosia's vampiric phase. In the final scene months later at a garden party in celebrating the birth of his son, and rejoicing at his proof of his potency, Nicosia goes to hold his infant son, only he is shocked to discover that the baby has fangs.

== Cast ==
- Lando Buzzanca: Cav. Costante Nicosia
- John Steiner: Count Dragulescu
- Moira Orfei: Bestia Assatanata
- Christa Linder: Liù Pederzoli
- Sylva Koscina: Mariù, wife of Costante
- Ciccio Ingrassia: Salvatore, the "Wizard of Noto"
- Valentina Cortese: Olghina Franchetti
- Francesca Romana Coluzzi: Wanda Torsello
- Rossano Brazzi: Dr. Paluzzi
- Carlo Bagno: Head Worker
- Ilona Staller: Gianka
- Antonio Allocca: Peppino

== Production ==
Right after principal shooting for Four of the Apocalypse was complete, director Lucio Fulci began working on a new comedy film the vein of Mel Brooks' Young Frankenstein. The film's screenplay included the comedy screenwriting team of Bruno Corbucci and Mario Amendola as well as Pupi Avati. Fulci has stated that Avati's contribution to the screenplay was only a few pages, specifically the trip to Romania, but not the trip to the night club. The dialogue in the film was revised to make it more spontaneous by Enzo Jannacci and Giuseppe Viola.

The film was shot in eight weeks between March and April 1975.

== Release ==
Dracula in the Provinces was distributed theatrically in Italy by Titanus on 31 August 1975. The film grossed a total of 940,484,803 Italian lire domestically on its initial theatrical release. Italian film historian and critic Roberto Curti noted that the film did "not do as well as expected" in the Italian box office. Fulci would declare it among his favorite films he directed.

The film was released with the English-language titles Young Dracula and Dracula in the Provinces.

== Reception ==
British film critic Tom Milne wrote that "the movie's assumption that its audience will share the view that homosexuality is both terrifying and ludicrous reeks of retarded rural Catholicism; the script is extremely garrulous and works like a sitcom rather than a cinematic crazy comedy."

== See also ==
- Cinema of Italy
- List of Italian films of 1975
- List of LGBTQ-related films of 1975
