= The Maddest Car in the World =

1975 film

- Directed by: Rudolf Zehetgruber
- Written by: Rudolf Zehetgruber
- Produced by: Otto Retzer; Rudolf Zehetgruber
- Starring: Rudolf Zehetgruber; Salvatore Borghese; Kathrin Oginski; Walter Giller
- Cinematography: Rüdiger Meichsner
- Music by: Gerhard Heinz
- Production company: Barbara Film
- Distributed by: Constantin Film
- Release date: 14 March 1975
- Running time: 96 minutes
- Country: West Germany
- Language: German

The Maddest Car in the World (German: Das verrückteste Auto der Welt) is a 1975 West German comedy film directed by Rudolf Zehetgruber starring Zehetgruber, Salvatore Borghese, Kathrin Oginski, and Walter Giller.

It was one of Zehetgruber's films in the Superbug film series. It was made as a response to the German box office success of The Love Bug (Herbie).

== Cast ==
- Rudolf Zehetgruber as Jimmy Bondi
- Salvatore Borghese as Aldo Regozzani
- Kathrin Oginski as Schwester Johanna
- Walter Giller as Jean-Pierre
- Walter Roderer as Jakob Robusti
- Ruth Jecklin as Fräulein Bingermeier, Robustis Assistentin
- Evelyne Kraft as Schwester Engelmunda
- Ulrich Beiger as Marchese de la Pozzi
- Peter W. Staub as Hotelbesitzer Häckli
- Gerd Frickhöffer as Mr. Brown II
- Walter Feuchtenberg as Mr. Brown I
- Marion Winter as Isabell
- Walter Saturni as Gollombin
- Gary Parello as Parello
- Vincenzo Biagi as Kommandant der Wache
- Oskar Klose as Chefreporter

== Bibliography ==
- Bock, Hans-Michael; Bergfelder, Tim, eds. (2009). The Concise Cinegraph: Encyclopaedia of German Cinema. New York: Berghahn Books. ISBN 978-1-57181-655-9.
