= Christa Linder =

German actress

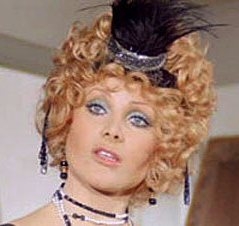
- Linder in Italian Graffiti (1973)
- Born: December 3, 1943 (age 82); Berchtesgaden, Bavaria, Germany
- Occupation: Actress
- Beauty pageant titleholder
- Years active: 1964–1982 (film & TV)
- Major competitions: Miss Austria 1962 (possible participant); Miss Universe 1962 (Top 15)

Christa Linder (December 3, 1943) is a German-Austrian former actress and beauty pageant contestant who represented Austria at Miss Universe 1962, where she placed Top 15.

== Selected filmography ==
- Condemned to Sin (1964)
- Kiss Kiss, Kill Kill (1966)
- Seven Vengeful Women (1966)
- The Fountain of Love (1966)
- The Strangler of the Tower (1966)
- Countdown to Doomsday (1966)
- The Rat Patrol Series TV S01E02 (1966)
- Day of Anger (1967)
- Lotus Flowers for Miss Quon (1967)
- Kommissar X – Drei grüne Hunde (1967)
- Vagabundo en la lluvia (1968)
- Negresco (1968)
- El águila descalza (1969)
- The Incredible Invasion (1971)
- Blood Feast (1972)
- Italian Graffiti (1973)
- The Magnificent Dare Devil (1973)
- Dracula in the Provinces (1975)
- Bel ami : l'emprise des caresses (1976)
- Hooper (1978)
- Moonlight (1982)

== Bibliography ==
- Thomas Weisser: Spaghetti Westerns: The Good, the Bad and the Violent. McFarland, 2005.
