= The Big Bust Out =

1972 Women in prison film

- Theatrical release poster
- Directed by: Ernst R. von Theumer (as Richard Jackson)
- Written by: Sergio Garrone; Ernst R. Von Theumer
- Produced by: Sergio Garrone
- Starring: Tony Kendall; Monica Teuber; William Berger; Gordon Mitchell; Vonetta McGee
- Cinematography: Umberto Galeassi (as Robert Galeasi)
- Edited by: Cesare Bianchini; Barbara Pokras
- Music by: Elsio Mancuso; Berto Pisano (as Burt Rexon)
- Distributed by: New World Pictures (US)
- Release dates: 1972 (Italy); 1973 (U.S.)
- Running time: 95 minutes (Italy); 75 minutes (US)
- Countries: Italy; West Germany
- Language: English

The Big Bust Out is the US title of an Italian women in prison film, The Crucified Girls of San Ramon (Io Monaca... per tre Carogne e Sette Peccatrici). The US rights were bought by Roger Corman for New World Pictures, who cut out 20 minutes for the US release.

Roger Corman later said the film was not very good, but he managed to make money from it.

== Synopsis ==
It tells the story of seven beautiful women who escape from a high-security prison. After the breakout, Rebecca (Karen Carter) and her fellow escapees find they are in more trouble than they had imagined as they become the victims of Miller Drake (Gordon Mitchell), who is involved in white slavery.

== Plot ==
Somewhere in southern climes: The Catholic sister Maria is completely absorbed in her work for the glory of God. She is currently taking care of the souls of a number of "sinners" (as the Italian film title euphemistically suggests), all convicts who are quite tough and hard-nosed, but who are regularly bullied and beaten, humiliated and sexually abused by their guards. Desperate to improve the living conditions of the girls, Maria appeals to the prison warden to allow seven of these women to work during the day under the supervision of guards (and God's) in the nearby convent. But these "seven sinners" are a sly old dog. They are anything but tame innocent lambs, and promptly manage to overpower and eliminate their guard on the first day. The other residents of the convent are forced by force of arms to get rid of their religious habit, since the female prisoners want to put it on so that they can flee quite inconspicuously as servants of God. To prevent the worst, Sister Maria joins the criminals armed with machine guns.

The escapees first try to find accommodation with an acquaintance. But this is a trap, as they fell straight into the arms of cold-smiling trafficker Bob Shaw. Shaw and his old pal Jeff have done quite a few things, but Jeff makes it perfectly clear that he doesn't get involved in trafficking in girls. And so Jeff refuses his ship to transport the girls further. The unscrupulous Bob plans to sell the women, including the nun Maria, to a sheikh named El Kadir. There is an exchange of gunfire when the police suddenly arrive at the port. The female “goods” are then loaded onto a truck. Jeff soon proves to be the savior of vulnerable women. Together, the small group tries to leave the country over the mountains under the glowing sun. But El Kadir is far from giving up, he doesn't want to just let his pretty "goods" get away. The nefarious Arab intends to bring them to his soldiers in the desert for their private pleasure. As they flee, the women are attacked and raped by other Muslim infidels who show no respect for Christian women. Black Nadja's back is whipped bloody by a sadistic dwarf.

Sister Maria is more than desperate, she is now even prepared to take up arms to save her charges. At one point, the nun finds herself in the greatest danger to her life when crazy, veiled Arab women almost stone her to death. A few more dangers follow, and when they think they are almost safe, they promptly run into El Kadir and his enlisted soldiers. Jeff is temporarily sidelined, leaving the women and the nun to finally surrender to the filthy, drooling Kadir people. Then comes the final showdown between the soldiers and the completely uninhibited, bestial Arabs, which ends extremely bloody. Now the believing nun also goes wild and helps to decimate the various opponents with the machine gun.

== Cast ==
- Tony Kendall as Jeff
- Monica Teuber as Sister Maria
- William Berger as Bob Shaw
- Gordon Mitchell as El-Kadir
- Vonetta McGee as Nada
- Christin Thorn as Lolita (as Christiane Thorn)
- Margaret Rose Keil as Gail
- Nuccia Cardinali as Inga (as Karen Carter)
- Linda Fox as Claire (as Patrizia Barbot)
- Felicita Fanny as Carmen
- Ivana Novak as Liane
- Herb Andress as Ivan "Little Ivan"
