= Skip Brittenham =

American attorney (1941–2025)

- Born: Harry Montague Brittenham II; September 6, 1941; Port Huron, Michigan, U.S.
- Died: July 17, 2025 (aged 83)
- Education: United States Air Force Academy; UCLA School of Law
- Occupation: Attorney
- Years active: 1970s–2025
- Known for: Entertainment law, film financing
- Spouse: Heather Thomas (m. 1992)
- Children: 3

Harry "Skip" Montague Brittenham II (September 6, 1941 – July 17, 2025) was an American attorney. He was known for representing actors and filmmakers and for his role in structuring major film financing and distribution deals in Hollywood.

== Early life and career ==
Brittenham was born on September 6, 1941, in Port Huron, Michigan. His father joined the US Air Force during World War II, and remained in the Air Force until 1966. As a result, Skip grew up all over the country, moving to New York, Mississippi, Alaska, and California.

After graduating high school, Brittenham joined the Air Force Academy. Although his eyesight was not good enough to become a pilot, he served in the Air Force before attending law school.

Brittenham graduated from the UCLA School of Law before co-founding Ziffren Brittenham LLP, with Ken Ziffren.

Throughout his career, he represented a number of notable people, including Harrison Ford, Eddie Murphy and other actors.

Within the entertainment industry, Brittenham was very well known and highly respected. At the same time, he was not well known to the general public, as he allegedly preferred to keep a low profile.

Brittenham died on July 17, 2025, at the age of 83.

== Personal life ==
Brittenham married Heather Thomas in 1992. They remained married until his death. Brittenham had three children, all girls: India, Kristina and Shauna, the youngest from his marriage to Heather Thomas, the older two from a prior relationship.
