= Brennus, Enemy of Rome =

- Directed by: Giacomo Gentilomo
- Written by: Adriano Bolzoni; Arpad DeRiso
- Starring: Gordon Mitchell
- Cinematography: Oberdan Troiani
- Music by: Carlo Franci
- Release date: 1963
- Language: Italian

Brenno il nemico di Roma (a.k.a. Brennus, Enemy of Rome and Battle of the Spartans) is a 1963 Italian peplum film directed by Giacomo Gentilomo. The movie portrays the sack of Rome in 387 BC and was written by Adriano Bolzoni, Arpad DeRiso, and Nino Scolaro.

== Plot ==
Rome, early 4th century BC. The Gallic king Brennus heads from northern Europe to the eternal city. In Rome, high-ranking political and military figures engage in affairs with local noblewomen, and the barbarian easily takes advantage. The Romans admit defeat and promise him a priestess, but her fiancé, Quintus Fabius, kidnaps her upon hearing about it. Brennus reacts by confronting and defeating the Romans, reaching Rome and obtaining a significant loot through plunder. However, Quintus Fabius returns to Rome, faces Brennus, and kills him in battle.

The movie's plot doesn't match the real events of the sack of Rome in 390 BC when the Senonian Gauls, led by Brennus, looted and occupied the city.

== Cast ==
- Gordon Mitchell as Brennus
- Ursula Davis as Nissia
- Massimo Serato as Marcus Furius Camillus
- Tony Kendall as Quintus Fabius
- Erno Crisa as Decius Vatinius
- Pietro Tordi as Vaxo
- Nerio Bernardi

== Reception ==
A contemporary review describes the film as a pseudo-historical depiction to which a sentimental plot has been added. The film is noted as one of the rare cinematographic depictions of the invasions of Northern Italy by the Senones.

== See also ==
- List of films set in ancient Rome
