= Tony Kendall (actor) =

Italian model and film actor (1936–2009)

- Born: Luciano Stella; 22 August 1936; Rome, Italy
- Died: 28 November 2009 (aged 73); Rome, Italy
- Occupation: Actor
- Years active: 1957–2008

Tony Kendall (22 August 1936 – 28 November 2009) was an Italian model turned film actor with over 50 film credits that reflect the trends of popular European cinema in the 1960s, 1970s, and 1980s.

== Biography ==
Born as Luciano Stella, Kendall was formerly a model for Italian Fumetti, comics done in photographs.

He changed his name to Tony Kendall at the suggestion of Vittorio De Sica in the fashion of many Italian actors whose films were shown in countries outside Italy in the days when European films proliferated. Stella made his film debut in Femmine Tre Volte in 1959 but didn't make another appearance until he used his new name of Tony Kendall in Brennus, Enemy of Rome (1963) one of the sword and sandal craze of films popular in the early 1960s.

Kendall is most famous for his various teamings with Brad Harris, with the two predating Terence Hill and Bud Spencer as a popular and prolific action team. In the derivative world of the European cinema of the 1960s, Kendall and Harris first teamed up in two sauerkraut western films "inspired" by the successful German Karl May Winnetou series with Harris as a Lex Barker clone and Kendall as a Native American "Chief Black Eagle" in The Pirates of the Mississippi (1963) and Black Eagle of Santa Fe (1965).

With the international success of the James Bond films and the German Jerry Cotton series, Kendall became best known for his role as private detective Joe Walker in the seven films of the Eurospy Kommissar X series where he played opposite Brad Harris in the role of New York Police Captain Tom Rowland. The popularity of Batman (TV series) led to Harris and Kendall appearing in The Three Fantastic Supermen (1967) the first in a long series that had stunt work performed by a young Jackie Chan (“The Three Fantastic Supermen in the Orient”).

Kendall has prominently appeared in other varieties of European cinema in the 1960s and 1970s such as Giallo horror (The Whip and the Body, 1963), spaghetti westerns (as Django in Django Against Sartana, 1970, and Gunman of 100 Crosses, 1971), crime movies such as Machine Gun McCain (1969), and adventure films such as Oil! (1977). He also appeared in European versions of women in prison (The Big Bust Out, 1972), zombie horror (Return of the Blind Dead, 1973), and films inspired by The Godfather (Corleone, 1978). Aside from an appearance in Alex l'ariete (2000), Kendall's last film role was in On the Dark Continent in 1993.

== Partial filmography ==
- Femmine tre volte (1957)
- The Whip and the Body (1963) - Christian Menliff
- The Pirates of the Mississippi (1963) - Schwarzer Adler
- Brennus, Enemy of Rome (1963) - Quinto Fabio
- The Hyena of London (1964) - Henry
- The Masked Man Against the Pirates (1964) - Captain Ruiz
- Black Eagle of Santa Fe (1965) - Chief Black Eagle
- Serenade for Two Spies (1965) - Pepino
- Kiss Kiss, Kill Kill (1966) - Jo Louis Walker / 'Kommissar X'
- Kommissar X – Drei gelbe Katzen (1966) - Jo Walker / Kommissar X
- Kommissar X – In den Klauen des goldenen Drachen (1966) - Jo Walker / Kommissar X
- The Three Fantastic Supermen (1967) - Tony
- Kommissar X – Drei grüne Hunde (1967) - Jo Walker / Kommissar X
- I criminali della metropoli (1967) - Sergente Perier
- Kommissar X - Drei blaue Panther (1968) - Jo Walker / Kommissar X
- Machine Gun McCain (1969) - Pete Zacari
- Kommissar X – Drei goldene Schlangen (1969) - Jo Walker / Kommissar X
- Hate Is My God (1969) - Il Nero / Carl
- Komm, süßer Tod (1969) - Nino
- Django Defies Sartana (1970) - Django
- Fighters from Ave Maria (1970) - John
- Crepa padrone, crepa tranquillo (1970)
- Brother Outlaw (1971) - Dakota
- In the Eye of the Hurricane (1971) - Miguel
- Gunman of One Hundred Crosses (1971) - Santana / Sartana / Django
- Tiger Gang (1971) - Jo Louis Walker / 'Kommissar X'
- Cerco de terror (1972) - Andrew
- Blood Story (1972) - Abraham French
- The Big Bust Out (1972) - Jeff
- The Loreley's Grasp (1973) - Sigurd, the Hunter
- The Off-Road Girl (1973) - Carlo
- Li chiamavano i tre moschettieri... invece erano quattro (1973) - D'Artagnan
- Return of the Blind Dead (1973) - Jack Marlowe
- La dernière bourrée à Paris (1973) - Victor
- I giochi proibiti dell'Aretino Pietro (1973) - Bitto Ranieri (segment "The Trick") / Fra' Luce (segment "The Miracle")
- La notte dell'ultimo giorno (1973) - Beppe Banti
- Bruna, formosa, cerca superdotato (1973) - Giovanni Pizzolla
- The Loreley's Grasp (1975) - Pietro Rossini
- Oil! (1977) - Tony
- Yeti: Giant of the 20th Century (1977) - Cliff Chandler
- Zanna Bianca e il grande Kid (1977) - Franky James
- Corleone (1978) - Salvatore Sperlazzo
- Cop or Hood (1979) - Rey
- Le Guignolo (1980) - Fredo
- Delitto sull'autostrada (1982) - Mr. Tarquini
- Attila flagello di Dio (1982) - Serpicio
- Death Stone (1987) - Miguel Gomez
- Thrilling Love (1989) - Alberto Stuart
- The Invisible Wall (1991) - Colonnello Aeronautica
- Nel continente nero (1993) - Ernesto
- Alex l'ariete (2000) - Comandante
- Voce del verbo amore (2007) - Ettore

== Death ==
Tony Kendall died in a hospital in Trigoria, Rome, Italy on 28 November 2009, aged 73, from an undisclosed illness.
