= Habach (Verwaltungsgemeinschaft) =

- Verwaltungsgemeinschaft
- Location of Habach within Weilheim-Schongau district
- Interactive map of Habach
- Location within Germany Location within Bavaria
- Coordinates: 47°44′N 11°17′E
- Country: Germany
- State: Bavaria
- Admin. region: Upper Bavaria
- District: Weilheim-Schongau
- Seat: Habach
- Subdivisions: 4 municipalities

Area
  - Total: 76.3 km^{2} (29.5 sq mi)

Population (2025-12-31)
  - Total: 5,270
  - Density: 69.1/km^{2} (179/sq mi)
- Time zone: UTC+01:00 (CET)
  - Summer (DST): UTC+02:00 (CEST)
- Website: www.vg-habach.de

Habach is a Verwaltungsgemeinschaft (municipal association) in the district Weilheim-Schongau in Bavaria, Germany. Its seat is in Habach.

It consists of the following municipalities:

1. Antdorf
2. Habach
3. Obersöchering
4. Sindelsdorf
