= Death Stone =

1987 film

- Directed by: Franz Josef Gottlieb
- Written by: Theo Maria Werner; Heinz-Werner John
- Produced by: Artur Brauner; Chandran Rutnam; Theo Maria Werner
- Starring: Albert Fortell; Heather Thomas; Elke Sommer
- Cinematography: Klaus Werner (
- Edited by: Renate Engelmann; Iris Hoffmann
- Music by: Luigi Ceccarelli
- Production companies: CCC Film; Taprobane Pictures
- Distributed by: Ring-Film-Verleih
- Release date: 2 July 1987
- Running time: 93 minutes (Germany)
- Countries: West Germany; Sri Lanka
- Language: German

Death Stone (German: Der Stein des Todes) is a 1987 West German-Sri-Lankan action film directed by Franz Josef Gottlieb and starring Albert Fortell, Heather Thomas, Elke Sommer, and Brad Harris. It was also released as Perahera and Jungle Fire.

== Plot ==
While in Sri Lanka attending the Esala Perahera festival, a man's girlfriend goes missing and is later found dead of a drug overdose. He then sets about going after the criminals who killed her.

== Cast ==
- Heather Thomas as Merryl Davis
- Elke Sommer as Kris Patterson
- Brad Harris as Brian
- Tony Kendall as Miguel Gomez
- Siegfried Rauch as Hemingway
- Albert Fortell as Kumar Cunningham
- Serge Falck as Frank
- Birte Berg as Jane Lindström
- Christian Anders as Fred

== Home media ==
In 2011 this film was released on DVD. The disc contains a German version of this film and as addition an interview with Brad Harris in English. Brad Harris discusses the film as well as about his film career in general.

== Background ==
Brad Harris also states in the aforementioned interview he had written parts of the screenplay and was responsible for the choreography of all fights. Among other things he also mentions the Italian actors had brought provisions from Italy with them and had advised the cooks in their hotels to fix them meals à la Italian cuisine.

== Bibliography ==
- Bock, Hans-Michael; Bergfelder, Tim, eds. (2009). The Concise Cinegraph: Encyclopaedia of German Cinema. New York: Berghahn Books. ISBN 978-1-57181-655-9.
