= Silvia Tortosa =

Spanish actress (1947–2024)

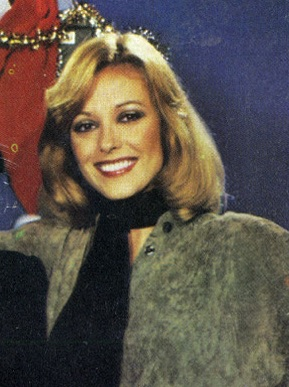
- Tortosa in 1979
- Born: Silvia Eulalia Tortosa López; 8 March 1947; Barcelona, Spain
- Died: 23 March 2024 (aged 77); Barcelona, Spain
- Occupation: Actress
- Years active: 1966–2024

Silvia Eulalia Tortosa López (8 March 1947 – 23 March 2024) was a Spanish actress. She appeared in more than sixty films beginning in 1966. Silvia Tortosa died of liver cancer on 23 March 2024, at the age of 77.

== Selected filmography ==
Year	Title	Role	Notes
1968	El padre Coplillas	Rocío López	
1972	Horror Express	Countess Irina Petrovski	
1973	The Loreley's Grasp	Elke Ackerman	
1973	The Girl from the Red Cabaret	Gina	
1977	Hasta que el matrimonio nos separe	Gloria	
1977	Unfinished Business	Ana	
1978	Tobi	Marga	
1978	Réquiem por un empleado	Pilar	
1978	The Frenchman's Garden	Amparo	
2013	Presentimientos	Sasha	
