= Es muss nicht immer Kaviar sein (TV series) =

West German TV miniseries

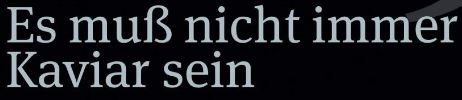
- Genre: Espionage
- Created by: Johannes Mario Simmel (novel); Ladislas Fodor; Horst Pillau
- Starring: Siegfried Rauch; Marisa Mell; Nadja Tiller; Christiane Krüger; Heinz Reincke; Diana Körner; Erik Schumann; Rainer Penkert; Reinhard Kolldehoff; Dieter Borsche; Andrea Rau; Günther Stoll; Hildegard Krekel; Günther Kaufmann; Barbara Valentin; Herbert Fleischmann; Wolfgang Lukschy; Walter Reyer; Tito García; Víctor Israel; Antonio Pica; Antonio Molino Rojo; Dan van Husen; Rolf Schimpf
- Theme music composer: Martin Böttcher
- Opening theme: Martin Böttcher
- Composers: Andreas Köbner; Stefan Traub; Mario Lauer
- Country of origin: West Germany
- Original language: German
- No. of seasons: 1
- No. of episodes: 13

Production
- Executive producer: Artur Brauner
- Camera setup: Hansjürgen Kiebach; Michael Marszalek; Georg Mondi
- Running time: 60 (including the recipe)
- Production companies: Berliner Union-Film; CCC-Television

Original release
- Release: 11 May – 19 October 1977

Es muss nicht immer Kaviar sein ("It Can’t Always Be Caviar") is a West German television series, an adaption of the novel of the same name by Austrian author Johannes Mario Simmel. Directed by Thomas Engel, Siegfried Rauch walks in the footsteps of O. W. Fischer, who played the protagonist Thomas Lievenalready in 1961, just one year after the bestseller had been released. The series is unique for providing a little cooking show at the end of each episode. The book also includes recipes because the Thomas Lieven character is an accomplished amateur cook.

== Plot ==
Thomas Lieven works as employee of an international bank in the City of London. Occasionally, he is the bank's courier, for he is fluent in three languages: English of course, but also German and French. In 1939, he is again sent to Germany, but this time is different because the Gestapo arrests him. Thomas Lieven, a pacifist through and through, has no interest whatsoever to even toy with the thought to get entangled in spy business, but the German secret service does not take no for an answer. So, he has to pretend compliance for the time being, just to be able to get home to England, but when he returns to London, he gets arrested again, this time by English secret service, who explain to him that it was his duty to become a double agent. Thomas Lieven is no Eddie Chapman, and the mere idea of having to go to Nazi Germany another time seems to be unbearable. He escapes to France, but is picked up by French secret service. Like German Major Loos (Herbert Fleischmann) and British Mr. Lovejoy (Rainer Penkert), French Captain Simeon (Erik Schumann) attempts to persuade Lieven that he ought to serve him. In the course of a mission in Marseille, he meets small-time criminal Bastian Fabre (Heinz Reincke), who introduces him to his boss, an attractive lady called Chantal (Marisa Mell). She falls for his gentlemanly manners and his exquisite meals, which she has in common with other ladies, and with whom he will also become acquainted during the adventures about to come: Estrella (Nadja Tiller), Yvonne (Heidrun Kussin), Jeanne (Louise Martini), and eventually Helen (Christiane Krüger), who wants to recruit him for the American secret service.

The series covers only the first half of the novel. The second half was never filmed.

== Episode overview ==
Episode	Title	Original Air Date	Presented Recipe
01	Wie alles begann (How it all started)	11 May 1977	Sauerkraut cooked with champagne
02	Französische Küche (French cooking)	25 May 1977	Palatschinke
03	Wenn die Eisbären flügge werden (When polar bears fledge)	8 June 1977	Romanian onion salad
04	Ich heiße Mabel (I'm named Mabel)	22 June 1977	Stew of beans and goose legs
05	Tote kann man nicht erschießen (Can't kill dead people)	6 July 1977	Chop suey American style
06	Planquadrat 135 Z (Grid square 135 Z)	20 July 1977	Stuffed grey partridge
07	Shakespeare lässt bitten ( Shakespeare asks you in)	3 August 1977	Home fries
08	Lazarus	17 August 1977	"Matelotte" (French fish soup)
09	Chantal	31 August 1977	Bigos, a Polish stew
10	Die ganz feine Tour (In a very distinguished manner)	14 September 1977	Chili con carne
11	Nummer Sieben (Number seven)	28 September 1977	Swiss collarsteaks from pork
12	Nachtigall 17 ruft (Nightingale 17 is calling)	12 October 1977	Rump steak
13	Schwarzmarktgeschäfte (Black market trade)	19 October 1977	Steak tartare with caviar
