= Drei Liebesbriefe aus Tirol =

1962 Austrian film

Drei Liebesbriefe aus Tirol is a 1962 Austrian comedy film directed by Werner Jacobs and starring Ann Smyrner, Trude Herr and Paul Hörbiger.

== Partial cast ==
- Ann Smyrner - Linda Borg
- Udo Jürgens - Martin Hinterkirchner
- Hans Moser - Leopold Hinterkirchner
- Paul Hörbiger - Dr. Franz Kajetan
- Trude Herr - Isolde Fürchtenich
- Kurt Großkurth - A. B. Cobold
- Hans Richter - Peter Zwanziger
- Annie Rosar - Cäsarina Zwanziger
- Rudolf Carl - Eberhard Knoll
