= Black Candles (film) =

- Spanish: Los ritos sexuales del diablo
- Literally: The Sexual Rites of the Devil
- Directed by: José Ramón Larraz
- Screenplay by: José Ramón Larraz
- Produced by: Nancy Rolseth
- Starring: Helga Liné; Vanessa Hidalgo; Jeffrey Healy
- Cinematography: Juan Mariné
- Edited by: Harold Wallmann
- Release date: 1982
- Running time: 84 minutes
- Country: Spain
- Language: English

Black Candles (Spanish: Los ritos sexuales del diablo, lit. The Sexual Rites of the Devil) is a 1982 exploitation horror film directed by José Ramón Larraz and starring Helga Liné, Vanessa Hidalgo, Carmen Carrión and Jeffrey Healey.

== Plot ==
Black Candles is about a young woman named Carol, who is drawn into a Satanic sex cult in England following the abrupt death of her brother. Everything starts off seemingly innocent but soon Carol finds herself more immersed into a sinister, sadistic world of debauchery, violence as well as utter depravity that she may never be able to escape from as the cult members' grip begins take hold onto her mind, body and soul. Will the woman be able to break free of their baleful restraints or will she be a prisoner of the sexual rites of the devil forever?

== Cast ==
- Helga Liné as Fiona
- Vanessa Hidalgo as Carol
- Carmen Carrión as Georgina
- Jeffrey Healy as Pablo / Robert
- Alfred Lucchetti as John
- Manuel Gómez-Álvarez as Reverend Hübner
- Tito Valverde as Steve
