= The Black Cobra (1963 film) =

1963 film

- Film poster
- Directed by: Rudolf Zehetgruber
- Written by: Roman Schliesser; Rudolf Zehetgruber
- Produced by: Adolf Eder
- Starring: Adrian Hoven
- Cinematography: Hans Jura
- Edited by: Paula Dvorak
- Production company: Wiener Stadthalle-Station Betriebs-und Produktionsgesellschaft
- Distributed by: Nora-Filmverleih
- Release date: 17 May 1963
- Running time: 96 minutes
- Country: Austria
- Language: German

The Black Cobra (German: Die Schwarze Kobra) is a 1963 Austrian Crime film directed by Rudolf Zehetgruber and starring Adrian Hoven.

== Cast ==
- Adrian Hoven - Peter Karner
- Ann Smyrner - Alexa Bergmann
- Wolfgang Preiss - Stanislas Raskin
- Paul Dahlke - Dr.Langhammer, Kommissar
- Hans Richter - Insp. Knecht
- Peter Vogel - Krim.Ass. Dr. Alois Dralle
- Emmerich Schrenk - Freddy
- Klaus Löwitsch - Boogie
- Klaus Kinski - Koks-Charly / Charley 'The Snow'
- Marianne Schönauer - Paola Manuzzo
- Raoul Retzer - Martinez Manuzzo
- Herbert Fux - Marco
- Günter Meisner - Wunderlich ('Mr. Green')
- C. W. Fernbach - Lullaby
- Ady Berber - Punkti
- Hilde Wagener - Baronin Wyspianski
- Michel Ujevic - Goba
- Terry Van Ginderen - Simone, Barfrau
