= The Loreley's Grasp =

- Original Spanish release poster
- Directed by: Amando de Ossorio
- Written by: Amando de Ossorio
- Produced by: Ricardo Muñoz Suay; Ricardo Sanz
- Starring: Tony Kendall; Helga Liné; Silvia Tortosa; Josefina Jartin; Loreta Tovar; José Thelman; Luis Induni
- Cinematography: Miguel Fernández Mila
- Edited by: Antonio Gimeno
- Music by: Antón García Abril
- Production companies: C.C. Astro; Profilmes
- Distributed by: Aitor Films
- Release date: 15 June 1973 (Madrid)
- Running time: 85 minutes
- Country: Spain
- Language: Spanish

The Loreley's Grasp (Spanish: Las Garras de Lorelei, lit. 'The Claws of Lorelei') is a 1973 Spanish horror film written and directed by Amando de Ossorio, and starring Tony Kendall, and Helga Liné. The film centers on a series of horrific murders in a German town by the Rhine river perpetrated by a deadly water spirit known as the Lorelei.

The film was released in theaters in the United States under the title The Swinging Monster on August 24, 1976, but most famously a few years later under the title When the Screaming Stops. It was later released on VHS in 1985 under the latter title before being released on DVD in 2007 under the original English export title. Critical reception for the film has been mostly negative, with criticism directed towards the film's script, and phony monster costume.

== Plot ==
In a small German village near the Rhine river, a nearby boarding school is plagued by a series of grisly murders of its female students every full moon. Locals in the area blame the killings on a legendary water spirit known as The Lorelei, which is said to reside in a grotto beneath the Rhine river, and transform from a beautiful woman into a reptilian monster that hungers for human blood every full moon. As the murders continue, an experienced hunter named Sigurd is hired by boarding school teacher Elke Ackerman to guard the school. Sigurd sets a 9 o clock curfew on all the boarding school's residents, during which all the windows and doors are to be locked and no one is to leave the school grounds during that time.

One night while patrolling the school grounds, Sigurd encounters a mysterious cloaked woman who runs off after noticing him. Later that night, while bathing in a nearby lake, Sigurd once again encounters the mysterious woman but is unable to catch her. In his search for the woman, he encounters Professor Von Lander who has been studying the creature for some time. Taking him back to his lab, Lander reveals to Sigurd that the Lorelei can transform into a monster by the light of the full moon. Lander also reveals that he made an irradiated dagger that is capable of reverting the Lorelei back to its human form. Meanwhile a small hunting party is slaughtered by the creature. It's revealed that the mysterious woman stalking Sigurd is the Lorelei, however Sigurd has fallen under Lorelei's spell and refuses to believe that she's responsible for the murders. While under Lorelei's influence, Sigurd accidentally reveals Von Lander's involvement.

Lorelei, along with her human servant Alberic, murder Von Lander and destroy his research in an effort to prevent anyone from stopping her. Sigurd, who has now come to believe that Lorelei is somehow responsible for the killings, later discovers an underwater cave while diving, which leads to a hidden temple inhabited by Lorelei, Alberic, and a horde of feral women. Sigurd is soon discovered and captured. While Sigurd is restrained, a vengeance-driven Lorelei heads to the boarding school to murder Elke, after discovering Sigurd's feelings for her. One of the feral women manages to help Sigurd, freeing him and perishing along with the temple's inhabitants as the dynamite Sigurd had previously set goes off.

Arriving at the boarding house with the irradiated dagger, Sigurd manages to slay the murderous Lorelei before she is able to make Elke her next victim.

== Cast ==
- Tony Kendall as Sigurd, the Hunter
- Helga Liné as Lorelei
- Silvia Tortosa as Elke Ackerman, the Teacher
- Betsabé Ruiz as Bride
- Josefina Jartin as Boarding School Principal
- Loreta Tovar as Martha
- José Thelman as Carlo Donati
- Luis Induni as Mayor
- Ángel Menéndez as Professor Von Lander

== Release ==
Las Garras de Lorelei was released theatrically in Spain on May 9, 1973. It was later released in the United States under the alternate title The Swinging Monster on August 24, 1976. It was famously rereleased a few years later under the title When the Screaming Stops, with distributor Independent Artists adding a "Shock Notice" gimmick where red warning flashes preceded each gory murder.

=== Home media ===
The film was released on VHS by Lightning Video in 1985 under the When the Screaming Stops title, with the "Shock Notice" gimmick retained; an EP-speed VHS edition was released on September 29, 1993.

BCI released the film on DVD Special Edition, on November 13, 2007. On November 20, 2008, it was released on DVD by Sinister Cinema. It was later released for the first time on Blu-ray by Shout Factory on August 8, 2017; as both a single feature, and a double feature with The Night Of The Sorcerers.

== Reception ==
Robert Firsching from Allmovie gave the film a negative review, writing, "Except for an interesting undersea production design, some extreme and phony gore, and some uncommonly beautiful women, Las Garras de Lorelei is one of Armando De Ossorio's most unwatchable efforts, and every murder is preceded by an annoying flash of red screen." The Bloody Pit of Horror awarded the film a mediocre 2/4 stars, noting the film's good use of outdoor locations, haunting music score, and good cinematography. However, they criticized the film's lead actor as being "bland" and "uninteresting", weak creature design, and script. TV Guide rated the film 2/5 stars, stating, " this odd blend of German legend and '70s Euro-horror conventions is distinguished by the red flashes that precede each gory murder." The Terror Trap gave the film 2.5 out of 4 stars, calling it "a fairly gory spanish dish, with some nice heart rippings, an attractive cast and a cool creature feature mood".

Not all reviews, however, were negative. Digital Retribution awarded the film a score of 4/5, calling it, "a masterful work of horror which has been shamefully overlooked, both by the audience of its time, as well as today's Saw-hungry crowds". Kurt Dahlke from DVD Talk gave the film a positive review calling it "[an] unusual love story with torn out hearts", commending the film's moments of suspense, and unusual premise, while also noting the poor creature design. Steve Barton from Dread Central rated the film a score of 4/5, calling it "[an] over-the-top unintentionally side-splitting comedy". Samm Deighan of Diabolique Magazine noted the film's script, while "a total mess" but felt that it was refreshing, writing, "If you’re expecting something atmospheric and doom-laden, think again. This blend of horror and fantasy is a lot of fun, with some nice scares and decent effects. The monster’s attacks are surprisingly fast-paced and vicious, and the gore–mostly torn flesh–rises above the film’s meager budget."
