= Brad Harris =

American actor (1933–2017)

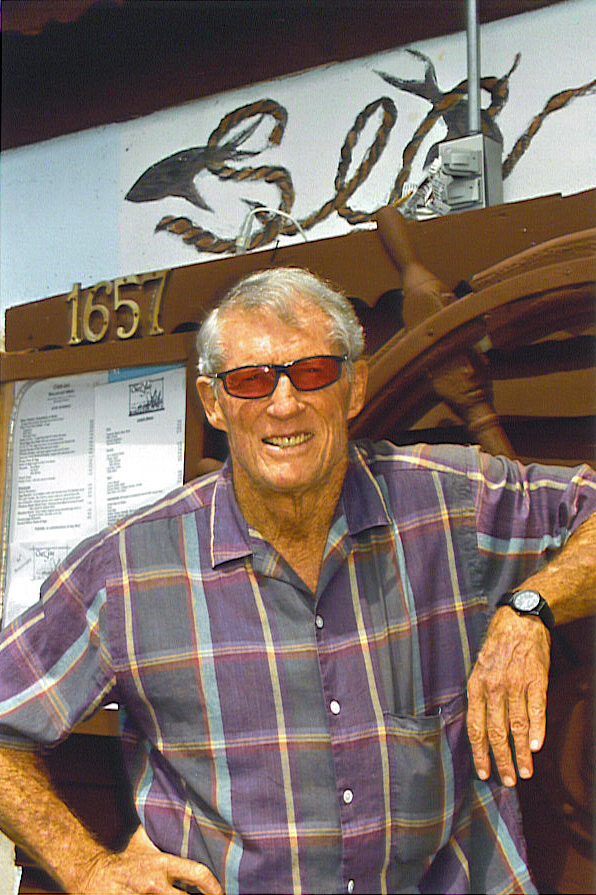
- Harris in 2004
- Born: Bradford Harris; July 16, 1933; St. Anthony, Idaho, U.S.
- Died: November 7, 2017 (aged 84); Santa Monica, California, U.S.
- Occupations: Actor, stuntman
- Spouse: Olga Schoberová (m. 1967; div. 1969)
- Children: 1

Bradford Harris (July 16, 1933 – November 7, 2017) was an American actor and stuntman. He appeared in a variety of roles in over 50 films, mostly in European productions. He was an inductee in the Stuntman's Hall of Fame.

== Early life ==
Born in St. Anthony, Idaho, Harris' family moved to California, where he attended Burbank High School, then received an athletic scholarship to UCLA where he studied economics. When he injured his knee playing football he was advised to take up weightlifting to strengthen the injury that developed his interest in bodybuilding.

== Career ==
Harris entered films as a stand-in, stuntman, and later an actor. His first roles were in André de Toth's Monkey on My Back and Li'l Abner. With his athletic physique, Harris travelled to Rome to watch the 1960 Summer Olympics and perform stunts in Stanley Kubrick's Spartacus. He stayed in Europe for the boom in European sword and sandal, Eurospy, and Spaghetti Western genres.

Harris discovered, when working in Germany, that stunt coordinators were nonexistent in that country and he often did extra duties as a stuntman, stunt coordinator, and second unit director as well as an actor.

Harris made his debut as a leading man in 1961 in the title role of Gianfranco Parolini's Goliath Against the Giants and Samson. He would have a long, continuing relationship in several films written and directed by Parolini. Harris also began to be teamed with Tony Kendall, starting with the Western Pirates of the Mississippi. He later married his co-star in Black Eagle of Santa Fe, the sequel to that film.

Harris teamed again with Kendall and Parolini in the Kommissar X series, and The Three Fantastic Supermen/I Fantastici Tre Supermen (1967) series.

He served as executive producer on several of his films including King of Kong Island (which he also starred in) and Jack Cardiff's The Mutations. He later made seven appearances on the soap opera Falcon Crest as "Deputy Duffy". His most recent film was the Andrea Zaccariello's comedy Boom, released in 1999.

Harris invented and marketed exercise products called "AB-OrigOnals." He owned a company called Modern Body Design. In 2015, he was awarded the University of Arizona College of Humanities' Distinguished Lifetime Achievement Award in the Humanities.

== Personal life ==
He married Czech actress Olga Schoberová on November 16, 1967, and divorced in 1969. They had a daughter named Babrinka (Sabrina).

He died on November 7, 2017, at the age of 84.

== Selected filmography ==
- The McConnell Story (1955) – Pilot (uncredited)
- Monkey on My Back (1957) – Spike McAvoy
- Speed Crazy (1959) – Bit Part (uncredited)
- Li'l Abner (1959) – Muscleman Luke (uncredited)
- Tall Story (1960) – Student by Fire (uncredited)
- 13 Fighting Men (1960) – Pvt. Fowler
- Ocean's 11 (1960) – Minor Role (uncredited)
- Spartacus (1960) – Gladiator / Soldier (uncredited)
- Goliath Against the Giants (1961) – Goliath
- Samson (1961) – Samson
- The Fury of Hercules (1962) – Hercules
- The Hot Port of Hong Kong (1962) – Polizeiinspektor McLean
- It Happened in Athens (1962) – Garrett (uncredited)
- 79 A.D. (1962) – Marcus Tiberius
- The Old Testament (1962) – Simone
- The Black Panther of Ratana (1963) – Larry Finch
- The Pirates of the Mississippi (1963) – Tom Cook
- Mission to Hell (1964) – Joe Warren
- Mystery of the Red Jungle (1964) – Larry McLean
- The Secret of the Chinese Carnation (1964) – Donald Ramsey
- Massacre at Marble City (1964) – Phil Stone
- Black Eagle of Santa Fe (1965) – Cliff McPherson
- Our Man in Jamaica (1965) – Captain Mike Jefferson
- Kiss Kiss, Kill Kill (1966) – Capt. Tom Rowland
- Kommissar X – Drei gelbe Katzen (aka Death is Nimble, Death is Quick) (1966) – Capt. Tom Rowland
- Kommissar X – In den Klauen des goldenen Drachen (aka So Darling So Deadly) (1966) – Capt. Tom Rowland
- The Three Fantastic Supermen (1967) – Brad McCallum
- The Ten Million Dollar Grab (1967) – Robert Colman
- Kommissar X – Drei grüne Hunde (aka Death Trip) (1967) – Capt. Tom Rowland
- Spy Today, Die Tomorrow (1967) – Cliff
- Rattler Kid (1967) – Sheriff Bill Manners
- Kommissar X – Drei blaue Panther (1968) – Capt. Tom Rowland
- Cheers to Cyanide (1968) – George
- King of Kong Island (1968) – Burt Dawson
- Kommissar X – Drei goldene Schlangen (1969) – Capt. Tom Rowland
- Poppea's Hot Nights (1969) – Claudio Valerio
- Patton (1970) – Sergeant in Bar (uncredited)
- Che fanno i nostri supermen tra le vergini della jungla? (1970) – Captain Brad Scott
- When the Bell Tolls (1970) – Don Vincenzo
- Maniacs on Wheels (1970) – Ken Stark
- Wanted Sabata (1970) – Sabata
- The Mad Butcher (1971) – Mike Lawrence
- Here's Django... Pay or Die! (1971) – Durango
- Il ritorno del gladiatore più forte del mondo (1971) – Marzio
- Kommissar X jagt die roten Tiger (aka Tiger Gang) (1971) – Capt. Tom Rowland
- Death Is Sweet from the Soldier of God! (1972) – Django / Durango
- Zambo, King of the Jungle (1972) – George Ryon aka Zambo
- This Time I'll Make You Rich (1974) – Brad McCoy
- The Girl in Room 2A (1974) – Charlie
- The Mutations (1974) – Brian Redford
- Who Breaks... Pays (1975) – Placido
- Lady Dracula (1977) – Kommissar
- The Beast in Heat (1977) – Don Lorenzo (uncredited)
- Brass Target (1978) – Lt. Rowan
- Zwei tolle Käfer räumen auf (1979) – Don Fernando Hidalgo
- Challenge of the Tiger (1980) – Leopard
- Good-bye, Cruel World (1983) – Policeman
- Hercules (1983) – King Augeias
- The Seven Magnificent Gladiators (1983) – Scipio
- Death Stone (1987) – Brain
- Boom (1999) – Gordon Steele (segment "Il figlio di Maciste")
- Shiver (2012) – The Captain (final film role)
