= Tiger Gang =

1971 film

- Italian film poster
- Directed by: Harald Reinl
- Screenplay by: Theo Maria Werner; Klaus E.R. von Schwarze; Werner P. Zibaso
- Based on: Kommissar X by Bert F. Island
- Produced by: Theo Maria Werner; Ilse Kubaschewski
- Starring: Mohammad Ali; Brad Harris; Tony Kendall; Gisela Hahn
- Cinematography: Francesco Izzarelli
- Edited by: Antonietta Zita
- Music by: Francesco de Masi, Deebo Bhattacharya (Pakistani version)
- Production companies: Regina Film Theo Maria Werner; KG Divina-Film GmbH & Co.; Virginia Cinematografica S.r.l.
- Distributed by: Variety Distribution
- Release date: 20 August 1971
- Running time: 89 minutes
- Countries: Pakistan; West Germany; Italy
- Languages: Urdu; German; Italian

The Tiger Gang (German: Kommissar X jagt die roten Tiger) is a 1971 Kommissar X Eurospy film directed by Harald Reinl that was an international co-production between West Germany, Italy & Pakistan.

== Cast ==
- Tony Kendall as Jo Louis Walker
- Brad Harris as Captain Tom Rowland
- Gisela Hahn Jacky Clay
- Mohammad Ali as Superintendent Ali
- Zeba as Shirin
- Ernst Fritz Fürbringer as Professor Tavaria / Frank Stefani
- Rainer Basedow as Ted Woolner
- Nino Korda as Paradiso
- Nisho as Deeba Khan
- Ursula Campbell as Air Hostess
- Ali Ejaz as Waheed
- Qavi Khan as Hassan
- Khalid Saleem Mota
