= Tobi (film) =

- Directed by: Antonio Mercero
- Written by: Horacio Varcarcel; Antonio Mercero
- Produced by: Antonio Martin
- Starring: Lolo Garcia; Francisco Vidal; Norma Aleandro; Antonio Ferrandis; Walter Vidarte
- Cinematography: Manuel Rojas
- Edited by: Javier Moran
- Production company: Blau Films
- Distributed by: C.B. Films S.A.
- Release date: December 19, 1978 (Spain theatrical)
- Running time: 91 minutes
- Country: Spain
- Language: Spanish

Tobi (or Tobi el niño con alas) is a 1978 Spanish comedy written by Horacio Varcarcel and Antonio Mercero. Directed by Antonio Mercero, it stars Lolo Garcia, Francisco Vidal, Norma Aleandro, Antonio Ferrandis and Walter Vidarte. In the film a young boy, Tobi, grows wings on his back which give him the appearance of an angel. This phenomenon draws attention to his community, which includes doctors, scientists and schoolmates. After Tobi's wings are surgically removed, they grow back.

== Plot ==
Tobi and his parents, Jacinto and María López, are at a picnic. Back home, Tobi begins feeling strange itches on his back and is brought to the hospital for an evaluation. The next day, Tobi's parents learn that a pair of wings have grown from the itchy spots on his back. The hospital separates Tobi and his parents, but they can watch him through a one-way window. The doctors cannot explain why Tobi grew the wings and Jacinto, concerned about his son’s future, asks the doctors to remove them surgically. María is upset, and says that she wants Tobi back with or without his wings.

Tobi asks his nurse Lucy for his parents, and she says he will see them soon. Disappointed and lonely, he escapes from the clinic with no clothing. Tobi hides in a garbage pail, which two workers load into a truck. He escapes, hiding in a box which is brought into a store, and blends in with the mannequins. An employee hears Tobi sneeze, but the boy remains still and is not discovered. He begins to play tricks, kicking the employee and hiding again. The employee finds Tobi, the only "mannequin" who is anatomically accurate, and flees in a panic. Tobi runs away from the store, heading home through the city. He wants to see his mother and asks a drunk man (who thinks he is hallucinating) for help. A passer-by sees Tobi talking to the drunk man, takes photographs and gives them to the media.

Back home, Tobi and his parents hear a doctor say on television that the clinic should study him further; the doctors consider him to be Homo angelicus, rather than Homo sapiens. In a crowd outside their house, Professor Jourdain unsuccessfully tries to convince Tobi’s parents to return him to the clinic. To satisfy the crowd, his mother picks Tobi up and shows them his wings. Jacinto befriends media worker Marla Sullivan, who makes him offers he refuses because his son is not for sale. She then offers Jacinto a better job, which he accepts. Tobi reluctantly appears in a deodorant commercial, ruining every scene and angering the director. After he works all day, Tobi’s mother takes him home without finishing the commercial. She makes him a cover for his wings for him to wear to school.

When a classmate pulls Tobi's wings, their teacher seats Tobi apart from the others to protect him. He stays in the classroom during recess to avoid the other boys, and becomes friends with a little girl. Tobi shows her his wings, and is seen by another classmate who tells his friends; the group demands that Tobi show them his wings. Maria is summoned to school and told that Tobi’s presence is a distraction to the other students. When, back home, he begins having nightmares he has his wings removed. Tobi is discharged from the hospital to continued media attention, Marla Sullivan tells Jacinto that he is liable for breach of contract. Maria brings Tobi to the park, where he again feels an itch on his back. When Marla hears on the news that Tobi’s wings have grown back, she exhibits him at a carnival as "Tobi, the boy with wings". The boy escapes, climbing to the top of a tower; he flies away, leaving the crowd, his parents and his clothes behind.

== Cast ==
- Lolo Garcia as Tobi López
- Norma Aleandro as the professor
- Antonio Ferrandis as Doctor Juldain
- Walter Vidarte as Enfermero
- Francisco Vidal as Jacinto
- Silvia Tortosa as Marga
- José Lifante as Marga's friend
- Andrés Mejuto as Professor Burman
- María Casanova as María
- Manuela Camacho as Luci
- Lorenzo Ramírez as Borracho
- Jose Yepes as Photographer
- Fabián Conde as Dolfo

== Reception ==
Tobi has not been reviewed on Rotten Tomatoes.
