= Ken Ziffren =

American attorney (born 1940)

- Born: June 24, 1940 (age 86); Chicago, Illinois, U.S.
- Education: Northwestern University; UCLA School of Law
- Occupations: Entertainment attorney Law professor

Ken Ziffren (born June 24, 1940) is an American entertainment attorney. In 1978, he co-founded the Century City-based entertainment law firm Ziffren Brittenham LLP with Skip Brittenham. In 2014, Los Angeles mayor Eric Garcetti appointed Ziffren as the city's second "film czar" to advocate on behalf of the city to the state of California in regards to tax credits for in-state film production, taking the position over from the late Tom Sherak. As of 2021, he has remained in this role.

A 1962 graduate of Northwestern University and a 1965 graduate of UCLA School of Law, Ziffren clerked for U.S. Supreme Court Chief Justice Earl Warren upon graduation from the latter. He has served as an adjunct faculty member at UCLA Law since 1998 and, in 2015, he donated $5M to the school to found the school's Ziffren Center for Media, Entertainment, Technology and Sports Law.

Ziffren's father, Paul Ziffren, was instrumental in bringing the 1960 Democratic National Convention and the 1984 Summer Olympics to Los Angeles.

== See also ==
- List of law clerks for the chief justice of the United States
