= Christian Anders =

Austrian singer

- Born: Antonio Augusto Schinzel-Tenicolo; 15 January 1945 (age 81); Bruck an der Mur, Nazi Germany
- Occupations: Singer, musician, composer and author
- Spouse: Birgit Diehn

Christian Anders (15 January 1945; real name Antonio Augusto Schinzel-Tenicolo) is an Austrian singer, musician, composer, author and conspiracy theorist.

== Life ==
Anders was born in Bruck an der Mur, Austria (then part of Nazi Germany). In his childhood he lived with his family in Cagliari, Sardinia. When he was 10 years old, his family came to West Germany and lived in Offenbach am Main. After school he became an electrician. Anders began to sing German schlager songs and was famous as a singer during the 1970s and 1980s.

In the 1970s he wrote some novels. Around 2000 he started writing several books with esoteric and conspiracy theory content under the pseudonym Lanoo.

Since 2006 Anders has been married to Birgit Diehn.

== Conspiracy theories ==
- Anders is anti-vaccination and described in an interview "children's vaccinators" as "child molesters", claiming that without exception all vaccinations were completely ineffective and would only trigger and spread the disease that they were supposed to prevent.
- Regarding the crash of Germanwings flight 9525 in 2015, which had been caused by the pilot, Anders argued that the passengers had already been killed by organ procurement before the start of the flight.
- On the Corona pandemic, he published the pseudo-scientific book Corona. Fakt oder Fake? and the children's book Die Abenteuermaus und die Corona Helden. In a new version of his best-known song, titled Es fährt ein Zug nach Corona, he shares the view that COVID-19 is just the influenza that politicians and the pharmaceutical industry want to make money from. Oliver Kalkofe recorded a parody of Anders' short video.

== Songs ==
- "Als wir uns trafen" (1968)
- "Spanischer Wein" (1968)
- "Mexico" (1968)
- "Little Girl" (1968)
- "Happy Love" (1968)
- "Geh' nicht vorbei" (1969)
- "Sylvia" (1969)
- "Morgen abend" (1969)
- "Ein Mann weint keine Träne" (1970)
- "Du gehörst zu mir" (1970)
- "Nie mehr allein" (1970)
- "Von Mann zu Mann" (1971)
- "Dich will ich lieben" (1971)
- "Ich lass Dich nicht gehn" (1971)
- "Du hast sie verloren" (1971)
- "Das schönste Mädchen das es gibt" (1971)
- "Maria Lorena" (1971)
- "Es fährt ein Zug nach Nirgendwo" (1972)
- "Train To Nowhere Land" (1972)
- "6 Uhr früh in den Straßen" (1972)
- "In den Augen der anderen" (1972)
- "It's Out of My Hands" (1973)
- "Six O'Clock in The Morning" (1973)
- "Das Schiff der großen Illusionen" (1973)
- "Einsamkeit hat viele Namen" (1974)
- "Niemandsland" (1974)
- "Wer liebt hat keine Wahl" (1974)
- "Ich leb nur für Dich allein" (1974)
- "Hühnerbeinchen. Hörspiel mit vielen lustigen Liedern" (Kindermusical von Christian Anders und Kurt Vethake)" (1974)
- "Der letzte Tanz" (1975)
- "Wenn Die Liebe Dich Vergißt (1975)
- "Der Brief" (1976)
- "Nur Worte?" (1976)
- "Mädchen Namenlos" (1976)
- "Love Dreamer" (1977)
- "Tu's nicht Jenny" (1977)
- "Dann kamst du" (1977)
- "Denn ich liebe dich so sehr" (1977)
- "Tokio Girl" (1977)
- "Do You Love Me / als Archibald" (1977)
- "Lass es uns tun" (1978)
- "Endstation" (1978)
- "Verliebt in den Lehrer" (1978)
- "Ich kann dich nicht vergessen" (1978)
- "Am Strand von Las Chapas" (1978)
- "Love, das ist die Antwort" (1979)
- "Es war liebe" (1979)
- "Ruby" (1979)
- "Donnerstag, der 13. Mai" (1979)
- "Du gehst" (1980)
- "Will ich zuviel?" (1980)
- "König dieser Welt" (1980)
- "Sag ihr das ich sie liebe" (1980)
- "Was wird nach dieser Nacht" (1981)
- "Zwanzig Stunden bis Jane" (1981)
- "Gebrochenes Juwel" (1981)
- "Ein Mann zuviel" (1981)
- "Zusammen sind wir stark" (1982)
- "Ist es schon zu spät" (1982)
- "Wie leb'ich ohne dich?" (1982)
- "Hinter verschlossenen Türen" (1985)
- "Wie vom Winde verweht" (1985)
- "Zu stolz" (1985)
- "Die Mauer/The Wall" (1987)
- "Lanoo – Alive in America" (1991)
- "Der Untergang des Taro Torsay" (Musical)
- "Der Tag an dem die Erde stillstand" (2001)
- "Explosive Leidenschaft" (2006)
- "Martine"
- "Gespensterstadt 2009" (2009)
- "Ruby 2010" (2010)
- "Hinter verschlossenen Türen 2011" (2010)

== Books ==
=== Novels ===
- Gobbo. Und der Teufel singt sein Lied. Ein Sex-Psycho-Western für eine Nacht. 3-Ass-Verlag, Munich 1970
- Der Blutschrei. Hirthammer, Munich 1971
- Der Brief. Presse-Service, Zürich 1976
- Der Freigänger. Eine junge Liebe zwischen Freiheit und Strafvollzug. Schweizer Verlagshaus, Zürich 1977; 2. veränd. A. 2003, ISBN 3-8311-4312-9
- Karatemeister Steve Tender. Odyssee der Rache. Schweizer Verlagshaus, Zürich 1977

=== As "Lanoo" ===
- Lanoo: Seelen-Atem Meditation. Der Weg zur wahren Unsterblichkeit. ISBN 3-89811-532-1
- Lanoo: Der Mann, der AIDS erschuf. (2000) ISBN 3-89811-440-6
- Lanoo: Das Geheimnis der sieben Siegel. (2000) ISBN 3-89811-409-0
- Lanoo: Das illustrierte Buch des Lichts. Ursprung und Bestimmung von Mensch und Universum. (2001) ISBN 3-8311-0050-0
- Lanoo: Der wahre Bankenschwindel. Und was man dagegen tun kann. (2002) ISBN 3-8311-4045-6
- Lanoo: Der Rubel muss rollen! ISBN 3-8330-0050-3
- Lanoo: Darwin irrt! ISBN 3-937699-00-7
- Lanoo: Literarischer Rebell. (2004) ISBN 3-937699-04-X

== Filmography ==
- 1970: How Did a Nice Girl Like You Get Into This Business?
- 1970: When the Mad Aunts Arrive
- 1971: Wir hau'n den Hauswirt in die Pfanne
- 1971: Das haut den stärksten Zwilling um
- 1979: Die Brut des Bösen
- 1980: Die Todesgöttin des Liebescamps
- 1986: Death Stone
- 1991: Das Mädchen aus dem Fahrstuhl
