= Habach =

- Municipality
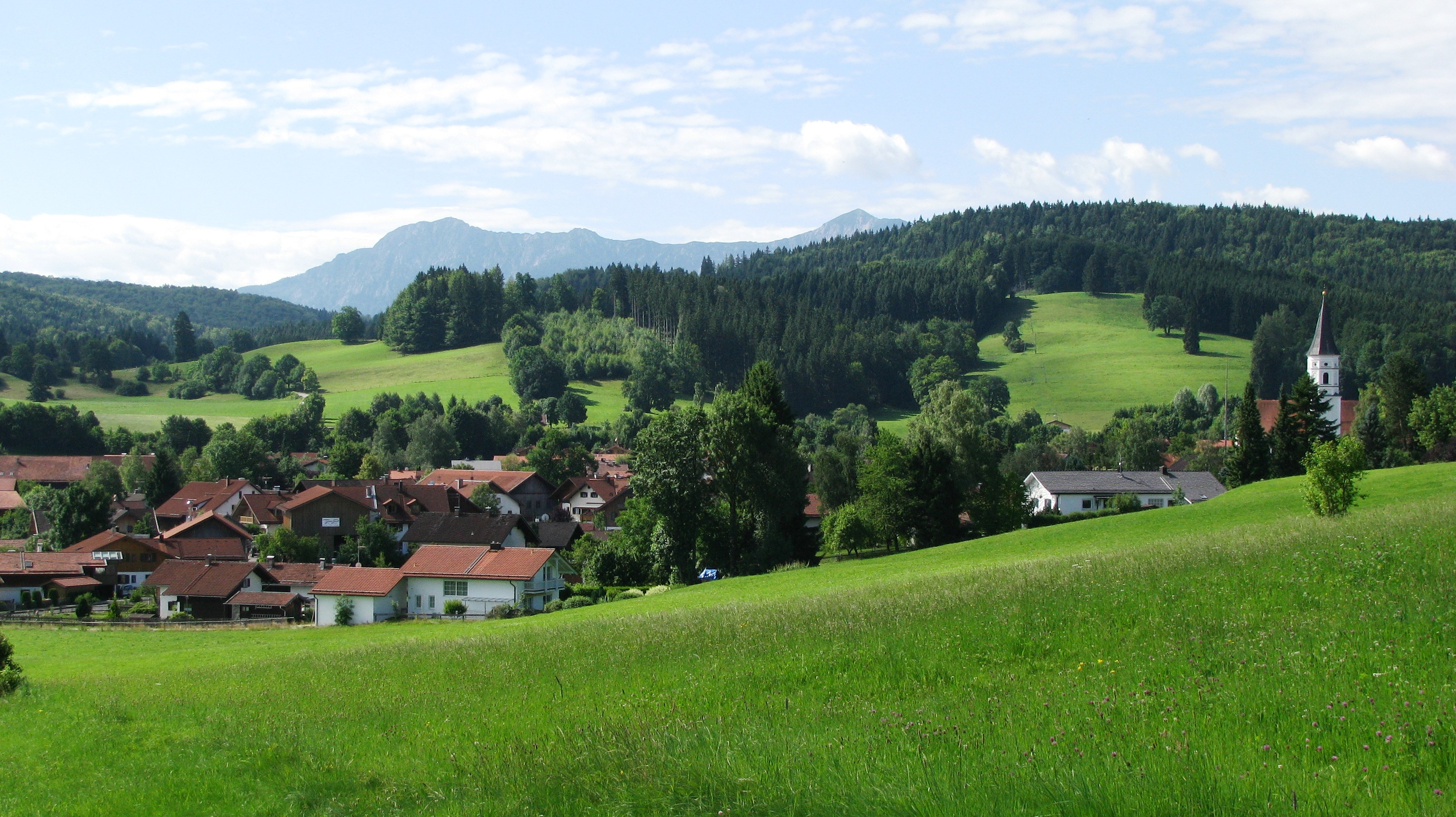
- Habach seen from the north

- Coat of arms

- Location of Habach within Weilheim-Schongau district
- Interactive map of Habach
- Location within Germany Location within Bavaria
- Coordinates: 47°44′N 11°17′E
- Country: Germany
- State: Bavaria
- Admin. region: Upper Bavaria
- District: Weilheim-Schongau
- Municipal assoc.: Habach

Government
  - Mayor (2020–26): Michael Strobl Jr.

Area
  - Total: 12.15 km^{2} (4.69 sq mi)
- Elevation: 652 m (2,139 ft)

Population (2025-12-31)
  - Total: 1,166
  - Density: 95.97/km^{2} (248.6/sq mi)
- Time zone: UTC+01:00 (CET)
  - Summer (DST): UTC+02:00 (CEST)
- Postal codes: 82392
- Dialling codes: 08847
- Vehicle registration: WM
- Website: www.habach.de

Habach (German pronunciation: [ˈhaːbax]) is a municipality in the Weilheim-Schongau district, in Bavaria, Germany.
