= Heather Thomas =

American actress (born 1957)

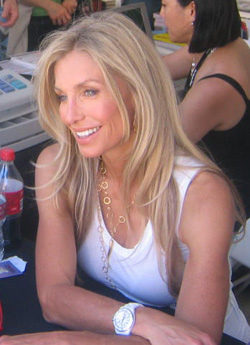
- Thomas in May 2008
- Born: September 8, 1957 (age 69)
- Occupations: Actress, author, political activist
- Years active: 1978–1998, 2013−present
- Known for: The Fall Guy
- Spouses: Allan Rosenthal (m. 1985; div. 1986); Skip Brittenham (m. 1992; died 2025)
- Children: 2

Heather Thomas (born September 8, 1957) is an American actress. She is best known for her role as Jody Banks on The Fall Guy TV series. She retired from acting in 1998 to avoid stalkers, to focus on her family, and to pursue writing. Since her retirement from acting, she has had some minor film appearances and has participated in political activism. She returned to acting in 2013.

== Career ==
Thomas started acting at age 14, when she was one of the hosts of a series on NBC called Talking with a Giant, in which she interviewed celebrities. In 1978, she began acting in small television roles; she appeared in the series Co-Ed Fever, of which she later said, "It was cancelled after the third commercial."

After Co-Ed Fever's cancellation, Thomas was chosen for the role of Jody Banks in The Fall Guy, which starred Lee Majors and was produced by Glen Larson, from its 1981 premiere to its 1986 cancellation. Thomas became addicted to cocaine during her run in the program, and entered rehabilitation for that addiction in the mid-1980s. She appeared in several movies, the first of which was Zapped! in 1982, but she gave up acting in 1998. Thomas appeared on numerous pin-up posters during the 1980s.

Following her acting career, Thomas wrote a screenplay called School Slut and sold it to Touchstone Pictures for a figure reported as "mid-six-figure." Touchstone did not make the film, and Thomas acquired the rights to produce it herself.

In April 2008, Thomas's first novel, Trophies, was published by William Morrow.

In 2014, Thomas temporarily came out of retirement to appear in a small role in the musical comedy Girltrash: All Night Long.

Thomas along with The Fall Guy costar Lee Majors, made an after-credits cameo in a scene entitled "Previously On The Fall Guy" for the 2024 movie, The Fall Guy.

== Personal life ==
Thomas married Allan Rosenthal in August 1985. Rosenthal is one of the founders of the twelve-step organization Cocaine Anonymous; they divorced in September 1986. In that same month, Thomas was struck by a car while crossing San Vicente Boulevard and sustained serious injuries to both of her legs. In October 1992, Thomas married entertainment attorney Harry Marcus "Skip" Brittenham. Their daughter was born on June 19, 2000. Skip Brittenham died on July 17, 2025, at age 83.

Thomas left acting in part due to being harassed by stalkers, as well as a desire to focus on her family and to explore writing. Thomas was once asked by Reuters in 2009, "Was it really so bad in the 1980s that you had to quit?" Thomas replied, "Yes, I was getting so stalked. I had one guy climb over the fence with a knife one time. I had these two little girls and they desperately needed raising, so that was that. But I think now I have gotten so old that people won't bother me much."

== Activism ==
Thomas and Brittenham became joint hosts of a monthly fund-raising breakfast gathering at their home in Santa Monica, California, which became known in Washington as the "L.A. Cafe". Thomas has served on the advisory boards of the Rape Foundation and Amazon Conservation Team.

== Filmography ==
Film
Year	Film	Role	Notes
1982	Zapped!	Jane Mitchell	
1987	Cyclone	Teri Marshall	
1987	Kiss of the Cobra	Merryl Davis	Alternative titles: Death Stone; Der Stein des Todes
1990	Red Blooded American Girl	Paula Bukowsky	
1993	Hidden Obsession	Ellen Carlyle	
1997	Against the Law	Felicity	
1998	My Giant	Showgirl	
2014	Girltrash: All Night Long	Nadine Robson	
2024	The Fall Guy	Jody Banks	End credits cameo with Lee Majors
Television
Year	Title	Role	Notes
1978	David Cassidy: Man Undercover	Caryl Manning	1 episode
1979	Co-Ed Fever	Sandi	1 episode
1979	California Fever	Joanne	1 episode
1980	B. J. and the Bear	Caroline Capote	1 episode
1980	The Misadventures of Sheriff Lobo	Caroline Capote	1 episode
1981–1986	The Fall Guy	Jody Banks	Main cast
1983	The Love Boat	Sheila	2 episodes
1984	T. J. Hooker	Sandy	1 episode
1984	Cover Up	Amber	1 episode
1987	The New Mike Hammer	Andrea	1 episode
1987	Ford: The Man and the Machine	Evangeline Cote	Television movie Nominated: Gemini Award for Best Performance by a Supporting Actress
1987	Hoover vs. The Kennedys: The Second Civil War	Marilyn Monroe	Television movie
1988	The Dirty Dozen: The Fatal Mission	Lieutenant Carol Campbell	Television movie
1989	Rodney Dangerfield: Opening Night at Rodney's Place	Joan Emery	Television movie
1990	Flair	Tessa Clarke	Miniseries
1991	P.S. I Luv U	Mary Markham	1 episode
1992	Swamp Thing: The Series	Tatania	1 episode
1995	Pointman	Lynn Forbes	1 episode
