= Kong Island =

1968 Italian adventure film

- Italian theatrical release poster
- Directed by: Roberto Mauri
- Written by: Walter Brandi; Ralph Zucker; Roberto Mauri
- Produced by: Walter Brandi; Ralph Zucker; Dick Randall; Brad Harris
- Starring: Brad Harris; Esmeralda Barros; Marc Lawrence
- Cinematography: Mario Mancini
- Edited by: Nella Nannuzzi
- Music by: Roberto Pregadio
- Distributed by: Better Television Distribution
- Release date: 29 September 1968
- Running time: 92 min
- Country: Italy
- Language: Italian

Kong Island (original Italian title: Eva, la Venere selvaggia; translated as Eva, the Savage Venus) is a 1968 jungle adventure film (with a science fiction element) directed by Roberto Mauri (billed as Robert Morris). The film was promoted in the U.S. as King of Kong Island.

== Plot synopsis ==
The story takes place in the jungles of Kenya and its capital city Nairobi. Despite the English-language title, there is no island (and no "Kong"). Mad scientist Albert Muller is experimenting with small radio transmitters implanted in the brains of gorillas that control their minds. These are test subjects with the ultimate goal of doing this to humans.

Diana, the daughter of bar owner Theodore (no last name is mentioned), is abducted by gorillas. Burt also has a personal motive---he was shot and left for dead by an ex-partner who he suspects is behind the situation. Hostile natives attack his group, and Burt is captured along the way. After he escapes, Burt meets a legendary white jungle girl the natives call the Sacred Monkey (In the English dubbed version, he first calls her Eve, but later everyone refers to her as Eva).

Eva is a Tarzan-like orphan who grew up alone in the jungle. She wears only a leather loincloth, and her waist-length black hair covers her breasts. She does not speak English but can communicate with animals and has a pet chimpanzee. She has one of Diana's bracelets and eventually leads Burt to a cave where she is being held prisoner by Muller. This is where the final conflict and resolution takes place---a rather convoluted mess that leaves Burt and Diana as the only survivors.

Unlike virtually every other film which features a jungle girl character, this story concentrates on Burt and his love interest Diana, with Eva confined to a marginal supporting role.

This film, though the name is very closely related to a very popular movie franchise, is not related in any form to King Kong. It is a translation of an Italian film Eva, la Venere Selvaggia, which translates as Eve the Savage Venus, leading to the alternate English-language title Eve the Wild Woman. This gives a better approximation of the film being closer one of the female Tarzan copies such as The Perils of Nyoka (1942) or tv’s Sheena, Queen of the Jungle (1955-6).

== Cast ==
- Brad Harris as Burt Dawson
- Esmeralda Barros as Eve
- Marc Lawrence as Albert Muller
- Ursula Davis as Diana
- Adriana Alben as Ursula
- Marc Fiorini (credited as Mark Farran) as Robert
- Aldo Cecconi as Theodore (credited as Jim Clay)
- Paolo Magalotti as Turk (credited as Paul Carter)
- Mario Donatone as Forrester
- Gianni Pulone
- Miles Mason as Malik The Gorilla

== Legacy ==
Contrary to popular belief, this film has nothing to do with King Kong and does not take place on an island. The film is in the public domain.

== See also ==
- List of films in the public domain in the United States
