= Superbug (film series) =

Series of German children's films released in the 1970s

- Starring: Robert Mark (2-4)
- Edited by: Silvia Müller-Gregor (2); Sigrid Weidner, Eva Zeym (3); Waltraud Maass (5)
- Music by: Hans Hammerschmid, Roman Kwiatkowski (1); Jürgen Elert (2); Peter Weiner (3-5); Gerhard Heinz (4)
- Production company: Barbara-Film GmbH
- Distributed by: Gloria Film (1); Constantin Film (2-4); C. Schmidt/Ring Film Verleih (5)
- Country: West Germany
- Language: German

Superbug is a West German children's comedy film series released between 1971 and 1978, each concerning the adventures of a sentient Volkswagen Beetle and his driver companion. The eponymous film series, and its protagonist, is essentially similar to Disney's Herbie the Love Bug franchise which also concerned the exploits of a seemingly intelligent car, but unlike Herbie which uses magic to show off anthropomorphism, the Superbug instead uses modern technology to display signs of sentience. The Superbug series appeared to be an attempt by director and main actor Rudolf Zehetgruber to bring the "Love Bug" concept to Germany, where the Beetle originated, while giving it the flair of James Bond's gadget-equipped vehicles. The main human character is named Jimmy Bondi. In the first film, which is mainly set in Africa, Bondi inherits a yellow 1963 (1963 in the first film, 1970 in Return of Superbug and 1968 in Superbug, Super Agent) VW Beetle, which he names "Dudu" (pronounced doo doo as said in the first film's English dub, Superbug Goes Wild), the Swahili word for insect or beetle.

The films were dubbed into English and first shown on Saturday and Sunday matinées in theaters in the late 1970s, then on various American UHF TV channels in the 1980s and 1990s. They have since been released on VHS and DVD.

== Movies ==
- Superbug Goes Wild (original title: Ein Käfer geht aufs Ganze ["A Beetle Goes All Out"], 1971)
- Superbug, Super Agent (original title: Ein Käfer gibt Vollgas ["A Beetle Goes Full Throttle"], 1972)
- Superbug Rides Again (original title: Ein Käfer auf Extratour ["A Beetle Takes A Ride"], 1973)
- The Maddest Car in the World (original title: Das verrückteste Auto der Welt ["The Craziest Car in the World"], 1975)
- Return of Superbug (original title: Zwei tolle Käfer räumen auf ["Two Awesome Beetles Clean Up"], 1978)

== Background ==
The model for the titular Superbug was Herbie from the Disney film franchise that started in 1968. The main difference between the two vehicles is that Herbie is portrayed as a magical Volkswagen in white racing livery, while in most of the Superbug movies, the Superbug is a computerized plain yellow Beetle with some elements of artificial intelligence. Some of the titles of the Superbug films were related to Herbie film titles, such as Superbug Rides Again being inspired by Herbie Rides Again.

Superbug is portrayed as having countless gadgets and skills. The technological aspects of the Superbug increase as the film series progresses. In the first film, Superbug Goes Wild, the car is still far from being a self-aware high-tech vehicle. In some scenes, it has animated eyes and can speak and cry, thus appealing to children. The popularity of the VW Beetle had plummeted in the mid-1970s and production was discontinued in Germany in 1978. In the final film of the series made in the same year, Return of Superbug, the Beetle body shell was merely hiding a small 6-wheel amphibious All Terrain Vehicle that interacted with a small crab-like robot named Picho, both with big eye-like headlights.

Director Rudolf Zehetgruber was also the main actor, under various names, while his Poland-born wife appeared as Kathrin Oginski. However, the films do not use his own voice, but rather dubbed the voices of actors Fred Maire or Klaus Kindler.

The Superbug series was relatively low-budget. However, some well-known German and international actors took part, including Walter Giller, Heinz Reincke, and Joachim Fuchsberger, Kurt Jaggberg, and Walter Roderer.

In September 2006, all five Superbug films were released by Kinowelt on a five-set DVD "Dudu Edition".

== Sources ==
- Michael Wenk: Walter Roderer - A Life in Pictures . Huber & Co. AG, Women 's Field 2007
