= Death Trip (1967 film) =

1967 film

- Directed by: Rudolf Zehetgruber; Gianfranco Parolini
- Screenplay by: Rudolf Zehetgruber; Theo Maria Werner; Gianfranco Parolini
- Produced by: Theo Maria Werner
- Starring: Tony Kendall; Brad Harris; Olly Schoberova; Christa Linder
- Cinematography: Baldi Schwarze
- Edited by: Edmondo Lozzi
- Production company: Parnass-Film GmbH; Chinesecolo French Film Counter
- Distributed by: Constantin Film
- Release dates: March 15, 1967 (Paris); April 7, 1967 (Germany)
- Running time: 93 minutes
- Countries: West Germany; Italy; France

Death Trip (German: Kommissar X: Drei grüne Hunde) is a 1967 Eurospy film written, co-produced and co-directed by Rudolf Zehetgruber and Gianfranco Parolini. It was a West German-Italian-French co-production with further co-producers in Lebanon and Hungary. Filmed in Turkey, it stars Tony Kendall and Brad Harris. It is the fourth of seven films, loosely based on the Kommissar X detective novel series from the Pabel Moewig publishing house.

== Plot ==
New York Police Department Captain Rowland travels to Istanbul to deliver a shipment of LSD to be used by the American armed forces stationed in Turkey for undisclosed purposes. When the shipment is stolen by a local and ancient criminal organisation known as "the Green Hounds", Rowland teams up with private eye Joe Walker to recover the shipment.

== Cast ==
- Tony Kendall as Joe Louis Walker, aka Kommissar X
- Brad Harris as Captain Rowland
- Olly Schoberova as Leyla Kessler
- Christa Linder as Gisela
- Dietmar Schonherr as Allan Hood / George Hood
- Herbert Fux as Eddie Shapiro
- Sabine Sun as Joyce Sellers
- Rossela Bergamonti as Jenny Carter
- Emilio Carrer as Inspector Rebat
- Carlo Tamberlani as Konsul Snyder
- Rolf Zehett as Almann
- Andrea Aureli as Sergeant Özkan
- Samson Burke as Khemal

== Production ==
It was a West German-Italian-French co-production with further co-producers in Lebanon and Hungary. Filmed in Turkey, it stars Tony Kendall and Brad Harris. It is the fourth of seven films, loosely based on the Kommissar X novels from the Pabel Moewig publishing house.

== Release ==
Death Trip was released in Paris, France as Chasse à l'homme à Ceylan on March 15, 1967. This was followed by screening in Germany on April 7, 1967.

It was released on home video in the United States as Death Trip.
