= Kiss Kiss, Kill Kill =

1966 film

Kommissar X: Jagd auf Unbekannt
- Directed by: Gianfranco Parolini
- Screenplay by: Giovanni Simonelli; Gianfranco Parolini; Theo Maria Werner
- Produced by: Hans Pfluger; Theo Maria Werner; Mario Siciliano
- Starring: Tony Kendall; Brad Harris; Maria Perschy; Christa Linder
- Cinematography: Francesco Izzrelli
- Edited by: Edmond Lozzi
- Music by: Mladen Gutesha
- Production companies: Parnass-Film GmbH; Metheus Film
- Release date: 11 March 1966
- Running time: 92 minutes
- Countries: West Germany; Italy
- Languages: Italian; German

Kiss Kiss, Kill Kill (German: Kommissar X – Jagd auf Unbekannt, Italian: 12 donne d'oro, also known as Hunting The Unknown and Kiss Kiss... Kill Kill) is a Eurospy film written and directed by Gianfranco Parolini who also wrote lyrics for the Joe Walker Theme. The film stars Tony Kendall and Brad Harris. It is the first of seven films, loosely based on the 1960 Kommissar X #73 detective novel from the Pabel Moewig publishing house.

In the film, a vacationing private investigator is hired to locate a nuclear scientist. His intended contact is killed before she can provide further information on the mission. A man using the name Oberon informs the investigator that he is the next target in a series of murders, but he has his own hidden agenda.

== Plot ==
American private investigator Joe Walker is on vacation in Europe when he is approached by a mysterious woman who is looking for a nuclear scientist named Bob Carroll. The woman gives Walker $3,000 and the name of a contact who has more information, then disappears as she is afraid for her own life. Meanwhile NYPD Captain Tom Rowland is assisting the local police investigating the deaths of two businessmen in separate bombings.

Walker arranges to meet the contact, Nancy Wright, but she is killed before they can talk. Another woman, Bobo, arrives at Walker's hotel room, but is later found dead there. A man named Oberon invites Walker to his home and explains that he, the two dead men and another man, Henry Mail, were co-owners of a business. Oberon implicates Mail as the killer of the two other men, and claims he will be the next victim. Oberon then fakes his own death in an attack on his mansion.

Oberon lures Henry Mail and his wife aboard his yacht and has them killed. Later Walker and Rowland search the boat and find a clue that implicates Oberon. Walker enters Oberon's home and discovers a secret lair beneath the house, but is captured by Oberon's brainwashed female guards and taken to his private island via an underground tunnel.

At his island base, Oberon reveals his scheme. He and his business partners secretly amassed a stockpile of gold but, to protect their investment, his partners had the gold irradiated. Oberon used scientist Bob Carroll to devise a way to decontaminate the gold, but Carroll became seriously ill after being exposed to the radiation. Oberon's secretary Joan reveals herself as the woman who hired Walker, and that she is Carroll's sister.

Oberon orders that Joan be drugged to become like the other women of his army, but she escapes rescues Walker. As Rowland makes his way to the island, Walker seduces Oberon's doctor and they free the female guards. Walker and Rowland confront Oberon, who falls into a chemical tank and dies. They escape as Oberon's base is blown up by a self-destruct mechanism.

== Cast ==
- Tony Kendall as Jo Louis Walker, aka Kommissar X
- Brad Harris as Captain Tom Rowland
- Maria Perschy as Joan Smith
- Christa Linder as Pamela Hudson
- Nikola Popović as Oberon
- Ingrid Lotarius as Oberon's Henchwoman
- Giuseppe Mattei as Kan
- Jacques Bézard as Captain Olsen
- Olivera Katarina as Bobo
- Danielle Godet as Pat

== Release ==
Komissar X: Jagd auf Unbekannt was released on 11 March 1966. In Italy, it is known as 12 donne d'oro.
