= Spy Today, Die Tomorrow =

1967 film

- Directed by: Franz Josef Gottlieb
- Written by: Franz Josef Gottlieb
- Starring: Lex Barker; Maria Perschy; Amedeo Nazzari
- Cinematography: Siegfried Hold
- Music by: Armando Trovajoli; Gianni Marchetti
- Release dates: 11 August 1967 (Italy); 18 August 1967 (West Germany); 2 June 1969 (Barcelona); 3 August 1970 (Madrid)
- Language: German

Spy Today, Die Tomorrow (German: Mister Dynamit – Morgen küßt euch der Tod, Italian: Muori lentamente... te la godi di più, Spanish: Mister Dinamita, mañana os besará la muerte, also known as Die Slowly, You'll Enjoy It More) is a 1967 West German-Italian-Spanish Eurospy film written and directed by Franz Josef Gottlieb and starring Lex Barker.

Millionaire Baretti pays a gang to rob an atomic bomb from an American silo, and then blackmails the USA Government for a huge amount of money. German secret service (BND) agent 'Dynamite' will use his fists, guns and more in a violent bomb chase. In the end, Barelli's accomplices are dead or arrested, but he escapes unharmed, while Mr. Dynamite spends time in a Mediterranean resort with a lovely woman.

== Cast ==
- Lex Barker as Bob Urban / Mr. Dynamit
- Maria Perschy as Lu Forrester
- Amedeo Nazzari as Bardo Baretti
- Ullrich Haupt as General Forman
- Wolfgang Preiss as BND-Chef Sebastian
- Ralf Wolter as Spiegel
- Siegfried Rauch as Tazzio
- Dieter Eppler as Captain Reichel
- Eddi Arent as Prof. Strahlmann
- Brad Harris as Cliff
- Gustavo Rojo as Peppino
- Charles Fawcett as General Stikker
- Joachim Fuchsberger as Militärpolizist (Cameo)
