= Kommissar X =

Joe Louis Walker
- Created by: Bert F. Island
- Portrayed by: Tony Kendall

In-universe information
- Alias: Kommissar X
- Gender: Male
- Occupation: Private detective
- Nationality: American

Kommissar X or Commissioner X is a German crime fiction series of books from the Pabel Moewig publishing house. "Kommissar X" is a private detective named Joe Louis Walker who was a counterpart of the German crime fiction FBI Special Agent Jerry Cotton. In addition to the vast collection of books, between 1965 and 1971 seven Kommissar X films were made with Tony Kendall as the laid back swinging New York City private eye Joe Walker balanced against the serious muscular New York City Police Captain Tom Rowland played by Brad Harris.

== Beginnings ==
The Kommissar X series of crime novels were written by Bert F. Island whose real name was Paul Alfred Mueller (18 October 1901 – 1 January 1970). Beginning in 1959, Island wrote 620 "Kommissar X" books.

== Films ==
With the international success of the films of Ian Fleming's James Bond and the German Jerry Cotton (played by George Nader) series, seven Commissioner X films, mostly written and directed by Gianfranco Parolini and starring Tony Kendall as private detective Joe Walker and Brad Harris as New York City Police Lieutenant Tom Rowland, were made. These films were not only released internationally, but became a staple of American television movies in the mid-1960s when American stations sought colour films to show.

The films were

- 1966: Kommissar X – Jagd auf Unbekannt - Hunt for the Unknown a.k.a. Kiss Kiss Kill Kill
- 1966: Kommissar X – Drei gelbe Katzen - Three Yellow Cats a.k.a. Death is Nimble, Death is Quick
- 1966: Kommissar X – In den Klauen des goldenen Drachen - So Darling, So Deadly
- 1967: Kommissar X – Drei grüne Hunde - Death Trip
- 1968: Kommissar X – Drei blaue Panther - Three Blue Panthers a.k.a. Kill Panther Kill
- 1969: Kommissar X – Drei goldene Schlangen - Three Golden Serpents a.k.a. Island of Lost Girls
- 1971: Kommissar X jagt die roten Tiger - FBI: Operation Pakistan a.k.a. Tiger Gang

== DVD release ==
The first three Kommissar X films have been released in the United States but in the same faded and English dubbed versions that were on American television in the 1960s. Remastered versions of the first six films were released in Germany, which include the English dub.

== In popular culture ==
In 2012 a German comedy directed by Reginald Ginster titled Die X-Männer schlagen zurück featured Harris, Kendall and Parolini.
