= Obersöchering =

- Municipality
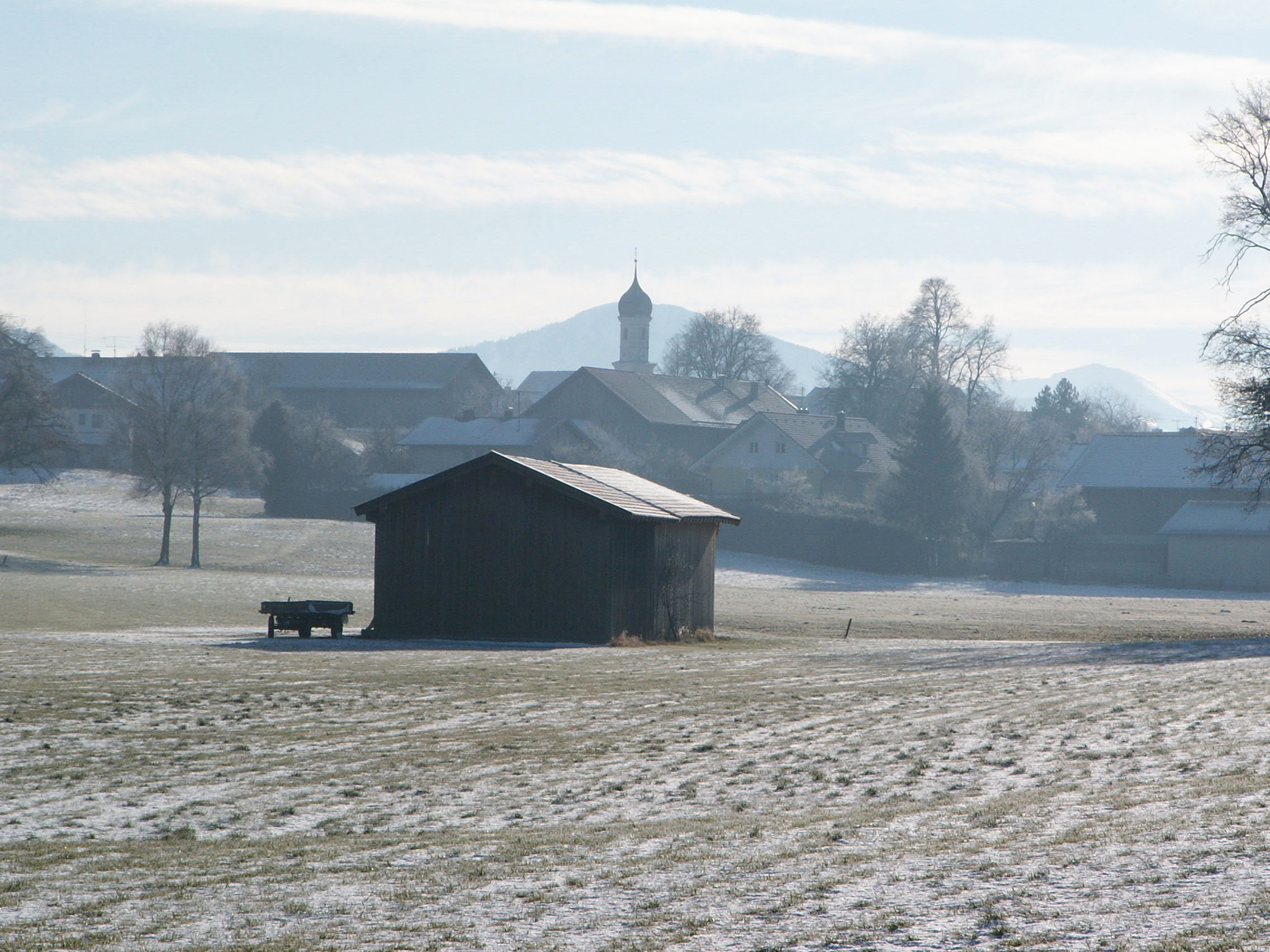
- Obersöchering seen from the northwest on a winter morning

- Coat of arms

- Location of Obersöchering within Weilheim-Schongau district
- Interactive map of Obersöchering
- Location within Germany Location within Bavaria
- Coordinates: 47°44′N 11°13′E
- Country: Germany
- State: Bavaria
- Admin. region: Oberbayern
- District: Weilheim-Schongau
- Municipal assoc.: Habach

Government
  - Mayor (2020–26): Reinald Huber

Area
  - Total: 24.27 km^{2} (9.37 sq mi)
- Elevation: 665 m (2,182 ft)

Population (2025-12-31)
  - Total: 1,563
  - Density: 64.40/km^{2} (166.8/sq mi)
- Time zone: UTC+01:00 (CET)
  - Summer (DST): UTC+02:00 (CEST)
- Postal codes: 82395
- Dialling codes: 08847
- Vehicle registration: WM
- Website: www.obersoechering.de

Obersöchering is a municipality in the Weilheim-Schongau district, in Bavaria, Germany.
