= Paul Ziffren =

American lawyer and sports administrator

- Born: July 18, 1913; Davenport, Iowa, U.S.
- Died: May 31, 1991 (aged 77); Malibu, California, U.S.
- Education: Northwestern University Pritzker School of Law
- Occupations: Lawyer; sports administrator
- Spouses: Phyllis Kolinsky (m. 1937; div. 1948); Muriel Ritzenberg (m. 1948)
- Children: 3; including Ken

Paul Abraham Ziffren (July 18, 1913 – May 31, 1991) was an American lawyer and sports administrator.

== Education ==
Ziffren graduated from Davenport High School and the Northwestern University School of Law.

== Career ==
Ziffren practiced law in Chicago, where he also served as an assistant counsel to the Internal Revenue Service and assistant U.S. attorney in charge of the tax division. He moved to Southern California in 1943 and became a leading Beverly Hills tax attorney.

In 1960, Ziffren chaired the Democratic National Committee.

In 1984, he was the chairman of the board of Summer Olympics. For his contributions to sports, he was inducted in the International Jewish Sports Hall of Fame.

He was a longtime business associate of Sidney Korshak.

== Personal life ==
On December 26, 1937, Ziffren married law school classmate Phyllis Kolinsky in San Francisco. A native of Denver, she was known later in life as Phyllis Deutsch or Phyllis Owensmith. The couple had a son, Ken (born 1940), and a daughter, Abbie (1942–1997).

Ziffren and Kolinsky divorced on April 30, 1948. Less than three weeks later on May 20, he married the former Muriel Averett, known as Mickey, in Philadelphia. They remained married until his death and had one son together, John (born 1956). Ziffren was also a stepfather to Averett's daughter Toni (1941–2017), from her previous marriage to Milton Ritzenberg.

== Death ==
Ziffren died of congestive heart failure at his Malibu home on May 31, 1991.
