= Kommissar X – In den Klauen des goldenen Drachen =

- Directed by: Gianfranco Parolini
- Screenplay by: Stefan Gommermann; Gianfranco Parolini; Theo Maria Werner
- Starring: Tony Kendall; Brad Harris; Barbara Frey; Luisa Rivelli
- Cinematography: Emilio Varriano; Sandro Mancori; Boza Miletić
- Edited by: Edmond Lozzi
- Music by: Mladen Gutesha
- Production companies: Parnass-Film GmbH; Cinesecolo; Cathay-Keris Films; Avala Film
- Release date: 30 September 1966 (West Germany)
- Running time: 84 minutes
- Countries: West Germany; Italy; Yugoslavia; Singapore
- Languages: Italian; German

Kommissar X – In den Klauen des goldenen Drachen (In the Claws of the Golden Dragon) (English title:So Darling So Deadly) is a 1966 Eurospy film co-written and directed by Gianfranco Parolini and starring Tony Kendall and Brad Harris. It is the third of seven films, loosely based on the Kommissar X detective novels from the Pabel Moewig publishing house.

The setting of the film is Singapore. Interpol tasks two American operatives to protect a local inventor from a criminal mastermind who wants to obtain the inventor's method for improving laser weapons.

== Plot ==
Professor Akron is an inventor based in Singapore who creates the Eradicon; a jewel-like filter for a laser weapon that dramatically improves its power and range as well as the ability to stop engines over long distances. Akron is given three days to accept a "blank cheque" from a criminal mastermind known as the Golden Dragon, but he contacts Interpol who arrange to send New York private detective Joe Walker and New York Police Captain Tom Rowland to Singapore to protect the professor, his attractive daughter and the Eradicon.

== Cast ==
- Tony Kendall as Joe Walker, aka Kommissar X
- Brad Harris as Captain Tom Rowland
- Barbara Frey as Sybille Akron
- Luisa Rivelli as Shabana
- Ernst Fritz Fürbringer as Professor Akron
- Gisela Hahn as Stella
- Margaret Rose Keil as Selena
- Jacques Bézard as Charly
- Giuseppe Matte as Benny
- Carlo Tamberlani as Jonathan Taylor
- Nikola Popovic as Li Hu Wang
- H. Amin as Takato
- Gianfranco Parolini as Rex (as Frank Littleword)
