= Kommissar X – Drei gelbe Katzen =

- Italian film poster
- Directed by: Gianfranco Parolini; Rudolf Zehetgruber
- Screenplay by: Mike Ashley; Rudolf Zehetgruber
- Starring: Tony Kendall
- Cinematography: Klaus von Rautenfeld
- Edited by: Edmond Lozzi; René Henaf
- Music by: Gino Marinucci Jr.
- Production companies: Parnass-Film GmbH; Danny Film; Filmédis S.A.; Jacques Willemetz; Danubiafilm GmbH & Co. KG
- Distributed by: Gaumont Distribution
- Release date: May 17, 1966 (Austria)
- Running time: 100 minutes
- Countries: West Germany; Italy; France; Austria
- Languages: Italian; German

Kommissar X – Drei gelbe Katzen is a 1966 Eurospy film written and co-directed by Rudolf Zehetgruber and Gianfranco Parolini. Filmed in Ceylon, it stars Tony Kendall, Brad Harris and Dan Vadis with Harris and Vadis doing their own stuntwork. It is the second of seven films, loosely based on the 1961 Kommissar X #73 detective novel from the Pabel Moewig publishing house, though the original novel was set in Burma.

In the film, an American police officer and a private investigator arrive in Colombo to protect a family of landowners from mysterious enemies. They are informed that the actual enemy is a cat-themed terrorist organization.

== Plot ==
Tom Rowland from the New York Police Department is sent to Colombo to investigate the murder of a US embassy official killed protecting the daughter of a wealthy expatriate American landowner. At the same time New York Private Investigator Joe Walker has been hired by the landowner's daughter to protect her father from being extorted for one million dollars. Through the Ceylon Police they discover a terrorist organisation known as the Three Golden Cats are responsible for both activities and a string of murders with the victims killed by karate blows or by biological chemicals.

== Cast ==
- Tony Kendall ... Joe Louis Walker, aka Kommissar X
- Brad Harris ... Captain Tom Rowland
- Ann Smyrner ... Babs Lincoln
- Michèle Mahaut... Michèle
- Dan Vadis ... King
- Siegfried Rauch ... Nitro
- H.D. Kulatunga ... Sunny
- Philippe Lemaire ... Philip Dawson
- Erno Crisa ... Baker
- Rudolf Zehetgruber (as Rolf Zehett) ... Barrett
- A. Jayaratii ... Insp. DaSilva
- Theo Maria Werner (as Werner Hauff) ... Geldbote
- Paul Beckmann ... Rogers
- Chandrika 'Champa' Liyanage ... Photographer
- Ananda Jayaratne ... Police Chief inspector
- Joe Abeywickrama ... Police constable

== Release ==
Kommissar X – Drei gelbe Katzen was released in Austria on 17 May 1966.
