= Kommissar X – Drei goldene Schlangen =

1969 film by Roberto Mauri

- Directed by: Roberto Mauri
- Screenplay by: Manfred R. Köhler; Paul Alfred Müller; Frank Kramer
- Produced by: Theo Maria Werner; Ralph Zucker
- Starring: Tony Kendall; Brad Harris; Loni Heuser
- Cinematography: Francesco Izzarelli
- Music by: Francesco de Masi
- Production companies: Parnass-Film GmbH; Terra-Filmkunst GmbH; G.I.A. Cinematografica
- Release date: 18 April 1969
- Running time: 89 minutes
- Countries: West Germany; Italy
- Languages: Italian; German

Kommissar X – Drei goldene Schlangen (translation: Commissioner X: Three Golden Snakes) is a 1969 Eurospy film directed by Roberto Mauri and starring Tony Kendall and Brad Harris that was shot in Thailand. It is the sixth of seven films, loosely based on the Kommissar X detective novels from the Pabel Moewig publishing house.

== Plot ==
While sightseeing in Bangkok, Phyllis Leighton, a young American girl, is kidnapped by white slavers. Her mother approaches New York Police Captain Tom Rowland who is attending a conference in Bangkok. With little for the police to go on, Phyllis's frantic mother Maud telephones private eye Joe Walker in New York, asking him to come to Bangkok to find her daughter.

Phyllis finds herself on an island with other kidnapped women who are being forced into prostitution. Soon after Joe Walker's arrival both he and Tom are subject to a multitude of assassination attempts by flame thrower, blowgun and poison gas. Their only clue is that each of the dead unsuccessful assassins have a tattoo of three golden serpents.

== Cast ==
- Tony Kendall as Joe Walker / Kommissar X
- Brad Harris as Captain Tom Rowland
- Hansi Linder as Phyllis Leighton
- Walter Brandi as Landru
- Monica Pardo as Kathin Russell
- Loni Heuser as Maud Leighton
- Vilaiwan Vatanapanich as Madame Kim Soh
- Herbert Fux as Killer #1
- Giuseppe Mattei as Killer #2

== Release ==
Kommissar X – Drei goldene Schlangen was released on 18 April 1969.
