= 08/15 (film series) =

- German Poster
- Directed by: Paul May
- Written by: Paul May; Hans Hellmut Kirst; Claus Hardt; Ernst von Salomon
- Based on: 08/15 by Hans Hellmut Kirst
- Produced by: Ilse Kubaschewski
- Cinematography: Heinz Hölscher
- Edited by: Walter Boos; Arnfried Heyne
- Music by: Rolf A. Wilhelm
- Production company: Divina-Film
- Distributed by: Gloria Filmverleih AG
- Country: West Germany
- Language: German

08/15 is a 1954–55 West German film trilogy directed by Paul May and based on the novel 08/15 by Hans Hellmut Kirst who also served as the film's screenwriter (published in English as "The Revolt of Gunner Asch"). The term 08/15 (nill-eight/fifteen, German: Null-Acht/Fünfzehn) refers to the German Army's standard machine gun, the 08/15 (or MG 08 model 15), by far, the most common German machine gun deployed in World War I. It was manufactured in such large quantities that it became the German Army slang for anything that was standard issue.

The film follows the story of Private Asch, a German soldier in World War II. The film title implies that Asch, and the soldiers under his command, were unostentatious (i.e. "run-of-the-mill") characters deployed on the Eastern Front.

== Premise ==
The last of the 08/15 film trilogy ends with Germany being occupied by American soldiers who are portrayed as bubble-gum chewing, slack-jawed, uncultured louts, inferior in every respect to the heroic German soldiers. The only exception is the Jewish emigrant, now a US officer, who is shown as both intelligent and unscrupulous, the fact interpreted by Professor Omer Bartov as implying that the "real tragedy of World War II was that the Nazis did not get a chance to exterminate all Semites, who have now returned with Germany's defeat to once more exploit the German people". "Although Asch is never identified with the Americans – indeed, in the final film of the trilogy, the Americans appear to be nearly as dangerous a foe as the SS."

== Parts ==
- Part 1: In der Kaserne (In the Barracks)
- Part 2: Im Krieg (In War)
- Part 3: In der Heimat (Back Home)

== Cast ==
Actor	08/15	08/15: Zweiter Teil	08/15 in der Heimat
Wilfried Seyferth	Luschke		
Harry Hardt	Derna		
Heinz-Peter Scholz	Dr. Sämig		
Rainer Penkert	Wedelmann	Wedelmann	
Emmerich Schrenk	Fritz Schulz	Fritz Schulz	Fritz Schulz
Hans-Christian Blech	Platzek	Platzek	Platzek
Hans Elwenspoek	Werktreu	Werktreu	
Reinhard Glemnitz	Lindenberg		
Rudolf Rhomberg	Rumpler		
Wolfgang Wahl	Schwitzke		
Dietrich Thoms	Wunderlich		Schirrmeister
Joachim Fuchsberger	Herbert Asch	Herbert Asch	Herbert Asch
Peter Carsten	Kowalski	Kowalski	Kowalski
Paul Bösiger	Hannes Vierbein	Hannes Vierbein	Hannes Vierbein
Helen Vita	Lore Schulz	Lore Schulz	Lore Schulz
Eva-Ingeborg Scholz	Elisabeth Freitag	Elisabeth Asch	
Gundula Korte	Ingrid Asch	Ingrid Asch	
Herbert Kroll	Freitag		Freitag
Walter Klock	Asch	Asch	Asch
Mario Adorf	Wagner	Wagner	Stamm
O. E. Hasse		von Plönnies	von Plönnies
Rolf Kutschera		Witterer	
Ellen Schwiers		Natascha	
Gitta Lind		Charlotte	
Erica Beer		Viola	
Ulla Melchinger		Lisa	
Armin Dahlen		Infanterie-Major	
Manfred Schuster		Krause	
Otto Bolesch		Unteroffizier der Abwehr	
Klaus Pohl		Winziger	
Hannes Schiel			Georg Hauk
Gustav Knuth			Hinrichsen
Michael Janisch			Greifer
Renate Ewert			Barbara Bruks
Edith Schultze-Westrum			Frau Brahm
Kurt Heintel			James
Howard Vernon			John
Arnulf Schröder			Volkssturmführer
Rudolf Rhomberg			NSDAP-Ortsgruppenleiter
Hans Friedrich			Horn
