= Russia: War, Peace and Diplomacy =

2005 essay collection book

- Editors: Mark Eerickson and Ljubica Erickson
- Published: 2005 (Weidenfeld & Nicolson)
- ISBN: 9780297849131

Russia: War, Peace and Diplomacy is a 2005 book edited by Mark Erickson and Ljubica Erickson. The book is a collection of essays from a number of renowned historians including Omer Bartov, Jürgen Förster, David Glantz, Antony Beevor, Norman Stone, Hew Strachan and Robert Service. The book was written in honour of historian John Erickson and also includes essays from his colleagues in the United Kingdom, United States and Russia. The foreword was written by Sir Michael Howard.

== Summary and analysis ==
=== Celluloid Soldiers ===
The chapter "Celluloid Soldiers" is about post World War II German films, the Israeli historian Omer Bartov wrote that German films of the 1950s showed the average German soldier as a heroic victim: noble, tough, brave, honourable and patriotic, while fighting hard in a senseless war for a regime that he did not care for. The 08/15 film trilogy of 1954–55 concerns a sensitive young German soldier named Asch (Joachim Fuchsberger). No mention is ever made of the genocidal aspects of Germany's war in the East with instead the German soldiers being shown as the victims of a war that they can not fathom the reasons for. Bartov commented that given the intense indoctrination in the Wehrmacht about how the war against the Soviet Union was a war to destroy "Judeo-Bolshevism" that Asch would most definitely have known what they were fighting for.

The war on the Eastern Front was portrayed in a manner that suggested that all who fought in the war were equally victims, but since the focus in the 08/15 films is on the unit commanded by Asch inevitably the impression is given that it was German soldiers who were the primary victims of the war. The term 08/15 refers to a type of German machine gun used in World War I that was manufactured in such quantities that "08/15" (German: Nullachtfünfzehn) became German Army slang for anything was standard issue, which implied that Asch and the soldiers under his command were Everyman characters of the war on the Eastern Front.

The last of the 08/15 films ends with Germany being occupied by a gang of American soldiers portrayed as bubble-gum chewing, slack-jawed morons and uncultured louts, totally inferior in every respect to the heroic German soldiers. The only exception is the black-marketing Jewish American officer, who is shown as both hyper-intelligent and unscrupulous, which Bartov noted seems to imply that the real tragedy of World War II was the Nazis did not get a chance to exterminate all of the Jews, who have now returned with Germany's defeat to once more exploit the German people. This is especially the case because the Jewish officer speaks his German with an upper-class accent, which is evidently meant to suggest he is a rich German Jew who fled to the United States in the 1930s and upon his return after 1945 is engaging in the same sort of black-market activities that had led the Nazis to run people like him out of Germany in the first place.

In Der Arzt von Stalingrad (The Doctor from Stalingrad) of 1958, dealing with German POWs in the Soviet Union, the Germans are portrayed as more civilized, humane and intelligent than the Soviets, who are shown for the most part as Mongol savages who brutalized the German prisoners.

One of the German POWs, the dashing Doctor Sellnow (Walter Reyer), successfully seduces the beautiful and tough Red Army Captain Alexandra Kasalniskaya (Eva Bartok), who prefers him to the sadistic and hideously deformed camp commandant Piotr Markov (Hannes Messemer), which as Bartov comments is also meant to show that even in defeat, German men were more sexually virile and potent than their Russian counterparts. This was especially important to German audiences because of the "crisis in masculinity" in Germany after the war, namely doubts about how manly German men were after losing the war. Hence the exaggerated picture German films liked to show of the typical Wehrmacht soldier as an ultra-macho type who was just as much a victorious conquering hero in the bedroom as on the battlefield.

Bartov argues the need to show German soldiers as manly war heroes meant they could never be shown as war criminals. Bartov wrote that the portrayal of the Soviet guards as mostly Asian shows disturbing affinities to war-time Nazi propaganda, where the Red Army was often described as "the Asiatic horde". A recurring theme in Der Arzt von Stalingrad was that the German soldiers were being punished for crimes that they had not committed. In the 1959 film Hunde, wolt ihr ewig leben? (Dogs, do you want to live forever?), which deals with the Battle of Stalingrad, the focus is on celebrating the heroism of the German soldiers in that battle, who are shown as valiantly holding out against overwhelming odds with no mention at all of what those soldiers were fighting for, namely National Socialist ideology or the Holocaust. Bartov noted that the clear impression that these films give is that the average German soldier who fought on the Eastern Front was a hero worthy of the highest admiration. This in turn led to a tendency to portray the war in the East in a manner that was devoid of its political context with the war being reduced to struggle between German soldiers whom the audiences were expected to like and admire vs. vast hordes of nameless, faceless, brutal Russian soldiers. In such a narrative, war crimes by the Wehrmacht had no place.

This period also saw a number of films that depicted the military resistance to Hitler. In Des Teufels General (The Devil's General) of 1954, a Luftwaffe general named Harras (Curd Jürgens), loosely modeled on Ernst Udet, appears at first to be a cynical fool whose major interests in life appear to be beautiful women and alcohol, but who turns out to a gallant and upright anti-Nazi officer who is secretly sabotaging the German war effort by designing faulty planes. General Harras, who is represented as a great German patriot has turned against the Nazi regime because of certain unspecified "abominations" which are neither shown nor explained. Bartov commented that in this film, the German officer corps is shown as a group of fundamentally noble and honourable men who happened to be serving an evil regime made up of a small gang of gangsterish misfits totally unrepresentative of German society, which served to exculpate both the officer corps and by extension German society.

This impression is further reinforced by the comic exchanges between the decent and upright Harras and various thuggish Nazis. Officers such as Harras may have served a criminal regime, but Des Teufels General seems to suggest that they were never a part of that regime. Bartov wrote that no German film of the 1950s showed the deep commitment felt by many German soldiers to National Socialism, the utterly ruthless way the German Army fought the war and the mindless nihilist brutality of the later Wehrmacht.

Bartov also wrote that German film-makers liked to show the heroic last stand of the 6th Army at Stalingrad, but none has so far showed the 6th Army's massive co-operation with the Einsatzgruppen in murdering Soviet Jews in 1941 during its march across Ukraine. Likewise, Bartov commented that German films tended to dwell on the suffering of the 6th Army during the Battle of Stalingrad and its aftermath without reflecting on the fact that it was the Germans who invaded the Soviet Union and that the Russians were fighting to defend their country. Bartov went on to state that as late as the 1991 film Mein Krieg (My War), featuring interview footage of six German veterans juxtaposed with their amateur films the veterans shot during the war, contains strong hints that the interviewees saw and/or were involved in war crimes with at one point a mass grave of civilians in Russia being glimpsed in the background of one of the amateur films; but the point is not pressed by the film-makers.

=== German military's image of Russia ===
German historian, Jürgen Förster, examined the beliefs of the German soldiers committed to the Eastern Front in his chapter. He notes one soldier remarking: "Everyone, even the last doubter knows today, that the battle against these subhumans, who've been whipped into a frenzy by the Jews, was not only necessary but came in the nick of time. Our Führer has saved Europe from certain chaos".

=== Soviet women's tractor driving in the 1930s ===
In her chapter, Professor Mary Buckley, discusses gender equality in the Soviet Union of the 1930s.

== Reviews ==
The book received reviews from Revolutionary Russia and The Russian Review, among others.

In a book review from Revolutionary Russia, it was written: "The book has a core of 7 chapters dealing with the Eastern Front during the Second World War. It is here one finds the most compelling contributions". Sergei Kushrayov's contribution discusses how 5,000 Soviet Trawniki men volunteered to become concentration camp guards for the Germans.

== Bibliography ==
- Bartov, Omer (2004). "Celluloid Soldiers". In Erickson, Mark; Erickson, Ljubica (eds.). Russia: War, Peace and Diplomacy. Weidenfeld and Nicolson. ISBN 978-0297849131.
