= The Disciplined Woman =

1972 film by Ernst Hofbauer

- Directed by: Ernst Hofbauer
- Written by: Günther Heller
- Produced by: Bernd Bergemann; Wolf C. Hartwig
- Starring: Astrid Frank
- Cinematography: Klaus Werner
- Edited by: Herbert Taschner
- Music by: Gert Wilden
- Production company: Rapid Film
- Distributed by: Constantin Film
- Release date: 22 June 1972
- Running time: 88 minutes
- Country: West Germany
- Language: German

The Disciplined Woman (German: Die dressierte Frau) is a 1972 West German comedy film directed by Ernst Hofbauer and starring Astrid Frank, Esther Konrad and Heimo van Borg.

== Cast ==
- Astrid Frank as Gudrun
- Esther Konrad
- Heimo van Borg as Achim
- Hansi Linder as Herself
- Margot Mahler as Emmi
- Rosl Mayr as Frau Kellermann
- Bernd Bergemann
- Ulrike Butz as Hanni
- Carmen Jäckel as Monika Seibold
- Monica Marc as Luise Biddinghaus
- Michael von Harbach
- Evelyne Traeger as Frl. Ullmann
- Hans Kern
- Iris Wobker
- Dietrich Kerky as Walter Herwig
- Jasmin Kompatscher
- Josef Moosholzer as Pauls Freund Otto
- Otto Storr
- Hans Terofal as Paul
- Dieter Assmann as Albrecht
- Norbert Losch
- Ruth Marcus
- Karel Otto as Albrecht's Boss
- Roman Skrobek as Otto Huber
- Anke Syring as Reporterin
- Felix Rakosi
- Claus Tinney as Mann vor Nachtclub
- Walter Buhse
- Claudia Höll as Uta Becker
- Astrid Boner as Krankenschwester
- Gernot Möhner as Horst Becker
- Jürgen Schilling as Kellner

== Bibliography ==
- Johan Daisne.Dictionnaire filmographique de la littérature mondiale, Volume 2. Storyscientia, 1975.
