= The Night of the Generals =

1967 film by Anatole Litvak

- Theatrical release poster
- Directed by: Anatole Litvak
- Screenplay by: Joseph Kessel; Paul Dehn; Gore Vidal (uncredited)
- Based on: The Night of the Generals (1962 novel) by Hans Hellmut Kirst The Wary Transgressor (1952 novel) by James Hadley Chase
- Produced by: Sam Spiegel
- Starring: Peter O'Toole; Omar Sharif; Tom Courtenay; Donald Pleasence; Joanna Pettet; Philippe Noiret
- Cinematography: Henri Decaë
- Edited by: Alan Osbiston
- Music by: Maurice Jarre
- Production companies: Horizon Pictures; Filmsonor
- Distributed by: Columbia Pictures
- Release dates: 29 January 1967 (London, premiere); 10 February 1967 (UK); 1 April 1967 (France)
- Running time: 145 minutes
- Countries: United Kingdom; France
- Language: English
- Box office: $2,400,000 (US/ Canada rentals)

The Night of the Generals is a 1967 war mystery-thriller film directed by Anatole Litvak and starring Peter O'Toole, Omar Sharif, Tom Courtenay, Donald Pleasence, Joanna Pettet, and Philippe Noiret. It is based on the 1962 novel by Hans Hellmut Kirst, about the investigation of a serial killer targeting prostitutes in German-occupied Warsaw during the Second World War. The writing credits also state the film is "based on an incident written by James Hadley Chase", referring to a subplot from Chase's 1952 novel The Wary Transgressor.

The British and French co-production premiered in London on 29 January 1967, and was distributed by Columbia Pictures. It received mixed reviews from critics.

== Plot ==
The murder of a prostitute, who was also a German agent, in German-occupied Warsaw in 1942 causes Heer Major Grau of the Wehrmacht's Abwehr to start an investigation. His evidence soon points to the killer being one of three German generals: General von Seidlitz-Gabler; Major General Kahlenberge, von Seidlitz-Gabler's chief of staff; or Heer General Tanz, a highly decorated officer and a favorite of Adolf Hitler's. Grau's investigation is cut short by his sudden promotion and transfer to Paris at the instigation of these officers.

No further developments occur in the case until July 1944, when Grau and all three of the generals are in Paris at the same time. The city is a hotbed of intrigue, with senior Wehrmacht Heer officers of the Wehrmacht plotting to assassinate Hitler and overthrow the Nazi government. Kahlenberge is deeply involved in the plot, while Gabler is aware of its existence, but sitting on the fence, awaiting the outcome whilst having various extramarital affairs, and Tanz is unaware of the plot and remains totally loyal to Hitler. General Tanz has transferred from the Wehrmacht's Heer to the SS, and is a Waffen-SS General (SS-Obergruppenführer), in command of the SS-Panzer Division Nibelungen (a fictitious stand-in for the 12th SS Panzer Division).

On the night of 19 July 1944, Tanz orders his driver, Kurt Hartmann, to procure a French prostitute for him. Tanz butchers her and implicates Hartmann, but offers Hartmann the chance to desert, which he accepts. When Grau, who is now a lieutenant colonel, learns of the murder, committed in the same manner as the first, he resumes his investigation and concludes that Tanz is the killer. However, his timing is unfortunate, because the next day, the Wehrmacht officers attempt to assassinate Hitler, and while Grau is accusing Tanz of murder face-to-face, word arrives that Hitler has survived, so Tanz kills Grau and labels him as one of the conspirators to cover his tracks.

In 1965, the murder of a prostitute in Hamburg draws the attention of Inspector Morand of Interpol, who worked with Grau in 1944 and owes Grau a debt of gratitude for not revealing his connection to the French Resistance during the war. Almost certain the killer of the prostitutes in Warsaw and Paris is at it again, Morand reopens the cold case. After interviewing Seidlitz-Gabler and Kahlenberge, Morand zeroes in on Tanz, who was recently released from prison after serving 20 years as a war criminal. Morand tries to find Hartmann, who is still in hiding. Seidlitz-Gabler then directs him to his daughter Ulrike, who had a relationship with Hartmann during the war, and is now estranged from her parents.

At a reunion dinner for Tanz's former Panzer division, Morand confronts Tanz. When he produces Hartmann, who had been living with Ulrike, as his witness, Tanz goes into a vacant room and kills himself.

== Cast ==
- Peter O'Toole as Lieutenant General Wilhelm Tanz
- Omar Sharif as Major (later Lt. Colonel) Grau
- Tom Courtenay as Lance Corporal Kurt Hartmann
- Donald Pleasence as Major General Klaus Kahlenberge
- Joanna Pettet as Ulrike von Seidlitz-Gabler, General Gabler's daughter
- Philippe Noiret as Inspector Morand
- Charles Gray as General Herbert von Seidlitz-Gabler
- Coral Browne as Eleonore von Seidlitz-Gabler, General Gabler's wife
- John Gregson as Colonel Sandauer, Tanz's adjutant
- Nigel Stock as Sergeant Otto Köpke, Kahlenberge's adjutant, and Hartmann's cousin
- Christopher Plummer as Field Marshal Erwin Rommel
- Juliette Gréco as Juliette, the singer in the underground Parisian restaurant
- Yves Brainville as Liesowski, a Warsaw police detective
- Sacha Pitoëff as Doctor in Warsaw
- Charles Millot as Wionczek, the witness to the murder in Warsaw
- Raymond Gérôme as the War Room Colonel, who is part of the assassination plot
- Véronique Vendell as Monique, a Parisian prostitute
- Pierre Mondy as Kopatski, one of Tanz's orderlies
- Eléonore Hirt as Melanie Neumaier, General Gabler's secretary in Warsaw
- Nicole Courcel as Raymonde, the manager of the underground Parisian restaurant
- Jenny Orléans as Mrs. Köpke, Otto's wife
- Gérard Buhr as Colonel Claus von Stauffenberg
- Michael Goodliffe as Hamburg Police Inspector Hauser
- Gordon Jackson as Captain Gottfried Engel, Grau's partner in Warsaw
- Patrick Allen as Colonel Mannheim, Grau's superior in Warsaw

Uncredited

- Harry Andrews as General Karl-Heinrich von Stülpnagel, the military governor of German-occupied France
- Howard Vernon as Willi Schussnigg, the chief suspect in the murder of the prostitute in Hamburg

== Production ==
=== Development and casting ===
Both O'Toole and Sharif were hesitant to take their roles in the film, but feeling they owed it to producer Sam Spiegel for making them international stars with Lawrence of Arabia, they did so anyway. Because they were held to the terms of an old contract agreement, O'Toole and Sharif's combined salaries reportedly were less than that paid to Donald Pleasence.

Gore Vidal, who made uncredited rewrites to the script, claimed he urged Spiegel to hire a "new, hot director", but Spiegel, instead, chose the experienced Anatole Litvak, because he already owned the rights to the novel.

=== Filming ===
Although the film was a British-French co-production, permission was granted for its first section to be shot behind the Iron Curtain on location in Warsaw, a rarity for a Western-made film at the time. The Polish People's Army provided some 200 soldiers, as well as weapons, tanks, and other vehicles, to the production. Some scenes were filmed at the Palace on the Isle, which had been used as the German occupation's headquarters during the war.

Production then moved to Paris, for interior shooting at Boulogne Studios. The museum sequence was shot at Jeu de Paume. The last scenes of the film were shot in Munich.

== Reception ==
Bosley Crowther, in an unenthusiastic review for The New York Times, described the film as "a lurid and mordant screen account of the unmasking of a general officer who likes to disembowel prostitutes." He went on to say:

It is an engrossing exhibition that mainly gives Mr. O'Toole a chance to build up the tensions and the twitches of a sex maniac, with something of the glazed-eyed characteristic of those old vampires who used to suck blood. But once this phase is completed—once we know who the killer is and have made the obvious connection of his war crimes and his private deeds—the excitement of the picture is over. At least, it was for me.

On the review aggregator website Rotten Tomatoes, 43% of 7 critics' reviews are positive.
