= My Schoolfriend =

1960 film directed by Robert Siodmak

- Directed by: Robert Siodmak
- Written by: Johannes Mario Simmel (play); Robert A. Stemmle
- Produced by: Claus Hardt; Robert Siodmak
- Starring: Heinz Rühmann; Loni von Friedl; Hertha Feiler
- Cinematography: Helmut Ashley
- Edited by: Walter Boos
- Music by: Raimund Rosenberger
- Production company: Divina-Film
- Distributed by: Gloria Film
- Release date: 22 July 1960
- Running time: 94 minutes
- Country: West Germany
- Language: German

My Schoolfriend (German: Mein Schulfreund) is a 1960 German comedy drama film directed by Robert Siodmak and starring Heinz Rühmann, Loni von Friedl, and Hertha Feiler. It is based on the eponymous play Der Schulfreund by Johannes Mario Simmel.

The film's sets were designed by the art directors Gottfried Will and Rolf Zehetbauer. It was shot at the Bavaria Studios in Munich.

== Cast ==
- Heinz Rühmann as Ludwig Fuchs
- Loni von Friedl as Rosi
- Ernst Schröder as Hauptmann Kühn
- Hertha Feiler as Frau Kühn
- Alexander Kerst as Hauptmann Sander
- Robert Graf as Dr. Lerch
- Mario Adorf as Niedermoser
- Hans Leibelt as Professor Strohbach
- Alexander Golling as Krögelmeier
- Carsta Löck as Frau Wenzel
- Werner Hessenland as Postrat
- Margaret Jahnen as Schwester Camilla
- Heinz Kargus as Wärter
- Wolfgang Reichmann as Dr. Dorn
- Hans Epskamp as Postvorstand
- Fritz Wepper as Paul
- Reinhard Glemnitz as Geldbriefträger
- Heini Göbel as Richter

== Bibliography ==
- Alpi, Deborah Lazaroff (1998). Robert Siodmak: A Biography, with Critical Analyses of His Films Noirs and a Filmography of All His Works. Jefferson, NC: McFarland. ISBN 978-0-7864-0489-6.
