= Gerda-Maria Jürgens =

German actress (1917–1998)

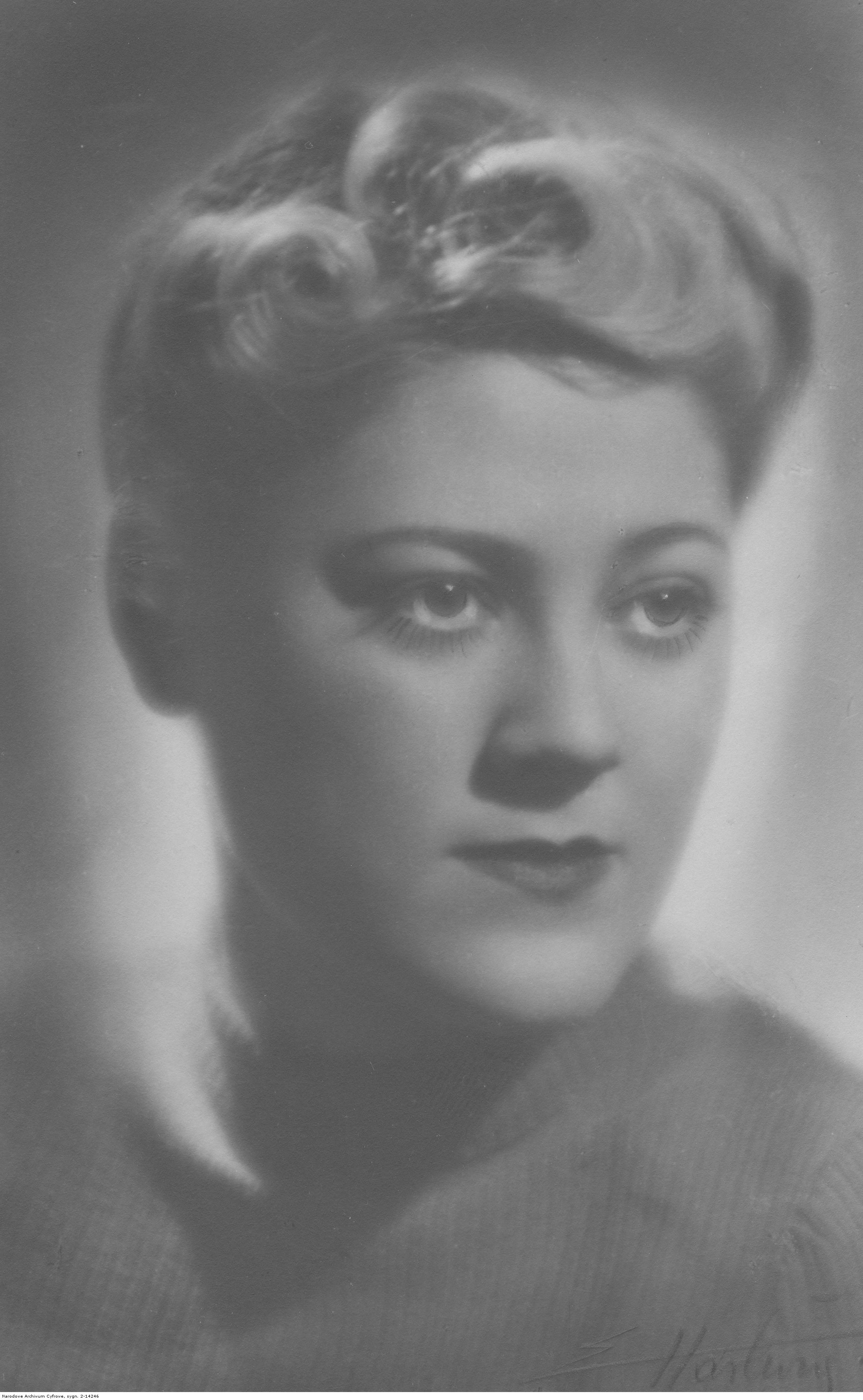
- Born: 10 May 1917; Danzig, West Prussia, Germany (now Gdańsk, Pomorskie, Poland)
- Died: 2 December 1998 (aged 81); Dachsberg, Germany
- Occupation: Actress
- Years active: 1952–1998

Gerda-Maria Jürgens (10 May 1917 – 2 December 1998) was a German actress. She appeared in more than 90 films and television shows between 1952 and 1998.

== Selected filmography ==
- The Girl with the Cat's Eyes (1958)
- The Night Before the Premiere (1959)
- Revenge of the East Frisians (1974)
