= Everyone Had Six Wings =

1954 novel by Hanoch Bartov

Everyone Had Six Wings (Hebrew: שש כנפיים לאחד) is a novel by Hanoch Bartov, published in 1954. It describes the hardships of life for those in a small neighborhood in Jerusalem after the 1948 Arab–Israeli War.

== History ==
Everyone Had Six Wings is a novel by Israeli author Hanoch Bartov, published in 1954 by Sifriat Poalim. It was the first book published to be centered around Holocaust survivors who had recently immigrated to Israel. The novel was performed on stage in 1958 at Habimah.

== Plot ==
Everyone Had Six Wings describes the life of a small neighborhood in Jerusalem, right after the 1948 Arab–Israeli War.
