= Revenge of the East Frisians =

1974 film by Walter Boos

- Directed by: Walter Boos
- Written by: August Rieger
- Cinematography: Günter Haase
- Production company: TV 13 Fernseh- und Filmgesellschaft
- Distributed by: Modern Film
- Release date: 4 October 1974
- Running time: 77 minutes
- Country: West Germany
- Language: German

Revenge of the East Frisians (German: Die Rache der Ostfriesen) is a 1974 West German sex comedy film directed by Walter Boos. It is a loose sequel to the 1973 film The East Frisian Report.

== Cast ==
- Alexandra Bogojevic as Elke Harms
- Elke Deuringer as Luise Pfannenstiel
- Florian Endlicher as Klaus Berger
- Helga Feddersen as Frau Brünitz
- Peter Hamm as Tonino
- Horst Hesslein as Herr Eppo - Wirt
- Gerda-Maria Jürgens as Frieda Harms
- Karl-Heinz Kreienbaum as Jan Harms
- Josef Moosholzer as Alfred Pfannenstiel - Direktor
- Gaby Steiner as Heike
- Jasper Vogt as Hein Harms

== Bibliography ==
- Annette Miersch. Schulmädchen-Report: der deutsche Sexfilm der 70er Jahre. Bertz, 2003.
