= Edgar Wenzel =

German actor (1919–1980)

manish thakur
- Born: 12 September 1919; Brașov, Romania
- Died: February 1980 (aged 60); Jerusalem, Israel
- Occupation: Actor
- Years active: 1958–1980 (film & TV)

Edgar Wenzel (1919–1980) was a Romanian-born German actor.

== Selected filmography ==
- The Scarlet Baroness (1959)
- Snow White and the Seven Jugglers (1962)
- The Puzzle of the Red Orchid (1962)
- The Seventh Victim (1964)
- Hugo, the Woman Chaser (1969)
- Aunt Trude from Buxtehude (1971)
- Charley's Nieces (1974)

== Bibliography ==
- Tom Johnson & Mark A. Miller. The Christopher Lee Filmography: All Theatrical Releases, 1948-2003. McFarland & Company, 2004.
