= Im Banne des Unheimlichen =

1968 film

- Directed by: Alfred Vohrer
- Screenplay by: Ladislas Fodor
- Based on: The Hand of Power by Edgar Wallace
- Produced by: Horst Wendlandt
- Starring: Joachim Fuchsberger; Siv Mattson; Wolfgang Kieling; Pinkas Braun; Monika Burg
- Cinematography: Karl Löb
- Edited by: Jutta Hering
- Music by: Peter Thomas
- Production companies: Rialto Film Preben Philipsen GmbH & Co. KG
- Release date: 17 April 1968 (West Germany)
- Running time: 89 minutes
- Country: West Germany

Im Banne des Unheimlichen (lit. Under the Spell of the Unknown); English title The Zombie Walks, a.k.a. The Hand of Power) is a 1968 West German crime film directed by Alfred Vohrer and starring Joachim Fuchsberger and Siw Mattson.

== Plot ==
Scotland Yard's Inspector Higgins (Joachim Fuchsberger) becomes involved in a case that began with the corpse of Sir Oliver supposedly laughing from inside of his own coffin during his funeral. Soon people who were close to Sir Oliver start to get killed. Sir Oliver's brother Sir Cecil swears he saw his dead brother jaunting around the countryside in a skeleton costume. Higgins teams up with reporter Peggy Brand (Siw Mattson) and his bumbling chief Sir Arthur (Hubert von Meyerinck) to unmask the villain who is killing people with a poisoned scorpion ring.

== Cast ==
- Joachim Fuchsberger as Inspektor Higgins
- Siw Mattson as Peggy Ward
- Wolfgang Kieling as Sir Cecil
- Hubert von Meyerinck as Sir Arthur
- Pinkas Braun as The Stranger
- Claude Farell as Adela
- Peter Mosbacher as Ramiro
- Siegfried Rauch as Dr. Brand
- Otto Stern as Mr. Merryl
- Renate Grosser as Mrs. Potter
- Hans Krull as Mr. Potter
- Lillemor Lindfors as Sabrina
- Ewa Strömberg as Librarian
- Ilse Pagé as Miss Finley
- Edith Schneider as Professor Bound
- Wolfgang Spier as Bannister
- Jimmy Powell as Casper

== Production ==
The screenplay for the film is based on the novel The Hand of Power by Edgar Wallace.

== Reception ==
The film premiered at the "Europa" cinema at Oberhausen in West Germany on April 17, 1968.
