= Alexandra Bogojevic =

German actress

- Born: 1951 (age 74–75); Munich, Bavaria, West Germany
- Occupation: Actress
- Years active: 1969–present (film & TV)

Alexandra "Sascha" Bogojevic (born 1951) is a German television and film actress. Bogojevic has continued her career in television films and television series since the 1980s. In 1998, she ended her actor career.

== Selected filmography ==
- The Morals of Ruth Halbfass (1972)
- The East Frisian Report (1973)
- Revenge of the East Frisians (1974)
- Salon Kitty (1976)

== Bibliography ==
- Rabkin, Leslie Y. (1998). The Celluloid Couch: An Annotated International Filmography of the Mental Health Professional in the Movies and Television, from the Beginning to 1990. Lanham, MD: Scarecrow Press. ISBN 978-0-8108-3462-0.
