= The Girl with the Cat's Eyes =

1958 film directed by Eugen York

- Directed by: Eugen York
- Written by: Werner P. Zibaso
- Produced by: Willy Zeyn
- Starring: Vera Tschechowa; Joachim Fuchsberger; Wolfgang Preiss
- Cinematography: Heinz Hölscher
- Edited by: Alexandra Anatra
- Music by: Willy Mattes
- Production company: Willy Zeyn-Film
- Distributed by: Union-Film
- Release date: 28 November 1958
- Running time: 89 minutes
- Country: West Germany
- Language: German

The Girl with the Cat's Eyes (German: Das Mädchen mit den Katzenaugen) is a 1958 West German crime thriller film directed by Eugen York and starring Vera Tschechowa, Joachim Fuchsberger and Wolfgang Preiss. It was shot at the Bendestorf Studios and on location around Hamburg. The film's sets were designed by the art director Wilhelm Vorwerg.

== Synopsis ==
Katja returns to Hamburg to live with her father has hers a job as a dancer in a nightclub on the Reeperbahn. It is in fact the front for a gang of car thieves who are using her own father's workshop through blackmail. She also encounters a police detective who is on the trail of the leader of the gang, the owner of the nightclub.

== Cast ==
- Vera Tschechowa as Katja
- Joachim Fuchsberger as Norbert Wilms
- Wolfgang Preiss as Carlo Gormann
- Mady Rahl as Juliette
- Hans Clarin as Stückchen
- Nina Hauser as Marietta
- Bum Krüger as Commissioner Krause
- Willy Krüger as Steppuhn
- Stanislav Ledinek as Papendiek
- Emmerich Schrenk as Wühles
- Peter Franck as Autoschieber Lebedans
- Gert Fröbe as Tessmann' Katja's Father
- Erwin Lehn as Self - Orchestra Conductor
- Karl-Heinz Kreienbaum as Polizist
- Gerda-Maria Jürgens as Barmaid
- Heidi Kabel as Paula

== Bibliography ==
- Bock, Hans-Michael & Bergfelder, Tim. The Concise CineGraph. Encyclopedia of German Cinema. Berghahn Books, 2009.
- Strauven, Michael. Jedermanns Lieblingsschurke: Gert Fröbe. Eine Biographie. Rotbuch Verlag, 2013.
