= The Night of the Generals (novel) =

1962 novel by Hans Hellmut Kirst

Cover of the first edition.

The Night of the Generals: A Novel (German: Die Nacht der Generale) is a thriller novel by German writer Hans Hellmut Kirst, published in 1962.

== Plot ==
In German-occupied Poland in 1940 in Warsaw, a prostitute is murdered in a bestial way. Since the Polish police discover that she is on a list of German intelligence agents, they have to summon the German military police. From the lavatory by the staircase an old man has seen the leg of the suspected killer, and states that it was most likely some kind of uniform which the killer wore that he never had seen before, adding that the trousers had a red stripe down the side.

The gathered crowd of German soldiers get angry: "He is accusing a German General!"; but their captain (Hauptmann) stops them, and asks "Why would this man lie to us?".

It has become clear for the military police captain that this very repulsive murder has been committed by a general of the Wehrmacht, and despite all the evil of the Nazi regime behind the front, a general of the German Army is nevertheless not allowed to commit sexual murders. The captain discovers that at the time of the murder only three German generals were present in Warsaw; he then decides to find out which of them is the killer.

The three generals are Tanz, Kahlenberg and Seydlitz-Gabler. The first is a sadist, who believes that a general is worth more than thousands of men. The only person he ever loved was a (male) soldier who died in his arms whispering the name of a woman that to General Tanz's mind was a whore.

In Paris, during the summer of 1944, General Seydlitz-Gabler has problems with the assassination plans against Hitler. If the assassination succeeds, he would like to be one of those who supported it, but since he cannot be sure of the outcome, he does not dare to get involved.

General Kahlenberg, is a "proper Prussian officer", but when one of his clerks gets himself into trouble by giving a public speech while drunk in which he apologises for the German presence in Paris, and soon afterwards is arrested by the Gestapo, Kahlenberg finds him a way out. He is not proud of what his clerk has done, but still does not wish him a one-way ticket to a concentration camp.

The reader understands which of the generals is guilty, and other murders follow in his tracks, but still the investigating captain is not certain and lacks proof. The war ends, and the final chapter is written in West Berlin, when the investigator, all three former generals, the Polish old man, and the chief of the new East German Volkspolizei gather.

== Adaptations ==
A film of the same title, based on the novel, was released in 1967.

== Sources ==
- Kirst, Hans Hellmut (1978). Die Nacht der Generale. Munich: Goldmann. p. 348. ISBN 3-442-03538-4.
