= Anatomy of a Genocide =

2018 book by Omer Bartov

Anatomy of a Genocide: The Life and Death of a Town called Buczacz
- Author: Omer Bartov
- Language: English
- Genre: History
- Published: 2018 (Simon & Schuster)
- Publisher: Simon & Schuster
- Publication place: United States
- ISBN: 1451684533

Anatomy of a Genocide: The Life and Death of a Town called Buczacz is a 2018 book by historian Omer Bartov exploring ethnic relations between Poles, Ukrainians, and Jews in the town of Buczacz (now Buchach, Ukraine) with a focus on the Holocaust.

== Background ==
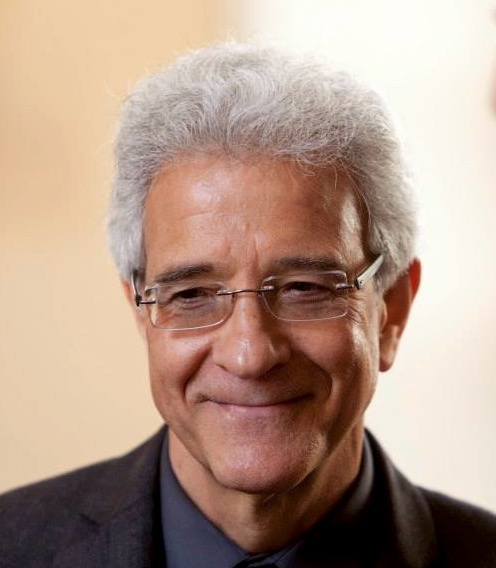
Bartov in 2014

The author, Omer Bartov, is a professor of European history at Brown University. His mother was raised in the town of Buczacz, then part of Poland, in the interwar era, and emigrated to Israel before the war; the rest of her family was murdered during the Holocaust. Bartov began work on the book in the mid-1990s after interviewing his mother and realizing that genocide "was determined not only by the encounter between external killers and local residents, but also by the existing social fabric long before the arrival of the génocidaires". While writing the book, he ended up with too much material and decided to split the project into two books, one that focused on the experiences of those who lived in Buczacz 1848–1914 and later emigrated, which he plans to publish separately.

== Publication history ==
The book was published in English by Simon & Schuster in 2018. In 2019, the book was published in Polish translation by Wydawnictwo Czarne. In 2020, the book was published in Hebrew translation by Am Oved. In 2021, the book was published by Suhrkamp Verlag in German translation.

== Reception ==
Historian Grzegorz Rossoliński-Liebe states that Bartov wrote "an important and in many ways innovative study" that elucidated the Holocaust in Galicia. "The combination of the micro-historic approach with the history of a town and the concentration on everyday life and intimate facets of the Holocaust revises our understanding of how the genocide actually took place on the local level and what it caused."

Historian Havi Dreifuss states

Anatomy of a Genocide artistically describes the way in which ethnic relations have been interwoven over the years, and it stresses the tensions that led to their tearing apart. By this, Bartov succeeds in placing Holocaust research within the scope of World War II and various genocides, without one story blurring the other. On the contrary, the joint discussion contributes both to the understanding of the fate of the Jews in Buczacz and to the construction of other groups living alongside them.

== Awards ==
The book received the National Jewish Book Award for the best 2018 book on the Holocaust.
