= Hanoch Bartov =

Israeli author and journalist

- חנוך ברטוב
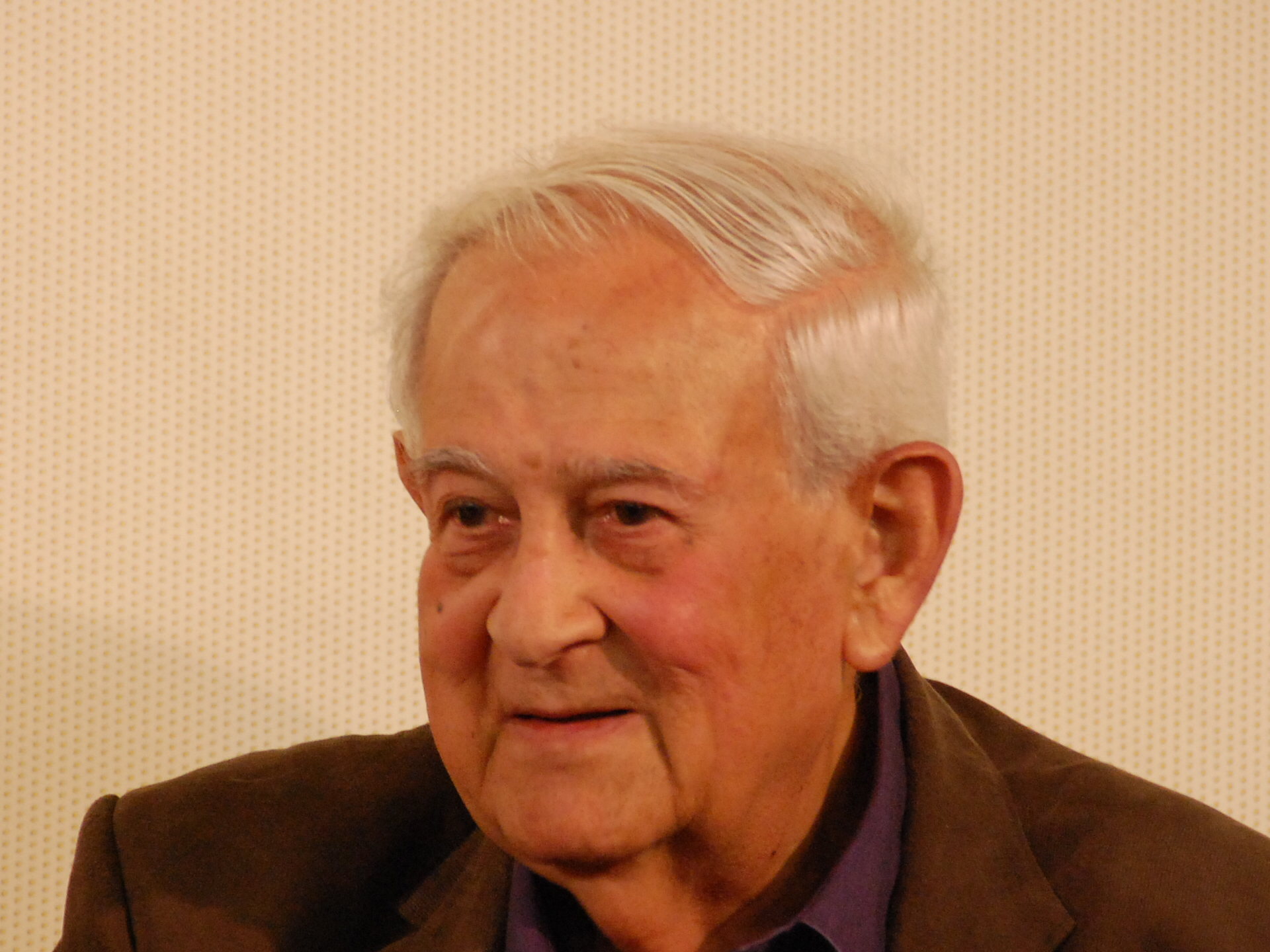
- Hanoch Bartov
- Born: Hanoch Helfgott; August 13, 1926; Petah Tikva, Mandatory Palestine
- Died: December 13, 2016 (aged 90); Tel Aviv, Israel
- Occupations: Author, journalist
- Notable work: The Brigade, Everyone Had Six Wings
- Awards: Israel Prize (2010), Bialik Prize (1985), Prime Minister's Prize for Hebrew Literary Works (1974 and 2007)

Hanoch Bartov (Hebrew: חנוך ברטוב; 13 August 1926 – 13 December 2016) was an Israeli author and journalist.

== Biography ==
Hanoch Helfgott (Bartov) was born in Petah Tikva in 1926, a year after his parents immigrated from Poland. He attended a religious school and then Ahad HaAm High School. After working in diamond polishing and welding for two years, he enlisted in the British Army in 1943 at age 17 during World War II. He spent three years in the British Army, serving in the Palestine Regiment and subsequently as a medic in the Jewish Brigade, during which he participated in the Italian campaign. He took part in combat operations before being deployed to the Netherlands and caring for Holocaust survivors in DP camps. He returned to Palestine in 1946.

Bartov published his first story in 1945, when he was a 19-year-old soldier in Europe. In his writing, as a journalist and novelist, Bartov describes his first contacts with survivors of the Holocaust. His novel The Brigade is a fictionalized account of the Jewish Brigade.

After World War II, Bartov studied Jewish and general history at the Hebrew University of Jerusalem. During the 1948 Arab-Israeli War he served in the Israel Defense Forces as a machine gun team commander in the Etzioni Brigade. He fought on the Jerusalem front and was wounded. He lived for four years on Kibbutz Ein Hahoresh, working as a farmhand and a teacher. In 1955, he moved to Tel Aviv. From 1966 to 1968, Bartov served as a cultural advisor at the Israeli embassy in London. He wrote a regular opinion column in the Maariv newspaper for 20 years.

Bartov married Yehudit Shimmer in 1946. They had two children, Omer and Gilat. Yehudit died in 1998. In 2016, three weeks before his death, he married Michal Oron, a professor of Hebrew literature and Jewish mysticism.

== Awards ==
Bartov received the following prizes for his work:

- The Ussishkin Prize in 1955.
- The Shlonsky Prize in 1965.
- The Prime Minister's Prize for Hebrew Literary Works in 1974 and again in 2007.
- The Yitzhak Sadeh Prize for Military Literature in 1978.
- The Bialik Prize for literature in 1985.
- The President's Prize for Literature in 1998.
- The Agnon Prize and Buchman Prize in 2006.
- The Yehuda Amichai-ACUM Prize for Lifetime Achievement in 2007.
- The Israel Prize for literature in 2010.

In addition, Bartov was awarded an honorary doctorate by Tel Aviv University in 2005.

== Works ==
=== Books ===
- HaHeshbon Ve-HaNefesh ("The Accounting and the Soul"), 1953.
- Shesh Kenafaim Le-Echad ("Six Wings for One"), 1954. English translation: Everyone Had Six Wings, 1974.
- HaShuk HaKatan ("The Little Market"), 1957.
- Arba Yisraelim Ve-Kol America ("Four Israelis and all America"), 1961.
- Lev HaHamim ("Heart of Sages"), 1962.
- Pitzei Bagrut ("Wounds of Maturity"), 1965. English translation: The Brigade, 1967.
- Yisraelim Be-Hatzer Saint James ("Israelis in the Court of St. James"), 1969. English translation: An Israeli at the Court of St. James, 1971.
- Shel Mi Ata Yeled ("Whose Boy Are You?"), 1970. English translation: Whose Little Boy Are You?, 1978.
- Ahot Rahoka ("Distant Sister"), 1973.
- HaBedu'ai ("The Bedouin"), 1975.
- Dado, 48 Shanim Ve-Od 20 Yom ("Dado, 48 Years and another 20 Days"), 1978. English translation: Dado, 48 years 20 days (1981). An updated edition of this book was published in Hebrew in 2002 but it has not been translated to English.
- Yehudi Katan ("A Little Jew"), 1981.
- Be-Emtza Haroman ("In the Middle of it All"), 1984.
- Mazal Ayala ("Ayala's Star"), 1988.
- Yerid Be-Moskva ("A Fair in Moscow"), 1988.
- Ze Ishel Medaber ("This is Ishel Speaking"), 1990.
- Mavet Be-Purim ("Death on Purim"), 1992.
- Regel Echad Bahutz ("One Foot Outside"), 1994.
- Ani Lo Hatzabar Hamitologi ("I'm not the Mythological Sabra"), 1995.
- Lev Shafuch ("A Heart Poured Out"), 2001.
- Mitom Ad Tom ("End to End"), 2001.
- Michutz Le'Ofek, Me'ever Le'Rehov ("Beyond the Horizon, Across the Street"), 2006.
- Lichiyot Ve-Ligdol Be-Eretz Yisrael ("To live and to grow up in the Land of Israel"), 2008.
- Kriya Iveret ("Blind Reading"), 2013.

=== Plays ===
- Shesh Kenafaim Le-Echad ("Six Wings for One"), 1958.
- Sa-Habayta Yonatan ("Go Home Yonatan"), 1963.

== See also ==
- List of Israel Prize recipients
