= Josef Moosholzer =

German actor

- Born: 20 November 1932
- Died: 18 February 2004 (aged 71); Munich, Bavaria, Germany
- Occupation: Actor
- Years active: 1950–2000

Josef Moosholzer (1932–2004) was a German film and television actor. He starred in several sex comedies during the 1970s.

== Filmography ==
Year	Title	Role	Notes
1950	Die Sterne lügen nicht	Hotelboy	
1968	Take Off Your Clothes, Doll	Nachtklubbesucher	Uncredited
1969	Pepe, der Paukerschreck	Lehrer	Uncredited
1969	Hurra, die Schule brennt!	Zuschauer im Theater	Uncredited
1969	Student of the Bedroom	Polizist	Uncredited
1970	Jill in the Box	Mann mit Spazierstock	
1970	We'll Take Care of the Teachers	Lagerverwalter	Uncredited
1970	Graf Porno bläst zum Zapfenstreich	Gastwirt	
1970	The Age of the Fish		
1970	3 Variationen über die Freiheit		
1971	Beichte einer Liebestollen	Holzer	
1971	Office Girls	Mitarbeiter bei Fa. Wieland	
1971	Gestatten... Vögelein im Dienst	Nervenarzt	
1971	Morgen fällt die Schule aus	Lehrer	Uncredited
1971	Hausfrauen-Report	Paul Eichinger	
1971	Ehemänner-Report	Hirnbeiss	
1971	Der Neue Schulmädchen	Herr Müller	Uncredited
1971	Paragraph 218 – Wir haben abgetrieben, Herr Staatsanwalt		
1971	Obszönitäten		
1971	Pornografie illegal?		
1971	Holiday Report	Wirt des Gasthofs, wo Ina mit Jürgen übernachtet	
1971	Hausfrauen-Report 2	Opitz	
1971	Schüler-Report	Alfred	
1971	Das bumsfidele Häuschen		
1972	Gefährlicher Sex frühreifer Mädchen	Mann im Zug und Vergewaltiger	
1972	Die Klosterschülerinnen	Pedell Mooshammer	
1972	Schulmädchen-Report 3. Teil	Herr Maier	Uncredited
1972	Die jungen Ausreißerinnen - Sex-Abenteuer deutscher Mädchen in aller Welt	Tonio	
1972	Liebesspiele junger Mädchen	Freier im Massagesalon Gisela	
1972	The Sensuous Housewife	Albert Beck - BeckFriseurmeister	
1972	The Disciplined Woman	Pauls Freund Otto	
1972	Lehrmädchen-Report	Meister Kruttke	
1972	Betragen ungenügend!	Lehrer	Uncredited
1972	Hochzeitsnacht-Report	Sepp	
1972	Mädchen, die nach München kommen	Otto Baldhammer	
1972	Massagesalon der jungen Mädchen	Steuerfahnder	
1972	Blutjunge Masseusen	Kunde von Alma	
1972	Schulmädchen-Report 4. Teil	Förster	Uncredited
1972	Die Mädchenhändler	Bordellkunde	
1972	Die liebestollen Apothekerstöchter	Giselher	
1972	Lilli - die Braut der Kompanie	Feldwebel Murr	
1972	Gefährlicher Sex frühreifer Mädchen 2	Herr Meierhofer	
1973	Housewives on the Job	Xaver Kirchhofer	
1973	Mädchen auf Stellungssuche - Der Hostessen-Sex-Report		
1973	Liebesschule blutjunger Mädchen	Konditor	
1973	Geilermanns Töchter - Wenn Mädchen mündig werden	Josef	
1973	Sex-Träume-Report	Willi Wasmuth	
1973	Schlüsselloch-Report	Moser, Campingplatzverwalter	
1973	Hausfrauen-Report 4	Prof. Dr. Fridebert Walzl	
1973	Liebesmarkt	Schornsteinfeger	
1973	Liebesjagd durch 7 Betten	Bauarbeiter	
1973	Schulmädchen-Report 6. Teil	Arbeiter mit Bierflasche	
1973	The East Frisian Report	Alois	
1973	Unterm Dirndl wird gejodelt	Josef	
1973	Urlaubsgrüße aus dem Unterhöschen	Walter Kesselbach	
1973	Muschimaus mag's grad heraus	Bürgermeister Habicht	
1973	Das darf doch nicht wahr sein!		
1974	Around the World with Fanny Hill	Judge	
1974	Wenn die prallen Möpse hüpfen	Dr. V. Stoss	
1974	Autostop-Lustreport	Gangster	
1974	Vild på sex	Kant, the voyeur	
1974	Charley's Nieces	Max	
1974	Oktoberfest! Da kann man fest...	Franz Holzinger	
1974	Beim Jodeln juckt die Lederhose	Direktor Müller	
1974	Jodeln is ka Sünd	Beppo Obermoser	
1974	Wo der Wildbach durch das Höschen rauscht - Witwen-Report	Alois Lechner	
1974	Revenge of the East Frisians	Alfred Pfannenstiel - Direktor	
1974	Auf ins blaukarierte Himmelbett	Manderl	
1974	Der gestohlene Himmel		Uncredited
1975	Jagdrevier der scharfen Gemsen	Schmidinger	
1975	Mein Onkel Theodor oder Wie man viel Geld im Schlaf verdient	Kurdirektor Pichmann	
1978	Hurra - Die Schwedinnen sind da	Sepp Huber, Bürgermeister	
1979	Disco Fieber		
1979	Zum Gasthof der spritzigen Mädchen	Pfarrer Eiweiss	
1980	Vergiss beim Sex die Liebe nicht	Egon	
1980	Der Kurpfuscher und seine fixen Töchter	Bürgermeister	
1981	Ach du lieber Harry	Schaffner	Uncredited

== Bibliography ==
- Annette Miersch. Schulmädchen-Report: der deutsche Sexfilm der 70er Jahre. Bertz, 2003.
