= Konstantin Wecker =

German musician (born 1947)

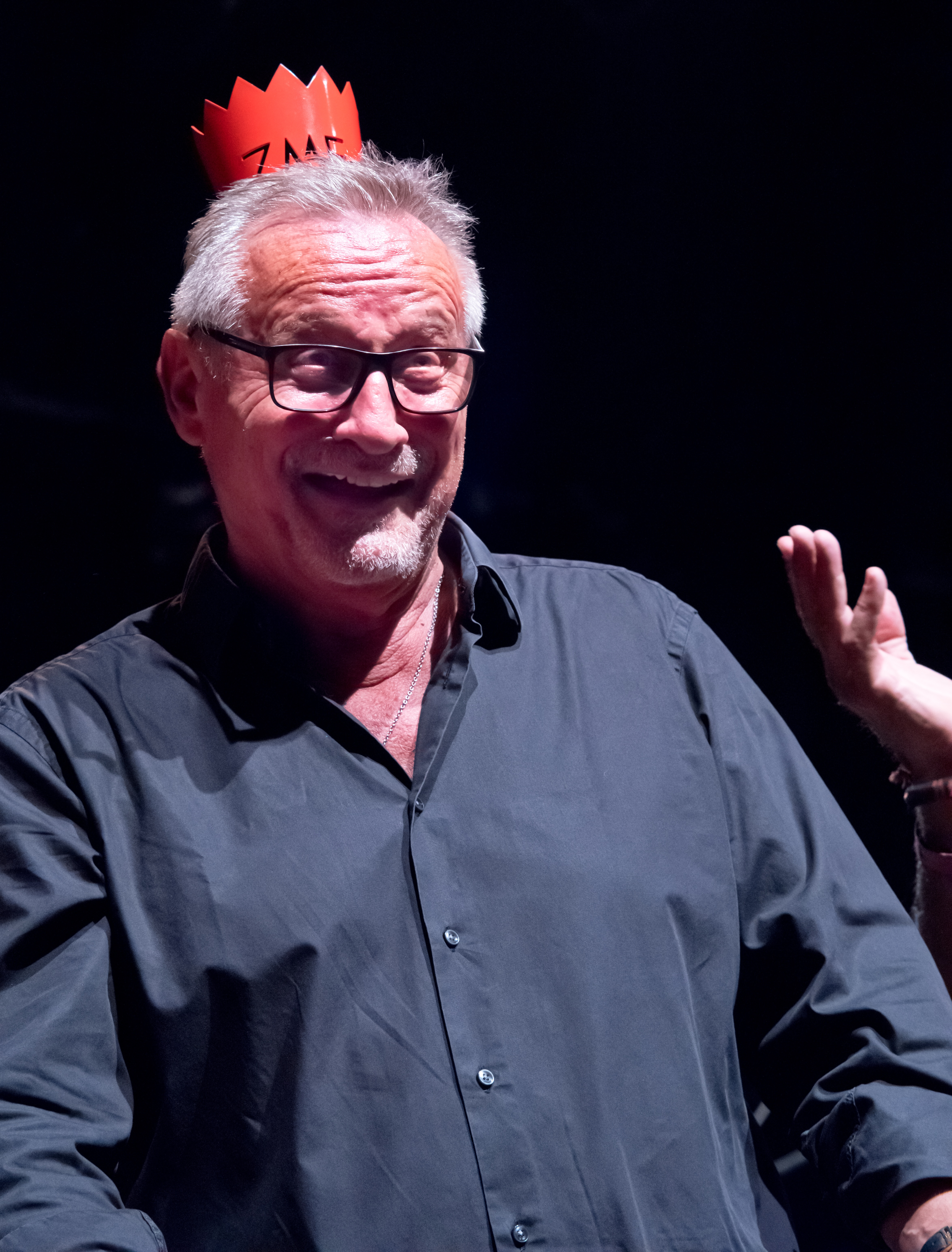
Wecker as honorary award winner at the Zelt-Musik-Festival 2018 in Freiburg, Germany

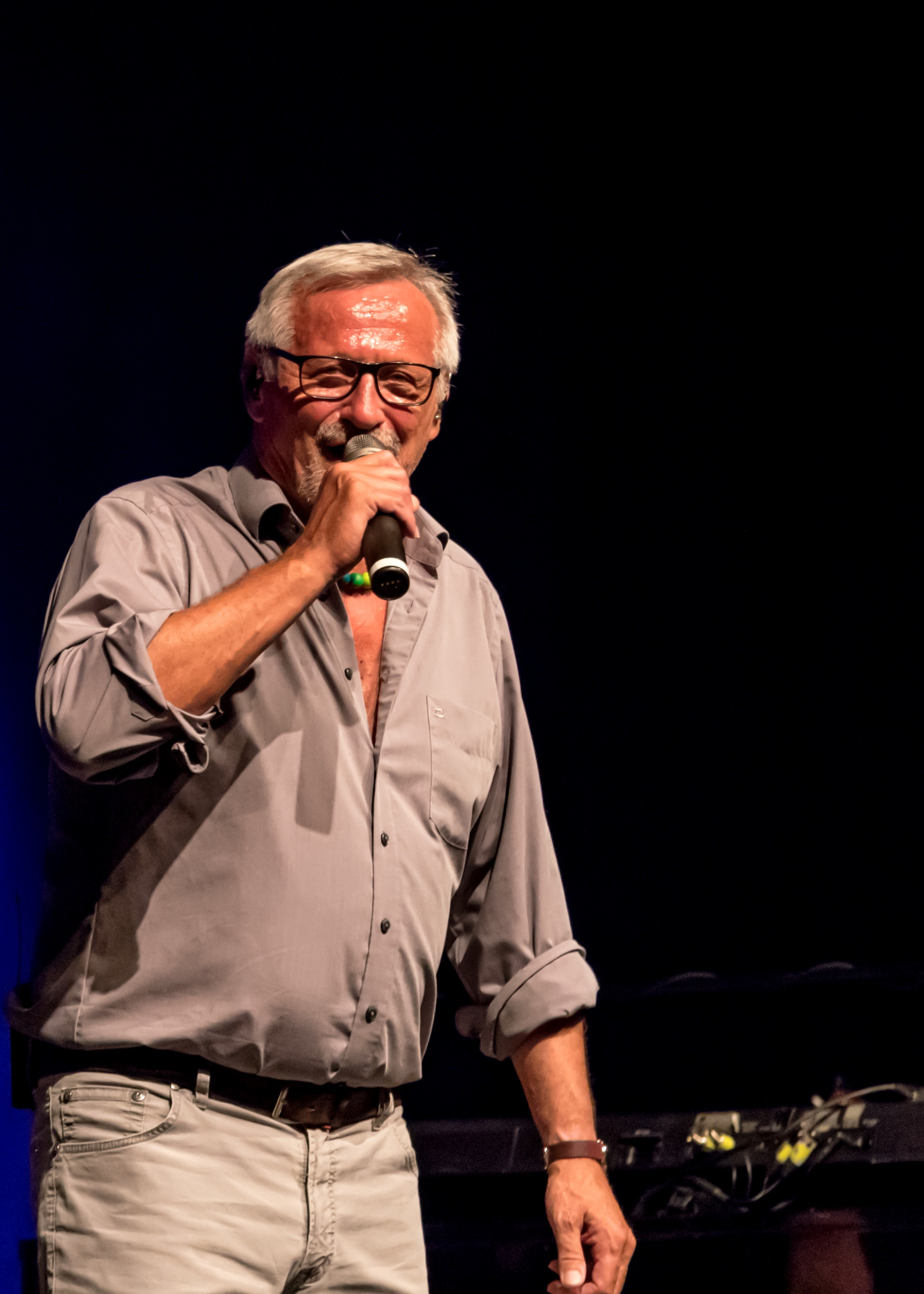
Konstantin Wecker Zelt-Musik-Festival 2017 in Freiburg, Germany

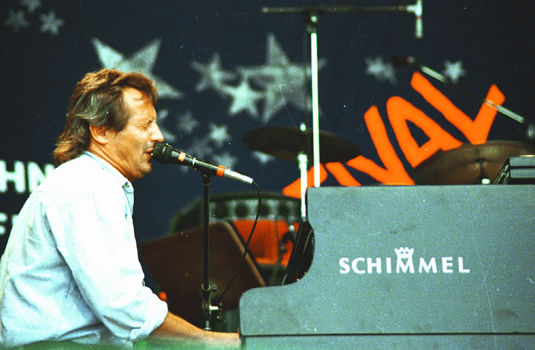
Wecker in concert, 1986

Konstantin Alexander Wecker (born 1 June 1947) is a German Liedermacher (singer-songwriter) who also works as a composer, author and actor.

== Life and work ==
Wecker was born in Munich. Classically educated at the Wilhelmsgymnasium, Wecker got one of his first jobs as a songwriter at Munich's cabaret "Münchner Lach- und Schießgesellschaft" in 1973. His breakthrough as a singer came in 1977 with the record Genug ist nicht genug ("Enough Is Not Enough"), which includes the popular talking blues "Willy," about a presumably close friend of Wecker's who was slain by drunken Nazis.

Wecker has released more than forty albums, and has also composed music for film, theater, and children's musicals.

In 2003, Wecker became a public opponent of the Iraq War, joining his leftist Liedermacher colleagues Hannes Wader and Reinhard Mey.

In March 2006, Wecker was forced to cancel a scheduled performance in the small town of Halberstadt, Saxony-Anhalt. This came after the far-right National Democratic Party (NPD) pressured local authorities and threatened to forcibly disrupt the concert. Wecker pledged to return to Halberstadt in the summer of 2006 and eventually performed in Halberstadt on 17 June 2006, accompanied by fellow singer-songwriter Hannes Wader and Afghan percussionist Hakim Ludin.

== 2025 accusations ==
In November 2025, Wecker was accused of having had an abusive relationship with a 15-year-old pupil in 2011 and 2012, according to research done by the Süddeutsche Zeitung. The accuser states that Wecker did not engage in sexual intercourse with her until she turned 16, which is the age of consent in Germany for most purposes. Wecker's actions and communications with the accuser have been described as manipulative, jealous and malicious. Wecker has apologized for the relationship, but did not admit all accusations - he said that his alcoholism means that he barely remembers the period in question. The victim's lawyer advised her that Wecker's actions were a legal grey area. The accuser ultimately did not seek criminal charges, although she remains impacted by the relationship and has spent time in a psychiatric hospital.

== Selected works ==
=== Albums ===
- 1972: Die sadopoetischen Gesänge des Konstantin Amadeus Wecker (later renamed as: Konstantin's Erste)
- 1974: Ich lebe immer am Strand
- 1977: Genug ist nicht genug
- 1978: Eine ganze Menge Leben
- 1979: Live
- 1980: Liederbuch
- 1981: Live in München
- 1982: Das macht mir Mut
- 1984: Inwendig warm
- 1987: Wieder dahoam – Live in Austria
- 1989: Stilles Glück, trautes Heim
- 1993: Uferlos
- 1996: Gamsig
- 1998: Brecht
- 2001: Vaterland
- 2005: Am Flußufer
- 2006: Politische Lieder
- 2007: Alles das und mehr (DVD music video)
- 2011: Wut und Zärtlichkeit
- 2012: Wut und Zärtlichkeit (live)
- 2015: Ohne Warum
- 2017: Poesie und Widerstand
- 2018: Sage Nein! Antifaschistische Lieder 1978 bis heute

=== Collaborations ===
- 1988: Joan Baez / Konstantin Wecker / Mercedes Sosa: Three worlds, three voices, one vision
- 1999: Jutta Richter / Konstantin Wecker: Es lebte ein Kind auf den Bäumen // book and CD
- 2001: Konstantin Wecker / Hannes Wader: Was für eine Nacht
- 2003: Reinhard Mey / Hannes Wader / Konstantin Wecker: Das Konzert
- 2010: Konstantin Wecker / Hannes Wader: Kein Ende in Sicht

=== Filmography ===
- Mein ganzes Herz ist voll Musik, West Germany 1959, Musikfilm (Mitwirkung und Soloauftritt im Rudolf Lamy Kinderchor)
- Die Autozentauren, West Germany 1972, TV film (Darsteller)
- Love in 3-D, West Germany 1973, 93 min., Sexfilm, (as Rudi)
- The East Frisian Report, Der Ostfriesen-Report: O mei, haben die Ostfriesen Riesen, West Germany, 1973, 80 min., Komödie / Sexfilm (as Hinnerk)
- Unterm Dirndl wird gejodelt, West Germany 1973, Sexfilm (as Florian)
- Geilermanns Töchter – Wenn Mädchen mündig werden, West Germany 1973, Sexfilm (as Stefan)
- Liebesmarkt – Matratzen-Horchdienst, West Germany 1973, Sexfilm (as Tom)
- Beim Jodeln juckt die Lederhose, West Germany 1974, Sexfilm (as Sepp)
- Sisters, or the Balance of Happiness, West Germany 1979, 95 min., Frauenfilm / Drama (as Robert Edelschneider)
- Die Weiße Rose, West Germany, 1982, 123 min., Politthriller / Biografie
- Peppermint Peace, West Germany 1983, 110 min., Drama / Jugendfilm (as Schreiner Lustig)
- Sag nein, West Germany 1983, 98 min., documentary (Konzertausschnitt)
- Ende der Freiheit, West Germany 1983, 85 min., documentary (Konzertausschnitt)
- What's Up, Chancellor?, West Germany 1984, 92 min., Komödie (as Straßenmusikant)
- Atemnot, Austria 1983 / 84, 95 min., Drama (Konzertauftritt mit Sigi Maron und Konstantin)
- Martha Dubronski, Switzerland 1984, 96 min., Literaturverfilmung / Drama (as Fleischhauer)
- Stinkwut, West Germany 1986, TV film (Sänger Titellied mit Zither)
- Kir Royal, West Germany 1986, TV series (as Studiomusiker, 6. episode)
- Spaltprozesse, West Germany 1987, documentary (Konzertausschnitt mit Konstantin Wecker)
- Dreifacher Rittberger, West Germany 1987, TV series (as Klavierträger, 4. episode)
- Der Geisterwald – Blutbuche und Rabenrache, West Germany 1988, TV series (as Rabe)
- Deutsche Redensarten und ihr Ursprung – Jemandem einen Korb geben, Germany 1989, TV short (as Spielmann)
- Die Republikaner, Germany 1990, documentary (Konzertausschnitt)
- Tatort – Blue Lady, Germany 1990 (as Rainer Seifert)
- Go Trabi Go, Deutschland, 1991, Filmkomödie (as Playboy)
- Pauline In Between, Germany 1992, 92 min., Komödie (as Barpianist)
- Lilien in der Bank, Germany 1992, 104 min. (as Turnlehrer)
- Das Babylon Komplott, Austria 1993, TV film (as Thomas)
- 1945, Austria 1994, TV film (as Bauer Mühlberger)
- Ärzte: Dr. Schwarz und Dr. Martin, Germany 1994 / 1996, TV series in 8 episodes (as Franzl Unterrainer)
- Für mich soll's rote Rosen regnen, Germany 1995, documentary about Hildegard Knef (Gesprächsausschnitt mit K. Wecker)
- Kriminaltango, Germany 1995, TV series (as Mischa König, episode 6 „Münchner Freiheit")
- SOKO 5113: Tommy, Germany 1999, episode of the TV series (as Manfred Brunnhorst)
- At Fifty Men Kiss Differently, Germany 1999, TV film (as Bildhauer Gerd)
- Days of Darkness, Germany 1999, TV film (as Herr Rinser)
- Ein lasterhaftes Pärchen, Germany 2000, TV film (as Frank)
- Alles mit Besteck, Germany 2001, short (as Pianist)
- Edelweiß, Austria 2000 (as Paul Richter)
- In der Mitte eines Lebens, Germany 2003, TV miniseries (as Tom Hochreiter)
- Apollonia, Germany 2005, TV film (as Müller Vinz)
- Grave Decisions, Germany 2006
- The Room in the Mirror, Germany 2009
- Wunderkinder, Germany 2011
