= Ursula Reit =

German actress (1914–1998)

- Ursula Reit in Willy Wonka and the Chocolate Factory as Mrs. Gloop
- Born: Ursula Schedereit; 5 March 1914; Wuppertal, Germany
- Died: 9 November 1998 (aged 84); Germany
- Occupation: Actress
- Years active: 1962–1995
- Family: Karl Schedereit (brother)

Ursula Reit (née Schedereit; 5 March 1914 – 9 November 1998), also known as Ursula Reith, was a German television and movie character actress, (both feature's and telefilms) and the sister of actor Karl Schedereit.

She was best known for her role in the film Willy Wonka and the Chocolate Factory in 1971 as Mrs. Gloop, the mother of gluttonous Golden Ticket winner Augustus Gloop

Reit's roles were primarily on German television between 1962 and 1995, though she also worked in theatre. After retiring, Reit remained out of the public eye. She reportedly died in 1998 from natural causes, although details about her death and personal life are unknown.

== Selected filmography ==
- Pudelnackt in Oberbayern (1969) - Frau Glasedonner
- Graf Porno und die liebesdurstigen Töchter (1969) - Esmeralda (uncredited)
- Who Laughs Last, Laughs Best (1971) - Margot Krüglein
- Willy Wonka & the Chocolate Factory (1971) - Mrs Gloop
- Hilfe, die Verwandten kommen (1971)
- Paragraph 218 – Wir haben abgetrieben, Herr Staatsanwalt (1971)
- Das bumsfidele Häuschen (1971)
- Hauptsache Ferien (1971) - Frau Haftlingrt
- Die liebestollen Apothekerstöchter (1972) - Cook at the clinic (uncredited)
- Eine Armee Gretchen (1973) - Nun Anna (uncredited)
- Mit der Liebe spielt man nicht (1973)
- Three Men in the Snow (1974) - Wondraschek, Telefonistin
- Charley's Nieces (1974) - Krankenschwester (uncredited)
- Oktoberfest! Da kann man fest... (1974) - Frau Kunkera (uncredited)
- Magdalena – vom Teufel besessen (1974) - Accident Witness
- Schulmädchen-Report 9 (1975) - Lilos Mutter (uncredited)
- Schulmädchen-Report 10. Teil (1976) - Seffis Tante (uncredited)
- Rosemary's Daughter (1976) - Internatsleiterin
- Raindrops (1981)
- Pappa Ante Portas (1991) - Bekannte der Familie: Frau Klapproth
