= Office Girls (film) =

1971 film

- Directed by: Ernst Hofbauer
- Written by: Günther Heller
- Produced by: Wolf C. Hartwig
- Starring: Reinhard Glemnitz; Emily Reuer; Karin Field
- Cinematography: Klaus Werner
- Music by: Peter Thomas
- Production company: Rapid Film
- Distributed by: Constantin Film
- Release date: 26 March 1971
- Running time: 86 minutes
- Country: West Germany
- Language: German

Office Girls (German: Erotik im Beruf) is a 1971 West German sex comedy film directed by Ernst Hofbauer and starring Reinhard Glemnitz, Emily Reuer and Karin Field. It was produced by Rapid Film which specialised in lower-budget sex comedies during the period.

== Synopsis ==
An office manager is caught having sex with one of his co-workers. Two reporters decide to investigate the subject and uncover exactly what is going on during the working day.

== Cast ==
- Reinhard Glemnitz as Rechtsanwalt
- Emily Reuer as Frau Schneider
- Karin Field as Irina Wördemann
- Günther Ungeheuer as Staatsanwalt
- Christian Engelmann as Reporter
- Peter Raschner as Reporter
- Barbara Stanek as Biggi
- Heidi Hansen as Karla
- Renate Kasché as Jutta Bornstedt
- Tonio von der Meden as Georg Bornstedt
- Karin Götz as Doris
- Leopold Gmeinwieser as Herbert
- Wolf Petersen as Hans Schneider
- Eva Berthold as Dr. Hella Wiesbrunner
- Astrid Boner as Sadistische Ehefrau
- Josef Fröhlich as Sadistischer Ehemann
- Helmut Brasch as Direktor Wieland
- Ursula Bode as Fräulein Spannholz
- Margot Mahler as Fräulein Grundmann
- Walter Feuchtenberg as Herr Lüdemann
- Günter Geiermann as Herr Dietz
- Claudia Butenuth as Frau Dietz
- Helmut Früchtenicht as Richter
- Harald Baerow as Herr Baumann
- Michael Conti as Dieter Stein
- Werner Abrolat as Photograph
- Josef Moosholzer as Mitarbeiter der Firma Wieland

== Bibliography ==
- Bergfelder, Tim. International Adventures: German Popular Cinema and European Co-Productions in the 1960s. Berghahn Books, 2005.
- Miersch, Annette. Schulmädchen-Report: der deutsche Sexfilm der 70er Jahre. Bertz, 2003.
