= The East Frisian Report =

1973 film by Walter Boos

- Josef Moosholzer and Alexandra Bogojevic
- German: Der Ostfriesen-Report: O mei, haben die Ostfriesen Riesen
- Directed by: Walter Boos
- Written by: Fred Denger
- Produced by: Cinema 77
- Starring: Josef Moosholzer; Margot Mahler
- Cinematography: Ernst W. Kalinke
- Music by: Max Hieber; Konstantin Wecker
- Production company: Cinema 77
- Distributed by: Constantin Film
- Release date: 12 October 1973
- Running time: 80 minutes
- Country: West Germany
- Language: German

The East Frisian Report (German: Der Ostfriesen-Report: O mei, haben die Ostfriesen Riesen) is a 1973 West German sex comedy and road film directed by Walter Boos.

== Theme ==
Despite its title, Der Ostfriesen-Report is not a sex report film but a Bavarian sex comedy film bringing in elements from East Frisian jokes. Shot mainly in and around Neßmersiel, the film brings two popular German regional stereotypes (Bavarians vs. East Frisians) together. The film was sometimes known as Swedish Playgirls, despite the fact it is set in Germany rather than Sweden. It was followed by a loose sequel Revenge of the East Frisians in 1974.

== Plot ==
A Munich night club owned by East Frisian Ossi Jansen is in decline. He commissions two hardheaded Bavarians, night club director Alois Mooser and his raunchy girlfriend Lisa, to travel to East Frisia and recruit fresh girls.

== Cast ==
- Gerd Arnau as wedding guest
- Bert Block
- Alexandra Bogojevic as Wibke
- Elke Boltenhagen as girl in a sauna
- Isa Brandt as stripper
- Elke Deuringer as wedding guest
- Antonio di Tullio as Rasputin
- Walter Feuchtenberg as East Frisian
- Claudia Fielers as wedding guest
- Leopold Gmeinwieser as Lars
- Hans Georg Goebel
- Joachim Hackethal as Ossi Jansen
- Günther Heinlein as Mercedes passenger
- Karin Hofmann as Gigi
- Heinz Kopitz as Mercedes-driver
- Klaus Kühn as Alwin
- Eleonore Leipert as wedding guest
- Tina Lercher
- Marie Luise Lusewitz as Gunda
- Margot Mahler as Lisa
- Monika Micklich as Helma
- Josef Moosholzer as Alois
- Marc Nissimoff as Harms
- Frank Nossack as Theo
- Alena Penz as Nelly
- Manfred Raab
- Evelyn Raess as Daggi
- Juliane Rom-Sock as Britt
- Wolfgang Scherer as Wirt
- Rosi Schubert as stripper
- Gisela Schwartz as Antje
- Paul Spät
- Uschi Stiegelmaier as milkmaid
- Melitta Tegeler as Gina
- Gudrun Thiel as stripper
- Marita Vogelsang as wedding guest
- Konstantin Wecker as Hinnerk
