= Joachim Fuchsberger =

German actor and TV host

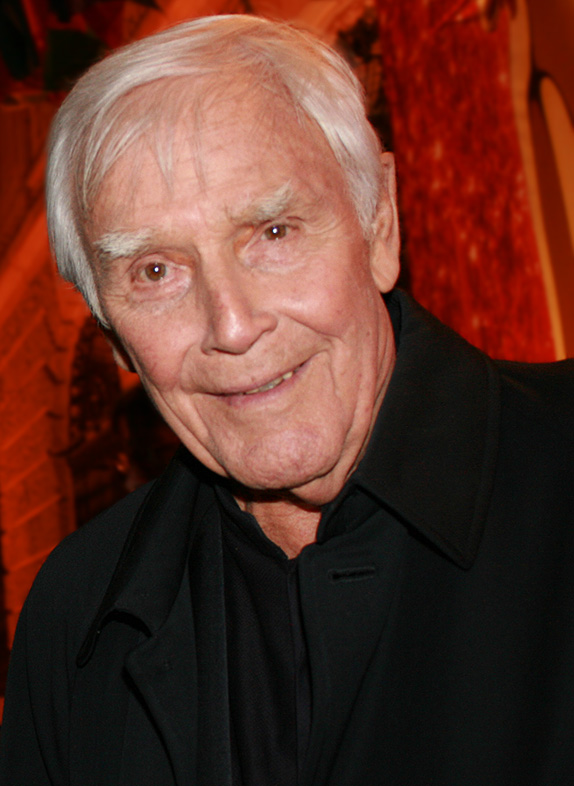
- Fuchsberger in 2008
- Born: 11 March 1927; Zuffenhausen, Württemberg, Weimar Germany
- Died: 11 September 2014 (aged 87); Grünwald, Bavaria, Germany
- Other name: "Blacky" Fuchsberger
- Occupations: Actor, television host
- Years active: 1953–2013
- Spouse(s): Gitta Lind (1951–1953) (divorced); Gundula Korte (1954–his death) (1 son)

Joachim "Blacky" Fuchsberger (pronounced [ˈjoːaxɪm ˈfʊksbɛʁɡɐ]; 11 March 1927 – 11 September 2014) was a German actor and television host, best known to a wide German-speaking audience as one of the recurring actors in various Edgar Wallace movies (often a Detective Inspector with Scotland Yard). In the English-speaking world, he was sometimes credited as Akim Berg or Berger.

== Life and career ==
Fuchsberger was born in Zuffenhausen, today a district of Stuttgart, and was a member of the obligatory Hitler Youth. During World War II, at the age of 16, he was trained as a Fallschirmjäger, combat instructor and sent to the Eastern Front where he was wounded. He was captured in a hospital in Stralsund by the Red Army and came into Soviet captivity and later in American and British captivity. Because of this turbulent time of his youth in Second World War, he never obtained a school diploma. In 1946, he worked as a coal miner for the British in Recklinghausen. His nickname Blacky hails from that time.

After his release, he worked as an engineer for typesetting and printing machines in the family business and later in a publishing house in Düsseldorf. In 1949, he was advertising manager of the German Building Exhibition in Nuremberg. From 1950 to 1952, he was spokesman at the radio station in Munich and newsreel spokesman. In 1951, he married the pop singer Gitta Lind, from whom he divorced after two years. In 1954 he married the radio technician and actress Gundula Korte (born 24 March 1930), with whom he has a son. In the same year he had his breakthrough playing "Gunner Asch" in the three-part war film 08/15 film series, based on the novel by Hans Hellmut Kirst.

After several war films, he starred in the 1959 film Der Frosch mit der Maske (The Frog with the Mask) playing amateur detective Richard Gordon. More than 3.2 million visitors saw the movie in the cinema. The surprising success laid the foundation for many other film adaptations of novels by Edgar Wallace.

After this success, he played the detective in another 12 Edgar Wallace films: 1960 – Chief Inspector Long in The Terrible People; 1961 – Inspector Larry Holt in The Dead Eyes of London; 1961 – Insurance Agent Jack Tarling in The Devil's Daffodil; 1961 – Inspector Mike Dorn in The Strange Countess; 1962 – Inspector Wade in The Inn on the River; 1963 – Clifford Lynne in Der Fluch der gelben Schlange (The Curse of the Yellow Snake); 1963 – Estate manager Dick Alford in The Black Abbot; 1964 – Investigator Johnny Gray in Room 13; 1964 – Inspector Higgins in Der Hexer (The Warlock); 1967 – Inspector Higgins in The College Girl Murders; 1968 – Inspector Higgins in Im Banne des Unheimlichen (Under the Spell of the Sinister); 1972 – Inspector Barth in What Have You Done to Solange?.

Fuchsberger was the stadium announcer for the opening and closing ceremonies of the 1972 Summer Olympics in Munich. During the closing ceremony, it was suspected that a hijacked passenger aircraft was on its way to the stadium. Fuchsberger, fearing a panic, decided against evacuation. This decision was vindicated when the original suspicion turned out to have been false.

In the late 1960s, Fuchsberger co-founded a real estate company that went bankrupt in a short time. At 42, he had lost his entire fortune, had to sell his villa and sat on a mountain of debt. With the help of his wife, Gundula, good friends and tireless work, he managed to discharge the debt and to start a new existence.

In 1978, he was bitten by a chimpanzee during a TV show and fell seriously ill with hepatitis B. He spent 4 months at the quarantine station and suffered through a depression but recovered. He withdrew from film and television work in the late 1970s and concentrated on his stage career. In the late 1990s he started reappearing in some television movies, which after a break he continued from the late 2000s until his death.

In 1984, he was the first German ambassador for UNICEF. On 13 November 2006, he was awarded the Bavarian State Medal for Social Services for those activities. Since 2009, Fuchsberger is member of the Board of Trustees of the 2011 FIFA Women's World Cup and co-patron of the volunteer program for the FIFA Women's World Cup 2011.

His son, Thomas (1957–2010), was a composer and drowned in Kulmbach on 14 October 2010. Late in life, Fuchsberger lived in Grünwald near Munich and in Sandy Bay, Hobart, Tasmania. He held Australian citizenship together with his original German one. He died of organ failure at his German home in Grünwald on 11 September 2014. He is survived by his wife Gundula and two grandchildren.

== Awards ==
- 1942 – War Merit Cross 2nd Class with Swords
- 1961 – Bravo Otto
- 1961 – Goldener Bildschirm
- 1969 – Bambi Award
- 1970 – International Film Ribbon (Italy)
- 1970 – Bravo Otto
- 1971 – Bravo Otto
- 1972 – Bravo Otto
- 1979 – Bavarian Order of Merit
- 1982 – Goldene Kamera
- 1982 – Bambi Award
- 1983 – Federal Cross of Merit
- 1985 – Der liebe Augustin (Austria)
- 1986 – Goldene Europa
- 1983 – Pipe smoker of the year (Germany)
- 1994 – Grand Federal Cross of Merit
- 1999 – Honorary Ambassador of Tourism (Tasmania)
- 2005 – Bavarian TV Awards
- 2006 – Bavarian State Medal for social services
- 2007 – Brisant Brillant
- 2007 – DVD Champion in the category Lifetime Achievement Award
- 2008 – Platin Kurier Romy
- 2009 – Sächsischer Dankesorden
- 2010 – Goldene Kamera for Lifetime Achievement
- 2011 – Deutscher Fernsehpreis for Lifetime Achievement
- 2011 – German Sustainability Award
- 2012 – Bambi Award for his life's work

== Selected filmography ==
- 1953: Open Your Window (Director: Anton Kutter)
- 1954: Wenn ich einmal der Herrgott wär (Director: Anton Kutter) .... Fred
- 1954: 08/15 (Director: Paul May) .... Gefreiter Asch
- 1955: The Song of Kaprun (Director: Anton Kutter) .... Der 'schöne Eugen'
- 1955: 08/15 – Part 2 (Director: Paul May) .... Wachtmeister Asch
- 1955: The Last Man (Director: Harald Braun) .... Alwin Radspieler
- 1955: 08/15 at Home (Director: Paul May) .... Leutnant Herbert Asch
- 1956: Symphonie in Gold (Director: Franz Antel) .... Walter Gerlos
- 1956: Lumpaci the Vagabond (Director: Franz Antel) .... Johann Leim, Tischler
- 1956: Wenn Poldi ins Manöver zieht (Director: Hans Quest) .... Thomas
- 1957: Vater macht Karriere (Director: Carl Boese) .... Journalist Harry Greif
- 1957: Kleiner Mann – ganz groß (Director: Hans Grimm) .... Thomas Olderhoff
- 1957: Song of Naples (Director: Carlo Campogalliani) .... Franco Ferri
- 1957: Illusionen (TV Movie, Director: Kurt Wilhelm) .... Tom
- 1957: The Twins from Zillertal (Director: Harald Reinl) .... Franz von Auerstein
- 1957: Hafenmelodie (Director: Joachim Fuchsberger)
- 1958: Eva küßt nur Direktoren (Director: Rudolf Jugert) .... Karl Müller
- 1958: The Green Devils of Monte Cassino (Director: Harald Reinl) .... Lt. Reiter
- 1958: Liebe kann wie Gift sein (Director: Veit Harlan) .... Stefan Bruck
- 1958: U 47 – Kapitänleutnant Prien (Director: Harald Reinl) .... Oberleutnant Thomas Birkeneck
- 1958: The Girl with the Cat's Eyes (Director: Eugen York) .... Norbert Wilms
- 1958: My Sweetheart Is from Tyrol (Director: Hans Quest) .... Peter Weigand
- 1959: The Scarlet Baroness (Director: Rudolf Jugert) .... Tailor
- 1959: Der Frosch mit der Maske (Director: Harald Reinl) .... Richard Gordon
- 1959: Mein Schatz komm mit ans blaue Meer (Director: Rudolf Schündler) .... Direktor Paul Marzez
- 1960: Final Destination: Red Lantern (Director: Rudolf Jugert) .... Martin Stelling
- 1960: Die zornigen jungen Männer (Director: Wolf Rilla) .... Dr. Jürgen Faber
- 1960: The Terrible People (Director: Harald Reinl) .... Chefinspektor Long
- 1961: Zu viele Köche (TV miniseries about the detective Nero Wolfe, Director: Kurt Wilhelm) .... Archie Goodwin
- 1961: The Dead Eyes of London (Director: Alfred Vohrer) .... Inspektor Larry Holt
- 1961: The Devil's Daffodil (Director: Ákos Ráthonyi) .... Jack Tarling
- 1961: The Strange Countess (Director: Josef von Báky) .... Inspektor Michael 'Mike' Dorn
- 1961: Auf Wiedersehen (Director: Harald Philipp) .... Ferdinand Steinbichler
- 1962: The Carpet of Horror (Director: Harald Reinl) .... Harry Raffold
- 1962: The Inn on the River (Director: Alfred Vohrer) .... Insp. Wade
- 1962: Mystery Submarine (Director: C. M. Pennington-Richards) .... Cmdr. Scheffler
- 1963: Barras heute (Director: Paul May) .... Strafverteidiger
- 1963: The Curse of the Yellow Snake (Director: Franz Josef Gottlieb) .... Clifford Lynn
- 1963: The White Spider (Director: Harald Reinl) .... Ralph Hubbard
- 1963: The Black Abbot (Director: Franz Josef Gottlieb) .... Dick Alford
- 1964: Room 13 (Director: Harald Reinl) .... Johnny Gray
- 1964: Der Hexer (Director: Alfred Vohrer) .... Inspector Bryan Edgar Higgins
- 1965: Hotel of Dead Guests (Director: Eberhard Itzenplitz) .... Barney Blair
- 1965: The Last Tomahawk (Director: Harald Reinl) .... Captain Bill Hayward
- 1965: The Face of Fu Manchu (Director: Don Sharp) .... Carl Jannsen
- 1965: I Knew Her Well (Director: Antonio Pietrangeli) .... The Writer
- 1966: Who Killed Johnny R.? (Director: José Luis Madrid) .... Clyde Smith
- 1966: The Battle of the Mods (Director: Franco Montemurro) .... Robert B. Fuller
- 1966: Long Legs, Long Fingers (Director: Alfred Vohrer) .... Robert Hammond
- 1966: How to Seduce a Playboy (Director: Michael Pfleghar) .... Sokker
- 1967: Spy Today, Die Tomorrow (Director: Franz Josef Gottlieb) .... Army MP Haggan (uncredited)
- 1967: The College Girl Murders (Director: Alfred Vohrer) .... Inspektor Higgins
- 1967: Target Frankie (Director: José Antonio de la Loma) .... Frankie Bargher
- 1967: Der Tod läuft hinterher (TV miniseries, Director: Wolfgang Becker) .... Edward Morrison
- 1968: Im Banne des Unheimlichen (Director: Alfred Vohrer) .... Inspektor Higgins
- 1968: Commandos (Director: Armando Crispino) .... Oberleutnant Heitzel Agen - Professor
- 1969: Seven Days Grace (Director: Alfred Vohrer) .... Hendriks
- 1969: The Unnaturals (Director: Antonio Margheriti) .... Ben Taylor
- 1969: Hotel Royal (TV film, Director: Wolfgang Becker) .... Chris Norman
- 1970: 11 Uhr 20 (TV miniseries, Director: Wolfgang Becker) .... Thomas Wassem
- 1971: Heißer Sand (TV film, Director: Günter Gräwert) .... Jeff Barlow
- 1971: Olympia-Olympia (TV film, Director: Kurt Wilhelm) .... Schutzgeist
- 1972: What Have You Done to Solange? (Director: Massimo Dallamano) .... Inspector Barth
- 1972: Ein Käfer gibt Vollgas (Director: Rudolf Zehetgruber) .... Plato
- 1973: The Girl from Hong Kong (Director: Jürgen Roland) .... Frank Boyd
- 1973: The Flying Classroom (Director: Werner Jacobs) .... Dr. Johannes Böhk, gen. Justus
- 1977: Scrounged Meals (Director: Michael Verhoeven) .... Mitglied der Rock & Roll Jury
- 1982: Der Fan (Director: Eckhart Schmidt) .... Mann im Fernsehen / Man on TV
- 1996: Il grande fuoco (TV miniseries) – Director: Fabrizio Costa .... Earl Alessio Capilupi
- 1998: Il quarto re (TV film, Director: Stefano Reali) .... Baldassarre
- 1998: Il cuore e la spada (TV miniseries, Director: Fabrizio Costa) .... Marke
- 2007: Neues vom Wixxer (Director: Cyrill Boss and Philipp Stennert) .... Lord Dickham
- 2008: Bible Code (TV film, Director: Christoph Schrewe) .... Pope Innocent
- 2010: Live Is Life (TV film, Director: Wolfgang Murnberger) .... Degenhard Schagowetz
- 2013: Live Is Life 2 (TV film, Director: Wolfgang Murnberger) .... Degenhard Schagowetz (final film role)

== TV shows ==
- 1960–1961: Nur nicht nervös werden (ARD)
- 1973–1975: Der heiße Draht (SWF)
- 1975–1976: Spiel mit mir (SWF)
- 1977–1986: Auf Los geht's los (SWF)
- 1980–1991: Heut' abend (ARD)
- 1990–1994: Ja oder Nein (ARD)

== Documentation ==
- 1988–2003: Terra Australis (20 films by Fuchsberger about people and landscapes of his adopted country)
- 2011: Germaine Damar – Der tanzende Stern (TV) – Regie: Michael Wenk (Fuchsberger as interviewee commemorating his former film partner Germaine Damar)

== Audiobooks ==
- 2011: Altwerden ist nichts für Feiglinge. [Growing old is not for cowards] Publisher: Gütersloher Verlagshaus (Biography, read by Joachim Fuchsberger), ISBN 978-3-579-07634-8.
