= 08/15 (film) =

08/15 Teil 1: In der Kaserne
- Title still
- Directed by: Paul May
- Written by: Paul May; Hans Hellmut Kirst; Claus Hardt; Ernst von Salomon
- Based on: 08/15 by Hans Hellmut Kirst
- Produced by: Ilse Kubaschewski
- Cinematography: Heinz Hölscher
- Edited by: Walter Boos; Arnfried Heyne
- Music by: Rolf A. Wilhelm
- Production company: Divina-Film
- Distributed by: Gloria Filmverleih AG
- Release date: 30 September 1954
- Running time: 95 minutes
- Country: West Germany
- Language: German
- Box office: 6 million DM

08/15 is a 1954 West German film directed by Paul May. It is based on the novel 08/15 by Hans Hellmut Kirst, who also served as the film's screenwriter. The term 08/15 (nill-eight/fifteen, German: Null-Acht/Fünfzehn) refers to the German Army's standard machine gun, the 08/15 (or MG 08 model 15), by far the most common German machine gun deployed in World War I. Its tendency to jam led to its name becoming German Army slang for anything that went wrong. 08/15 is also the first part of the 08/15 film trilogy, hence it is also known as Teil 1: In der Kaserne (Part 1: In the Barracks).

== Plot ==
The movie opens in the barracks of an artillery battalion somewhere in Germany; the year is 1939. The enlisted men of the battery are harassed by their Hauptwachtmeister Schulz and a platoon leader, Feldwebel Platzek, at every opportunity. Gunner Vierbein, who has a passion for music and wanted to become a piano player, is a preferred target. This intensifies when Vierbein is ordered by Schulz to beat the carpets in Schulz's duty apartment and Schulz's wife, Lore, begins flirting with him. Even the squad leader Unteroffizier Lindenberg, who is known to be fair and correct, yields to pressure from Schulz and starts picking on Vierbein. He breaks down under the constant hard drill and harassment and steals ammunition on a rifle range to commit suicide. One of his comrades, Gefreiter Asch, who helps him to get along with the military life, prevents this and decides that the harassment by the NCOs cannot continue.

Asch, who is viewed as one of the best soldiers in the battery and highly valued by Schulz and the other NCOs, and his friend Obergefreiter Kowalski start to compromise their superiors one by one. Lindenberg is provoked to report Asch for insubordination, but Kowalski, who is named as witness, doesn't support the claim. The mess sergeant, Rumpler, reports Asch for mutiny when he controls the food and gets a result of unwarranted decrease. Rumpler withdraws his report when Schulz is threatening to inspect the kitchen food himself. Platzek tries to cover up the loss of the ammunition that Asch has kept, and though Asch helps him to falsify the documents he makes clear to Platzek that he is in his hands now. Later Asch and Kowalski use the ammunition to fire several shots into Schulz's office while Schulz and Platzek are in it.

Schulz, who recommended Asch for promotion to Unteroffizier himself, is unnerved because of the shooting and the constant reports about Asch, and relays the reports up to the battery commander, Hauptmann Derna. Derna refers Asch to the doctor, who declares him officially insane. Asch uses this diagnosis and threatens the doctor with a gun. Now the situation is so severe that Derna takes the reports to the battalion commander, Major Luschke. Luschke, severely unnerved by Derna and his inability to handle it himself, takes measures. He talks the officers and NCOs who reported Asch into withdrawing them by threat of demotion or transfer.

After that Asch is promoted to Unteroffizier, as the Major has already granted it before the reports began, and Kowalski is promoted to Stabsgefreiter. Only minutes later the battalion is falling in on the courtyard to hear Hitler's speech on the radio announcing the outbreak of war against Poland (and this is the start of World War II).

== Cast ==
- Joachim Fuchsberger as Private First Class Asch
- Peter Carsten as Lance Corporal Kowalski
- Paul Bösiger as Private Vierbein
- Emmerich Schrenk as First Sergeant Schulz
- Hans Christian Blech as Staff Sergeant Platzek
- Reinhard Glemnitz as Corporal Lindenberg
- Wilfried Seyferth as Major Luschke
- Helen Vita as Lore Schulz
- Mario Adorf (in his first role) as PFC Wagner
- Rainer Penkert as Leutnant Wedelmann
