= Margot Mahler =

German actress (1948–1997)

- Born: 24 September 1948; Straubing, Germany
- Died: 27 September 1997 (aged 49); Munich, Germany
- Other name: Margot Huber
- Occupation: Actress
- Years active: 1967-1997 (film & TV)

Margot Mahler (24 September 1948 – 27 September 1997) was a German film and television actress. She appeared in a number of sex comedies during the 1970s.

== Selected filmography ==
- Angels of the Street (1969)
- The Age of the Fish (1969, TV film)
- When You're With Me (1970)
- The Mad Aunts Strike Out (1971)
- Office Girls (1971)
- Holiday Report (1971)
- Who Laughs Last, Laughs Best (1971)
- The Disciplined Woman (1972)
- Don't Get Angry (1972)
- How Sweet Is Her Valley (1973)
- The East Frisian Report (1973)
- Blue Blooms the Gentian (1973)

== Bibliography ==
- Pym, John. Time Out Film Guide. Penguin Books, 2002.
