= August Rieger =

Austrian film director

- Born: 21 March 1914; Vienna, Austro-Hungarian Empire
- Died: 3 September 1984 (aged 70); Feldafing, Bavaria, West Germany
- Occupations: Director, Screenwriter, Producer
- Years active: 1951–1980 (film)

August Rieger (1914–1984) was an Austrian screenwriter and film director. He worked in the Austrian and later the West German film industry.

== Selected filmography ==
- The Fall of Valentin (1951)
- If I Only Have Your Love (1953)
- The Blue Danube (1955)
- The Doctor's Secret (1955)
- Forest Liesel (1956)
- Her Corporal (1956)
- Imperial and Royal Field Marshal (1956)
- Candidates for Marriage (1958)
- Hello Taxi (1958)
- Girls for the Mambo-Bar (1959)
- Der Orgelbauer von St. Marien (1961)
- Das Mädel aus dem Böhmerwald (1965)
- Always Trouble with the Teachers (1968)
- Peter und Sabine (1968)
- Help, I Love Twins (1969)
- The Seven Red Berets (1969)
- The Young Tigers of Hong Kong (1969)
- When the Mad Aunts Arrive (1970)
- The Vampire Happening (1971)
- Sharks on Board (1971)
- Charley's Nieces (1974)
- Revenge of the East Frisians (1974)
- Monika and the Sixteen Year Olds (1975)

== Bibliography ==
- Fritsche, Maria. Homemade Men In Postwar Austrian Cinema: Nationhood, Genre and Masculinity . Berghahn Books, 2013.
- Goble, Alan. The Complete Index to Literary Sources in Film. Walter de Gruyter, 1999.
