= Love in 3-D =

1973 film by Walter Boos

- Directed by: Walter Boos
- Written by: Florian Vollmer
- Produced by: Wolf C. Hartwig
- Starring: Ingrid Steeger; Evelyn Raess; Christina Lindberg
- Cinematography: Klaus Werner
- Edited by: Herbert Taschner
- Distributed by: Monarch Releasing Corporation; Dimension Pictures
- Release date: 26 January 1973
- Running time: 93 minutes
- Country: West Germany
- Language: German (dubbed into English)

Love in 3-D (German: Liebe in drei Dimensionen) is a 1973 German adult comedy film directed by Walter Boos.

The film was dubbed into English for American audiences. As compared to other mid-1970s adult films that were shot in 3-D, Love in 3-D stands out for several reasons. It was shot on 70 mm, very unusual for a low budget adult film. The movie itself contains several notable 3-D scenes which show everything from oranges, water, tree branches, swings, and breasts thrust out toward the audience. One standout (non-adult) sequence involves a spider during a ride in an old ghost house.

== Synopsis ==
The story revolves around Petra, a naive 17 year old girl, who rents her sister Dagmar's apartment in Munich, and the sexual escapades of the other residents of the apartment block.

== Cast ==
- Ingrid Steeger - Petra
- Evelyn Raess - Dagmar
- Christina Lindberg - Inge
- Achim Neumann - Manfred
- Dorit Henke - Anita
- Nico Wolferstetter - Udo
- Dorothea Rau - Fanny
- Rinaldo Talamonti - Enrico
- Elisabeth Volkmann - Rosi
- Ulrike Butz - Lissy
- Konstantin Wecker - Rudi
- Rosl Mayr - Frau Huber
