= Charley's Nieces =

1974 film by Walter Boos

- Directed by: Walter Boos
- Written by: Valentin Gorlov; August Rieger
- Starring: Josef Moosholzer; Bertram Edelmann; Massimo E. Melis
- Cinematography: Werner Kurz
- Production company: TV13 Filmproduktion
- Distributed by: Constantin Film; Boxoffice International Pictures
- Release date: 10 May 1974
- Running time: 75 minutes
- Country: West Germany
- Language: German

Charley's Nieces (German: Charlys Nichten) is a 1974 West German comedy film directed by Walter Boos and starring Josef Moosholzer, Bertram Edelmann and Massimo E. Melis. The film's title is a reference to Brandon Thomas's farce Charley's Aunt. It is also known by the alternative title of Confessions of a Sexy Photographer.

== Synopsis ==
Three men disguise themselves as women in order to get jobs in a photographer's studio.

== Cast ==
- Josef Moosholzer as Max
- Bertram Edelmann as Stefan
- Massimo E. Melis as Luigi
- Karel Otto as Charly Braun
- Elke Boltenhagen as Gerlinde
- Eva Gross as Resi
- Patrizia Viotti as Claude
- Orchidea de Santis as Dominique
- Jean-Marie Dany as Li
- Florian Endlicher as Jackyboy
- Elisabeth Volkmann as Berta Schwarzkopf
- Günther Kieslich as Albert Schwarzkopf
- Nico Wolferstetter as Kurt Hellwig
- Josef Fröhlich as Johann
- Edgar Wenzel as Konrad
- Marie Luise Lusewitz as Anna
- Rosl Mayr as Frau Boesig
- Ulrich Beiger as Dr. Stingl
- Susanne Baer as Bernhardina
- Hartmut Neugebauer as Knall
- Anneliese Groebl as Dicke
- Willy Schultes as Gerichtsvollzieher
- Felicitas Peters as Kundin von Stefan
- Doris Delaas as Kundin
- Elke Deuringer as Kundin
- Heinz Kopitz as Johannas Freund
- Ursula Reit as Krankenschwester

== Bibliography ==
- Leslie Y. Rabkin. The Celluloid Couch: An Annotated International Filmography of the Mental Health Professional in the Movies and Television, from the Beginning to 1990. Scarecrow Press, 1998.
