= Emmerich Schrenk =

Austrian actor

- Born: 2 November 1915; Vienna, Austria-Hungary
- Died: 2 October 1988 (aged 72); Vienna, Austria
- Occupation: Actor
- Years active: 1949-1983

Emmerich Schrenk (2 November 1915 - 2 October 1988) was an Austrian actor. He appeared in more than fifty films from 1949 to 1983.

== Filmography ==
Year	Title	Role	Notes
1949	Liebling der Welt		
1949	Duel with Death	Dietz, Sturmführer der SS	
1951	Spring on Ice	Flugbeamter	Uncredited
1951	Der Fünfminutenvater	Bartender	
1951	The Merry Farmer		
1953	The Last Reserves	Pucher	
1953	The Spendthrift		
1954	08/15	Hauptwachtmeister Schulz	
1955	08/15 – Part 2	Hauptwachtmeister Schulz	
1955	08/15 at Home	Hauptwachtmeister Schulz	
1956	The Hunter from Roteck		
1956	Wo der Wildbach rauscht	Wolf, der Großknecht	
1957	Der Wilderer vom Silberwald		
1957	Der Pfarrer von St. Michael	Franz Santner	
1958	Endangered Girls	Mario Cortez	
1958	Blitzmädels an die Front	SD-Führer	
1958	U 47 – Kapitänleutnant Prien		
1958	Unruhige Nacht		
1958	Einmal noch die Heimat seh'n	Alois	
1958	The Girl with the Cat's Eyes	Wühles	
1959	Arzt ohne Gewissen	Kriminalassistent Pastor	
1959	The Cow and I	SS-Offizier #1	Uncredited
1960	Frauen in Teufels Hand	Obersturmführer Schmielke	
1960	Wegen Verführung Minderjähriger	Direktor Dr. Kräh	
1961	Lebensborn	Obersturmbannführer Meyer-Westroff	
1961	Der Orgelbauer von St. Marien	Gutsverwalter Marek	
1962	He Can't Stop Doing It	Joshua	
1963	Barras heute	Direktor Pasch	
1963	The Black Cobra	Freddy	
1964	Cave of the Living Dead	Thomas	
1965	DM-Killer	Police Officer Böll	Uncredited
1965	St. Pauli Herbertstraße	Geschäftsführer des Varietés	
1969	Donnerwetter! Donnerwetter! Bonifatius Kiesewetter	Andreas Bock	
1972	Sie nannten ihn Krambambuli	Reißer	
1976	Der Winter, der ein Sommer war		
