= Gitta Lind =

German actress

- Born: Rita Maria Gracher; 17 April 1925; Trier, Rhineland-Palatinate, Germany
- Died: 9 November 1974 (aged 49); Tutzing, Bavaria, West Germany
- Occupations: Actress, singer
- Years active: 1953–1964 (film)

Gitta Lind (17 April 1925 – 9 November 1974) was a German singer and film actress.

== Biography ==
Lind was born in Trier as Rita Maria Gracher. During her first employment as a singer she changed her name to Gitta Lind, a tribute to Gitta Alpár and Jenny Lind. She was married four times, in her second marriage from 1951 to 1954 to the actor Joachim Fuchsberger. She died in Tutzing and was buried in Trier.

== Selected filmography ==
- Hit Parade (1953)
- Scandal at the Girls' School (1953)
- Marriage Impostor (1954)
- The Perfect Couple (1954)
- Music in the Blood (1955)
- My Wife Makes Music (1958)

== Bibliography ==
- Feinstein, Joshua (2002). The Triumph of the Ordinary: Depictions of Daily Life in the East German Cinema, 1949–1989. Chapel Hill: University of North Carolina Press. ISBN 978-0-8078-5385-6.
