= Omer Bartov =

Israeli-American historian (born 1954)

- עֹמֶר בַּרְטוֹב
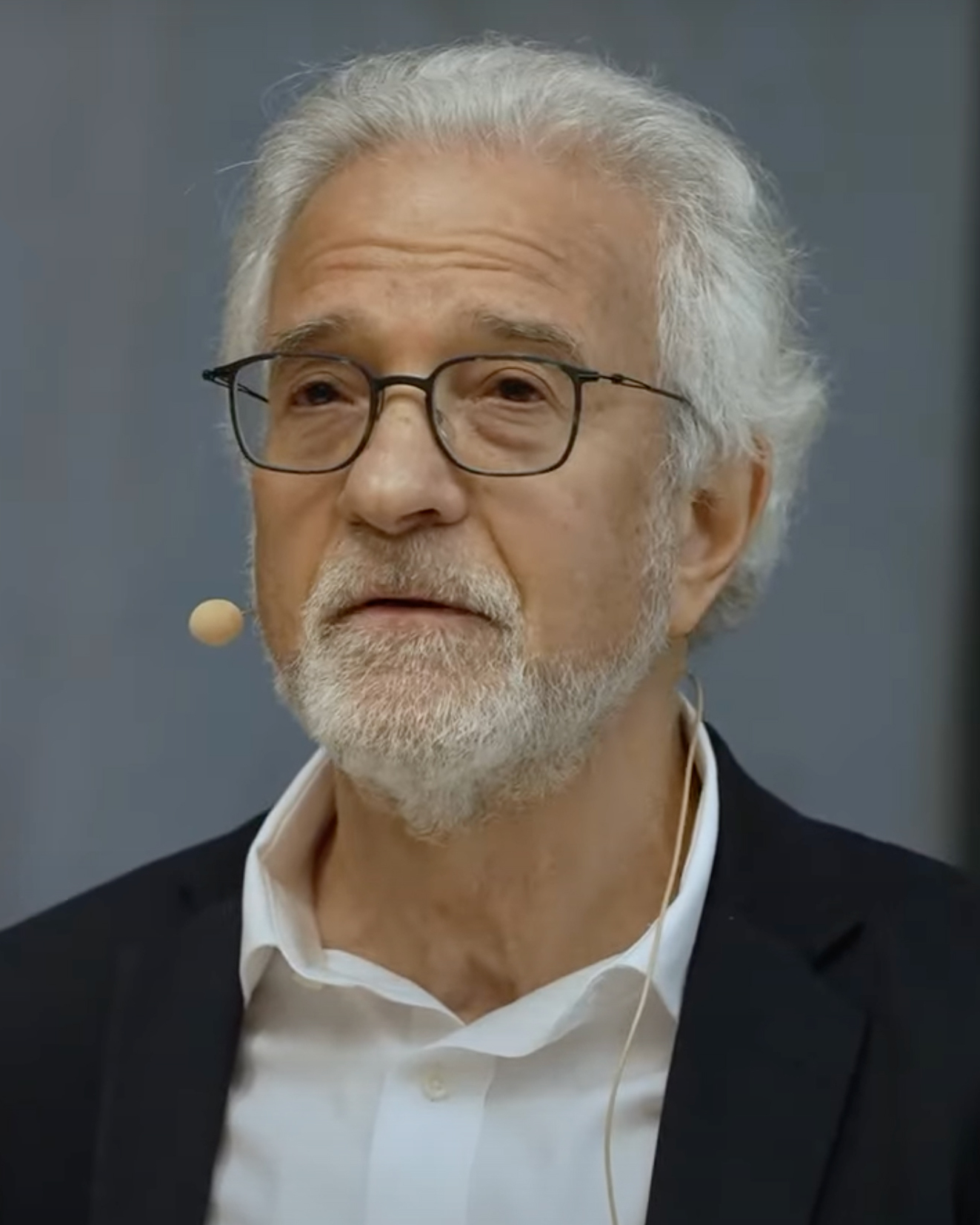
- Bartov in 2022
- Born: April 17, 1954 (age 72); Ein HaHoresh, Israel
- Education: University of Tel Aviv (BA); St Antony's College, Oxford (MA, DPhil)
- Known for: Holocaust studies
- Military career
- Branch: Israel Defense Forces
- Conflicts: Yom Kippur War

Omer Bartov (Hebrew: עֹמֶר בַּרְטוֹב [ʔoˈmeʁ ˈbaʁtov]; born April 17, 1954) is an Israeli-American historian. He is the Dean's Professor of Holocaust and Genocide Studies at Brown University, where he has taught since 2000. Bartov is a historian of the Holocaust and is considered a leading authority on genocide.

== Early life and education ==
Omer Bartov was born in 1954 in Ein HaHoresh, Israel. His father, Hanoch Bartov, was an author and journalist whose parents immigrated to Mandatory Palestine from Poland before Hanoch was born. Bartov's mother immigrated to Mandatory Palestine from Buczacz, Poland (now Buchach, Ukraine), in the mid-1930s. Bartov's parents were Zionists and fought in the 1948 Palestine war.

Bartov fought in the 1973 Yom Kippur War as a company commander. In 1976, he and a score of other soldiers were severely wounded in a training accident due to a commander's negligence, which Bartov says the Israel Defense Forces (IDF) covered up. Bartov was educated at Tel Aviv University and obtained a D.Phil. from St Antony's College, Oxford, with a doctoral thesis on the Nazi indoctrination of the German army and its crimes on the Eastern front during World War II. (Note: Bartov recalls some of his research: "As my research had shown, even before their conscription, young German men had internalised core elements of Nazi ideology, especially the view that the subhuman Slav masses, led by insidious Bolshevik Jews, were threatening Germany and the rest of the civilised world with destruction, and that therefore Germany had the right and duty to create for itself a 'living space' in the east and to decimate or enslave that region's population. This worldview was then further inculcated into the troops, so that by the time they marched into the Soviet Union they perceived their enemies through that prism.")

== Career ==
Bartov has taught in the United States since 1989. He was a junior fellow at the Harvard Society of Fellows from 1989 to 1992. In 1984, he was a visiting fellow at Princeton University's Davis Center for Historical Studies. From 1992 to 2000, Bartov taught at Rutgers University, where he held the Raoul Wallenberg Professorship in Human Rights. At Rutgers, he was also a Senior Fellow at the Rutgers Center for Historical Analysis. Bartov joined the faculty of Brown University in 2000. He was elected a member of the American Academy of Arts and Sciences in 2005.

As a historian, Bartov is best known for his studies of the German Army in World War II. He has challenged the myth of the clean Wehrmacht, the popular view that the German Army was an apolitical force that had little involvement in war crimes or crimes against humanity, arguing that the Heer was a deeply Nazi institution that played a key role in the Holocaust in the occupied areas of the Soviet Union. He has also written extensively about Jewish life in Galicia. Bartov served on the editorial board of Yad Vashem Studies for two decades, but quit during the Gaza war because he felt his colleagues on the journal were of the opinion that "the killing and maiming of thousands of children is either none of its business or perfectly justified".

== Political views ==
In 2015, Bartov and numerous other historians signed an open letter by historian David R. Marples to Ukrainian President Petro Poroshenko urging him not to sign the decommunization laws, which declared Ukrainian Insurgent Army members and some other nationalists who had participated in the Holocaust to be "Heroes of Ukraine". In August 2023, Bartov was one of more than 1,500 U.S., Israeli, Jewish and Palestinian academics and public figures to sign an open letter saying that Israel operates "a regime of apartheid" in the occupied Palestinian territories and calling on U.S. Jewish groups to speak out against the occupation in Palestine. Bartov said that the thirty-seventh government of Israel brought "a very radical shift", adding, "I am a historian of the 20th century and don't make analogies lightly" before recounting how "once-fringe political movements managed entry into ruling governments and got their hands on the levers of power", and emphasizing: "This is the current moment in Israel. It's terrifying to see it happening."

In January 2024, Bartov said that Israel had repeatedly expressed genocidal intent against the Palestinians in the Gaza Strip during the Gaza war. By August of that year, having visited Israel again in June, Bartov said it "was engaged in systematic war crimes, crimes against humanity and genocidal actions". (Note: In August 2024, Bartov wrote in The Guardian: "By the time I travelled to Israel, I had become convinced that at least since the attack by the IDF on Rafah on 6 May 2024, it was no longer possible to deny that Israel was engaged in systematic war crimes, crimes against humanity and genocidal actions. It was not just that this attack against the last concentration of Gazans – most of them displaced already several times by the IDF, which now once again pushed them to a so-called safe zone – demonstrated a total disregard of any humanitarian standards. It also clearly indicated that the ultimate goal of this entire undertaking from the very beginning had been to make the entire Gaza Strip uninhabitable, and to debilitate its population to such a degree that it would either die out or seek all possible options to flee the territory. In other words, the rhetoric spouted by Israeli leaders since 7 October was now being translated into reality – namely, as the 1948 UN Genocide Convention puts it, that Israel was acting 'with intent to destroy, in whole or in part', the Palestinian population in Gaza, 'as such, by killing, causing serious harm, or inflicting conditions of life meant to bring about the group's destruction'.") On April 24, 2025, Bartov said: "It's a misnomer to call it a 'war'. ... This is an occupation by the IDF designed to take over Gaza. There will, of course, be resistance, but it will be guerrilla resistance." He also noted the violence had escalated beyond Gaza to include the West Bank. In July 2025, Bartov wrote an essay in The New York Times in which he argued that Israel is committing genocide against the Palestinian people and noted that other experts in genocide studies had reached the same conclusion.

== Personal life ==
Bartov lives in Cambridge, Massachusetts. In 1993, he married Wai-yee Li, a Chinese literature professor at Harvard University. They have two children. Bartov also has a son who lives in Tel Aviv.

== Works ==
- The Eastern Front, 1941–1945: German Troops and the Barbarization of Warfare, Palgrave Macmillan, 2001
- Historians on the Eastern Front: Andreas Hillgruber and Germany's Tragedy, pages 325–345 from Tel Aviver Jahrbuch für deutsche Geschichte, volume 16, 1987
- Hitler's Army: Soldiers, Nazis, and War in the Third Reich, Oxford Paperbacks, 1992
- Hitlers Wehrmacht. Soldaten, Fanatismus und die Brutalisierung des Krieges. (German edition) ISBN 3-499-60793-X.
- Murder in Our Midst: The Holocaust, Industrial Killing, and Representation, Oxford University Press, 1996
- Mirrors of Destruction: War, Genocide, and Modern Identity, Oxford University Press, 2002
- Germany's War and the Holocaust: Disputed Histories, Cornell University Press, 2003
- The "Jew" in Cinema: From The Golem to Don't Touch My Holocaust, Indiana University Press, 2005
- Erased: Vanishing Traces of Jewish Galicia in Present-Day Ukraine, Princeton University Press, 2007 (ISBN 978-0-691-13121-4). Paperback 2015 (ISBN 9780691166551).
- Anatomy of a Genocide: The Life and Death of a Town Called Buczacz, Simon & Schuster, 2018
- Tales from the Borderlands: Making and Unmaking the Galician Past, Yale University Press, 2022
- The Butterfly and the Axe, Amsterdam Publishers, 2023
- Genocide, the Holocaust and Israel-Palestine: First-Person History in Times of Crisis, Bloomsbury Academic, 2023
- Israel: What Went Wrong?, Farrar, Straus and Giroux, 2026. ISBN 978-0374618186. OCLC 1514991355.

=== Essays ===
- "Eastern Europe as the Site of Genocide". The Journal of Modern History. 80 (3): 557–593. 2008. doi:10.1086/589591.
- "Indoctrination and Motivation in the Wehrmacht: The Importance of the Unquantifiable", Journal of Strategic Studies, vol. 9, no. 1, pp. 16–34, 1986, doi:10.1080/01402398608437246
- "Historians on the Eastern Front: Andreas Hillgruber and Germany's Tragedy", Tel Aviver Jahrbuch für deutsche Geschichte, vol. 16, Tel Aviv, pp. 325–345, 1987
- "Daily Life and Motivation in War: The Wehrmacht in the Soviet Union", Journal of Strategic Studies, vol. 12, no. 2, pp. 200–214, 198, doi:10.1080/01402398908437372
- "The Missing Years: German Workers, German Soldiers", German History, vol. 8, pp. 46–65, 1990, doi:10.1093/gh/8.1.46
- "Soldiers, Nazis, and War in the Third Reich", The Journal of Modern History, vol. 63, no. 1, pp. 44–60, 1991, JSTOR 2938525
- "Time Present and Time Past: The Historikerstreit and German Reunification", New German Critique, no. 55, pp. 173–190, 1992, doi:10.2307/488296, JSTOR 488296
- "The Conduct of War: Soldiers and the Barbarization of Warfare", The Journal of Modern History, vol. 64, pp. Beilage 32–45, 1992, doi:10.1086/244426, JSTOR 2124967
- "Review: Mein Krieg by Hans Georg Ulrich, Harriet Eder, Thomas Kufus", The American Historical Review, vol. 97, no. 4, pp. 1155–1157, 1992, doi:10.1086/ahr/97.4.1155, JSTOR 2165505
- "Time Present and Time Past: The Historikerstreit and German Reunification", New German Critique, vol. 55, no. 55, pp. 173–190, 1992, doi:10.2307/488296, JSTOR 488296
- "Intellectuals on Auschwitz: Memory, History, and Truth", History and Memory, vol. 5, no. 1, pp. 87–129, 1993, JSTOR 25618643
- "Wem gehört die Geschichte? Wehrmacht und Geschichtswissenschaft", Mittelweg, vol. 36, no. 3–5, pp. 5–21, 1994, ISSN 2364-7825
- Ian Kershaw and Moshe Lewin (ed.), "From Blitzkrieg to Total War: Controversial Links between Image and Reality." Chapter. In , edited by, . Cambridge: 1997.", Stalinism and Nazism: Dictatorships in Comparison, Cambridge: Cambridge University Press, pp. 158–184
- Joel Blatt, ed. (1997), "Martyrs' Vengeance: Memory, Trauma, and Fear of War in France, 1918–1940", The French Defeat of 1940: Reassessments, New York / Oxford: Berghahn Books, pp. 54–84, doi:10.1515/9780857457172-005, ISBN 978-1-57181-226-1
- "German Soldiers and the Holocaust: Historiography, Research and Implications", History and Memory, vol. 9, no. 1/2, pp. 162–188, 1997, JSTOR 25681004
- "Chambers of Horror: Holocaust Museums in Israel and the United States", Israel Studies, vol. 2, no. 2, pp. 66–87, 1997, doi:10.1353/is.2005.0049
- "Defining Enemies, Making Victims: Germans, Jews, and the Holocaust", The American Historical Review, vol. 103, no. 3, pp. 771–816, 1998, doi:10.2307/2650572, JSTOR 2650572
- "The Proof of Ignominy: Vichy France's Past and Presence", Contemporary European History, vol. 7, no. 1, pp. 107–131, 1998, doi:10.1017/S0960777300004781
- "Widerschein der Zerstörung. Krieg, Genozid und moderne Identität", Zeitschrift für Genozidforschung, vol. 1, no. 1, pp. 46–69, 1999, doi:10.5771/1438-8332-1999-1-46
- "Germany as Victim", New German Critique, no. 29, pp. 29–40, 2000, doi:10.2307/488631, JSTOR 488631
- From the Holocaust in Galicia to Contemporary Genocide: Common Ground - Historical Differences. The Joseph and Rebecca Meyerhoff Annual Lecture at the United States Holocaust Memorial Museum: Center for Advanced Holocaust Studies (PDF), December 17, 2002
- "The European Imagination in the Age of Total War", The Holocaust: Theoretical Readings, Edinburgh: Edinburgh University Press, pp. 89–95, 2003, doi:10.1515/9781474470230-015
- "The Holocaust as 'Leitmotif' of the Twentieth Century". In: Zeitgeschichte. 31. Jahrgang, Nr. 5 (2004), S. 315–326.
- Erickson, Mark; Erickson, Ljubica, eds. (2005), "Celluloid Soldiers", Russia: War, Peace and Diplomacy: Essays in Honour of John Erickson, London: Weidenfeld & Nicolson, pp. 89–95, ISBN 9780297849131, OCLC 56805979
- "Weiße Stellen und schwarze Löcher: Vergangenheit und Gegenwart in Ostgalizien" (PDF), Journal of German-Jewish Literature and Cultural History, vol. 1, no. 2, pp. 155–194, 2007
- "Eastern Europe as the Site of Genocide", The Journal of Modern History, vol. 80, no. 3, pp. 557–593, 2008, doi:10.1086/589591
- "Друга світова війна як виклик для української історіографії" (PDF), Ukraine Moderna (World War II as a challenge for Ukrainian historiography) (in Ukrainian), vol. 13, no. 2, pp. 13–60, 2008
- Communal Genocide: Personal Accounts of the Destruction of Buczacz, Eastern Galicia, 1941-1944. 7th Annual Hugo Valentin lecture (PDF), Upsala: Uppsala University, March 9, 2009, pp. 399–420
- Дискомфортне читання: відповідь моїм критикам (Uncomfortable reading: a response to my critics. Jewish heritage in Ukraine and representations of the Holocaust: discussion of the book “The Forgotten” by Omer Bartov) (in Ukrainian), pp. 326–347
- "למחוק ולשכוח: שרידים אחרונים של גליציה היהודית באוקראינה בת-ימינו", Zmanim: A Historical Quarterly. - 2008. - №103 (Delete and forget: The last remnants of Jewish Galicia in present-day Ukraine) (in Hebrew), no. 103, pp. 14–27, 2008
- David Elliot Cohen, ed. (2008), "Images of Genocide: How Should We Respond?" with Photographs by Magnum Photos", What Matters: The World's Preeminent Photojournalists Ad Thinkers Depict Essential Issues of Our Time, New York / London: Sterling, pp. 83–97, ISBN 978-1402758348
- Jolanta Ambrosewicz-Jacobs, ed. (2009), "My Twisted Way to Buczacz", The Holocaust. Voices of Scholars, Krakau: Jabiellonian University, pp. 95–105
- Michele Rivkin-Fish und Elena Trubina, ed. (2010), "From Buchach to Sheikh Muwannis: Building the Future and Erasing the Past" (PDF), Dilemmas of Diversity After the Cold War: Analyses of "Cultural Difference", Washington D.C.: Woodrow Wilson International Center for Scholars, pp. 50–79, ISBN 978-1-933549-92-7
- Eric Langenbacher and Yossi Shain, ed. (2010), "September 11 in the Rearview Mirror: Contemporary Policies and Perceptions of the Past", Power and the Past: Collective Memory and International Relations, Washington: Georgetown University Press, pp. 147–160, ISBN 978-1-58901-640-8, JSTOR j.ctt2tt597.9
- "The Question of Genocide in Palestine, 1948: An Exchange between Martin Shaw and Omer Bartov", Journal of Genocide Research, vol. 12, no. 3–4, pp. 243–259, 2010, doi:10.1080/14623528.2010.529698
- "Wartime Lies and Other Testimonies: Jewish-Christian Relationships in Buczacz, 1939-44," 25, no. 3 (August 2011)" (PDF), East European Politics and Societies, vol. 25, no. 3, pp. 486–511, 2011, doi:10.1177/0888325411398918
- "Review of Bloodlands: Europe between Hitler and Stalin. By Timothy Snyder" (PDF), Slavic Review, vol. 70, no. 2, pp. 424–428, 2011
- "Moshe Lewin's Century", Kritika - Explorations in Russian and Eurasian History, vol. 12, no. 1, pp. 115–122, 2011, doi:10.1353/kri.2011.a411662
- "Guilt and Accountability in the Postwar Courtroom: The Holocaust in Czortków and Buczacz, East Galicia, as Seen in West German Legal Discourse" (PDF), Historical Reflections, vol. 39, no. 2, pp. 96–123, 2013, JSTOR j.ctv47wb5x.5
- Norman J. W. Goda, ed. (2014), "The Voice of Your Brother's Blood: Reconstructing Genocide on the Local Level" (PDF), Jewish Histories of the Holocaust: New Transnational Approaches, New York: Berghahn Books, pp. 105–134, doi:10.1515/9781782384427-008
- Hilary Earl and Karl A. Schleunes, ed. (2014), "Genocide and the Holocaust: Arguments over History and Politics", Lessons and Legacies XI: Expanding Perspectives on the Holocaust in a Changing World, Evanston: Northwestern University Press, pp. 5–28, doi:10.2307/j.ctv47wb5x.5, ISBN 978-0810130913
- Fogu, Claudio; Kansteiner, Wulf; Presner, Todd, eds. (2016), "The Holocaust as Genocide: Experiential Uniqueness and Integrated History", in C. Fogu, W. Kansteiner & T. Presner", Probing the Ethics of Holocaust Culture, Cambridge: Harvard University Press, pp. 319–331, ISBN 978-0-674-97051-9
- Dan Diner, ed. (2016), ""Buczacz," (Leiden: NV, 2016)", Enzyklopädie jüdischer Geschichte und Kultur Online, Leiden: Koninklijke Brill
- Robert Gellately, ed. (2017), "The Holocaust", in R. Gellately, ed., pp. 213-241" (PDF), The Oxford Illustrated History of the Third Reich, Oxford: Oxford University Press, pp. 213–241, ISBN 978-0-19-872828-3
- Antony Polonsky, Hanna Węgrzynek und Andrzej Żbikowski, ed. (2018), "The Truth and Nothing But: The Holocaust Gallery of the Warsaw POLIN Museum in Context." In, edited by , 111–18.", New Directions in the History of the Jews in the Polish Lands, Academic Studies Press, JSTOR j.ctv7xbrh4.17
- Bashir Bashir und Amos Goldberg, ed. (2018), "National Narratives of Suffering and Victimhood: Methods and Ethics of Telling the Past as Personal Political History" (PDF), The Holocaust and the Nakba: A New Grammar of Trauma and History, New York: Columbia University Press, pp. 187–206, doi:10.7312/bash18296-011, ISBN 978-0-231-54448-1
- "Response to Ab Imperio Forum", Ab Imperio, vol. 2019, no. 2, pp. 157–183, 2019, doi:10.1353/imp.2019.0036
- "The Return of the Displaced: Ironies of the Jewish-Palestinian Nexus, 1939-1949" (PDF), Jewish Social Studies, vol. 24, no. 3, pp. 26–50, 2019
- "Interrupted Work. Tales from Half-Asia. Small-Town Galicians Encounter the World" (PDF), Prooftexts, vol. 37, no. 3, pp. 469–496
- "What is the Environmental History of the Holocaust?", Journal of Genocide Research, vol. 23, no. 2, pp. 419–428, 2021, doi:10.1080/14623528.2021.1924587
- "Blind spots of genocide", Journal of Modern European History, vol. 19, no. 4, pp. 395–399, 2021, doi:10.1177/16118944211055040
- "Antisemitism in History and Politics", Antisemitism Studies, vol. 6, no. 1, pp. 100–114, 2022, doi:10.2979/antistud.6.1.05
- "The Life and Death of the Shtetl", The Journal of Holocaust Research, vol. 36, no. 1, pp. 89–95, 2022, doi:10.1080/25785648.2021.2018845
- Bashir Bashir und Amos Goldberg, ed. (2022), "National Narratives of Suffering and Victimhood: Methods and Ethics of Telling the Past as Personal Political History", The Holocaust and the Nakba: A New Grammar of Trauma and History (PDF), New York Chichester / West Sussex: Columbia University Press, pp. 187–206, doi:10.7312/bash18296-011, ISBN 978-3-030-94916-7
- Elazar Barkan, Ariella Lang, ed. (2022), "Criminalizing Denial as a Form of Erasure: The Polish-Ukrainian-Israeli Triangle", Memory Laws and Historical Justice, Cham: Palgrave Macmillan, pp. 195–221, doi:10.1007/978-3-030-94914-3_8, ISBN 978-3-030-94913-6
- Emmanuel Dalle Mulle, Davide Rodogno und Mona Bieling, ed. (2023), "The Difference Nationalism Makes: Jews and Others in the Twentieth Century", Sovereignty, Nationalism, and the Quest for Homogeneity in Interwar Europe, London: Bloomsbury Academic, pp. 283–295, doi:10.5040/9781350263413.ch-14, ISBN 978-1-350-26337-6
- Cathie Carmichael, Matthew D’Auria und Aviel Roshwald, ed. (2023), "Nationalism, Ethnic Cleansing, and Genocide: A View from Below", The Cambridge History of Nationhood and Nationalism, Cambridge: Cambridge University Press, pp. 578–596, doi:10.1017/9781108551458.029, ISBN 978-1-108-42706-7
- "Should There Be One Universal Narrative for Remembering the Holocaust? On a Universal Narrative of the Holocaust and Remembering the Past in Ukraine", Eastern European Holocaust Studies, vol. 1, no. 1, pp. 13–16, 2023, doi:10.1515/eehs-2023-0005

=== Awards ===
- 1995: Fraenkel Prize in Contemporary History from the Institute for Contemporary History and Wiener Library, London, for Murder in Our Midst
- 2018: National Jewish Book Award in the Holocaust category for Anatomy of a Genocide: The Life and Death of a Town Called Buczacz
- 2018: Zócalo Book Prize for Anatomy of a Genocide: The Life and Death of a Town Called Buczacz
- 2019: Yad Vashem International Book Prize for Holocaust Research for Anatomy of a Genocide: The Life and Death of a Town Called Buczacz

== Selected honors and awards ==
- Fellow, Center for Advanced Study in the Behavioral Sciences, Stanford, California
- Berlin Prize Fellowship, American Academy in Berlin, Spring semester 2007
- Fellow of the American Academy of Arts and Sciences, (2005)
- John Simon Guggenheim Fellowship (2003–2004)
- Radcliffe Institute for Advanced Study Fellow, Harvard University (2002–2003)
- National Endowment for the Humanities Fellowship for University Teachers (1996–97)
- Alexander von Humboldt Fellow, Germany and France (1985–86, 1987, 1990, 1994)
- French Government Scholarship at the FIAP Language School in Paris, France (1985)
- Rothschild Foundation Scholarship (Rothschild Fellowship) in support of studies at Oxford University (1981–82)
