= Walter Boos =

German film editor and director (1928–1996)

- Born: 22 November 1928; Munich, Germany
- Died: 22 November 1996 (aged 68); Grünwald, Germany
- Occupations: Editor, Director
- Years active: 1948–1981 (film)

Walter Boos (1928–1996) was a German film editor and director.

== Selected filmography ==
=== Editor ===
- Everything Will Be Better in the Morning (1948)
- Martina (1949)
- Who Drove the Grey Ford? (1950)
- Hanna Amon (1951)
- Monks, Girls and Hungarian Soldiers (1952)
- Stars Over Colombo (1953)
- The Blue Hour (1953)
- The Prisoner of the Maharaja (1954)
- 08/15 (1954)
- Fear (1954)
- The Golden Plague (1954)
- Prisoners of Love (1954)
- Fruit in the Neighbour's Garden (1956)
- The Old Forester House (1956)
- Where the Ancient Forests Rustle (1956)
- The Crammer (1958)
- Lilli (1958)
- Dorothea Angermann (1959)
- My Schoolfriend (1960)
- Town Without Pity (1961)
- Murder Party (1961)
- Max the Pickpocket (1962)
- He Can't Stop Doing It (1962)
- My Daughter and I (1963)
- Coffin from Hong Kong (1964)
- Situation Hopeless... But Not Serious (1965)
- Schulmädchen-Report (1970)

=== Director ===
- Nurse Report (1972)
- Love in 3-D (1973)
- The East Frisian Report (1973)
- Charley's Nieces (1974)
- Revenge of the East Frisians (1974)
- Inn of the Sinful Daughters (1978)

== Bibliography ==
- Peter Brunette. Roberto Rossellini. University of California Press, 1996.
