= Reinhard Glemnitz =

German actor

Reinhard Glemnitz (born 27 November 1930 in Breslau, Germany (now Wrocław, Poland)) is a German television actor.

== Partial filmography ==
- 08/15 (1954) - Unteroffizier Lindenberg
- Love's Carnival (1955) - Leutnant Harald Hofmann
- Arzt ohne Gewissen (1959)
- My Schoolfriend (1960) - Geldbriefträger (uncredited)
- Schick Deine Frau nicht nach Italien (1960) - Narrator (voice, uncredited)
- Mission to Hell (1964) - Journalist (uncredited)
- Condemned to Sin (1964) - Anstaltsleiter
- Die Schlüssel (1965, TV Mini-Series) - Norman Stansdale
- Der Tod läuft hinterher (1967, TV Mini-Series) - Piccaud
- Der Kommissar (1969–1976, TV Series) - Robert Heines
- Office Girls (1971) - Rechtsanwalt
- Love Is Only a Word (1971) - Butler Leo (voice, uncredited)
- Only the Wind Knows the Answer (1974) - Dr. Friese (voice, uncredited)
- Crime After School (1975) - Narrator (voice, uncredited)
- Wallenstein (1978, TV Mini-Series) - Aldringen
- Bloodline (1979) - Roffe Chauffeur
- Graf Dracula in Oberbayern (1979) - Playboy-Herausgeber / Hotelgast Bombeck / Werbesprecher (voice, uncredited)
- Der Millionenbauer (1979–1988, TV Series) - Ernst Scheubel
- Heiße Kartoffeln (1980) - Herr Bussark
- Shalom Pharao (1982) - Ruben (voice)
- Deep Water (1983, TV Series) - Dirk Weisberg
- The Wannsee Conference (1984, TV Movie) - Josef Bühler
- Patrik Pacard (1984, TV Mini-Series) - Dr. Hübner
- Macho Man (1985) - Dr. Fischer (voice, uncredited)
- A Crime of Honour (a.k.a. A Song for Europe) (1985, TV Movie) - Weigel
- Anna Maria – Eine Frau geht ihren Weg (1994–1995, TV Series) - Robert Mangold
