= Hans Hellmut Kirst =

German novelist

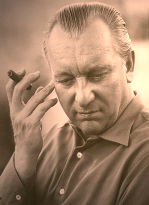
- Born: 5 December 1914; Ostróda, East Prussia (present-day Poland)
- Died: 23 February 1989 (aged 74); Bremen, West Germany
- Occupations: Novelist, war veteran
- Military career
- Allegiance: Nazi Germany
- Branch: Heer
- Service years: 1933–1945
- Rank: First Lieutenant
- Conflicts: World War II

Hans Hellmut Kirst (5 December 1914 – 23 February 1989) was a German novelist and the author of 46 books, many of which were translated into English. Kirst is best remembered as the creator of the "Gunner Asch" series which detailed the ongoing struggle of an honest individual to maintain his identity and humanity amidst the criminality and corruption of Nazi Germany.

== Biography ==
=== Early years ===
Hans Hellmut Kirst was born in Osterode, East Prussia. Osterode is today Ostróda in Poland.

Kirst joined the German Army in 1933 and served as an officer during World War II, ending the war as a First Lieutenant and Nationalsozialistischer Führungsoffizier. Kirst was a member of the Nazi Party, stating later that he had "confused National Socialism with Germany".

Kirst later indicated that after the war he did not immediately believe accounts of Nazi atrocities. "One did not really know one was in a club of murderers," he recalled.

=== Literary career ===
Kirst's first novel was published in 1950, translated into English as The Lieutenant Must Be Mad. The book told of a young German officer who sabotaged a Nazi garrison.

Kirst won an international reputation with the series Null-acht, fünfzehn (Zero-Eight, Fifteen), a satire on army life centered on Gunner Asch, a private who manages to buck the system. Initially conceived as a trilogy — 08/15 in der Kaserne (1954), 08/15 im Krieg (1954), 08/15 bis zum Ende (1955) — the three-book narrative was expanded to five with the publication of 08/15 Heute in 1963 and 08/15 in der Partei in 1978. The series follows the career of Asch, a common man in an impossible situation, from the years before World War II, to the Eastern Front, and finally into the world of post-war Germany.

The Gunner Asch series was published in English as: The Revolt of Gunner Asch (1955), Forward, Gunner Asch! (1956), The Return of Gunner Asch (1957), and What Became of Gunner Asch (1964).

Other major novels by Kirst set during the Third Reich and World War II include Officer Factory, about the investigation into the death of a training officer in an officer school near the end of World War II, Last Stop, Camp 7, the story of 48 hours in an internment camp for former Nazis, The Wolves, a tale of crafty resistance in a German village, and The Nights of the Long Knives, about a fictitious 6-man squad of SS hit men. All of these novels featured humor and satire, with leading characters often shown positioning themselves as outspoken, ardent Nazis during the Third Reich era before effortlessly flipping to become equally ardent in their claims to have been anti-Nazi and 100% pro-democracy or pro-communist after the tide turned.

Kirst also wrote about the July 1944 attempt to assassinate Adolf Hitler in Aufstand der Soldaten (1965), which was translated into English as Soldiers' Revolt.

Kirst's non-World-War-II-themed novels included The Seventh Day (1957), a nuclear holocaust story that received worldwide acclaim and was dubbed "so convincing, that it doesn't seem like fiction at all". Using a wide array of viewpoint characters, most of them Germans, it describes – step by step and day by day – how in just a single week a chain of small incidents escalates into bigger incidents, small-scale fighting, all-out war, resort to nuclear arms and finally a worldwide nuclear exchange with Europe totally destroyed by the Seventh Day and "the Days of Humanity were numbered". Symbolic characters are a pair of star-crossed lovers, a West German boy and his East German girlfriend, who spend the entire book desperately searching for each other finally to find and run towards each other but before they can touch a nuclear explosion vaporizes both of them in a split second.

Die letzte Karte spielt der Tod (1955) is a fictional account of the life of Soviet spy Richard Sorge, published in the United States as The Last Card and in the United Kingdom as Death Plays the Last Card.

In 1965 Kirst was nominated for an Edgar Award of the Mystery Writers of America for his 1962 book Die Nacht der Generale, translated into English as The Night of the Generals. The book dealt with an investigation into a series of murders of prostitutes during and after World War II committed by one of three German generals. The book was made into a 1967 film of the same name, which starred Omar Sharif and Peter O'Toole.

Kirst also wrote the Konstantin Keller series of detective novels set in Munich in the 1960s and published in English translations as Damned to Success (and also as A Time for Scandal), A Time for Truth and Everything has a Price.

In 1972 Kirst was a member of the jury at the 22nd Berlin International Film Festival. He was also a member of International PEN and The Authors Guild.

=== Legacy ===
At the time of his death, the New York Times noted that "his novels, many of them replaying the events of the war, reflect his acceptance of his nation's guilt," but that some critics "charged him with trivializing the history of the Third Reich.

== Death ==
Kirst died in Bremen in February 1989 aged 74 years and was survived by his wife, Ruth, and a daughter.

Kirst's books were translated into 28 languages and sold a total of 12 million copies during his lifetime.

== Works in English translation ==
- The Lieutenant Must Be Mad. New York: Harcourt, Brace, 1951/London: George G. Harrap and Co., 1951.
- The Revolt of Gunner Asch. Boston: Little, Brown, 1955. UK title: Zero Eight Fifteen: The Strange Mutiny of Gunner Asch: A Novel. London: Weidenfeld and Nicolson, 1955.
- Forward, Gunner Asch! Boston: Little, Brown, 1956. UK title: Gunner Asch Goes to War: Zero Eight Fifteen II: A Novel. London: Weidenfeld and Nicolson, 1956.
- The Return of Gunner Asch. Boston: Little, Brown, 1957/London: Weidenfeld and Nicolson, 1957. Subtitled Zero Eight Fifteen III in the UK edition.
- The Seventh Day. Garden City, NY: Doubleday, 1959. UK title: No One Will Escape: A Novel. London: Weidenfeld and Nicolson, 1959. (online copy at archive.org)
- Officer Factory: A Novel. London: Collins, 1962/Garden City, NY: Doubleday, 1963.
- The Night of the Generals: A Novel. New York: Harper and Row, 1963/London: Collins, 1963.
- What Became of Gunner Asch. New York: Harper and Row, 1964/London: Collins, 1964.
- Brothers in Arms: A Novel. New York: Harper and Row, 1965/London: Collins, 1965.
- Soldiers' Revolt. New York: Harper and Row, 1966. UK title: The 20th of July. London: Collins, 1966 .$*$
- The Last Card. New York: Pyramid Books, 1967. UK title: Death Plays the Last Card. London: Fontana/Collins, 1968.
- The Wolves. New York: Coward-McCann, 1968. UK title: The Fox of Maulen. London: Collins, 1968.
- Last Stop, Camp 7. New York: Coward-McCann, 1969. UK title: Camp 7 Last Stop. London: Collins, 1969.
- No Fatherland. New York: Coward-McCann, 1970. UK title: Undercover man. London: Collins, 1970.
- The Adventures of Private Faust. New York: Coward, McCann and Geoghegan, 1971.
- Who's In Charge Here? London: Collins, 1971.
- Hero in the Tower. New York: Coward, McCann and Geoghegan, 1972/London: Collins, 1972.
- A Time for Scandal. London: Collins, 1973. American title: Damned to Success: A Novel of Modern Munich. New York: Coward, McCann and Geoghegan, 1973.
- A Time for Truth. London: Collins, 1974/New York: Coward, McCann and Geoghegan, 1974.
- A Time for Payment. London: Collins, 1976.
- The Nights of the Long Knives. New York: Coward, McCann and Geoghegan, 1976/London: Collins, 1976.
- Everything Has Its Price. New York: Coward, McCann and Geoghegan, 1976. UK title A time for payment.
- The Affairs of the Generals. New York: Coward, McCann and Geoghegan, 1979. UK title: Twilight of the Generals. London: Collins, 1979.
- Party Games. New York: Simon and Schuster, 1979/London: Collins, 1980.
- Heroes for Sale. London: Collins, 1982.

$*$ Most of these novels are pure fiction. But not only is "The 20th of July" based on the assassination attempt against Hitler but Kirst followed the development of this event by using archive sources step by step. He filled in only small gaps of minor importance, where no sources were available.

=== List of novels in German ===
- Wir nannten ihn Galgenstrick, 1950
- Sagten Sie Gerechtigkeit, Captain? 1952 (Neufassung 1966, Letzte Station Camp 7)
- Aufruhr in einer kleinen Stadt, 1953
- 1. Band: 08/15 in der Kaserne, 1954
- 2. Band: 08/15 im Krieg, 1954
- 3. Band: 08/15 bis zum Ende, 1955
- Die letzte Karte spielt der Tod, 1955
- Gott schläft in Masuren, 1956
- Mit diesen meinen Händen, 1957 (literal translation: With these my hands)
- Keiner kommt davon, 1957 (literal translation: 'No one gets away (with it)’
- Kultura 5 und der rote Morgen, 1958 (literal translation: "Kultura 5" and the red morning)
- Glück läßt sich nicht kaufen, 1959 (literal translation: Fortune cannot be bought)
- Fabrik der Offiziere, 1960
- Kameraden, 1961 (literal translation: Comrades)
- Die Nacht der Generale, 1962 (literal translation: The night of the generals)
- Bilanz der Traumfabrik, 1963
- 08/15 heute, 1965 (literal translation: 08/15 Today)
- Aufstand der Soldaten, 1965
- Letzte Station Camp 7, 1966 (first edition 1952, Sagten Sie Gerechtigkeit, Captain?; literal translation Last Station Camp 7)
- Die Wölfe, 1967 (literal translation: the Wolves)
- Deutschland deine Ostpreußen, 1968 (literal translation: Germany your East Prussians)
- Kein Vaterland, 1968 (literal translation: No Fatherland)
- Soldaten, Offiziere, Generale, 1969 (literal translation: Soldiers, Officers, Generals)
- Faustrecht, 1969
- Heinz Rühmann, (biography), 1969
- Held im Turm, 1970
- Das Udo Jürgens Songbuch, 1970
- Kriminalistik, BLV-juniorwissen Band 5, 1971
- Verdammt zum Erfolg, 1971
- Gespräche mit meinem Hund Anton, 1972
- Verurteilt zur Wahrheit, 1972
- Verfolgt vom Schicksal, 1973
- Alles hat seinen Preis, 1974 (literal translation: Everything has its price)
- Und Petrulla lacht, 1974
- Die Nächte der langen Messer, 1975 (literal translation: The nights of the long knives)
- Generals-Affären, 1977
- Die Katzen von Caslano, 1977
- Endstation Stacheldraht, 1978
- 08/15 in der Partei, 1978 (literal translation: 08/15 in the party)
- Der Nachkriegssieger, 1979
- Der unheimliche Freund, 1979
- Hund mit Mann-Bericht über einen Freund, 1979
- Eine Falle aus Papier, 1981 (literal translation: A trap made of paper)
- Bedenkliche Begegnung, 1982
- Geld-Geld-Geld, 1982 (literal translation: Money-Money-Money)
- Ausverkauf der Helden, 1983
- Die gefährliche Wahrheit, 1984 (literal translation: The dangerous truth)
- Die seltsamen Menschen von Maulen, 1984
- Blitzmädel, 1984
- Ende 45, 1985
- Das Schaf im Wolfspelz. Ein deutsches Leben, 1985
- Ein manipulierter Mord, 1987 (literal translation: A manipulated murder)
- Geschieden durch den Tod, 1987
- Erzählungen aus Ostpreußen, 1987 (literal translation: Tales from East Prussia)
- Die merkwürdige Hochzeit in Bärenwalde, 1988 (literal translation: The strange feast in "Bärenwalde"/bear forest)
- Stunde der Totengräber, 1988 (literal translation: Hour of the grave-diggers)
- Der unheimliche Mann Gottes, 1988
- Menetekel ’39, 1989
- Vergebliche Warnung, Der Polenfeldzug, 1989
- Die Ermordung des Rittmeisters, 1992
- Erinnerungen an eine unvergessene Heimat

== Film adaptations ==
- 08/15 (1954)
- 08/15 – Part 2 (1955)
- 08/15 at Home (1955)
- Officer Factory (1960)
- The Night of the Generals (1967)
- Fabrik der Offiziere (1989, TV miniseries)
