= Huch =

Huch or HUCH may refer to:

- Emila Huch (born 1951), Samoan weightlifter
- Felix Huch (1880-1952), German physician
- Friedrich Huch (1873-1913), German writer
- Marie Huch (1853-1934), German writer
- Meritxell Huch (born 1978) Spanish stem cell biologist
- Ricarda Huch (1864–1947), German intellectual
- Rudolf Huch (1862-1943), German essayist, jurist and writer
- Michael Thomas Huch (born 1989), American Poet and writer

- 8847 Huch, asteroid named after Ricarda Huch
- Helsinki University Central Hospital (HUCH)
