= Marie Huch =

German writer (1853–1934)

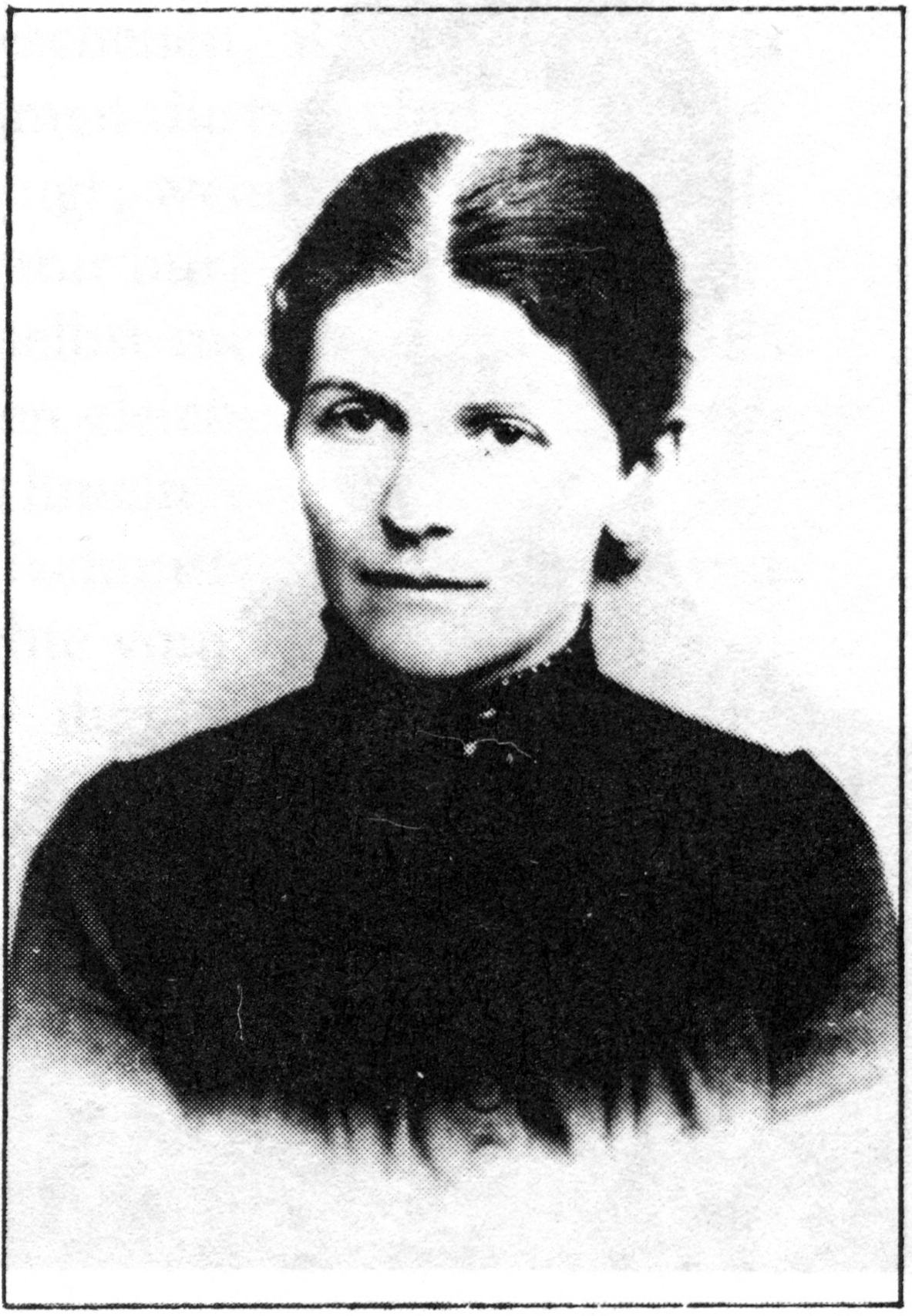
ca.1888

Marie Huch (born Marie Gerstäcker: 19 May 1853 - 16 August 1934) was a German writer.

== Biography ==
Sophie Carla Pauline Marie "Mady" Huch was born in the Plagwitz quarter of Leipzig. She was the eldest daughter of the travel-writer and novelist Friedrich Gerstäcker (1816 – 1872) and his wife, the court playhouse actress ("Hofschauspielerin") Anna Aurora Sauer (1822 – 1861). On 6 December 1870, now aged 17, she married the lawyer Wilhelm Huch (1817 – 1888) at the St Magnus Church in Braunschweig. They embarked on married life at their home in central Braunschweig at Hagenmarkt 13 (subsequently destroyed in the Second World War). Wilhelm Huch was slightly younger than Marie's father, but he was 36 years older than she was. The marriage was nevertheless followed by the births of six recorded children, including the writers Friedrich Huch (1873 – 1913) and Felix Huch (1880 – 1952). Marie Gerstäcker had married into a large literary family, and her husband was one of at least six siblings: Ricarda Huch (1864 – 1947) and Rudolf Huch (1862 – 1943) among Wilhelm Huch's nieces and nephews. During the 1870s and 1880s family finances became increasingly precarious. Wilhelm and Marie Huch moved house several times and by 1888 were living in rented accommodation.

After her husband's suicide on 9 June 1888 Marie Huch moved with her children to Dresden where the family received financial support from Richard Huch (1850 – 1914), her stepson from her late husband's earlier marriage.

After she was widowed Marie Huch moved house frequently. She lived out her final years with her son Felix Huch in Bautzen. It was here that she died, aged 81. Her body was taken to Braunschweig for burial, ending up beside the grave of her father who had died 62 years earlier. By 1934 Marie Huch had been predeceased by at least two of her children. In the end the bodies of three of her children were buried in the same burial plot as her own at the St Magnus Cemetery in Braunschweig. (Note: Three children of Wilhelm and Marie Huch were buried in the same burial plot Braunschweig as their mother's. These were: * Friedrich Huch (1873–1913) * Eva, verh. Müller-Hofmann (1882–1929, born Eva Huch) * Elisabeth Huch (1883–1956))

== Works ==
Marie Huch compiled a volume of memoires concerning her life as a young wife and mother with Wilhelm Huch in Braunschweig during the 1870s and 1880s. Apparently at the instigation of her kinswoman Ricarda Huch, Marie Huch's memoires were published posthumously together with those of her son Friedrich Huch (1873 – 1913), in 1978.
