= Hedwig Bleuler-Waser =

Swiss suffragette (1869–1940)

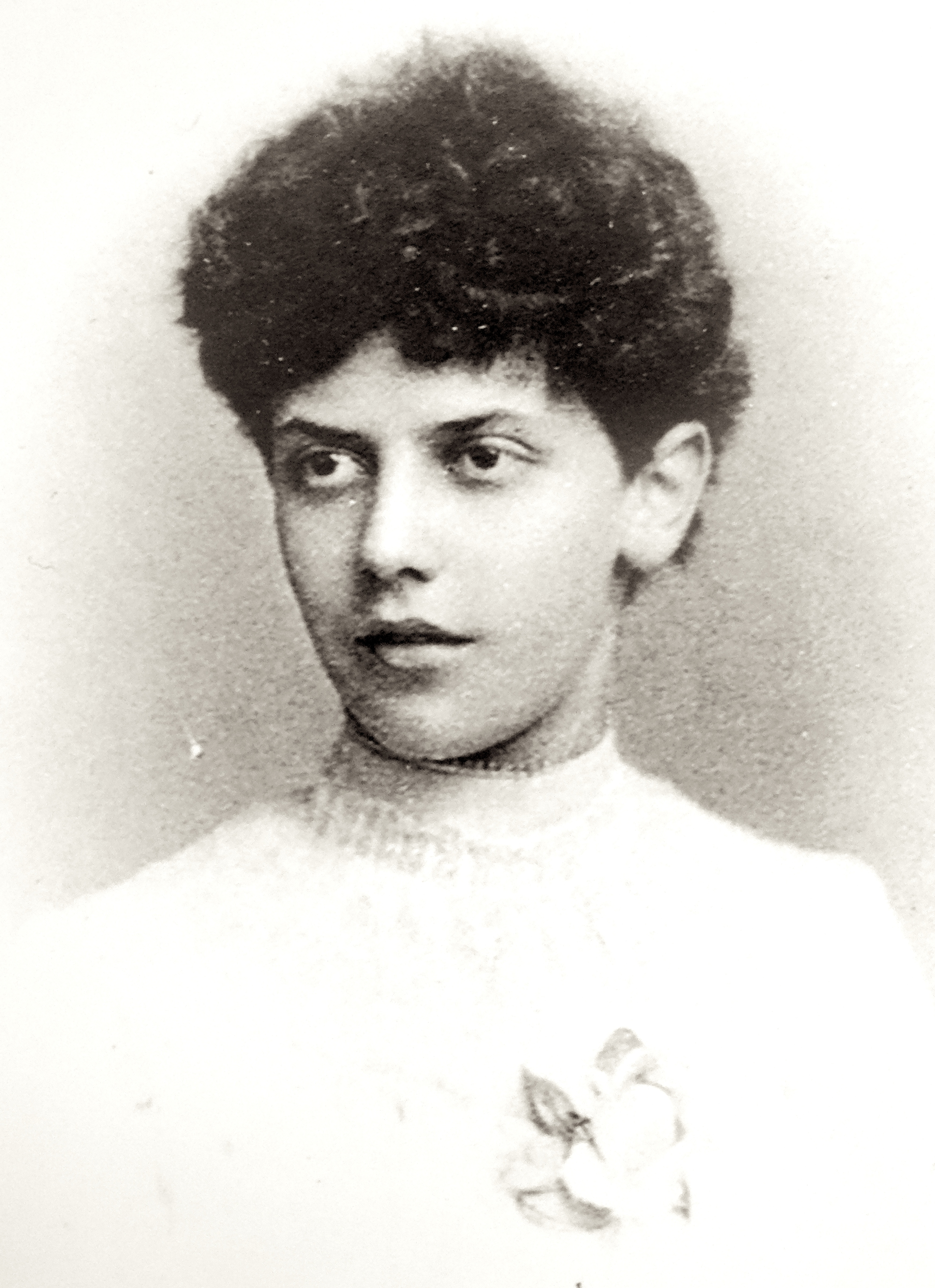
- Born: Sophie Hedwig Waser; 29 December 1869; Zürich, Switzerland
- Died: 1 February 1940 (aged 70); Zollikon, Switzerland
- Education: University of Zurich
- Spouse: Eugen Bleuler (m. 1901)
- Children: 2

Sophie Hedwig Bleuler-Waser (born Sophie Hedwig Waser; 29 December 1869 – 1 February 1940) was a Swiss suffragette who founded the Swiss Federation of Abstinent Women.

== Personal life ==
Bleuler-Waser was born on 29 December 1869 in Zürich. Bleuler-Waser married Swiss psychiatrist Eugen Bleuler. The two met while campaigning for the abstinence movement. The couple did not frequent Church and followed the ideas of the Enlightenment.

== Education and career ==
In 1901 she met Auguste Forel, a Swiss myrmecologist, neuroanatomist, psychiatrist and eugenicist, and at his suggestion, she founded the Swiss Federation of Abstinent Women. She chaired the Federation as president until October 1921. Together with her five children, she ran social events at the psychiatric hospital her husband, Dr. Eugen Bleuler, worked at, including serving afternoon tea.

In 1907, Bleuler-Waser graduated from the University of Zurich, becoming one of the few women to receive her doctorate. While at the University of Zurich she established lasting friendships with Marie Baum, Ricarda Huch and Marianne Plehn. After completing her doctorate, she taught at the Höhere Mädchenschule in Zürich.

During World War 1, Bleuler-Waser and Else Züblin were involved in the construction of alcohol-free soldiers' offices. In the winter of 1917, she started women's education courses in Zürich. For most of the time Bleuler was working in Burghölzli, between 1898 and 1927, the family lived together in an apartment outside the clinic. The apartment was also home to a secretary and junior doctor. From 1919 until 1937, she led the German-Swiss Ortsgruppenvereinigung (Local chapter of Association).

== Selected publications ==
The following is a list of selected publications:

- J.G. Lavater (1894)
- Ulrich Hegner: ein Schweizer Kultur- und Charakterbild (1901)
- Weihnachtsspiele (1910)
- Die Dichterschwestern Regula Keller und Betsy Meyer (1919)
- Lenzbub kommt (1920)
- Engelchens Erdenjahr : Weihnachtsspiel in fünf Bildern (1926)
