= Oskar Pfister =

Swiss minister

The Reverend Oskar Pfister
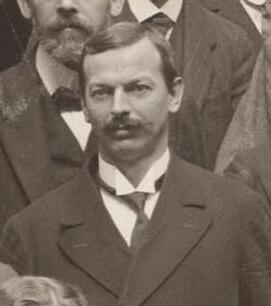
- Oskar Pfister in 1911
- Born: 23 February 1873; Wiedikon, Switzerland
- Died: 6 August 1956 (aged 83); Zurich, Switzerland
- Occupation(s): Lutheran minister and lay psychoanalyst

Oskar Pfister (Swiss Standard German: [ˈpfɪʃtər]; 23 February 1873 – 6 August 1956) was a Swiss Lutheran minister and lay psychoanalyst.

== Biography ==
Pfister studied theology, philosophy and psychology at the University of Zurich and the University of Basel, graduating in 1898 in the philosophical faculty. He then became a pastor, serving in Wald (canton of Zurich) until 1920. He is remembered for his efforts involving the application of psychoanalysis to the science of education, as well as his belief system in a synthesis of psychology and theology.

Pfister was a pioneer of modern Swiss psychology, belonging to a psychoanalytical circle in Zurich that was centered on Eugen Bleuler and Carl Jung. In 1919, he formed the Swiss Society for Psychoanalysis. Although the psychiatrist Emil Oberholzer founded a separate Swiss Medical Society for Psychoanalysis in 1928, Pfister stuck with the group he had started, defending Sigmund Freud's position on lay analysis that Oberholzer's group rejected.

Pfister was an early associate of Freud, maintaining an ongoing correspondence with him from 1909 to 1939 (the year of Freud's death). Pfister believed that theology and psychology were compatible disciplines and advocated the concept of a "Christian Eros". He was especially interested in Freud's concepts of the Oedipus complex, castration anxiety and infantile sexuality. From a religious standpoint, Pfister advocated a return to what he saw as the original fundamental teachings of Jesus Christ.

The Oskar Pfister Award is awarded by the American Psychiatric Association, with the Association of Professional Chaplains, for significant contributions to the field of religion and psychiatry. He was the uncle of Rudolf Pfister.

== Selected writings ==
- 1910: Die Frömmigkeit des Grafen Ludwig von Zinzendorf
- 1917: The Psychoanalytic Method; Charles Rockwell Payne (translator)
- 1944: Das Christentum und die Angst: Eine religionspsychologische, historische und religionshygienische Untersuchung
- 1948: Christianity and Fear (translation of Das Christentum und die Angst)
- 2018: Psychoanalysis & Faith: the Letters of Sigmund Freud & Oskar Pfister (1909–39)
