= Mira Oberholzer-Gincburg =

Swiss psychiatrist and psychoanalyst (1887–1949)

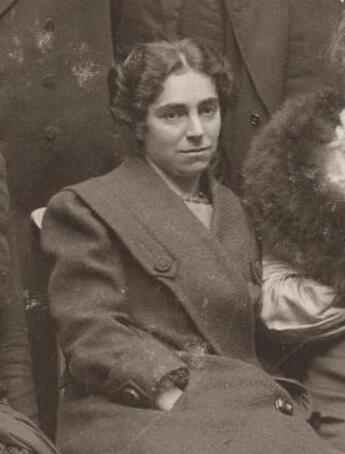
- Born: Mira Gincburg; 13 January 1884; Dinaburg, Vitebsk Governorate, Russian Empire
- Died: 12 December 1949 (aged 65); New York City, U.S.
- Education: University of Zurich
- Known for: Child psychology
- Scientific career
- Fields: Psychology
- Institutions: Zürich psychiatric university hospital Breitenau psychiatric centre, Schaffhausen
- Academic advisors: Carl Gustav Jung

Mira Oberholzer-Gincburg (née Mira Gincburg, Swiss Standard German: [ˈɡɪntsbʊrɡ], 13 January 1884 – 12 December 1949) was a Swiss medical doctor and psychoanalyst of Russian-Polish origin. A pioneer of psychoanalysis in general and child psychology in particular, she was a founding member of the Swiss Society of Psychoanalysis in 1919 and worked in Switzerland and the United States as a child analyst.

== Early life ==
Mira Gincburg was born on 13 January 1884 to Rafael Saveliev and Ravka Salmanowa Gordin, a Jewish couple, in Dinaburg (then part of the Russian Empire, now in Latvia). Her father died when Gincburg was thirteen. She completed her schooling in Łódź and moved to Bern in 1901, and then to Zürich in 1903, to pursue her medical studies.

Gincburg spent time in Russia in 1904-05 for a teacher's examination. While there, she also participated in the failed 1905 Russian Revolution. She returned to Zürich, and resumed studying medicine at the University of Zurich in 1906. In September 1908, she submitted her thesis on the impact inorganic salts can have on the galvanic excitability of the nervous system. She earned her doctorate in 1909. Later that year, she travelled to Saint Petersburg to appear for, and pass, the Russian state examination.

== Career ==
Gincburg, as a student of Carl Jung, engaged in analysis of children for some time at the Zürich psychiatric university hospital in 1909. She then moved to Riga to work at a sanatorium for the mentally ill before switching to Berlin in 1910 for further training. She was admitted into the Berlin Psychoanalytic Association in April 1911 as its first female member, and participated in the International Psychoanalytic Congress in Weimar.

Joining the Zürich wing of the International Psychoanalytic Association and the Association of Swiss Alien Doctors in 1911, Gincburg presented her analysis of a suicide attempt, contending that suicidal tendencies of a person with schizophrenia might not result directly from the condition itself but from the same factors involved in neurosis.

Gincburg married the psychiatrist Emil Oberholzer in 1913. They worked together at the Breitenau psychiatric centre in Schaffhausen as assistants to Hans Bertschinger. In 1915, they moved to Kusnacht to work with Theodore Brunner.

Oberholzer-Gincburg began a psychoanalytic clinic in Zürich with Emil Oberholzer after World War I ended. Following the ideological conflict between Jung and Sigmund Freud, the couple were among the founding members of the Swiss Society for Psychoanalysis (SSPsa) in 1919. She personally undertook analysis of her husband, and later referred him to Freud for further analysis. In 1923, she left their practice for some time to visit Freud for analysis in Vienna. She bore a son, Emil Hermann, in 1926. The couple left the SSPsa to create a new organization, the Swiss Medical Association for Psychoanalysis, in 1928.

Rising anti-semitism in Switzerland prompted the Oberholzers to move to the United States in 1938, opening a psychoanalytic practice in New York City. They were among those who founded the Association for Psychoanalytic and Psychosomatic Medicine in 1942.

Mira Oberholzer-Gincburg died in New York City on 12 December 1949.

== Published articles ==
- Tolstoi über den Traum. Zentralblatt für Psychoanalyse 2, p. 615 (1911–12)
- Mitteilung eines Kindheitstraumes. Internationale Zeitschrift für Psychoanalyse, 1-1, pp. 79-80 (1913)
- Aus der Analyse eines 13-jährigen Mädchens. Schweizer Archiv für Neurologie und Psychiatrie 26, pp. 287-292 (1930)
