= The Deruga Case =

Der Fall Deruga (The Deruga Case) is a novel by Ricarda Huch first published in German in 1917 about a physician charged with killing his ex-wife. An early courtroom drama, it depicts a trial by jury in which the defendant is reluctant, if not unwilling, to talk about the crime he has allegedly committed. In 1938 the novel was turned into a film of the same title.

== Plot introduction ==
After the death, assumedly from cancer, of his former wife Mingo Swieter, Dr Sigismondo Deruga, a 46-year-old nose and throat specialist, is accused by the deceased woman's cousin, a Baroness, of having poisoned her. A post-mortem is performed, and indeed traces of curare are found in the woman's body. Deruga leaves his medical practice in Prague and travels to Munich, where his wife lived after their divorce, only to learn that rumour has it that he murdered Mingo Swieter out of greed, as he now stands to inherit a considerable fortune. Deruga on the other hand claims that he did not know he was the beneficiary of her will, and that he did not communicate with her in any way for the last seventeen years of her life. Also, he maintains that at the time of the murder he was unavailable for his patients not because he was travelling to Munich to kill his ex-wife but because he was spending three days in the flat of a woman whose name he refuses to disclose as he does not want to taint her reputation.

== Plot summary ==
The novel opens with the beginning of the trial, which takes place in pre-1914 Munich. Right from the start Deruga, who has not been taken into custody so far, attracts the attention of everyone present through his conspicuous behaviour, which ranges from seemingly unmotivated emotional outbursts to complete indifference as to what is going on in the courtroom—at one point he even seems to have fallen asleep. Part of his idiosyncratic demeanour is attributed to his Italian ancestry—Deruga was born and raised in poor circumstances in an Italian mountain village and only came to Germany and Austria to read medicine— but the rest is ascribed to his choleric temperament. As the trial proceeds, Deruga turns out to have been living a life somewhat outside the bourgeois society which would normally harbour people of his professional standing: he neglects his run-down practice, has debts not only with one of his colleagues but also with his restaurateur, tailor, and hairdresser, shuns the local medical society, and has frequent and irregular love affairs.

While Deruga himself does not seem to care one way or another, there are clearly two opposing parties: one group, headed by the Baronin Truschkowitz, who feel strongly that a murderer must be brought to justice; and another, motley group of people who have crossed the defendant's path at some point in their lives and who, summoned to testify as character witnesses, insist that, despite his occasional rudeness, he has always been a witty, kind, sympathetic, helpful, even philanthropic, man whose lack of interest to accumulate money would never have induced him to kill his ex-wife on the sheer hope that he might be included in her will. They also point out his unblemished professional record, and therefore say that he must be acquitted.

The discovery of a handwritten letter from Mingo Swieter to Deruga finally triggers a turn of events in Deruga's favour. It is found in the inside pocket of a man's suit which was carelessly thrown into a canal in Munich and retrieved by a poor woman who was going to sell it to a clothes peddler. In the letter, which is the first communication between the ex-spouses since their divorce, the dying woman appeals to Deruga to shorten her suffering by performing euthanasia on her. On the last day of the trial, Deruga at last explains how he received the letter, immediately took the train to Munich, disguised himself as a peddler, stole into Mingo Swieter's flat while her daily help was away on errands, talked to the dying woman, administered the poison, waited until she was dead, and travelled back to Prague, happy to have been able to assist his ex-wife in her hour of need. In the end Deruga is acquitted.

The final chapters of the novel also throw some light on the individual characters' motives to act the way they do. Deruga's arch enemy, the Baronin Truschkowitz, who appears throughout the trial as an embittered and vengeful woman only out to get her cousin's inheritance, turns out to be trapped in a boring marriage; intended to use the money to buy her freedom from her dull husband now that their daughter Mingo has come of age. Neither her unfading beauty, which has not gone unnoticed by Deruga, nor her joie de vivre have ever tempted her to be unfaithful to her husband, but after her cousin's death she thought the time had come to divorce him. When she meets Deruga after the end of the trial, he confesses that their attraction is mutual and that he had been tempted to pursue her, but the discovery of his ex-wife's letter had reminded him of the sublime feelings he had in helping his dying wife made living on seem pointless; he has resolved to commit suicide. Further complications arise when Mingo von Truschkowitz declares her love for Deruga, although he is 25 years her senior. The Baroness actually offers him her daughter's hand, but Deruga is too sensible to accept and sticks with his decision to commit suicide.

Willy Birgel as Dr Deruga in the 1938 film

== Editions ==
- In 1917, the first edition of the German original was published in Berlin by Ullstein and in Freiburg im Breisgau and Zürich by Atlantis Verlag. The novel has been frequently reprinted.
- In 1929, Macaulay published an English translation by Lorna Dietz under the title, "The Deruga Trial."
- In 2007, the Süddeutsche Zeitung chose Der Fall Deruga as one of 100 "great novels of the 20th century" (a selection which includes translations from other languages) and published a special edition.
- A William Needham translation under the title "The Deruga Case" is available at
- A translation by John McElhose under the title "The Deruga Case" was published in 2008.
- Der Fall Deruga at Project Gutenberg (in German).

== Film adaptation ==
In 1938, a UFA movie directed by Fritz Peter Buch was released. The Deruga Case starred Willy Birgel as Deruga, Georg Alexander and Dagny Servaes as Baron and Baronin Truschkowitz, Geraldine Katt as Baroness Mingo Truschkowitz, and Käthe Haack as Mingo Swieter's confidante, Fräulein Schwertfeger.

== Read on ==
- Leonhard Frank: Die Ursache (1915)
- Raymond Postgate: Verdict of Twelve (1940)
