= Huguenin =

Huguenin is a surname. Notable people with the surname include:

- Anne-Marie Huguenin (1875–1943), Canadian journalist
- Gustav Huguenin (1840–1920), Swiss internist and pathologist
- Marianne Huguenin (born 1950), Swiss politician
- Marcel Huguenin (1930–2020), Swiss cross-country skier
- René Huguenin (born 1944), Swiss ice hockey player
- Victor Huguenin (1802–1860), French sculptor
