= The Deruga Case (film) =

1938 film

- Directed by: Fritz Peter Buch
- Written by: L.A.C. Müller; Hans Neumann; Fritz Peter Buch
- Based on: The Deruga Case by Ricarda Huch
- Produced by: Georg Witt
- Starring: Willy Birgel; Geraldine Katt; Dagny Servaes; Georg Alexander
- Cinematography: Werner Bohne
- Edited by: Elisabeth Kleinert-Neumann
- Music by: Hans Ebert
- Production company: UFA
- Distributed by: UFA
- Release date: 22 September 1938
- Running time: 105 minutes
- Country: Nazi Germany
- Language: German

The Deruga Case (German: Der Fall Deruga) is a 1938 German crime drama film directed by Fritz Peter Buch and starring Willy Birgel, Geraldine Katt and Dagny Servaes. It is based on the 1917 novel of the same title by Ricarda Huch. It was shot at the Babelsberg Studios in Potsdam. The film's sets were designed by the art directors Wilhelm Depenau and Ludwig Reiber.

== Synopsis ==
Doctor Deruga is put on trial for murdering his wealthy ex-wife, Mingo Swieter, after curare is discovered in her body during a post-mortem. The prosecution, driven by his ex-wife's embittered cousin, Baroness Truschkowitz, argues that the impoverished doctor killed her to inherit a fortune. Deruga refuses to provide an alibi to protect the reputation of another woman, but his innocence is eventually proven when it is revealed his ex-wife actually committed suicide to end her suffering from a terminal illness. The doctor is acquitted, but remains haunted by the experience.

== Cast ==
- Willy Birgel as Dr. Stefan Deruga
- Geraldine Katt as Baroness Mingo Truschkowitz
- Dagny Servaes as Baronin Truschkowitz
- Georg Alexander as Baron Truschkowitz
- Käthe Haack as Marta Schwertfeger
- Claire Winter as Ursula Züger
- Hans Leibelt as Justizrat Dr. Klemm
- Erich Fiedler as Dr. Schelling
- Paul Bildt as Landgerichtsvorsitzender Dr. Zeunemann
- Walter Franck as Senior Prosecutor
- Ernst Karchow as Prosecutor Dr. Noth
- Erika von Thellmann as Therese Klinkhardt
- Roma Bahn as Valeska Durich
- Fritz Odemar as Hofrat Dr. Mäulchen
- Leo Peukert as Verzelli
- Erich Ziegel as Professor Vandermühl
- Oscar Sabo as Hausmeister Schulz
- Beppo Brem as Friseur Alfinger
- Walter Albrecht as 1. Geschworener
- Otto Braml as 1. Gerichtswachtmeister
- Walter Buhse as 2 Geschworener
- Loulou Daenner as 2. Journalistin
- Jac Diehl as Justizwachtmeister
- Josefine Dora as Garderobiere
- Peter Erkelenz as Sachverständiger
- Wilhelm Große as 6. Geschworener
- Christine Großmann as 1. Journalistin
- Kurt Hagen as 2. Gerichtswachtmeister
- Bruno Klockmann as 3. Geschworener
- William Leo as Protokollführer
- Karin Luesebrink as Zuschauerin bei der Gerichtsverhandlung
- Guenther Markert as 2. Journalist
- Otto Marle as 4. Geschworener
- Edith Meinhard as Serviererin
- Hugo Meissl as Prozesszeichner
- Hans Nerking as 1. Beisitzer
- Alfred Pussert as 3. Journalist
- Louis Ralph as Kriminalbeamter
- Leo Reiter as 5. Geschworener
- Arthur Reppert as Zuschauer bei der Gerichtsverhandlung
- Jutta Sabo as Zuschauerin bei der Gerichtsverhandlung
- Ernst Albert Schaach Diener Fredrich
- Willi Schaeffers as Privatdetektiv
- Walter Schenk as 4. Journalist
- S.O. Schoening as 2. Beisitzer
- Wera Schultz as Zuschauerin bei der Gerichtsverhandlung
- Alfred Stratmann as Zuschauer bei der Gerichtsverhandlung =
- Tommy Thomas as Zuschauer bei der Gerichtsverhandlung
- Bruno Tillessen as Gast im Café
- Egon Vogel as 5. Journalist
- Jens von Hagen as 1. Journalist
- Hubert von Meyerinck as Riedmüller
- Walter Werner as Sanitätsrat Dr. Gürtner

== Bibliography ==
- Klaus, Ulrich J. Deutsche Tonfilme: Jahrgang 1938. Klaus-Archiv, 1988.
- Moeller, Felix. The Film Minister: Goebbels and the Cinema in the Third Reich. Axel Menges, 2000.
