= Rudolf Pfister =

Rudolf Pfister (23 July 1909 - 11 May 2000) was a Swiss Protestant pastor and academic.

== Life ==
He was a son of the engineer Heinrich Friedrich Jakob Pfister and his wife Margareta Emilie (nee. Rinderknecht) and grew up in Horgen on Lake Zurich. His grandfather was dean of Wädenswil, Johann Jakob Pfister (1849–1935). His uncle, the pastor and psychologist Oskar Pfister, conducted a lively correspondence with Sigmund Freud.

He matriculated at the University of Zurich and began studying theology, studying church history and the history of dogma under Fritz Blanke among others. He then continued his studies at the University of Heidelberg. In 1933 he passed his concordat examination and was ordained into the Evangelical Reformed Church of the Canton of Zürich. In 1934 he became a pastor in Hausen am Albis, gained his doctorate in Zürich supervised by Emil Brunner with a dissertation on The Problem of Original Sin in Zwingli, and married Béatrice, daughter of hotelier Friedrich Fahrni

From 1940 onwards he was pastor in Winterthur-Wülflingen and from 1950 to retirement 1976 in the Altstetten quarter of Zürich. After habilitating with a treatise entitled The Blessedness of the Chosen Gentiles in Zwingli, he began lecturing as a privatdozent in the theology faculty at the University of Zürich in 1950, where he was also senior lecturer in church history and the history of dogma from 1958 to 1976. He also served as a military chaplain and (during his retirement) as a pastor.

== Religious, literary and research work ==
As a church historian Pfister intensively studied Zwingli and gained distinction for his own three-volume Kirchengeschichte der Schweiz (Church History of Switzerland), the first-ever work of its kind, since Theodor Schwegler's Geschichte der katholischen Kirche in der Schweiz (History of the Catholic Church in Switzerland) did not include Swiss Protestantism. He also supported ecumenism and was president of the Swiss Protestant People's Association, which until 1975 also included the Swiss Evangelical Press Service. As early as the 1940s he was active in the 'Zwignli Main Writings', for which he edited nine of Zwingli's writings in two volumes.

He also published articles in the journal Zwingliana between 1947 and 1985 as well as publishing in Der Grundriß, Schweizerische Reformierte Monatsschrift, Theologischen Zeitschrift, Evangelischen Missions-Magazin, Kirchenblatt für die reformierte Schweiz, Neuen Schweizer Rundschau, Lexikon der Frau, Neuen Deutsche Biographie, Archiv für Reformationsgeschichte, Religion in Geschichte und Gegenwart, Evangelischen Kirchenlexikon, Kirchenboten für den Kanton Zürich, Weltkirchenlexikon, the zeitschrift Protestant, Halbmonatsschrift für konfessionskundliche Gegenwartsfragen, Tages-Anzeiger, Sie und Er, Handbuch der reformierten Schweiz, Schweizerische politische Korrespondenz and Schweizerischen Evangelischen Pressedienst. He also contributed book reviews to several magazines.

He established himself as a Zwingli scholar via his doctorate and habilitation and his works are still used for reference. After Oskar Farner's death in 1959 he reviewed and completed the fourth volume of Farner's major biography of Zwingli. From 1958 onwards he was also co-editor of the historical-critical edition of Zwingli's works. He also studied the reformer Heinrich Bullinger and wrote several articles and essays on him, including one on Bullinger's assessment of the Council of Trent.

== Selected works ==
- Problem der Erbsünde bei Zwingli. Leipzig 1939.
- Zwingli, der Staatsmann. Zürich: Zwingli Verlag, 1942.
- Hauptschriften. Zürich 1941–1963.
- Die Freundschaft zwischen Guillaume Farel und Huldrych Zwingli. Zürich 1947.
- Die Seligkeit erwählter Heiden bei Zwingli. Erschienen in Evangelisches Missions-Magazin 95, 1951, S. 70–80.
- Die Reformationsgemeinde Locarno 1540–1555. 1955.
- Um des Glaubens willen – Die evangelischen Flüchtlinge von Locarno und ihre Aufnahme zu Zürich im Jahre 1555. Zollikon-Zürich, Evangelischer Verlag, 1955.
- Oskar Farner; Rudolf Pfister: Reformatorische Erneuerung von Kirche und Volk in Zürich und in der Eidgenossenschaft 1525–1531. Zürich Zwingli-Verlag 1960.
- Pierre Viret: 1511-1571. 1961.
- Das Zweite Vatikanische Konzil von 1962 und wir Protestanten. Zürich: Zwingli Verlag, 1962.
- Fritz Blanke; Oskar Farner; Rudolf Pfister: Kommentar Huldrych Zwinglis über die wahre und falsche Religion. Zürich Zwingli-Verlag 1963.
- Konfessionelles in der Schweiz des 17. Jahrhunderts: Claudius Schobinger. 1969.
- Kirchengeschichte der Schweiz.
  - Volume 1: Von den Anfängen bis zum Ausgang des Mittelalters. Zürich: Zwingli Verlag 1964.
  - Volume 2: Von der Reformation bis zum 2. Villmerger Krieg. Zürich: Theologischer Verlag, 1974.
  - Volume 3: Von 1720 bis 1950. Zürich: Theologischer Verlag, 1985.
- Territoriale Vielgestalt und evangelisch-reformierte Kirche in der Schweiz. Zürich 1971.
- Zu Bullingers Beurteilung des Konzils von Trient. 1975.

== Bibliography (in German) ==
- Rudolf Pfister. In: Zwingliana XV/1 1979. S. 3–7.
- Rudolf Pfister. In: Universität Zürich: Nachrufe. 2000. S. 15 f.
- Entry in the Historisches Lexikon der Schweiz
