= 879 Ricarda =

Asteroid

Discovery
- Discovered by: Max Wolf
- Discovery site: Heidelberg Observatory
- Discovery date: 22 July 1917

Designations
- Named after: Ricarda Huch
- Alternative designations: 1917 CJ

Orbital characteristics
- Epoch 31 July 2016 (JD 2457600.5)
- Uncertainty parameter 0
- Observation arc: 98.74 yr (36066 days)
- Aphelion: 2.9230 AU (437.27 Gm)
- Perihelion: 2.1433 AU (320.63 Gm)
- Semi-major axis: 2.5332 AU (378.96 Gm)
- Eccentricity: 0.15390
- Orbital period (sidereal): 4.03 yr (1472.6 d)
- Mean anomaly: 167.363°
- Mean motion: 0° 14^{m} 40.056^{s} / day
- Inclination: 13.669°
- Longitude of ascending node: 269.958°
- Argument of perihelion: 96.549°

Physical characteristics
- Synodic rotation period: 82.9 h (3.45 d)
- Absolute magnitude (H): 11.0

879 Ricarda is a minor planet orbiting the Sun that was discovered by German astronomer Max Wolf on 22 July 1917.

This is a member of the dynamic Maria family of asteroids that most likely formed as the result of a collisional breakup of a parent body.

It is named after German intellectual Ricarda Huch. Main-belt asteroid 8847 Huch is also named after her.
