= The Girl Irene =

1936 film

- Directed by: Reinhold Schünzel
- Written by: Eva Leidmann; Reinhold Schünzel
- Based on: play Sixteen by: Aimée Stuart; Philip Stuart
- Produced by: Erich von Neusser
- Starring: Lil Dagover; Sabine Peters; Geraldine Katt; Hedwig Bleibtreu
- Cinematography: Robert Baberske
- Edited by: Arnfried Heyne
- Music by: Alois Melichar
- Production company: UFA
- Distributed by: UFA
- Release date: 9 October 1936
- Running time: 95 minutes
- Country: Germany
- Language: German

The Girl Irene (German: Das Mädchen Irene) is a 1936 German drama film directed by Reinhold Schünzel and starring Lil Dagover, Sabine Peters and Geraldine Katt. It is based on the British play Sixteen by Aimée Stuart about the widowed mother of a middle class family who falls in love, provoking the jealousy of her daughter. It was shot at the Babelsberg and Tempelhof Studios of UFA in Berlin with location shooting taking place in London, Monte Carlo and Paris as well as around the German capital. The film's sets were designed by the art directors Ludwig Reiber and Walter Reimann.

== Synopsis ==
In London, Jennifer Lawrence wishes to marry Sir John Corbett and first discusses it with her daughters Baba and Irene. Irene, who idealized her own father, is strongly opposed, but her mother decides to marry anyway. Irene runs away and tries to drown herself, but is saved by Philip and Baba, who, sobbing in tears hugging Irene laying in the boat, repeats, in her way and attitude to express love and affection, she to be "…anyway a stupid goat!" who would be death if they didn't find her in time. Irene, in her arms, whispers cheek to cheek that mom should never know what she was going to do. Baba promises it and turns her head, still sobbing but not losing her humour, to tell Philip he has to give up his medal of valor for saving a life, which Philip, in love with Irene, agrees while drying his drenched trousers and, cool, replies: "Obviously: I mine, you your one!". "Are you happy to not be died?" Asks Baba to Irene, who replies: "I'm ashamed!". Baba, back: "You have not to do it at all, not so, Philip? She has not to do it!". "I had to be sick" says Irene, "Nonsense: you were jealous!" replies Baba, "He's such a proper person; think about what he's taking: me so naughty, you so hysterical! And even if she marries him, she stays anyway OUR MOMMY!" (kiss on mouth and:) "You're right, Baba… I'm truly a goat!" "You're right… but a SWEET goat!" and, cheek to cheek, movie ends.

== Cast ==
- Lil Dagover as Jennifer Lawrence
- Sabine Peters as Irene Lawrence, ihre Tochter
- Geraldine Katt as Baba Lawrence, ihre Tochter
- Hedwig Bleibtreu as Großmutter
- Elsa Wagner as Frau König
- Karl Schönböck as Sir John Corbett
- Hans Richter as Philip
- Roma Bahn as Die Baronin
- Alice Treff as Lady Taylor
- Erich Fiedler as Bobby Cut
- Olga Limburg as Die Herzogin
- Gertrud Wolle as Die Lehrerin
- Georges Boulanger as Der Geiger
- Hilde Scheppan as Die Sängerin

== Bibliography ==
- Kreimeier, Klaus (1999). The Ufa Story: A History of Germany's Greatest Film Company, 1918–1945. University of California Press. ISBN 978-0-520-22069-0.
