= Night on Mont Blanc =

1951 film

- Directed by: Harald Reinl
- Written by: Harald Reinl
- Produced by: Franz Hoffmann
- Starring: Dagmar Rom; Dietmar Schönherr; Geraldine Katt
- Cinematography: Walter Riml
- Edited by: Harald Reinl
- Music by: Giuseppe Becce
- Production company: Hope Film
- Distributed by: Gloria Film
- Release date: 16 November 1951
- Running time: 80 minutes
- Countries: Austria; West Germany
- Language: German

Night on Mont Blanc (German: Nacht am Montblanc) is a 1951 Austrian-German crime adventure film directed by Harald Reinl and starring Dagmar Rom, Dietmar Schönherr and Geraldine Katt. It was shot at the Thiersee Studios in Vienna and extensively on location around the Zillertal Alps. A mountain film, it is effectively a remake of the 1926 silent film The Holy Mountain directed by Arnold Fanck.

== Cast ==
- Dagmar Rom as Monika
- Dietmar Schönherr as Vigo, Leutnant der Grenzpolizei
- Geraldine Katt as Frau Schnackendorf
- Oskar Sima as Portier
- Gerd Deutschmann as Angelo
- Baldur von Hohenbalken as Hans
- Willy Danek as Polizeikommissar
- Otto Bolesch as Grandjean

== Bibliography ==
- Barham, Jeremy (ed.) The Routledge Companion to Global Film Music in the Early Sound Era. Taylor & Francis, 2024.
- Fritsche, Maria. Homemade Men In Postwar Austrian Cinema: Nationhood, Genre and Masculinity . Berghahn Books, 2013.
- Von Dassanowsky, Robert. Austrian Cinema: A History. McFarland, 2005.
