= Manfred Bleuler =

Manfred Bleuler (4 January 1903 – 4 November 1994) was a Swiss physician and psychiatrist. Following in the footsteps of his father, doctoral supervisor, and colleague, Eugen Bleuler, Manfred Bleuler was devoted primarily to the study and treatment of schizophrenia. For his contributions, he received the Stanley R. Dean Award in 1970 and the Marcel Benoist Prize in 1972.

== Biography ==
Bleuler studied medicine at the University of Zurich as well as in Kiel and Geneva. He trained at the Kantonales Krankenhaus Liestal and, mostly, in the US, at Boston Psychopathic Hospital, Boston City Hospital, and Bloomingdale Hospital in New York. In 1933, he was appointed the chief physician in the psychiatric departments at St. Pirminsberg, Pfäfers, and the University Clinic, Basel. In 1942, Bleuler became the Professor of Psychiatry at University of Zurich and the Director of the University Psychiatric Clinic at Burghölzli, where he stayed until his retirement in 1969.

Manfred Bleuler has been praised as the foremost Bleuler scholar, providing valuable insight into his father's seminal Dementia Praecox or the Group of Schizophrenias. However, Bleuler himself greatly contributed to the study of the disorder, especially then the topics of late onset schizophrenia, chronic versus acute schizophrenia, and prognosis assessment. Perhaps the most critically, Bleuler first evaluated the impact of environmental variables on the development and outcome of schizophrenia in detail.

== Selected works ==
- Bleuler, M. (1972) Die schizophrenen Geistesstörungen: im Lichte langjähriger Kranken und Familiengeschichten. New York: Intercontinental Medical Book Corporation (U.S. distributor).
- Bleuler, M., & Bleuler, R. (1986). Dementia Praecox oder Gruppe der Schizophrenien: Eugen Bleuler. British Journal of Psychiatry, 149, 661–664.
