= Emil Oberholzer =

Swiss-American psychiatrist

Emil Oberholzer (German: [ˈoːbɐˌhɔltsɐ]; December 24, 1883 – May 4, 1958) was a German-born Swiss-American psychiatrist. He was born in Zweibrücken, Kingdom of Bavaria, Germany, and died in New York City.

== Biography ==
Beginning in 1908, Oberholzer received psychiatric training under Eugen Bleuler in Zurich, and afterwards was an assistant at the psychiatric clinic in Schaffhausen from 1911 to 1916. In 1919, he opened a private practice in Zurich, and in 1938, emigrated to New York City, where he practiced psychoanalysis.

Oberholzer was an early practitioner of Freudian psychoanalysis and dream analysis. Beginning in June 1913 he received personal analysis from Freud, and continued to be psychoanalyzed extensively in the Freudian manner over a period of several years. With his wife, Mira Gincburg and Swiss pastor Oskar Pfister, he founded the Swiss Society for Psychoanalysis in 1919.

Oberholzer assisted Hermann Rorschach (1884–1922) in the development of shape interpretation tests, and later trained American psychiatrists who subsequently introduced the Rorschach test in the United States.
