= Felix Huch =

German writer (1880–1952)

- Born: 6 September 1880; Braunschweig, Germany
- Died: 6 July 1952 (aged 71); Tutzing, Bavaria, Federal Republic of Germany (West Germany)
- Education: Heidelberg
- Occupations: Physician; Writer
- Spouse: Marie-Euphrasie Barbier (1885-1924)
- Children: 3
- Parents: William Huch (1817-1888) (father); Marie Gerstäcker (1853-1934) (mother)

Felix Huch (6 September 1880 - 6 July 1952) was a German Physician who worked in the public health service. By the time he retired he had reached the level of an "Obermedizinalrat" (Loosely, "Chief Medical Consultant"). He was also a passionate amateur musician and musicologist: in middle age he embarked on a parallel second career as a writer of biographical novels about musicians. Huch was completely aware of the challenges involved for writers and readers (including critics) of biographical novels dealing with iconic figures from the past. But as he himself wrote in respect of his 1927 book on "The young Beethoven", "what is ... reported to us is relatively sparse. That is why the imagination has to do most of the work if the name is to become a living image of Beethoven's young manhood, along with a full and living picture of his human and artistic development are to emerge". Whatever reservations purists might harbour, Huch's "bio-novels" on Mozart and Beethoven were popular, reprinted a number of times during the author's lifetime and after his death. They remain available more than fifty years after his death. Languages into which his books have been translated include Dutch, Japanese, Russian and Turkish.

== Life ==
Felix Huch was born into a family of writers in Braunschweig, the second of his parents' six children. His mother was the novelist Marie Huch. His maternal grandfather was the travel writer and novelist Friedrich Gerstäcker. His elder brother, the philologist Friedrich, wrote books. There were more writers among his cousins and uncles. However, William Huch, his father, was a notary-lawyer. Another unusual feature of his childhood was that his mother, who had been just 17 when she married, was thirty-six years younger than her husband, who had been a widower at the time of the marriage. Felix Huch was not quite 8 when, after years of intensifying financial difficulties, his father committed suicide his mother took her six fatherless children with her to Dresden, which was where Felix Huch grew up and where the family received discrete financial support from Richard Huch (1850 – 1914), one of Felix's five half-siblings and his mother's stepchildren from William Huch's first marriage.

He studied medicine at university, his student career being crowned in 1904 with a doctorate received from the Ruprecht Karl University of Heidelberg. The work was supervised by Wilhelm Heinrich Erb who had a background in Histology and Toxicology (although he later switched his focus to Neurology). Huch's dissertation, based on 27 case studies, was a study of stomach cancer in younger adults. Having passed the necessary national exams he embarked on a career as a medical doctor. Fairly soon after completing his qualifications he relocated to South America where his maternal grandfather, the adventurer and travel writer Friedrich Gerstäcker had undertaken a number of lengthy tours during the middle decades of the century and where at least one of his uncles was building a career as a businessman. Felix Huch himself stayed three years in South America. On returning to Germany he settled in Bautzen, a small town in the mountains to the east of Dresden. Here he pursued his career as a doctor with the state medical service. By the time she died in 1934 his mother was living with him at Bautzen. After his mother's death he relocated to Würzburg in Bavarian Lower Franconia. He was still living at Würzburg in 1950. Around this time, having retired completely from the medical service, he moved again, settling this time in Bad Godesberg, slightly more than an hour's walk upriver from the birth place of Ludwig van Beethoven in the adjacent (but still, till 1959, resolutely separate) municipality of Bonn. He lived during his final months in the (South German) Ammerland region, close to the Starnbergersee ("Lake Starnberg"). It was here that he died in the little lakeside town of Tutzing.

== Works ==
The Musician Bio-novels for which he became known were written, according to Huch on the basis of what amounted to a vocation or compulsion. "Musik hieß mich schreiben" (loosely, "Music called me to write") was the title he selected for an autobiographical summary that he contributed to "Welt und Wort" in 1951. The first of these books was "Der junge Beethoven" ("Young Beethoven"), which appeared in 1927. That was followed by "Beethovens Vollendung", published in 1931: in this he applied a similar approach to the composer's later life. Huch's book on "Mozart" appeared in 1941. (Note: "Mozart – Der Roman seines Werdens" (loosely, "Becoming Mozart").) Here again, there was a follow-up work: "Mozart in Vienna"was published in 1948.

Two other bio-novels by Huch, produced towards the end of his life, did not concern musicians and were less commercially successful: they are nevertheless referenced in sources. "Dresdner Capriccio, die Geschichte einer jungen Liebe" ("Dresden Capriccio, the story of a young love") was published in 1948 and is based on the life of his grandfather, the travel writer adventurer Friedrich Gerstäcker. "Der Kaiser von Mexiko" ("The Emperor of Mexico") appeared a year later, in 1949. It is based on the story of Archduke Ferdinand Maximilian Joseph Maria von Habsburg-Lothringen, who found himself installed as "Emperor of Mexico" between 1864 and his execution in 1867, due to a tragic-comedic scheme choreographed by the French emperor, apparently as a rejoinder to the recent discovery in North America of the "Monroe Doctrine".
