= Germelshausen =

1860 literary work

Germelshausen is an 1860 short story by Friedrich Gerstäcker.

== Plot ==
The story concerns a cursed village that sank into the earth long ago and is permitted to appear for only one day every century. The protagonist is a young artist (Arnold) who happens to be traversing the area as the town appears. He encounters, and becomes smitten with, a young woman (Gertrud) from Germelshausen. The romantic tale ends with him leaving the vicinity just in time to avoid becoming entombed with the village and its denizens, but thereby being forever separated from his love.

== Motif ==
The basic concept is an old German motif that appears in works of Müller, Heine, Uhland and others. The curse may affect a town, a castle or even a single house, but the narrative content remains largely unchanged.

== Impact ==
Germelshausen is widely credited as having inspired the musical Brigadoon. However, Lerner denied that he had based the book on an older story, and, in an explanation published in The New York Times, stated that he did not learn of the existence of the Germelshausen story until after he had completed the first draft of Brigadoon. Lerner said that in his subsequent research, he found many other legends of disappearing towns in various countries' folklore, and he pronounced their similarities "unconscious coincidence".
