= Gustav Huguenin =

Swiss internist and pathologist (1840–1920)

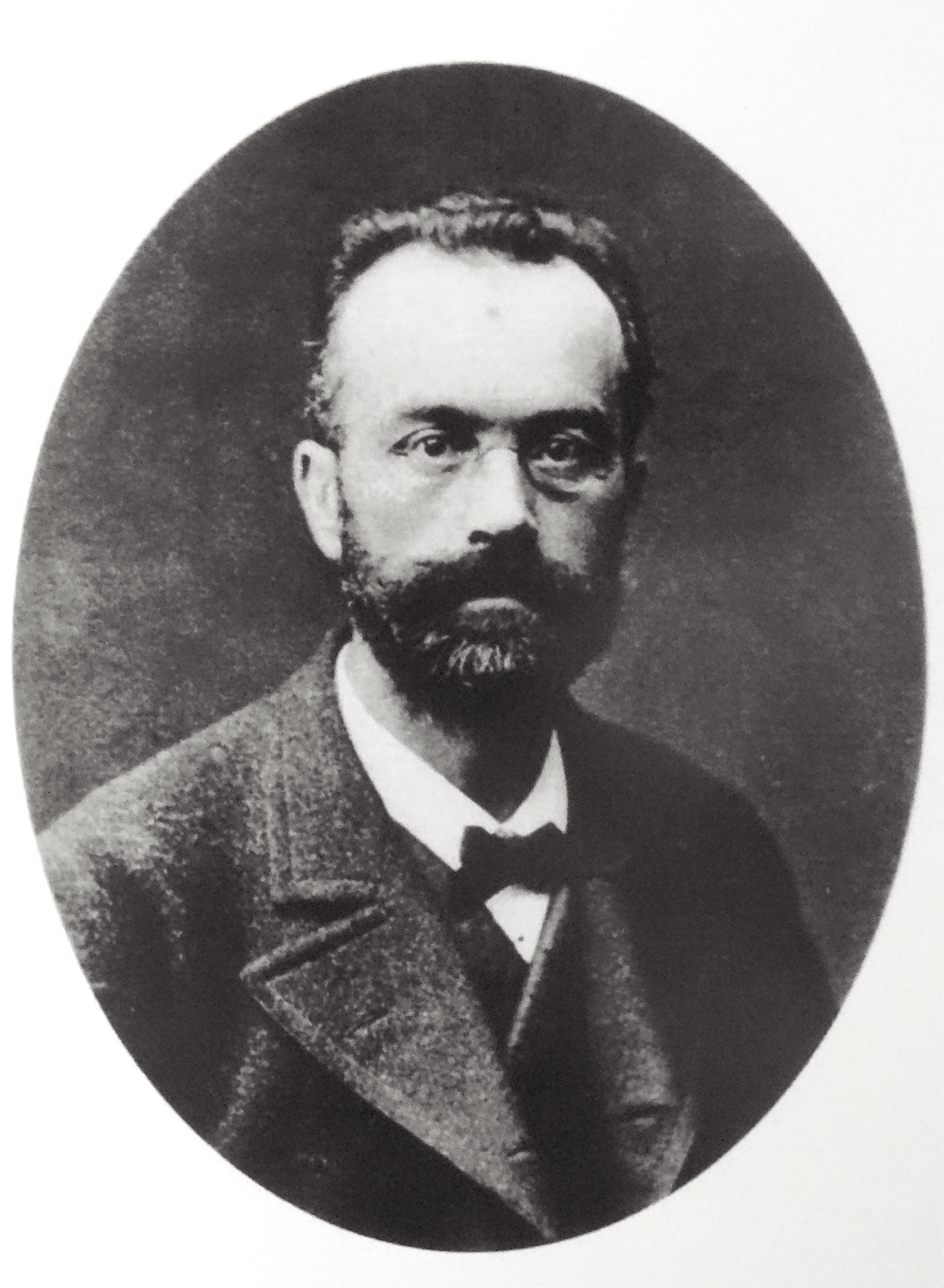
Gustav Huguenin

Gustav Huguenin (17 July 1840 – 6 February 1920) was a Swiss internist and pathologist who was a native of Krauchthal.

== Biography ==
He studied medicine at the Universities of Zürich, Prague, Vienna and Berlin, obtaining his medical doctorate in 1864. As a student he had as instructors: neurologist Wilhelm Griesinger (1817–1868), surgeon Theodor Billroth (1829–1894) and internist Michael Anton Biermer (1827–1892).

In 1873 he succeeded Bernhard von Gudden (1824–1886) as director of the Burghölzli Psychiatric Hospital. From 1874 he served as director of the medical clinic in Zurich, offering his resignation in 1883 for health reasons. Afterwards, he practiced medicine in Zürich and Weissenburg.

Huguenin specialized in research of brain and nerve disorders. He contributed treatises on encephalitis, meningitis, et al. to Hugo von Ziemssen's Handbuch der Speciellen Pathologie und Therapie. Other written works of his include:

- Allgemeine Pathologie der Krankheiten des Nervensystems, 1873 – General pathology of diseases of the nervous system.
- Oedem des Hirns, Hydrocephalus, 1878 – Edema of the brain, Hydrocephalus.
- Anatomie Des Centres Nerveux, 1879 – Anatomy of the central nervous system
- L'eau thermale de Weissenbourg en Suisse (Oberland bernois), 1893 – Thermal water of Weissenbourg, Switzerland (Bernese Oberland).
- Publication about Dr. Huguenin:
- "Der Internist Gustav Huguenin (1840–1920)" by Heinz Lätsch, Juris Druck & Verlag, (1991), ISBN 3-260-05285-2 (3-260-05285-2).
