= Oskar Farner =

Swiss Protestant church historian (1884–1958)

Oskar Farner (22 September 1884 - 16 July 1958) was a Swiss Protestant church historian, specialising in research into Huldrych Zwingli. He was a member of the Zwingli Association.

== Life ==
Born in Unterstammheim, he was a son of Alfred Farner († 1908), a pastor in the reformed church in that town. He studied theology at the University of Basel, attending lectures by Paul Wernle. He continued his studies at the universities of Marburg, Berlin and Zürich. In 1908 he became a pastor in Zollikon and in 1916 married Mary Wieser (1891–1963). In 1931 he was awarded an honorary doctorate by the theological faculty at the University of Basel.

From 1937 to 1950 he was a pastor at the Grossmünster in Zürich. During this time, in 1942, he published a 'Christmas Letter on Jews in Switzerland', in which he pointed out that Adolf Hitler had targeted first the Jews and then the whole of Christianity. The letter was signed by thirty-seven people, including Karl Barth, Emil Brunner and Eberhard Vischer It is probably the first document in Christian history in which Christians admitted guilt for Christianity's anti-Semitic acts.

From 1932 he was in the church council and from 1947 to 1955 was its president as well as editor in chief of the Kirchenboten für den Kanton Zürich. In 1951 he contacted the leading men in the German-Swiss evangelical-reformed state churches to contact the leaders of the German Evangelical Church Assembly - as a result in 1952 over 3,000 Swiss people participated in the Stuttgart Church Assembly. In 1954 he received an honorary doctorate from the philosophy faculty at the University of Zürich.

=== Research ===
In 1930 his habilitation thesis Patron Saints in the Canton of Grisons - Their Significance for Researching the Earliest Missionary History of Switzerland gained him a role as a privatdozent in church history at the theological faculty at the University of Zürich. From 1938 to 1954 he was an adjunct professor there.

He primarily focussed on Zwingli, producing several translations, commentaries and interpretations. He also researched the Reformation in Zürich. He published articles in Zwingliana and other journals.

== Selected writings ==
- Zwinglis Bedeutung für die Gegenwart. Beer, Zürich 1919.
- Zwinglis häusliches Leben. Buchdr. Berichthaus, Zürich 1919.
- Die Kirchenpatrozinien des Kantons Graubünden auf ihre Bedeutung für die Erforschung der ältesten Missions-Geschichte der Schweiz. E. Reinhardt, München 1925.
- Das Zwinglibild Luthers. Mohr, Tübingen 1931.
- Die Chronik von Huldrych Zwinglis Sterben. Buchdruckerei Berichthaus, Zürich 1931.
- with Leonhard von Muralt: Von göttlicher und menschlicher Gerechtigkeit; sozialpolitische Schriften für die Gegenwart. Rascher, Zürich/Leipzig/Stuttgart 1934.
- with Fritz Deringer: Das erste Jahrhundert der Sekundarschule Stammheim, 1837–1937. Buchdr. W. Hepting, Andelfingen 1937.
- Lavaters Jugend. Zwingli-Verlag, Zürich 1939.
- with Emil Brunner: Zürcher Kirchengesetz und christliche Kirche: Bericht der theologischen Subkommission über die Beziehungen zwischen Kirche und Staat. Schulthess, Zürich 1939.
- Land! Land! Worte von Johann Caspar Lavater. Zwingli-Verlag, Zürich 1941.
- with Hans Hoffmann. Otto Münch; Ernst Winizki: Die große Wende in Zürich: Otto Münchs Zwingli-Türe am Großmünster. Zwingli-Verlag, Zürich 1941.
- with Carl Ludwig: Das Gebot der Stunde: Was erwartet unser Volk von seiner Kirche? Evangel. Verlag, Zollikon-Zürich 1942.
- Der Untervogt und seine Frau: vier Bilder aus der Reformationszeit alten Berichten nachgezeichnet. Zwingli-Verlag, Zürich 1943.
- Gott ist Meister: Zwingli-Worte für unsere Zeit. Zwingli-Verlag, Zürich 1944.
- with Karl Barth, Paul Vogt: Die evangelische Kirche in Deutschland nach dem Zusammenbruch des Dritten Reiches. Evangelischer Verlag, Zollikon-Zürich 1945.
- Martin Luther: ein Wort des Gedächtnisses. Evangelischer Verlag, Zollikon-Zürich 1946.
- Der Reformator Huldrych Zwingli; sein Leben und Schaffen. Zwingli-Verlag, Zürich 1949.
- Der Fuhrmann Gottes Ein Zwingli-Schauspiel in 5 Bildern. Zwingli-Verlag, Zürich 1949.
- with Leo Juda: Katechismen. M. Niehans, Zürich 1955.
- Aus Zwinglis Predigten zu Jesaja und Jeremia. Unbekannte Nachschriften, ausgewählt und sprachlich bearbeitet von Oskar Farner. Verlag Berichthaus, Zürich 1957.
- Aus Zwinglis Predigten zu Matthäus, Markus und Johannes unbekannte Nachschriften. Verl. Berichthaus, Zürich 1957.
- Huldrych Zwingli. 4 Bde. Zürich 1943–1960
- Reformatorische Erneuerung von Kirche und Volk in Zürich und in der Eidgenossenschaft 1525–1531. Zürich 1960.
- Wegmarken zur Besinnung über den Dienst der Kirche. Zwingli-Verlag, Zürich/Stuttgart 1962.

== Bibliography ==
- (in German) Oskar Farner. In: Zwingliana Nr. 2 v. 1958.

== External links (in German) ==
- Alfred Schindler: Oskar Farner. In: Historisches Lexikon der Schweiz.
- Bibliographie Oskar Farner. In: Zwingliana. 11/1. 1959.
- Nachtrag zur Bibliographie Oskar Farner. In: Zwingliana. 12/4. 1965.
- Oskar Farner. In: Matrikeledition der Universität Zürich.
