= Geraldine Katt =

Austrian actress

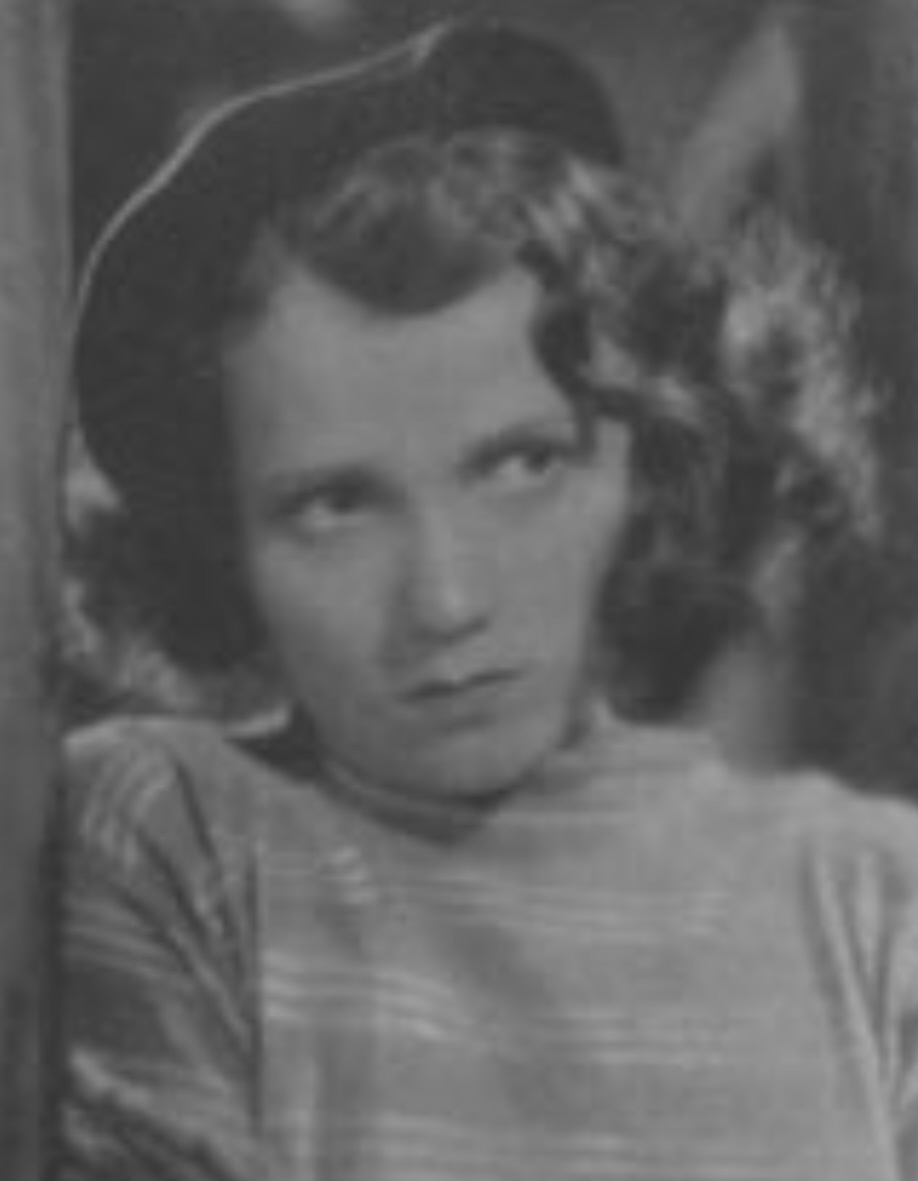
- Born: 4 February 1920; Vienna, Austria
- Died: 9 November 1995 (aged 75)
- Occupation: Actress
- Years active: 1936–1951

Geraldine Kattnig (4 February 1920 – 9 November 1995) was an Austrian actress. She appeared in more than ten films from 1936 to 1951.

== Selected filmography ==
Year	Title	Role	Notes
1936	The Girl Irene	Baba Lawerence	
1938	The Deruga Case	Mingo	
1951	Four in a Jeep	Steffi	
1951	Night on Mont Blanc	Frau Schnackendorf	
