= Marie Baum =

German politician (1874–1964)

Member of the National Assembly
- In office 1919–1920
- Constituency: Schleswig-Holstein

Personal details
- Born: 23 March 1874 Danzig, West Prussia, German Empire
- Died: 8 August 1964 (aged 90) Heidelberg, West Germany
- Party: German Democratic Party (DDP)

Marie Baum (23 March 1874 – 8 August 1964), was a German politician of the German Democratic Party (DDP) and social activist. She was one of the first female members of the Weimar National Assembly. She was a pioneer within German welfare and workers security. From 1897 to 1899 Baum, who trained as a chemist, worked at the ETH Zürich, afterwards she moved to Berlin, where she started to engage in politics and social welfare in 1902. In 1919, representing the German Democratic Party, she was elected a member of the Weimar National Assembly for Schleswig-Holstein.

== Life ==
Marie Baum was born in Danzig, West Prussia, German Empire (now Gdańsk, Poland) on 23 March 1874. She was one of six children; her father was a hospital director. She studied chemistry at the University of Zürich, where she met Ricarda Huch, passing her teaching examinations in 1897 and then gaining her doctorate in 1899. From 1897 to 1899 she worked at the ETH Zürich, and afterwards she moved to Berlin, where she worked as a chemist at the Anilin Manufacturing Company. Baum worked as a factory inspector from 1902 to 1907, which exposed her to the working conditions of women throughout the country, and she began to engage in politics and social welfare. . She began to publish social science papers around this time. In 1919, representing the German Democratic Party, she was elected a member of the Weimar National Assembly for Schleswig-Holstein. She was one of the first female members of the Weimar National Assembly.

Baum advocated for better working conditions and for public welfare. She later became involved in advocating for the victims of the Nazi regime.

Baum died in Heidelberg on 8 August 1964.

== Works ==
- Grundriss der Gesundheitsfürsorge, München 1923
- Familienfürsorge, Karlsruhe 1928
- Das Familienleben in der Gegenwart. 182 Familienmonographien, Berlin 1930
- Rückblick auf mein Leben, Heidelberg 1950
- Leuchtende Spur. Das Leben Ricarda Huchs, Tübingen 1950
- Aus einem Lebensbild Anna von Gierkes, in: Mädchenbildung und Frauenschaffen, Heft 2/1952, Seiten 1–12.
- Anna von Gierke. Ein Lebensbild, Weinheim/Basel 1954
- Introduction to The Diary of Anne Frank, Amsterdam 1950
