= Friedrich Huch =

German writer (1873–1913)

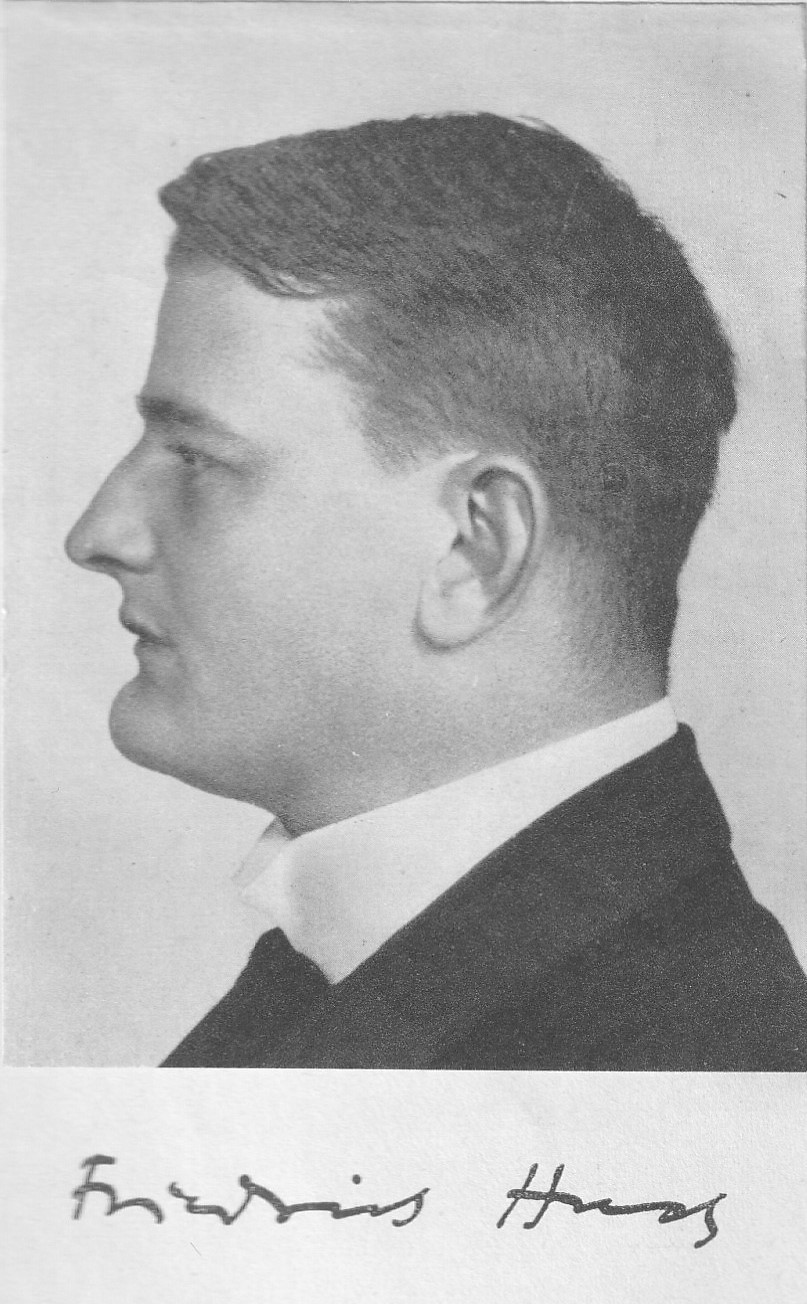
Friedrich Huch

Friedrich Huch (Braunschweig, 19 June 1873 – Munich, 12 May 1913) was a German writer.

== Life ==
One of his nephews was Friedrich Gerstäcker and one of his cousins was Ricarda Huch on his mother's side. His father killed himself in 1888.

After his Reifeprüfung in Dresden, he studied philosophy at the Ludwig-Maximilians-Universität München, the University of Paris, and the University of Erlangen. He worked as a personal tutor in Hamburg and Lubocheń, Poland, and travelled through Italy before moving to Munich to become an independent writer.

At the age of 39, he died unexpectedly because of complications after a middle ear surgical procedure. Thomas Mann said his panegyric.

== Works ==
- Peter Michel, Hamburg, Janssen, 1901.
- Geschwister, Berlin, Fischer, 1903.
- Träume, Berlin, Fischer, 1904.
- Wandlungen, Berlin, Fischer, 1905.
- Mao, Berlin, Fischer, 1907.
- Pitt und Fox. Die Liebeswege der Brüder Sintrup, Ebenhausen bei München, Langewiesche-Brand, 1909.
- Enzio, Munich, Mörike, 1911.
- Tristan und Isolde. Lohengrin. Der fliegende Holländer. Drei groteske Komödien, Munich, Mörike, 1911.
- Erzählungen, Munich, Georg Müller, 1914.
- Neue Träume, Munich, Georg Müller, 1914. Ausgabe von 1920 mit 20 Illustrationen von Alfred Kubin.
- Romane der Jugend, Berlin, Fischer, 1934.
