= Burghölzli =

Psychiatric hospital in Switzerland

Coordinates: 47.3527°N 8.5706°E

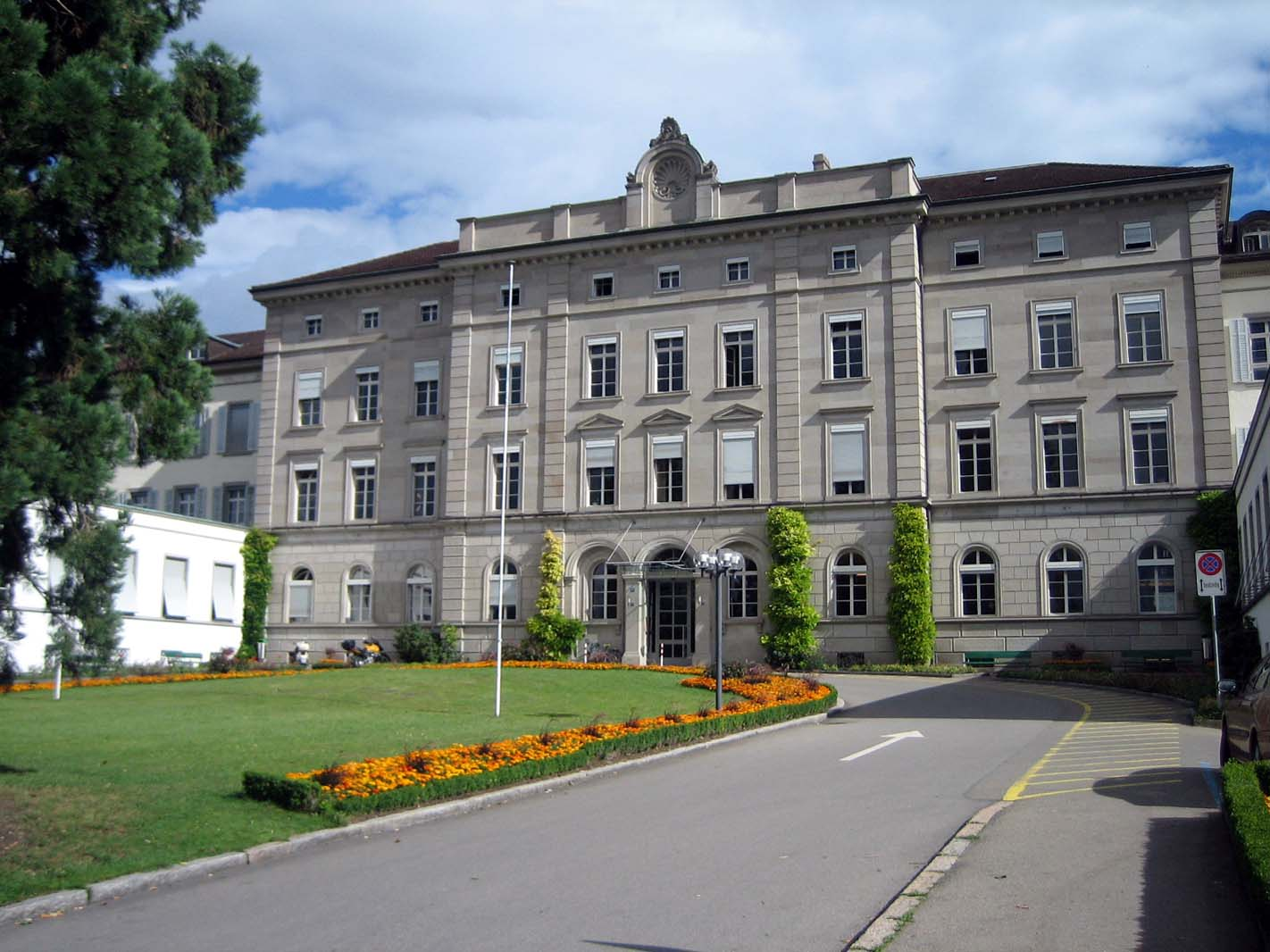
- Burghölzli

Geography
- Location: Zürich, Switzerland

Links
- Lists: Hospitals in Switzerland

Burghölzli, named after the wooded hill in the district of Riesbach in southeastern Zürich where it is located, is the Psychiatrische Universitätsklinik Zürich ('Psychiatric University Hospital Zürich'), a psychiatric hospital in Switzerland. As a research hospital, it is associated with the University of Zürich.

== History ==
Before the construction of dedicated state-run institutions, most people with mental illnesses and disabilities were housed privately. A "counting of the insane" (Irrenzählung) in 1851 found that less than 10 percent of the 1281 individuals identified in the canton of Zurich were in the care of hospitals, most of which lacked dedicated psychiatric wards. In 1817, the city of Zürich had established such a ward in its "Old Hospital" (Altes Spital) in the centre of the old town. Initially, it provided 24 cells for mentally ill individuals. In the 1840s, the entire facility was converted to exclusively house chronically and mentally ill patients. The conditions in the Old Hospital were the subject of frequent criticism, which catalysed proposals for the construction of new asylums. By 1863, plans for a new asylum in the Burghölzli area had been completed. In 1864, the cantonal parliament voted to begin construction of the facility. This expansion of psychiatric care came at a time during which public discourse, both in Switzerland and in other European countries, frequently framed the availability of inpatient care for the mentally ill as an indicator of societal progress.

Wilhelm Griesinger was instrumental in the planning of the new asylum. Although he died before the building was established in 1870, he is considered the founder of the Burghölzli. From 1870 until 1879, the hospital had three directors, Bernhard von Gudden, Gustav Huguenin and Eduard Hitzig. All three men focused on neuropsychiatry, with brain pathology and physiology being the general focus of their research.

Auguste-Henri Forel was the fourth director of Burghölzli, and spent nearly twenty years at the helm. Forel conducted hypnosis experiments on both patients and staff, as well as teaching the method to his students. A staunch advocate of eugenics, he conducted sterilization procedures at the clinic during his tenure. While the cited indications at the time were of a therapeutic nature, he later wrote that this had been a "pretense", and that the only true purpose of these procedures had been a social one. Forced sterilizations of mentally ill patients would continue under his successors.

In 1898 Eugen Bleuler became director of the Burghölzli, where he would remain until 1927. The "Bleuler era" is considered the most illustrious period at the hospital, largely due to the advent of psychoanalysis, usage of Freudian psychiatric theories, and the creative work of Bleuler's assistant, Carl Gustav Jung. Bleuler was followed as director by Hans-Wolfgang Maier and afterwards by his son Manfred Bleuler.

In addition to Jung, many renowned psychiatrists spent part of their career at the Burghölzli, including Karl Abraham, Ludwig Binswanger, Eugène Minkowski, Hermann Rorschach, Franz Riklin, Constantin von Monakow, Eugen Bleuler, Ernst Rüdin, Adolf Meyer, Abraham Brill and Emil Oberholzer. Albert Einstein's son, Eduard Einstein was a patient at Burghölzli, as was James Joyce's daughter Lucia Joyce. Today the Burghölzli is an important center for psychiatric research and the treatment of mental illness. The controversial Ewen Cameron studied at Burghölzli in the late 1920s.

On March 6, 1971, a fire broke out at the clinic; 28 elderly male patients died from asphyxiation. There were bars on the windows, frustrating the attempts of rescuers to save lives.

== Trivia ==
The fictitious 2007 Swiss mystery film Marmorera was filmed among others, at the Bürghölzli sanatory in the Weinegg district of Zürich, on the river Limmat near Technopark Zürich, at the Limmatquai promenade, and on the Münsterbrücke river crossing towards Münsterhof.
