= Eugen Bleuler =

Swiss psychiatrist (1857–1939)

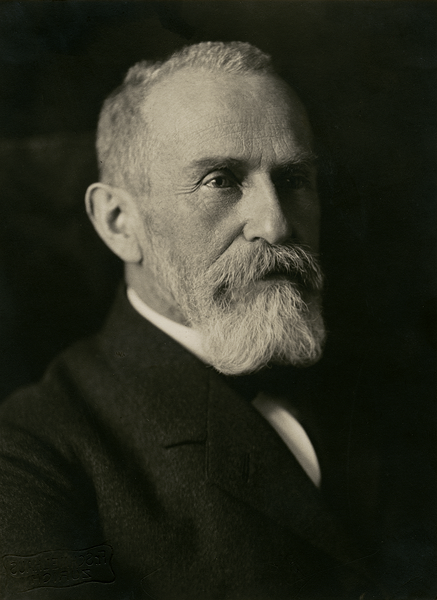
- Born: Paul Eugen Bleuler; 30 April 1857; Zollikon, Switzerland
- Died: 15 July 1939 (aged 82); Zollikon, Switzerland
- Education: University of Zürich
- Known for: Coining the terms schizophrenia, schizoid, autism
- Spouse: Hedwig Bleuler-Waser
- Children: 5
- Scientific career
- Fields: Psychiatry
- Workplaces: Rheinau Psychiatric Clinic; Burghölzli Hospital; University of Zürich
- Doctoral advisors: Jean-Martin Charcot; Bernhard von Gudden
- Doctoral students: Carl Jung
- Other notable students: Medard Boss; Eugène Minkowski

Paul Eugen Bleuler (/ˈblɔɪlər/ BLOY-lər; Swiss Standard German: [ˈɔʏɡeːn ˈblɔʏlər, ˈɔʏɡn̩]; 30 April 1857 – 15 July 1939) was a Swiss psychiatrist and eugenicist most notable for his influence on modern concepts of mental illness. He coined several psychiatric terms including schizophrenia, schizoid, autism, depth psychology and what Sigmund Freud called "Bleuler's happily chosen term 'ambivalence'". Bleuler remains a controversial figure in psychiatric history for his racist and ableist beliefs, as well as his implementation of eugenic practises in psychiatry based on these beliefs, most notably at the Burghölzli clinic in Zurich.

== Personal life ==
Bleuler was born in Zollikon, a town near Zürich in Switzerland, to Johann Rudolf Bleuler (1823–1898), a wealthy farmer, and Pauline Bleuler-Bleuler (1829–1898). He married Hedwig Bleuler-Waser, one of the first women to receive her doctorate from the University of Zurich.

== Career ==
Bleuler studied medicine in Zürich. He trained for his psychiatric residency at Waldau Hospital under Gottlieb Burckhardt, a Swiss psychiatrist, from 1881 to 1884. He left his job in 1884 and spent one year on medical study trips with Jean-Martin Charcot, a French neurologist in Paris, Bernhard von Gudden, a German psychiatrist in Munich, and to London. After these trips, he returned to Zürich to briefly work as assistant to Auguste Forel while completing his psychiatric residency at the Burghölzli, a university hospital.

Bleuler became the director of a psychiatric clinic in Rheinau, a hospital located in an old monastery on an island in the Rhine. At the time, the clinic was known for being functionally backward and largely ineffective. Because of this, Bleuler set about improving conditions for the patients residing there.

In the year 1898, Bleuler returned to the Burghölzli and became a psychiatry professor at Burghölzli, the same university hospital at which he completed his residency. He was also appointed director of the mental asylum in Rheinau. He served as the director from the years 1898 to 1927. While working at this asylum, Bleuler cared for long-term psychiatric patients. He also implemented both psychoanalytic treatment and research, and was influenced by Sigmund Freud.

During his time as the director of psychiatry at Burghölzli, Bleuler made great contributions to the field of psychiatry and psychology that made him known today. Given these findings, Bleuler has been described as one of the most influential Swiss psychiatrists.

== Relationship with Freud and Jung ==
Following his interest in hypnotism, especially in its "introspective" variant, Bleuler became interested in Sigmund Freud's work. He favorably reviewed Josef Breuer and Freud's Studies on Hysteria.

Like Freud, Bleuler believed that complex mental processes could be unconscious. He encouraged his staff at the Burghölzli to study unconscious and psychotic mental phenomena. Influenced by Bleuler, Carl Jung and Franz Riklin used word association tests to integrate Freud's theory of repression with empirical psychological findings. As a series of letters demonstrates, Bleuler performed a self-analysis with Freud, beginning in 1905. Bleuler laid the foundation for a less fatalistic view of the course and outcome of psychotic disorders along with C. G. Jung, who further used Bleuler's theory of ambivalence and association experiments to diagnose neurotic illnesses.

Bleuler found Freud's movement to be overly dogmatic and resigned from the International Psychoanalytic Association in 1911, writing to Freud that "this 'all or nothing' is in my opinion necessary for religious communities and useful for political parties...but for science I consider it harmful". Bleuler remained interested in Freud's work, citing him favorably, for example, in his often reprinted Textbook of Psychiatry (1916). He also supported the nomination of Freud for the Nobel Prize in the late twenties.

== Dementia Praecox, or the Group of Schizophrenias ==
Bleuler introduced the term "schizophrenia" in a Berlin lecture on 24 April 1908. However, he and his colleagues had been using the term in Zurich to replace Emil Kraepelin's term dementia praecox since 1907. He revised and expanded his schizophrenia concept in his seminal study of 1911, Dementia Praecox, oder Gruppe der Schizophrenien (Dementia Praecox, or Group of Schizophrenias). This was translated into English in 1950 (by Joseph Zinkin).

Bleuler distinguished between positive and negative symptoms of schizophrenia. Positive symptoms include symptoms not found in unaffected people, such as hallucinations or delusions. Negative symptoms describe the absence of typical experiences such as social withdrawal or lack of pleasure. Bleuler also distinguished between basic and accessory symptoms as well as primary and secondary symptoms. Basic symptoms are those that are present in every case of schizophrenia, whereas accessory symptoms vary depending on the patient. Bleuler defined primary symptoms as those that are directly related to neurobiological processes. He defined secondary symptoms as behavioral reactions to primary symptoms. Differentiating these symptoms contributed to an increased understanding of schizophrenia in general.

Like Kraepelin, Bleuler argued that dementia praecox, or "the schizophrenias", was a physical disease process characterized by exacerbations and remissions. He argued that no one was ever completely "cured" of schizophrenia; there was always some sort of lasting cognitive weakness or defect that was manifest in behavior. Unlike Kraepelin, Bleuler believed that the overall prognosis was not uniformly grim. He believed "dementia" was a secondary symptom not directly caused by the underlying biological process. There were three other "fundamental symptoms" that included deficits in associations, affectivity, and ambivalence. He believed the biological disease was much more prevalent in the population due to its "simple" and "latent" forms.

Bleuler's changes to Kraepelin's dementia praecox were accepted by countries such as Switzerland and Britain. However, some countries, such as Germany, did not accept these changes at first. Bleuler's concept of schizophrenia was pushed aside due to its similarities to Kraepelin's dementia praecox. It was only widely accepted after Kraepelin's disease classification did not have direct evidence nor was it directly expressed in his patients.

In 1911, Bleuler wrote, "When the disease process flares up, it is more correct, in my view, to talk in terms of deteriorating attacks, rather than its recurrence. Of course the term recurrence is more comforting to a patient and his relatives than the notion of progressively deteriorating attacks". The eugenic sterilization of persons diagnosed with (and viewed as predisposed to) schizophrenia was advocated by Bleuler. He argued that racial deterioration would result from the propagation of "mental and physical cripples." In his Textbook of Psychiatry, Bleuler states,

The more severely burdened should not propagate themselves...If we do nothing but make mental and physical cripples capable of propagating themselves, and the healthy stocks have to limit the number of their children because so much has to be done for the maintenance of others, if natural selection is generally suppressed, then unless we will get new measures our race must rapidly deteriorate.

In 1917, Bleuler discussed the heredity involved in schizophrenia after psychiatrist Ernst Rudin published his findings. Bleuler agreed with Rudin that having a family member with schizophrenia increases an individual's chance of also having the disease. However, Bleuler found that Rudin's study did not use sufficient sampling methods, threatening the integrity of the study. While researching further, Bleuler made several conclusions that differed from Rudin's. First, that the schizophrenic gene was not a dominant trait. Second, the disease involves a dihybrid, complex gene and does not include a monohybrid gene. Bleuler also said that there may be a polymorphic aspect to schizophrenia, meaning it presents itself in different forms.

Bleuler found that in order for schizophrenia to present itself in patients, several elements must come together. He found that there are a wide variety of symptoms associated with schizophrenia that can lead to a potential diagnosis. Bleuler concluded that several aspects of the disease are not genetically inherited. These tend to be behavioral aspects and positive symptoms, including hallucinations, delusions, and strange ideas.

He believed the disease's central characteristics were the product of splitting between the emotional and the intellectual functions of the personality. He favored early discharge from hospital into a community environment to avoid institutionalization.

== Diagnosis of Vaslav Nijinsky ==
In March 1919, Bleuler was consulted regarding the mental health of the celebrated Russian ballet dancer Vaslav Nijinsky. Nijinsky's wife, Romola, had approached Bleuler in Zürich upon the recommendation of another physician, detailing her husband's increasingly erratic and obsessive behavior. Bleuler initially remarked to her that the symptoms she described "in the case of an artist and a Russian do not prove in themselves any mental disorder." However, after seeing Nijinsky for a brief ten-minute examination the following day, Bleuler's assessment drastically changed. In his medical notes, Bleuler diagnosed Nijinsky as a "confused schizophrenic with mild manic excitement" and informed Romola that the condition was incurable. Following this diagnosis, Nijinsky was involuntarily committed to the Burghölzli psychiatric hospital under Bleuler's direction.

== Further contributions ==
Bleuler also explored the concept of moral idiocy, and the relationship between neurosis and alcoholism. He followed Freud's perspective of seeing sexuality as a potent influence upon anxiety, pondered on the origins of the sense of guilt, and studied the process of what he defined as switching (the affective shift from love to hate, for example).

Bleuler was known for his clinical observation and willingness to let symptoms speak for themselves. He was also known for his skillful expository writings. Bleuler has never been credited with healing his patients. Like Sigmund Freud he experimented on patients in his care; many were sterilised and many committed suicide.

Later in his life, Bleuler studied and published works on psychoids. He defined the psychoid as the capacity to respond and adapt to stimuli, creating permanent changes in the brain and shaping future reactions. Bleuler believed the psychoid to be a cause of psychic development. He also proposed that social, mental, and physical aspects of life are not separate from each other but instead are seen as aspects of a sole life principle. These ideas were not particularly popular among the scientific community and did not receive a great deal of attention.

== Criticism ==
=== Eugenics ===
Like his predecessor Auguste Forel, Bleuler also held eugenic and racist beliefs. He promoted and initiated forced sterilizations and castrations of psychiatric patients diagnosed with schizophrenia. Bleuler believed that preventing these individuals from reproducing would help preserve racial purity. Under his direction at the Burghölzli clinic in Zurich, expert reports were produced supporting surgical interventions on eugenic grounds.

In his seminal 1911 work Dementia Praecox, or the Group of Schizophrenias, Bleuler wrote: "Castration, of course, is of no benefit to the patients themselves. However, it is to be hoped that sterilization will soon be employed on a larger scale... for eugenic reasons." These practices were part of a broader movement in early 20th-century psychiatry that endorsed eugenic policies, influencing Bleuler's implementation of such practices in psychiatric care. Bleuler's advocacy for eugenic sterilization significantly contributed to the widespread adoption of these practices in psychiatric institutions, most notably at the Burghölzli Clinic.

=== Bleuler and the medicalization of schizophrenia ===
Despite being a physician dedicated to healing, Bleuler conceptualized schizophrenia as a chronic and incurable illness, creating a contradiction at the core of his medical philosophy. While a doctor's role is to diagnose in order to treat, Bleuler's classification of schizophrenia as an irreversible condition placed it outside the scope of medicine's ability to cure, reinforcing the idea that those diagnosed were beyond help.

This paradox is particularly striking given that Bleuler expanded on Emil Kraepelin's concept of dementia praecox while rejecting its strictly degenerative prognosis. Although he acknowledged some variability in outcomes, he still framed schizophrenia as a disorder characterized by a "split" from reality that could not be fundamentally reversed. This perspective played a significant role in the medicalization of psychiatric conditions, contributing to a framework that justified eugenic interventions—such as sterilization—rather than treatments focused on recovery. By framing schizophrenia as an irreversible condition, Bleuler reinforced a biomedical model that prioritized control and segregation over healing and reintegration.

In this same vein, he developed what he called udenotherapy, from the ancient Greek οὐδεν (ouden, 'nothing') and θεραπεία (therapeia, 'service', 'care', or 'healing'). This term reflected his belief that illnesses should not be treated with immediate, active intervention but rather allowed to follow their natural course, with passive observation of their decline, in the hope that recovery could occur. However, waiting for symptoms to resolve without intervention risks being viewed as neglect rather than compassionate care.

Institutional therapy under his direction was primarily based on work and occupational engagement. Patients were trained in self-discipline and, in severe cases, subjected to behavioral conditioning. Discharge required suppressing and controlling disruptive secondary symptoms, a process that Bleuler and his successors referred to as "socialization".

By defining schizophrenia as a fixed biological defect rather than a dynamic condition with potential for improvement, Bleuler helped shape psychiatric practices with meaningful consequences for patients:

- Involuntary commitment and institutionalization: His theories justified the long-term confinement of individuals with schizophrenia in asylums rather than efforts to reintegrate them into society.
- Eugenics and sterilization: Framing schizophrenia as a hereditary, incurable illness justified sterilization and other eugenic measures, which Bleuler supported.
- Shifting focus from recovery to management: Instead of prioritizing treatment aimed at healing, the medical model of schizophrenia focused on long-term management, often through coercive and experimental methods. Many patients committed suicide as a result.

== Legacy ==
After Eugen Bleuler's retirement in 1927, Hans Wolfgang Maier continued his work until 1941, when Manfred Bleuler succeeded him. Starting in 1937, he edited new editions of his father's psychiatry textbook, first published in 1916, which already contained eugenic ideas. In the 1937 and 1943 German editions, Manfred Bleuler added articles by racial hygienists such as Hans Luxenburger and Friedrich Meggendorfer. In postwar editions of the widely respected textbook, these additions were removed and replaced with questionable references to psychiatric methods like lobotomy—an early form of psychosurgery—and early neuroleptics (i.e., antipsychotics).

The revision of the textbook after the war—removing references to eugenics and replacing them with methods like lobotomy and neuroleptics—can be seen as an effort to distance psychiatry from its eugenic history, but it also raises questions about the ethics of hiding problematic past practices.

The introduction of lobotomy and neuroleptics after the war, while possibly reflecting a shift in psychiatric treatment approaches, also led to harmful practices. Lobotomies and neuroleptics, despite their widespread use, were highly controversial and later faced ethical scrutiny over their overuse, side effects, and questionable application in vulnerable patients.

== See also ==
- Controversies about psychiatry
- Bleuler's psycho syndrome
- Emil Kraepelin
- Hermann Rorschach
- Pierre Janet
- Wilhelm Wundt
