= Ricarda Huch =

German author (1864–1947)

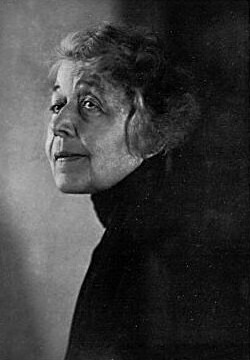
- Ricarda Huch by Wanda von Debschitz-Kunowski

Ricarda Huch (German: [huχ]; 18 July 1864 – 17 November 1947) was a pioneering German intellectual. Trained as a historian, and the author of many works of European history, she also wrote novels, poems, and a play. Asteroid 879 Ricarda is named in her honour.

== Early life and education ==
Huch was born in Braunschweig to Richard Huch (1830–1887) and Emilie, born Hähn (1842–1883), in 1864. The Huchs were a well off merchant family. Her brother Rudolf and cousins Friedrich and Felix were writers. While living with her family in Braunschweig, she corresponded with Ferdinand Tönnies.

Because German universities did not allow women to graduate, Huch left Braunschweig in 1887 and moved to Zurich to take the entrance examinations for the University of Zurich. She matriculated into a PhD program in history and received her doctorate in 1892 for a dissertation on "The neutrality of the Confederation during the Spanish War of Succession" (Die Neutralität der Eidgenossenschaft während des spanischen Erbfolgekrieges). While at the University of Zurich, she established lasting friendships with Marie Baum, Hedwig Bleuler-Waser and Marianne Plehn, who like her had come to Zurich to study.

After receiving her doctorate she found employment at the Zurich public library. In 1896 she taught at a girls' school in Bremen.

== Early publications and historic studies ==
In the 1890s Huch published her first poems and stories. In 1892 her first novel was published Erinnerungen von Ludolf Ursleu dem Jüngeren. In 1897 Huch moved to Vienna to research Romanticism. In Vienna she met the Italian dentist Ermanno Ceconi, whom she married in 1898. In 1899 she gave birth to their daughter Marietta.

In 1899 the first volume of her two volume study on German Romanticism was published, Blütezeit der Romantik. The book launched Huch as contributor to the contemporary cultural discourse in Germany and established her reputation as a historian. Ausbreitung und Verfall der Romantik was published in 1902. Huch argued that German Romanticism went through a period of blossoming and a later period of decay. She argued that August Wilhelm Schlegel, Karl Wilhelm Friedrich Schlegel, Friedrich von Hardenberg, Wilhelm Heinrich Wackenroder and Ludwig Tieck were exponents of early German Romanticism. In this blossoming period utopian thinking and a striving for balance between reason and fantasy, mind and body, culminated in the idea that human perfectibility was a task for everyone. Huch identifies late German Romanticism with a leaning towards simplistic folklore, myth and self-destructive tendencies. She counts Zacharias Werner, Clemens Brentano, Achim von Arnim, Bettina von Arnim and Justinus Kerner among the late and decadent Romantics. Huch lamented the aspirituality and technocentrism of her own day and expressed the hope that after the rejection of Romanticism in the first half of the 19th century the intellectual achievements of Romanticism would be regenerated. Huch emphasised the role of women in early German Romanticism, pointing to the writings of Caroline Schelling, Dorothea von Schlegel, Karoline von Günderrode, Rahel Levin, Bettina von Arnim and Dorothea von Rodde-Schlözer.

Huch's historical research was challenged by her contemporaries. While her meticulous research was admired and her breadth of vision was honoured, she was criticised for poetic imagination. In her days historians would interpret the meaning of historic documents, while Huch focused on conjuring up images by describing contents, symbolism, colour and moods to evoke the world view of a historic period. Her contemporary Toni Wolff identified Huch as a medial historian who had the ability to “evoke historical situations and persons”. This caused bewilderment among her contemporaries, who were used to thinking of history as big events, military campaigns and great men. Instead Huch presented the historic facts and drew character studies of the individuals, with their failures and triumphs. In her historic studies she also charted the lives of ordinary people, such as monks, society ladies and children.

Huch and her husband moved to Trieste and then to Munich. In early 1900 the couple divorced, though Huch remained close to Ceconi. In 1903 Huch's novel Vita somnium breve was published, which was retitled and republished in 1913 as Michael Unger. In 1906 her treatise on Gottfried Keller Die Geschichte von Garibaldi was published. A volume with poetry followed in 1907. In the same year Huch married her cousin Richard Huch, who had divorced from her sister in 1907. In 1908 she published a treatise on the Italian unification Aus dem Zeitalter des Risorgimento.

== Publications during World War I ==
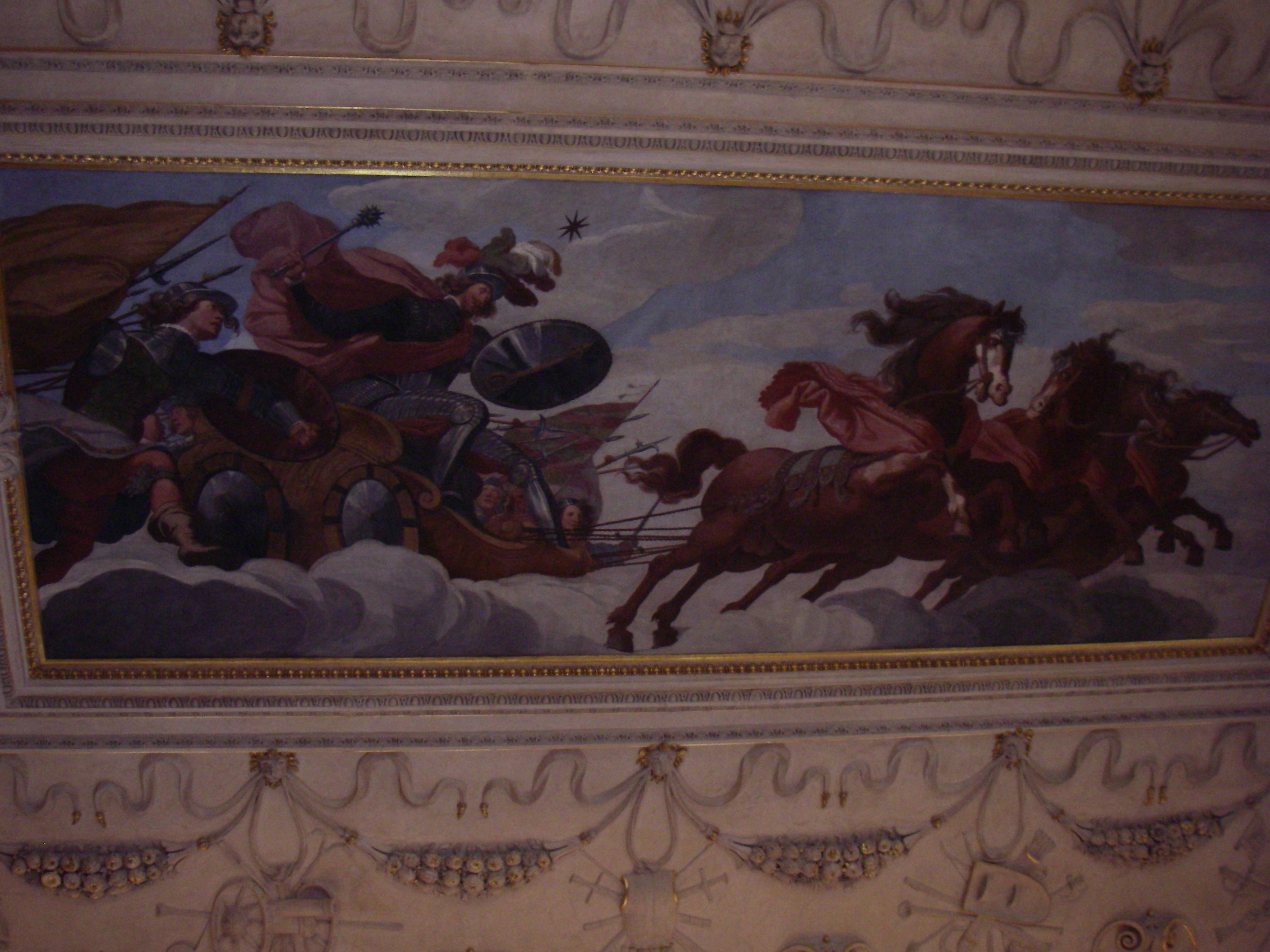
Wallenstein depicted as Mars, the God of war, riding the sky in a chariot pulled by four horses. Ceiling decoration in the main hall of the Wallenstein Palace

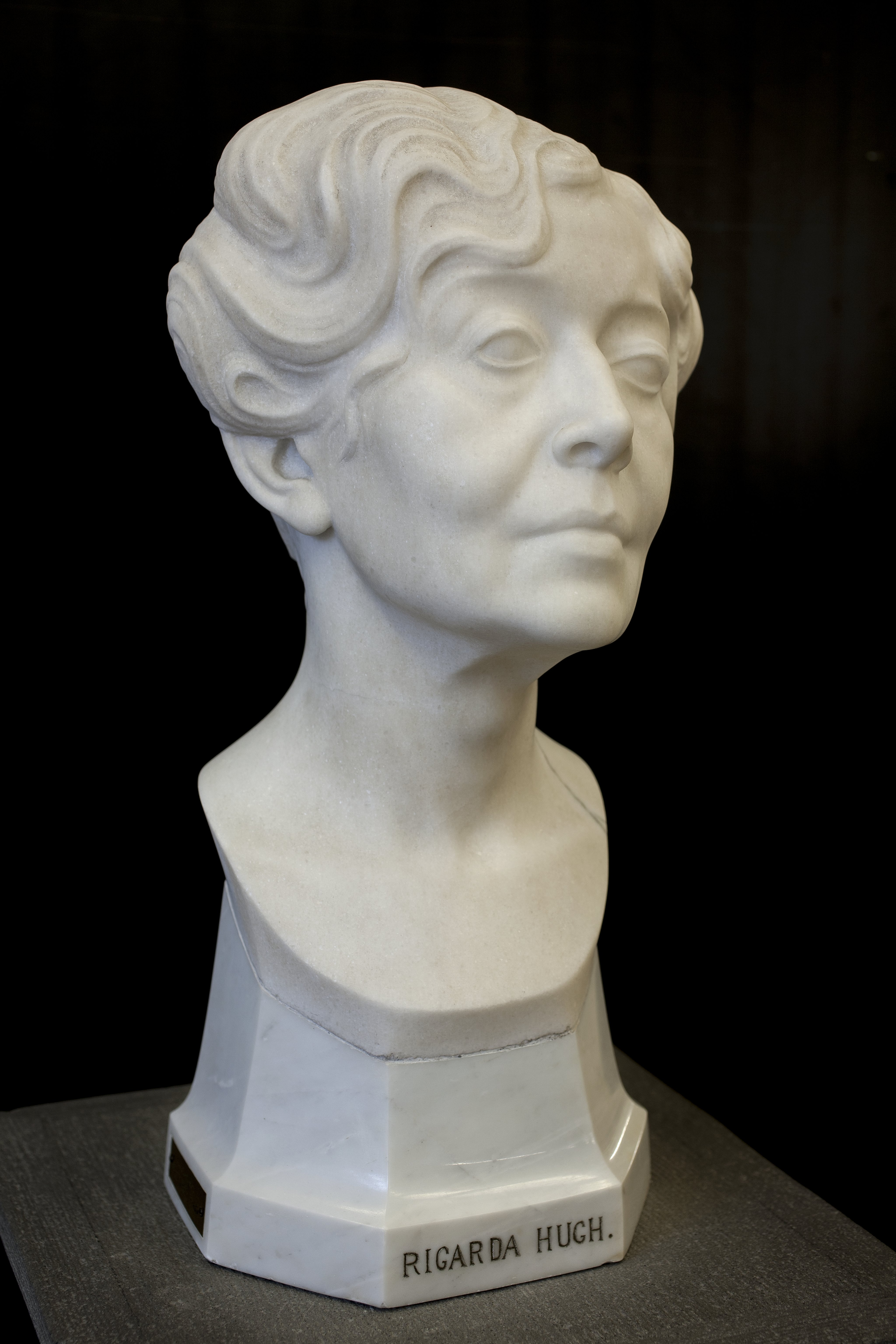
Ricarda Huch; 1916, by the sculptor, Paul Peterich

In 1914 Huch celebrated her fiftieth birthday, three weeks after the assassination of Franz Ferdinand in Sarajevo, her final volume of her trilogy on the Thirty Years' War had just been completed. This trilogy solidified her reputation as one of Germany's foremost historians. During the first years of the World War I Huch lived in Munich. 1915 Huch's character study of Albrecht von Wallenstein was published, Wallenstein - Eine Charakterstudie. In it she chronicled Wallenstein's attempt to renew and unify Germany out of the Holy Roman Empire, which she termed a “degenerate and decadent” Reich. After World War I Huch's interpretation of regenerating Germany through war and violent revolution resonated among nationalists in the defeated Germany.

In 1916 she moved to Switzerland, but returned to Munich in 1918 just before the German Empire collapsed. During the war she had also published Natur und Geist in 1914 and Luthers Glaube in 1916. Just after the war she published Der Sinn der heiligen Schrift in 1919. In her early autobiographical writings Huch had expressed a Lutheran faith combined with a Goethean view of history and the community. In Luthers Glaube she established counter arguments to modern scepticism, emphasising that Martin Luther was a great man of faith rather than the founder of a new church. While Huch emphasised the importance of the home country, and family values, she regarded change as inevitable and valued individuality above all else. Her books on religious and philosophical history conveyed a joined-up view of human beings, human life and history.

== Publications during the Weimar Republic ==
In the early years of the Weimarer Republik Huch published Entpersönlichung in 1921. In 1924 she published a study on the anarchist Michael Bakunin entitled Michael Bakunin und die Anarchie. Her study of the Prussian reformer Heinrich Friedrich Karl vom und zum Stein entitled Stein was published 1925. In 1927 she published in three volumes geographical essays of German cities Im alten Reich. Lebensbilder deutscher Städte. In these essays she describes the structure of old cities, their buildings and important historic events. Huch stressed the particularity of urban organisms and the communal spirit cities generated. Huch also examined the Medieval commune and charted the development of self-governing communities based on personal involvement and solidarity. Huch had first examined the idea of self-reliant communities, which she contrasted to what she perceived as artificial modern societies, in her biography of Bakunin.

In 1927 Huch, her daughter and her son-in-law Franz Böhm moved to Berlin. In 1931 Huch was awarded the Goethe Prize. She was the first woman that was invited to join the Preußische Akademie der Künste (Prussian Academy of Arts). In 1930 her treatise on the German revolutions of 1848–49 was published under the title Alte und neue Götter (1848). Die Revolution des 19. Jahrhunderts in Deutschland.

== Publications during the Third Reich ==
When the Nazis seized power in 1933 and proclaimed the German Dritte Reich, she resigned in protest from the Prussian Academy of Arts. Huch and other members of the academy had in March 1933 received a letter from the president of the Prussian Academy of Arts, Max von Schillings, asking them to sign a declaration drafted by Gottfried Benn, declaring their loyalty to the new government. A public and infamous exchange of letters between Huch and Schillings followed. Huch refused to sign. Schillings responded, expressing the hope that the academy could count on her support and her continuous membership. Huch responded, saying that she will not forgo her right to freedom of expression and asked Schillings whether her refusal to sign the declaration will inevitably lead to her exclusion from the academy. Schillings replied that the academy is merely asking its members to not publicly oppose the new government. Schillings also pointed out that if she resigned, she would be in the company of Heinrich Mann who had resigned from the academy to mount an unsuccessful attempt of mobilising a social democratic alliance against the NSDAP during the March 1933 elections. Schillings argued that this could not be her wish, since she had in her writings clearly expressed nationalist views (although Huch’s nationalism was of the liberal variety). Huch responded, saying that it is natural for a German to feel German, but that she condemned the Nazis' strong-arm tactics, brutal centralization and intimidation of those with other opinions. Huch called the Nazis' tactics un-German, defended her right to freedom of expression and noted that she was not in agreement with the Nazi doctrine.

Huch remained in Berlin and researched early German history, starting with Charles the Great. In 1934 she published the first volume of her trilogy on medieval Germany social history, focusing on various medieval political, social and religious institutions. Römisches Reich Deutscher Nation was followed by Das Zeitalter der Glaubensspaltung in 1937. Huch idealized medieval German culture, and passed comment on leadership, justice and Jews in Germany. Her views were an open challenge to the Nazi doctrine on Germanic culture and its roots. Her son-in-law Böhm was forced out of the public service by the Nazis. In 1936 Huch together with her daughter, Böhm and their son, moved to Jena. Böhm was able to secure a teaching contract with Jena University, but in 1937 he and Huch were accused of sedition because the two had defended the intellectual capacities of Jews at a dinner party. While neither of the two were convicted, Böhm could not maintain his teaching position. During World War II Böhm moved to Freiburg and later to Frankfurt, while Huch and her daughter remained in Jena.

== Publications and work in the post-war period ==
When Jena was to become part of the Soviet zone of occupation Huch fled to West Germany and settled in Frankfurt. She began work on a book celebrating members of the German resistance to Nazism. In March 1946, 13 years after her resignation from the Prussian Academy of Arts she published a public appeal in Germany's daily newspapers asking for help in compiling biographical information on those who had sacrificed their lives to resist the Nazi terror. She reasoned that this ultimate sacrifice had helped all Germans to retain a grain of human dignity during a period of near boundless brutality. Huch argued that those who had resisted allowed all humans to rise from the swamp of everyday routine, light the spark for the fight against the bad and maintain the belief in the noble godliness of humanity.

Huch was the honorary president of the 1947 German Writers' Congress in Frankfurt. She died at the age of 83 in November 1947, her book on the German resistance remained unfinished.

== Legacy ==
Professor Frank Trommler, University of Pennsylvania, in his study of the German literature elite during the Third Reich argues that Huch, along with Ernst Wiechert, Werner Bergengruen, Reinhold Schneider, Albrecht Haushofer and Friedrich Reck-Malleczewen, took a courageous stand on issues such as the suppression of freedom, the fight against tyranny, the longing for privacy and the simple life. Their reputation was grounded in their ability to articulate their opinions and in doing so authors like Huch shaped the political and cultural transformation in Germany after the demise of the Third Reich. These authors were closely observed by Nazi authorities because they were widely read by the German middle-class.

Huch was in her 70s when the Nazi seized power, and unlike authors such as Thomas Mann who first fled into "inner emigration" and then went into exile, she took a stand against the Nazi doctrine from the outset. Huch continued to live in Germany, made no attempt to conceal her convictions and published in Germany through Swiss publishers. In 1934 Mann wrote of his intellectual struggle against the powers that be "Getting through it and maintaining one's own personal dignity and liberty is everything." When Alfred Andersch assessed German literary output during the Nazi reign in 1947 he categorised Huch alongside Gerhart Hauptmann, Rudolf Alexander Schröder, Hans Carossa and Gertrud von Le Fort as older and established poets who had stayed in Germany and upheld a tradition of "bourgeois classicism". Andersch counted the poets Stefan Andres, Horst Lange, Hans Leip, Martin Raschke and Eugen Gottlob Winkler among the younger generation who stayed in Germany and contributed to the resistance against Nazi authorities with their literary work. After World War II Thomas Mann honoured Huch as "the first lady of German letters".

Ricarda Huch's collection Autumn Fire, translated by Timothy Adès and with an introduction by Karen Leeder, was published in November 2024 by Poetry Salzburg. It is the first time that Huch's last poetry collection is available in English translation. Huch was nominated seven times - in 1928, 1935, 1937, and 1946 - for the Nobel Prize in Literature. Especially in 1937 Huch should have received the Nobel Prize. The nomination by Fritz Strich, Professor of German literature, literature historian, University of Bern, Switzerland, was supported by 27 professors from the universities of Bern, Basel, Geneva and Zurich in Switzerland, and Groningen, NL. In the same year she also received nominations by Heinrich Wölfflin, Art historian and a member of the Prussian Academy of Sciences, and Knut Hjalmar Leonard Hammarskjöld, a lawyer, politician, and member of the Swedish Academy.

== Publications by Huch ==
- Gedichte Dresden 1891
- Evoe Berlin 1892
- Erinnerungen von Ludolf Ursleu dem Jüngeren Berlin 1893
- Gedichte Leipzig 1894
- Der Mondreigen von Schlaraffis Leipzig 1896
- Teufeleien, Lügenmärchen Leipzig 1897
- Haduvig im Kreuzgang Leipzig 1897
- Fra Celeste und andere Erzählungen Hermann Haessel Verlag, Leipzig 1899
- Blütezeit der Romantik Leipzig 1899
- Ausbreitung und Verfall der Romantik Leipzig 1902
- Dornröschen. Ein Märchenspiel Leipzig 1902
- Aus der Triumphgasse. Lebensskizzen Leipzig 1902
- Vita somnium breve Insel Verlag, Leipzig 1903
- Von den Königen und der Krone Stuttgart 1904
- Gottfried Keller Schuster & Loeffler, Berlin und Leipzig 1904
- Seifenblasen. Drei scherzhafte Erzählungen Stuttgart 1905
- Die Geschichten von Garibaldi (Volume 1: ‘’Die Verteidigung Roms’’; Volume 2: ‘’Der Kampf um Rom’’) Stuttgart/Leipzig 1906–1907
- Neue Gedichte Leipzig 1908
- Menschen und Schicksale aus dem Risorgimento Leipzig 1908
- Das Leben des Grafen Federigo Confalonieri Leipzig 1910
- Der Hahn von Quakenbrück und andere Novellen Berlin 1910
- Der letzte Sommer Stuttgart 1910
- Der große Krieg in Deutschland Leipzig 1912–1914 (later as: Der Dreißigjährige Krieg Leipzig 1929)
- Natur und Geist als die Wurzeln des Lebens und der Kunst München 1914 (new edition: Vom Wesen des Menschen. Natur und Geist Prien 1922)
- Wallenstein. Eine Charakterstudie Leipzig 1915
- Luthers Glaube. Briefe an einen Freund Leipzig 1916
- Der Fall Deruga Berlin 1917
- Der Sinn der Heiligen Schrift Leipzig 1919
- Alte und neue Gedichte Leipzig 1920
- Entpersönlichung Leipzig 1921
- Michael Bakunin und die Anarchie Leipzig 1923
- Stein Wien / Leipzig 1925
- Teufeleien und andere Erzählungen Haessel, Leipzig 1924
- Graf Mark und die Prinzessin von Nassau-Usingen’’ Leipzig 1924
- Der wiederkehrende Christus. Eine groteske Erzählung Leipzig 1926
- Im alten Reich. Lebensbilder deutscher Städte (3 Volumes: Der Norden/Die Mitte des Reiches/Der Süden) 1927
- Neue Städtebilder Im alten Reich’’ Leipzig 1929
- Gesammelte Gedichte 1929
- Lebensbilder mecklenburgischer Städte 1930/1931
- Die Hugenottin Bern 1932
- Alte und neue Götter (1848) Die Revolution des 19. Jahrhunderts in Deutschland Berlin und Zürich 1930 (later as: 1848 Die Revolution des 19. Jahrhunderts in Deutschland 1948)
- Deutsche Geschichte 1934–49
- Römisches Reich Deutscher Nation Berlin 1934
- Das Zeitalter der Glaubensspaltung Zürich 1937
- Untergang des Römischen Reiches Deutscher Nation Zürich 1949
- Frühling in der Schweiz Zürich 1938
- Weiße Nächte Zürich 1943
- Herbstfeuer Insel, Leipzig 1944 (Autumn Fire, transl. Timothy Adès, introduction by Karen Leeder; Poetry Salzburg, 2024).
- Mein Tagebuch Weimar 1946
- Urphänomene Zürich 1946
- Der falsche Großvater Insel, Wiesbaden 1947
- Der lautlose Aufstand. Bericht über die Widerstandsbewegung des deutschen Volkes 1933 - 1945 Edited by Günther Weisenborn, Rowohlt Verlag, Hamburg 1953
