= Friedrich Gerstäcker =

German traveler and novelist

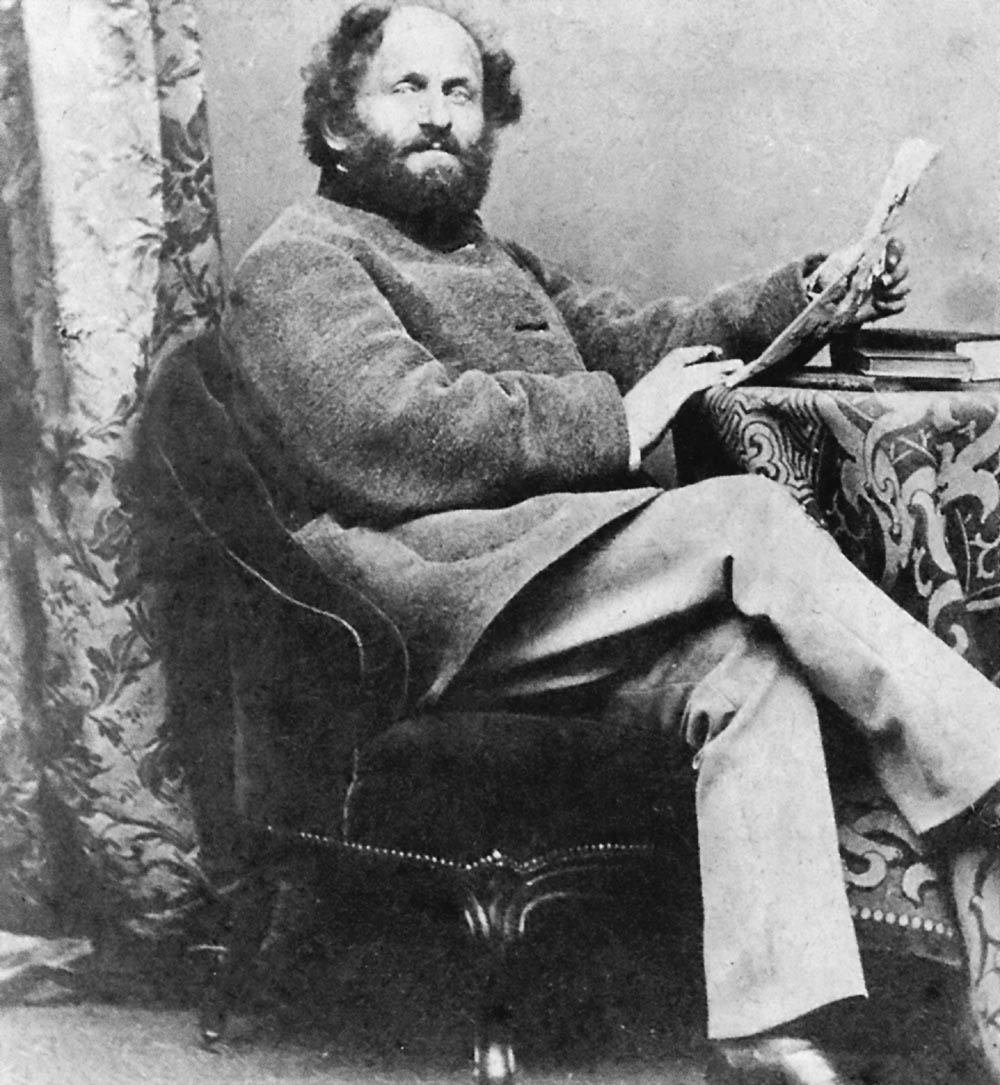
Friedrich Gerstäcker

Friedrich Gerstäcker (May 10, 1816 in Hamburg – May 31, 1872 in Braunschweig) was a German traveler, novelist, and adventurer.

== Biography ==
He was the son of Friedrich Gerstäcker (1790–1825), a celebrated opera singer. After being apprenticed to a commercial house, he learned farming in Saxony. In 1837, however, not yet 21 and with a yen for adventure instilled from reading Robinson Crusoe, he went to America and wandered over a large part of the United States, supporting himself by whatever work came to hand. He became fireman on a steamboat, deck hand, farmer, silversmith, and merchant. After wandering through most of the United States, spending some time as a hunter and trapper in the Indian Territory, and in 1842 keeping a hotel at Point Coupée, Louisiana, he returned to Germany six adventurous years later in 1843.

To his great surprise, he found himself famous as an author. His mother had shown his diary, which he regularly sent home, and which contained descriptions of his adventures in the New World, to the editor of the Rosen, who published them in that periodical. These sketches having found favour with the public, Gerstäcker issued them in 1844 under the title Streif- und Jagdzüge durch die Vereinigten Staaten von Nordamerika. In 1845 his first novel, Die Regulatoren in Arkansas, appeared marking the start of a successful writing career. Henceforth the stream of his productiveness flowed on uninterrupted.

From 1849 to 1852 Gerstäcker travelled round the world, visiting North and South America, Polynesia and Australia. He experienced the California gold rush, crossed the South Pacific on a whaler, and wandered through Australia and experienced a "gold rush" there. On his return to Germany, he settled in Leipzig.

In 1860 he again went to South America, chiefly with a view to inspecting the German colonies there and reporting on the possibility of diverting the stream of German emigration in this direction. The result of his observations and experiences he recorded in Achtzehn Monate in Südamerika (1862). In 1862 he accompanied Duke Ernest of Saxe-Coburg-Gotha to Egypt and Abyssinia, and on his return settled at Coburg, where he wrote a number of novels descriptive of the scenes he had visited.

In 1867–1868 Gerstäcker again undertook a long journey, visiting North America, Venezuela and the West Indies. He visited Mexico right after the collapse of the Second Mexican Empire, a situation about which he wrote a few passages in one of his books. On his return, he lived first at Dresden and then at Brunswick. While preparing for a journey to India, China and Japan, he suffered a fatal cerebral haemorrhage on May 31, 1872.

The widely traveled adventurer left an oeuvre of 44 volumes, which he edited himself for his Jena publisher H. Costenoble. His stories and novels inspired numerous imitators: Karl May profited from him and used landscape descriptions as well as subjects and characters. Even theatre and movie companies borrowed from his work: the critic George Jean Nathan credits the plot of the musical Brigadoon (1954) to Gerstäcker's short story Germelshausen, though this was denied by Lerner, the author of Brigadoon.

The Friedrich-Gerstäcker-Gesellschaft e.V. (Fr. G. society) founded in 1978 in Braunschweig offers more information about Gerstäcker and runs a museum about his work.

== Legacy and prizes ==
In 1947 the city of Braunschweig, Germany, founded the Friedrich Gerstäcker Prize, the oldest German prize for young adult literature. The prize is awarded bi-annually "to recognize linguistically sophisticated works that promote to young adults tolerance, cosmpolitanism, and openness towards the traditions, beliefs, and values of other cultures."

In 1957 Gerstäcker was made an honorary citizen of Arkansas.

In 1986 then governor of Arkansas, Bill Clinton, declared 10 May, Friedrich Gerstäcker's birthday, as "Friedrich Gerstäcker Day".

== Works (selection) ==
- Streif- und Jagdzüge durch die Vereinigten Staaten von Nordamerika (Rambling and Hunting in the United States of North America), 1844.
- Die Regulatoren in Arkansas (The Arkansas Regulators), 1845.
- Der deutschen Auswanderer Fahrten und Schicksale (Travels and Fates of the German Emigrants). Leipzig 1846.
- Mississippi-Bilder (Mississippi Images). 3 volumes, Leipzig 1847.
- Die Flußpiraten des Mississippi (The Pirates of the Mississippi). 3 volumes, Leipzig 1848.
- Gold. Ein californisches Lebensbild aus dem Jahre 1849 (Gold. An Image of Californian Life from the year 1848). 3 volumes, Jena 1858.
- Neue Reisen in Nordamerika, Mexiko, Ecuador, Westindien und Venezuela (New Travels in North America, Mexico, Ecuador, the West Indies, and Venezuela). 3 Volumes, Jena 1868.
- Black & White; In the Red River Swamps. Bilingual edition, translated and edited by Mark Gruettner and Robert Bareikis, Tintamarre, Shreveport 2006, ISBN 0-9754244-3-2.

== Secondary literature ==
- Couch, Richard Allen: Friedrich Gerstäcker's novels of the American frontier. Dissertation, University of Iowa, Iowa City 1999 / UMI, Ann Arbor, MI 2000.
- Ostwald, Thomas: Friedrich Gerstäcker: Leben und Werk; Biographie eines Ruhelosen. Friedrich-Gerstäcker-Gesellschaft / Edition Corsar, Braunschweig 2007 (408 pp.), ISBN 3-925320-09-1 (major biography, in German language; the title translates: F. G.: Life and Work[s]; Biography of a restless one.).
- Sammons, Jeffrey L.: Ideology, nemesis, fantasy: Charles Sealsfield, Friedrich Gerstäcker, Karl May, and other German novelists of America. University of North Carolina Press, Chapel Hill 1998, ISBN 0-8078-8121-X.
- Woodson, Lerry Henry: American Negro Slavery in the works of Friederich Strubberg, Friedrich Gerstäcker and Otto Ruppers: A dissertation etc. Catholic University of America Press, Washington 1949.
- Zangerl, Anton: Friedrich Gerstäcker (1816–1872), Romane und Erzählungen: Struktur und Gehalt. Peter Lang: Bern 1999, ISBN 3-906762-76-9 (dissertation, in German; the title translates: F.G., novels and stories: structure and contents).
