= The NeverEnding Story (film series) =

1984–1994 fantasy film series

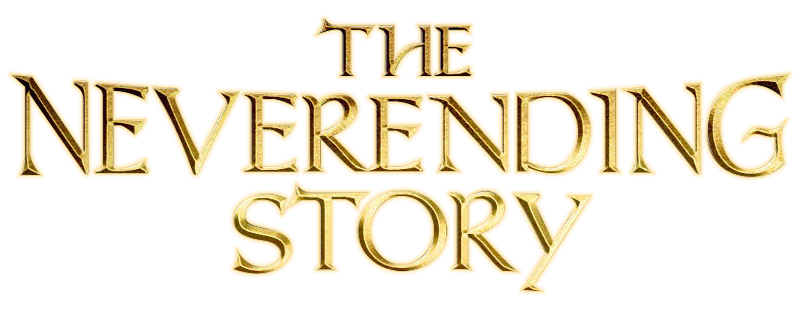
- Directed by: Wolfgang Petersen (1); George T. Miller (2); Peter Macdonald (3)
- Based on: The Neverending Story by Michael Ende
- Produced by: Bernd Eichinger (1); Dieter Geissler (1–3); Tim Hampton (3)
- Production companies: Producers Sales Organization; Neue Constantin Film (1); CineVox (2-3)
- Distributed by: West Germany: Neue Constantin Film (1); Warner Bros. (2-3); United States: Warner Bros. (1–2) Miramax Films (3)
- Running time: 279 minutes
- Countries: West Germany; United States
- Language: English

The NeverEnding Story (German: Die unendliche Geschichte) is a West German/American-produced English language epic fantasy film series based on the 1979 novel of the same name by Michael Ende.

The original 1984 film, The NeverEnding Story, was directed and co-written by Wolfgang Petersen and was later followed by two sequels.

The first film adapted the first half of the original novel, while the second half of the novel was used as the rough basis for the second film, The NeverEnding Story II: The Next Chapter.

The third film in the series, The NeverEnding Story III, has an original plot.

== Films ==
Film	U.S. release date	Director(s)	Screenwriter(s)	Story by	Producer(s)
The NeverEnding Story	July 20, 1984	Wolfgang Petersen	Wolfgang Petersen and Herman Weigel	Wolfgang Petersen and Herman Weigel	Bernd Eichinger and Dieter Geissler
The NeverEnding Story II: The Next Chapter	February 8, 1991	George T. Miller	Karin Howard	Karin Howard	Dieter Geissler
The NeverEnding Story III	April 2, 1996	Peter MacDonald	Jeff Lieberman	Karin Howard	Heinz Bibo, Dieter Geissler, Tim Hampton, Klaus Kaehler, Harry Nap and Harold Lee Tichenor

== Cast and crew ==
List indicators

This section includes characters who will appear or have appeared in more than two films in the series.

- An empty grey cell indicates the character was not in the film, or that the character's official presence has not yet been confirmed.
- ^{A} indicates an appearance through archival footage or audio.
- ^{U} indicates an uncredited appearance.
- ^{V} indicates a voice-only role.
- ^{Y} indicates a younger version of the character.

=== Principal cast ===
Character	The NeverEnding Story	The NeverEnding Story II: The Next Chapter	The NeverEnding Story III
Character	1984	1990	1994
Bastian Balthazar Bux	Barret Oliver	Jonathan Brandis J. Michael Haney^{Y}	Jason James Richter
Atreyu	Noah Hathaway	Kenny Morrison Noah Hathaway^{A}^{U}	
Carl Conrad Coreander	Thomas Hill	Thomas Hill	Freddie Jones
The Childlike Empress	Tami Stronach	Alexandra Johnes	Julie Cox
Engywook	Sydney Bromley		Tony Robinson
Urgl	Patricia Hayes		Moya Brady
Falkor the Luckdragon	Alan Oppenheimer^{V}	Donald Arthur^{V}	William Hootkins^{V}
Mr. Rockbiter Sr.	Alan Oppenheimer^{V}	Dan Fincher^{V}	Frederick Warder^{V}
Gmork	Alan Oppenheimer^{V}		
Barney Bux	Gerald McRaney	John Wesley Shipp	Kevin McNulty
Cairon	Moses Gunn		
Teeny Weeny	Deep Roy		
Night Hob	Tilo Prückner		
Ethan	Darryl Cooksey		
Todd	Drum Garrett		
Lucas	Nicholas Gilbert		
Morla	Robert Easton^{V}^{U}		
Mr. Rockbiter Jr.		Colin Gilder^{V}	David Forman^{V}
Xayide		Clarissa Burt	
Nimbly		Martin Umbach	
Tri-Face		Christopher Burton	
Mrs. Bux		Helena Michell	
Nicole Baxter			Melody Kay
Slip			Jack Black
Jane Bux			Tracey Ellis
Mrs. Rockbiter			Mac McDonald^{V}
Bark Troll			William Hootkins^{V}
The Janitor			Mark Acheson
Dog			Ryan Bollman
Mookie			Carole Finn
Coil			Nicole Parker
Rage			Adrien Dorval

=== Additional crew and production details ===
Film/Television	Crew/detail					
Film/Television	Composer(s)	Cinematographer(s)	Editor(s)	Production companies	Distributing company	Running time
The NeverEnding Story	Klaus Doldinger and Giorgio Moroder	Jost Vacano	Jane Seitz	Neue Constantin Film, Bavaria Film, and Producers Sales Organization	Warner Bros. Pictures	94 minutes
The NeverEnding Story II: The Next Chapter	Robert Folk	David Connell	Chris Blunden and Peter Hollywood	CineVox Filmproduktion	Warner Bros. Pictures	90 minutes
The NeverEnding Story III	Peter Wolf	Robin Vidgeon	Michael Bradsell and Jim Roddan	CineVox Filmproduktion	Miramax Films	95 minutes

== Reception ==
=== Critical and public response ===
Film	Rotten Tomatoes	Metacritic
The NeverEnding Story	81% (42 reviews)	46 (10 reviews)
The NeverEnding Story II: The Next Chapter	14% (7 reviews)	30 (13 reviews)
The NeverEnding Story III	25% (3 reviews)	—N/a
