= The Neverending Story =

1979 fantasy novel by Michael Ende and its franchise

- First edition (German)
- Author: Michael Ende
- Original title: Die unendliche Geschichte
- Translator: Ralph Manheim
- Illustrator: Roswitha Quadflieg
- Language: German
- Genre: Fantasy
- Publisher: Thienemann Verlag
- Publication date: September 1, 1979
- Publication place: West Germany
- Media type: Print
- Pages: 400
- ISBN: 3-522-12800-1
- OCLC: 7460007
- LC Class: PT2665.N27 U5

The Neverending Story (German: Die unendliche Geschichte) is a fantasy novel by German writer Michael Ende, published in 1979. The first English translation, by Ralph Manheim, was published in 1983. It was later adapted into a film series and a television series.

== Plot ==
Bastian Balthazar Bux is an imaginative boy dealing with his mother's death and his father's neglect. While escaping bullies, he hides in the bookstore of Carl Conrad Coreander. There, he finds The Neverending Story and steals it. He hides in his school's attic and reads it.

The book is set in the magical land of Fantastica, which is threatened by a formless entity known as the "Nothing". A delegation seeks the aid of the realm's ruler, the Childlike Empress, but her physician reveals she is ill and has chosen a boy warrior named Atreyu to find a cure. Atreyu receives the powerful amulet AURYN, which grants protection. Following advice from the giant turtle Morla the Aged One, he seeks an invisible oracle, Uyulala. Along the way, he rescues the luckdragon Falkor from the shapeshifter Ygramul the Many. Uyulala reveals the Empress can be cured if she is given a new name given by a human from beyond Fantastica's borders.

Bastian grows concerned that the characters can sense his presence, and can hear or even see him at points. As Falkor and Atreyu search for the border, they are separated by the four Wind Giants. Atreyu loses AURYN and lands in the ruins of Spook City. He encounters the dying werewolf Gmork, a servant of the force behind the Nothing. Gmork explains that the city's residents have leapt voluntarily into the Nothing, becoming lies in the human world. He was sent to stop the chosen hero but was imprisoned by the city's princess. Atreyu declares himself the hero, and Gmork dies laughing. In his death throes, his jaws clamp onto Atreyu's leg as the Nothing approaches; Falkor retrieves AURYN and saves Atreyu.

The pair reach the Childlike Empress, who reveals they have brought her rescuer. Bastian suspects the Empress means him but is incredulous. When he refuses to name her, the Empress consults the Old Man of Wandering Mountain, who owns his own copy of The Neverending Story. As the Old Man reads aloud, Bastian's book loops back to the beginning. Realizing the story will repeat endlessly without his intervention, Bastian names the Empress "Moon Child" and is transported to Fantastica, where his imagination restores the land. The Empress gives him AURYN, with the inscription "Do What You Wish" on the back.

Each wish costs Bastian a memory of his human life. Unaware of this at first, Bastian wishes for several adventures in Fantastica. In spite of warnings, Bastian uses AURYN to create dangers for himself to conquer, causing chaos for Fantastica, such as a dragon attack and the birth of the winged Shlamoofs. Manipulated by the wicked sorceress Xayide, and with the Empress absent, Bastian decides to take over Fantastica as emperor. Atreyu battles Bastian and the Ivory Tower is destroyed. Bastian enters "The City of Old Emperors", inhabited by humans who came to Fantastica but lost their way back. A repentant Bastian is reduced to two memories: his father and his own name. Bastian must give up the memory of his father to discover that his strongest wish is to be capable of love.

After much searching and having lost his name and sense of self, Bastian is unable to find the Water of Life with which to leave Fantastica with his memories. He is rescued from the Shlamoofs by Atreyu and Falkor, and he lays down AURYN at Atreyu's feet. Atreyu and Falkor enter AURYN with him, where the Water of Life questions Bastian's name and whether Bastian has finished all the stories he began. Atreyu gives Bastian's name and promises to complete the stories. The Water of Life allows Bastian to return to the human world, along with some of the mystical waters. After drinking the Water of Life, Bastian returns to his original form and reunites with his father, recounting his adventures and repairing their bond. Afterward, Bastian confesses his theft to Coreander, who denies ever owning the book and reveals he has also been to Fantastica. Coreander explains that the book has moved to new hands and Bastian, as he did, will eventually show people the many ways of Fantastica.

== Editions ==
The Neverending Story was first published under the title Die unendliche Geschichte in 1979 by West German publisher Thienemann Verlag. It was number one on West Germany's Der Spiegel bestseller list for 113 weeks, and remained on the list for 332 weeks. The original edition was printed using red and green text: red writing to represent the story lines which take place in the human world, and green writing to represent the events taking place in Fantastica. The illustrations by Roswitha Quadflieg that begin each chapter are drawn in both colors to illustrate how the two worlds intertwine. It was initially only printed as a hardcover, not paperback, because Ende wanted the book to look as much as possible like the book that Bastian steals from Mr. Coreander in the story.

The English version, translated by Ralph Manheim, was published simultaneously in the United Kingdom and United States in 1983. Several other English-language editions have since been published, with a variety of covers and lettering styles. As of 2010, The Neverending Story has been translated into 36 languages, and sold more than eight million copies worldwide.

In 1998 Der Niemandsgarten (English: The No Man's Garden) was published. This anthology of Michael Ende's unpublished works includes insight on the creation of The Neverending Story and has been translated into Japanese but not English. Also unavailable in English is Aber das ist eine andere Geschichte – Das große Michael Ende Lesebuch (English: But that is Another Story: The Big Michael Ende Reader), which contains the previously unpublished chapter "Bastian erlernt die Zauberkunst" (English: "Bastian learns the art of magic").

== Reception ==
A survey conducted by German filmmaker Ulli Pfau found that The Neverending Story appeals particularly to readers aged 18–35. It remains most successful in Germany and Japan, while the 1984 film tends to be better-known among English-speaking audiences.

Early reviews of the English-language edition included positive reviews in Library Journal and Kirkus Reviews, the latter calling The Neverending Story an "appealing, delicately wrought, engrossing adventure—for children of all ages". A less positive review in gaming magazine White Dwarf took issue with the appearance of the physical book, writing that "despite plush production the artwork is grotty, while the promised 'shimmering copper-coloured silk' binding looks like plain red cloth to me. A good buy, though, unless you suffer from red/green colour blindness".

In subsequent years the text of The Neverending Story has been analyzed from several different viewpoints. In The Rhetoric of Character in Children's Literature, literary critic Maria Nikolajeva states that "the two parts of the novel repeat each other" in that Bastian becomes a hero but then in the second half he "acts not even as an antihero but as a false hero of the fairy tale" and the characters of Bastian and Atreyu can also be seen as mirror halves. Helmut Gronemann's Fantastica—the Realm of the Unconscious explores the novel from a Jungian point of view, identifying archetypes and symbols in the story. Additionally, some religious groups have analyzed the text for occult messages and imagery.

== Adaptations and derivative works ==
=== Audiobook ===
A German dramatized audioplay was made in 1984 under the title Die unendliche Geschichte, published by Karussell/Universal Music Group. Directed by Anke Beckert, with music by Frank Duval, it was released on 3 parts on LP and MC, and 2 parts on CD.

=== Film ===
The NeverEnding Story was the first film adaptation of the novel. It was released in 1984, directed by Wolfgang Petersen and starring Barret Oliver as Bastian, Noah Hathaway as Atreyu, and Tami Stronach as the Childlike Empress. It covers only the first half of the book, ending at the point where Bastian enters Fantasia, (Note: While the English translation of the book names the land as 'Fantastica', the 1984 West Germany/United States film uses the name 'Fantasia' for it, which is closer to the original Phantásien. Other movies, TV shows and video games in English continued to use 'Fantasia' as its name.) and features characters who look markedly different from how they are described in the book (most notably Bastian, who is very self-conscious about his weight in the book, but is depicted as slender in the film). Ende, who was reportedly "revolted" by the film, requested they halt production or change the film's name, as he felt it had ultimately and drastically deviated from his novel; when they did neither, he sued them and subsequently lost the case.

The NeverEnding Story II: The Next Chapter, directed by George T. Miller and starring Jonathan Brandis and Kenny Morrison, was released in 1990. It used plot elements primarily from the second half of Ende's novel, but told a new tale. Ende has dismissed both the 1984 film and its 1990 sequel as "gigantic melodrama made of kitsch and commerce, plush and plastic".

The NeverEnding Story III, directed by Peter MacDonald and starring Jason James Richter, Melody Kay and Jack Black, was released in 1994 in Germany. This film was primarily based only upon the characters from Ende's book but had an original story. The film was lambasted by film critics for its poor and laughable dialogue and special effects and was a box-office bomb. In addition, the US release went straight to video and received a limited theatrical run in 1996.

In 2024, Michael Ende Productions, in association with See-Saw Films, announced plans for a series of films based on the book.

=== Novels ===
From 2003 to 2004, the German publishing house AVAinternational published six novels of different authors in a series called Legends of Fantastica, each using parts of the original plot and characters to compose an entirely new storyline:

- Kinkel, Tanja (2003). Der König der Narren [The King of Fools].
- Schweikert, Ulrike (2003). Die Seele der Nacht [The Soul of the Night].
- Isau, Ralf (2003). Die geheime Bibliothek des Thaddäus Tillmann Trutz [The Secret Library of Thaddaeus Tillman Trutz].
- Fleischhauer, Wolfram (2004). Die Verschwörung der Engel [The Angels' Plot].
- Freund, Peter (2004). Die Stadt der vergessenen Träume [The City of Forgotten Dreams].
- Dempf, Peter (2004). Die Herrin der Wörter [Empress of the Words].

=== Stage ===
The world première of the stage production took place in 2012 in Brisbane, Australia, by the Harvest Rain Theatre Company.

In Germany, The Neverending Story has been variously adapted to a stage play, ballet and opera, which premiered both at Trier and at Weimar Nationaltheater on 10 April 2004, and was subsequently staged at Linz Landestheater on 11 December. The scores to both the opera and the ballet versions were composed by Siegfried Matthus. The opera libretto was by Anton Perry.

In Canada, the novel was adapted to stage for the Stratford Festival for the 2019 season adapted by David S. Craig with original music by Hawksley Workman.

In Spain, in October 2022, the musical of The Neverending Story premiered in Madrid, in Teatro Calderón. The music was composed by Iván Macias and the book was adapted by Felix Amador, while Federico Barrios was the director. Bastian and Atreyu roles were played by children that alternate. Teresa Abarca and Alba Cuartero alternate the Childlike Empress. Josean Moreno was Fujur, Teresa Ferrer was Xayide and Álex Forriols was Gmork. The company KREAT K made for the musical some animatronics of the fantastic creatures. The musical did the last show in Madrid on May 28, 2023. On September 8, the musical came to Teatro principal in Zaragoza, and lasted until October 22. Later on November 2, the musical premiered in Barcelona in Teatre Apolo with Elena González as Childlike Empress, Josean Moreno as Fujur, Álex Forriols as Gmork and Noemí Gallego as Xayide. The last show in Barcelona was on April 7, 2024. Between December 18, 2025 and January 4, 2026, the musical returned in FIBES, Seville.

=== Television ===
The 1995 animated series was produced by Canadian animation studio Nelvana, under the title of The Neverending Story: The Animated Adventures of Bastian Balthazar Bux. The animated series ran for two years, and had a total of twenty-six episodes. Director duties were split between Marc Boreal and Mike Fallows. Each episode focused on Bastian's further adventures in Fantastica, largely different from his further adventures in the book, but occasionally containing elements of them.

Tales from the Neverending Story, a one-season-only TV series that is loosely based on Ende's novel, was produced in Montreal, Quebec, Canada, through December 2000 to August 2002 and distributed by Muse Entertainment, airing on HBO in 2002. It was aired as four two-hour television movies in the US and as a TV series of 13 one-hour episodes in the United Kingdom. The series was released on DVD in 2001.

=== Video games ===
Ocean Software released a text adventure in 1985 for the ZX Spectrum, Amstrad CPC, Commodore 64, and Atari 8-bit computers.

A video game based on the second film was released in 1990 by Merimpex Ltd under their Linel label and re-released by System 4 for the ZX Spectrum and Commodore 64.

The Ende-inspired video game AURYN Quest was released in 2002.
