= List of The Neverending Story characters =

The following is a list of characters in the 1979 novel The Neverending Story by Michael Ende and its film and television adaptations.

== Bastian Balthazar Bux ==
Bastian Balthazar Bux
- First appearance: The Neverending Story
- Created by: Michael Ende
- Portrayed by: Barret Oliver (1st film); Jonathan Brandis (2nd film); Jason James Richter (3rd film); Christopher Bell (animated series); Mark Rendall (TV series)

In-universe information
- Species: Human
- Gender: Male

Bastian Balthazar Bux is described as a lonely boy, about 10 or 12 years old, who is raised by his father and still mourning the sudden death of his mother from an unspecified illness. He is considered a dreamer, who is shunned by other children due to his immense imagination. During a visit to an antique bookstore, he steals a curious-looking book titled The Neverending Story, and upon reading it finds himself drawn into the story. Halfway through the book, Bastian becomes a character in The Neverending Story, in a world called Fantastica (also called "Fantasia" in the films).

As the story progresses, Bastian slowly loses his memories of the real world as his wishes carry him throughout Fantastica and change him into a different person. Deluded by the witch Xayide, Bastian moves to the Ivory Tower and tries to have himself proclaimed Emperor. The ceremony is interrupted by Atreyu, who is nearly killed by Bastian. Eventually, Bastian realizes that he is beginning to lose himself, and starts a desperate quest for his one true desire. In the end, he forgets his name. With the help of Falkor and Atreyu, he manages to return to the human world with the capability of loving, and brings the Water of Life to his father, curing him of his melancholy. Bastian and Coreander exchange tales of their adventures in Fantastica, and Coreander reveals that a person can return to Fantastica as many times as they can think of new names for the benevolent Childlike Empress.

In the Hallmark miniseries Tales from the Neverending Story, it is mentioned to Xayide, by the Great Turtle (Morla), that Bastian is not the only chosen one. The identity of the other child remains unclear throughout the remainder of the series, until Bastian is tricked upon rereading a chapter (after Xayide had caused her own demise by reading from the book) by his classmate Fallon, with whom he had started to bond. Thus, he finds out that Fallon is the other "Chosen One", albeit for darkness.

Bastian has been portrayed by five different actors:

- 1984: Barret Oliver in The NeverEnding Story
- 1990: Jonathan Brandis in The NeverEnding Story II: The Next Chapter (J. Michael Haney, Jr. as Young Bastian)
- 1994: Jason James Richter in The NeverEnding Story III
- 1995: Christopher Bell provided the voice of the character in The Neverending Story animated series
- 2001: Mark Rendall in Tales from the Neverending Story

== Atreyu ==
Atreyu
- First appearance: The Neverending Story
- Created by: Michael Ende
- Portrayed by: Noah Hathaway (1st film); Kenny Morrison (2nd film); Dominic Zamprogna (animated series); Tyler Hynes (TV series)

In-universe information
- Species: Greenskin warrior
- Gender: Male

Atreyu (German spelling: Atréju) is the protagonist of the mysterious book that Bastian reads. He is a young green-skinned warrior from the Grassy Plain. His parents were killed by a Purple Buffalo soon after he was born, and his entire village raised him. His name means "son of all" in his native language. He is summoned by the Childlike Empress to save the land of Fantasia by finding a cure for her illness and given Auryn, an amulet that makes whoever wears it the Childlike Empress' herald. During the quest to find a cure, he meets Falkor the luckdragon, who becomes his steed after the death of his horse Artax.

Bastian, reading Atreyu's story in the real world, experiences everything Atreyu does; this proves Fantasia's solution and the Empress' cure, in bringing Bastian to Fantasia to give the Empress a new name. Atreyu plays a prominent role in the second half of the novel, as Bastian travels Fantasia far and wide as its savior. They quickly become friends, but as Bastian continues to use Auryn, he becomes arrogant and gradually loses his memories. When Bastian has lost even his name, Atreyu and Falkor offer favorable testimony to the powers in Auryn, who allow Bastian's return to the human world. With their friendship restored, Atreyu promises to finish the stories Bastian has begun in Fantasia.

In the 1984 film The Neverending Story, the character of Atreyu is played by Noah Hathaway. His skin is ultimately not olive green as described in the novel; though it was attempted to do this through makeup, it never made it to the final production. As such, his people were ultimately called the Plains People instead of Greenskins. The character returns in The NeverEnding Story II: The Next Chapter, played by Kenny Morrison. In the 1995 animated show The Neverending Story, Atreyu (voiced by Dominic Zamprogna) has a younger sister named Saiya (voiced by Ashley Taylor Tickell) and his outward appearance has been patterned after Noah Hathaway from the first film, although this version has green skin like his novel version. In the 2001 Hallmark Channel miniseries, Tales from the Neverending Story, he is portrayed by Tyler Hynes and the character's people are called the Woodland People. He is shown to have a romantic relationship with a young aviator called "Fly Girl", and to be something of a village innocent.

== Carl Conrad Coreander ==
Carl Conrad Coreander
- First appearance: The Neverending Story
- Created by: Michael Ende
- Portrayed by: Thomas Hill (1st and 2nd film); Freddie Jones (3rd film); Chris Wiggins (animated series); John Dunn-Hill (TV series)

In-universe information
- Species: Human
- Gender: Male
- Occupation: Book shop owner

Carl Conrad Coreander (German spelling: Karl Konrad Koreander) is a cantankerous bookseller; Bastian finds and steals The Neverending Story from his store. The novel states that Mr. Coreander is one of the few humans who has been to Fantasia and returned. He and Bastian come to a better understanding and share stories of their adventures with each other.

Coreander is portrayed by Thomas Hill in the first film, and was the only actor who reprised his role in the second film; in the third film, he is played by Freddie Jones. In the cartoon series, Coreander is voiced by Chris Wiggins. In the 2001 television series, Tales from the Neverending Story, portrayed by John Dunn-Hill, he functions in a double role as a wizard in Fantasia wherein he is called "the Curiosity". In the third film, his wife Mrs. Coreander appears, portrayed by Shirley Broderick.

== Childlike Empress ==
Childlike Empress
- First appearance: The Neverending Story
- Created by: Michael Ende
- Portrayed by: Tami Stronach (1st film); Alexandra Johnes (2nd film); Julie Cox (3rd film); Lisa Yamanaka (animated series); Audrey Gardiner (TV series)

In-universe information
- Aliases: Moon Child, Golden-Eyed Commander of Wishes
- Species: Fantasian
- Gender: Female
- Occupation: Goddess of Fantasy

Childlike Empress (German: Kindliche Kaiserin) is the monarch of Fantasia, who resides in the capitol called the Ivory Tower (German: der Elfenbeinturm) in the heart of the realm. Although she is nominally the ruler of Fantasia, she rarely interacts with the outside world. Should she die, Fantasia and all Fantasians would cease to exist. The amulet known as Auryn is her emblem, and those who wear it are her representatives. As explained by Morla the Aged One, her lifetime is not measured in years, but by names, which only the imagination of a human child can give her. When she begins to need a new name, she begins to fade away, causing the Nothing to appear in Fantasia. She sends Atreyu on the Great Quest, which brings Bastian to Fantasia, and Bastian gives her the name of Moon Child, which restores Fantasia.

The Empress' description is that of an indescribably beautiful young girl, appearing no older than ten, yet much older than the oldest Fantasians. Her hair is snow-white, as is her gown, and her eyes are the color of gold, earning her the title Golden-Eyed Commander of Wishes.

The role was portrayed by Tami Stronach in Wolfgang Petersen's 1984 adaptation, by Alexandra Johnes in The NeverEnding Story II: The Next Chapter (1990) and by Julie Cox (apparently as an adolescent) in The NeverEnding Story III (1994). In the films, her hair is dark, rather than white.

In the 1995 cartoon series, the Childlike Empress has golden hair, wears a green gown, and is voiced by Lisa Yamanaka. The episode "Missing Memories" reveals that the Empress is essentially the equivalent of the Fisher King to Fantasia; when Xayide finds crystals representing the Empress's memories in the Minroud Mine, shattering these crystals not only removes the Empress's memory of the subject depicted, but erases them from Fantasia itself. After Bastian drives Xayide out of the Mine before she can shatter the Empress's memory of him, he restores the Empress's memories by telling her of his own memories of Fantasia.

In the 2001 television series Tales from the Neverending Story, the Empress, again depicted with dark hair, was played by Audrey Gardiner. In the series, she is a sister to Xayide, a ruler of Dark City.

== The Nothing ==
The Nothing is a supernatural force that appears in the novel The Neverending Story and its adaptations. The Nothing is described as a formless entity that is composed of real-world human negative emotions, such as disillusionment, disbelief, and humans' lack of imagination. As a result, the entity negates the existence of things and people in Fantasia. While the novel describes it as a formless being, the film adaptation depicts it as a raging storm, but the filmmakers explained that the Nothing is actually an invisible force, and the storm is a consequence of its presence, like the mist that surrounds the Nothing in the book. The Nothing employs its servant, Gmork, to kill the boy who searches for the cure for the Childlike Empress. The Nothing engulfs Fantasia, but after Bastian gives the Childlike Empress a new name, the Nothing is dispelled, and the land is recreated.

In the 1995 animated series, the Nothing is combined with Gmork and is depicted as a black hole with evil red eyes.

In the 2001 live-action TV series, Tales from the Neverending Story, the Nothing appears as a weapon in the chest that is used by the sorceress Xayide, who uses it to erase places in Fantasia, and transform its people into brainwashed Drones.

== Engywook and Urgl ==
Engywook and Urgl
- First appearance: The Neverending Story
- Created by: Michael Ende
- Portrayed by: Engywook: Sydney Bromley (1st film); Tony Robinson (3rd film); Wayne Robson (animated series); Urgl: Patricia Hayes (1st film); Moya Brady (3rd film); Barbara Bryne (animated series)

In-universe information
- Species: Gnomes
- Occupation: Engywook: Researcher of the Southern Oracle; Urgl: Housewife

Engywook (German: Engywuck) and his wife Urgl are a quarrelsome pair of gnomes who live close to the Southern Oracle. Engywook is a research scientist who has studied the Southern Oracle and her three gates for most of his life but has never entered any. His wife Urgl often gets in his way while brewing potions in a large cauldron for healing wounded people. Engywook can observe the Riddle Gate, also known as the Sphinxes, from his telescope on a hilltop overlooking the first gate. In the book, Urgl removes poison from Atreyu and Engywook instructs him about the three gates that lead to the Southern Oracle. This scene is portrayed in the 1984 film.

In the first film, Engywook is played by Sydney Bromley and Urgl is played by Patricia Hayes.

In the third film of the series, Engywook (played by Tony Robinson) and Urgl (played by Moya Brady) have moved to a forest and still argue continuously. The house is stepped on by Bastian during his return trip to Fantasia, although it is then completely destroyed by the Nasties. The two go with Bastian, Falkor, and Bark Troll to find the Empress for help, but are stranded on Earth and arrive in Alaska, where they mail themselves to the others and return home, their house rebuilt.

In the 1995 cartoon series, Engywook and Urgl are voiced by Wayne Robson and Barbara Bryne.

== Falkor ==
Falkor
- First appearance: The Neverending Story
- Created by: Michael Ende
- Portrayed by: Alan Oppenheimer (1st film); Donald Arthur (2nd film); William Hootkins (3rd film); Howard Jerome (animated series)

In-universe information
- Species: Luck Dragon
- Gender: Male

Falkor (German: Fuchur) is a companion of Atreyu and Bastian. He is the only luckdragon (German: Glücksdrache) to appear, although five others are mentioned in passing. He helps Atreyu find a cure for the Empress after escaping the web of Ygramul the Many. Personality-wise, Falkor is optimistic, friendly, dignified, helpful, and wise, trying to help Bastian remember to "never give up and good luck will find you".

Falkor appears much like a Chinese dragon but whereas on the cover of the book, Dan Craig illustrated Falkor as lion-like; in the 1984 film adaptation of the novel, Falkor is dog-like with white fur, pearly white scales that glitter pink, ruby-colored eyes, and is pleased by affectionate scratchings behind his ear. Luckdragons possess neither immense physical strength nor great magical talents, though they can exhale blue fire. Their only distinctive ability is incredible luck in everything they do, as shown when Falkor locates and rescues his companion after being lost in a violent, blinding storm. Luckdragons never stop drawing air and heat through their scales, which makes eating unnecessary and makes submersion in water deadly to them. Luckdragons are capable of sleeping while flying and prefer to occupy as much open space as possible.

Falkor is a sophisticated being from Fantasia, giving advice to people when they have lost hope in many things they set out to do whether in a quest for what they seek or in some cases people and beings have given up altogether and lost faith. Mostly during the Nothing's destruction of Fantasia, he helps Atreyu along the way of his quest to stop The Nothing. Falkor's attitude purely comes from his heart, and his openness to making friends means a lot to everyone he encounters, into which Falkor in return treasures every friendship he has. Falkor only makes enemies of those who threaten his friends or Fantasia.

The only thing in Fantasia known to have been hostile to Falkor is Gmork. He does not like to be alone, preferring close company with friends he knows will not betray his open heart. He watches and shelters the injured, as he did Atreyu after rescuing him from the Swamps of Sadness.

In the first film, Falkor is voiced by Alan Oppenheimer. In the second, he is voiced by an uncredited Donald Arthur. In the third film, he is portrayed by Gord Robertson and voiced by William Hootkins.

In the cartoon series, Falkor is voiced by Howard Jerome. In the episode "To Save Falkor" he becomes sick due to Bastian's cold, forcing Bastian to find a cure before he fades away. It was noted in "The Race for the Ivory Tower" that Falkor was forbidden to take part in The Race because his exceptional speed and luck would be too unfair to the other competitors.

In the TV series Tales from the Neverending Story, one luckdragon appears in the episode where he delivers supplies to the Tatterdemalions. When Atreyu finds said luckdragon crashing in the snow, he discovers that the "luckdragon" is actually an aircraft piloted by a woman named Fly Girl, who was searching for Falkor, the actual luckdragon who disappeared decades ago. The real Falkor is later revealed to be a prisoner in the Dark City by Xayide, but he is later freed by Atreyu and Fly Girl. In contrast to the novel and its adaptations, Falkor does not speak in the series.

Bavaria Studios retains a "side view Falkor" which tourists can climb and ride. The prop is the last remaining version of Falkor from the original film and was used for blue-screen side angle shots.

== Gmork ==
Gmork
- Gmork, as he appears in the 1984 motion picture
- First appearance: The Neverending Story
- Created by: Michael Ende
- Portrayed by: Alan Oppenheimer (speaking lines; uncredited); Frank Welker (vocal effects; uncredited); Edward Yankie (TV series); Don Francks (animated series)

In-universe information
- Species: Werewolf

Gmork is the servant of the power behind the Nothing. He is a werewolf (German: Werwolf) and his appearance in the book is that of a large, wolf-like creature with night-black fur and capable of human speech, but the film gives him blue-black fur and luminous green cat-like eyes, as well as more fangs than an ordinary wolf would have. He, and other dual-natured creatures like him, are able to travel between worlds, changing into a Fantastican or a human depending upon the world.

Atreyu finally meets Gmork in Spook City, where he is chained, and Atreyu employs the name Nobody to hide his identity in shame of his failure to complete his quest. Gmork confesses that he has been hunting a boy sent on a quest by the Childlike Empress to find her a new name, but lost him early on. He then met the Princess of Darkness, Gaya, who upon hearing of his mission to help the Nothing, chained Gmork with an unbreakable chain and leapt into the Nothing, leaving him to starve. Gmork explains to Atreyu the nature of the Nothing, and that a Fantastican who enters it, must become a lie in the human world. Eventually, Gmork reveals the name of the boy he is pursuing, and Atreyu reveals his identity, which causes Gmork to laugh until he finally succumbs to starvation. As Atreyu approaches the dead wolf, the carcass grabs Atreyu in its jaws, which, ironically, prevents Atreyu from succumbing to the overpowering urge exerted by the Nothing to throw himself into it. He is freed from Gmork's grip by Falkor, who escapes with him to the Ivory Tower.

In the film, Gmork almost manages to kill Atreyu in the Swamps of Sadness, but Atreyu is saved by Falkor. Their meeting in Spook City occurs in the film as well, where Gmork attacks Atreyu, impaling himself on an improvised stone knife held by the young warrior.

In the cartoon series, Gmork has a werewolf-like appearance and is voiced by Don Francks.

In the Hallmark mini-series Tales from the Neverending Story, portrayed by Edward Yankie, Gmork is a shapeshifter in the service of Xayide. He also has the ability to travel between worlds. In fact, at the beginning of the series, he causes the death of Bastian's mother, Laura Mackenzie Bux, under the appearance of red-eyed Groenendael (a variety of a Belgian Shepherd). Later on, he assumes the identity of Mr. Blank, a substitute teacher in Bastian's school. When in Fantasia, Gmork does mostly take on the form of a human with canine features. His role also changes from more menacing at the beginning to that of more comical underling, after being punished by Xayide for his inability to steal the book from Bastian. At the end of the series, he is assumed to be shot with an arrow by Atreyu, but his fate remains unclear.

== Grograman ==
Grograman
- First appearance: The Neverending Story
- Created by: Michael Ende
- Portrayed by: Gary Krawford (animated series)

In-universe information
- Alias: The Many Colored Death
- Species: Lion
- Occupation: Guardian of the Desert of Colors

Grograman (German: Graógramán), also known as The Many Colored Death (German: Der Bunte Tod), is the guardian of Goab, the Desert of Colors, which exists in a symbiosis with Perilin the Night Forest. He appears in the form of a huge lion, who changes colors to suit the color of sand under his feet and changes all life around him into sand. Grograman turns into an obsidian statue at night to allow the growth of Perilin. Grograman is the first creature Bastian meets upon his arrival in Fantastica. Bastian is protected from the effect of Grograman's death aura by Auryn and is thus the first living being ever to make friends with him. Grograman is the first one who teaches Bastian something of the nature of Fantastica and he gives Bastian his magic sword Sikanda. One night, Bastian is called away. He promises to return but is ultimately unable to keep his vow.

In the animated series, Grograman (voiced by Gary Krawford) is a fire lion who burns down Perilin to protect Fantastica from being overrun by its roots and branches. He is later captured by Xayide and freed by Bastian.

== Morla ==
Morla
- First appearance: The Neverending Story
- Created by: Michael Ende
- Portrayed by: Robert Easton (film); Pam Hyatt (animated series); Robert Jadah (TV series)

In-universe information
- Alias: The Aged One
- Species: Turtle

Morla, also known as The Aged One (German: Die Uralte), is a giant turtle who lives in the Swamps of Sadness: as the oldest living Fantastican, she has grown indifferent to the fate of Fantastica and her own survival. Reluctantly, she informs Atreyu that the Empress needs a new name and points Atreyu to the Southern Oracle. In the film, Morla has an allergy to youth (Atreyu) and sneezes violently in his presence. The film's version also knows nothing about the illness of the Empress but sends Atreyu directly to the Southern Oracle.

Robert Easton voiced her character in the 1984 film.

In the cartoon series, Morla is voiced by Pam Hyatt.

In the TV series Tales from the Neverending Story, Morla is voiced by Robert Jadah.

== The Old Man of Wandering Mountain ==
The Old Man of Wandering Mountain
- First appearance: The Neverending Story
- Created by: Michael Ende
- Portrayed by: Freddie Jones

In-universe information
- Occupation: Chronicler

The Old Man of Wandering Mountain (German: Der Alte vom Wandernden Berge) is an elderly chronicler (German: Chronist) whose chronicle contains all events in Fantastica. He lives alone in an egg-shaped home on top of the Wandering Mountain, which can be found only by chance or fate. The Old Man appears in the story when the Childlike Empress is forced to use drastic measures to make Bastian fulfill his part in the story. As she approaches his mountain, the Old Man tries to dissuade her from entering to the point of insulting her. On her request, the Old Man reads from his chronicle (starting with Bastian entering the bookstore). As he reads, all events happen again and as they happen again, he writes them down again beginning a vicious circle of eternal repetition which drives Bastian into calling out the Empress' new name.

It is told in the book (Atreyu says it) that the Old Man is from the same nature of the Childlike Empress (whatever this nature is, nobody knows and is never explained) because he is the opposite of her in everything (the Empress herself says). Indeed, he is an unfriendly, grim, ugly, old man who lives lonely, far from everywhere, in an eternal wandering abode that can only be found by chance, while she is a nice, sweet, beautiful, young girl who lives surrounded by a court in a tower located at the very center of Fantastica, that can be found by desire. The Old Man writes everything about Fantastica but doesn't care for anything at all, while Empress cares for all of Fantastica but doesn't write at all.

The Old Man ultimately does not appear in the first film, and his appearance in the third film differs drastically from the novel. He possesses the Great Book which can seemingly write the future on its own accord. He dwells in a hidden crystal cave where he can see outside events using a magic mirror. He is visited by the Childlike Empress and her guard Big Head, who remain with him until the end of the Nasty crisis. In this film, he grovels before the Empress and sees it as an honor that the monarch would visit him.

== Pyornkrachzark the Rock-Biter ==
Rock-Biter
- First appearance: The Neverending Story
- Created by: Michael Ende
- Portrayed by: Alan Oppenheimer (1st film, uncredited); Dan Fincher (2nd film); Gary Martin (3rd film); Harvey Atkin (animated series)

In-universe information
- Species: Rockbiter
- Occupation: Messenger

Pyornkrachzark (German: Pjörnrachzarck) is a Rockbiter (German: Felsenbeißer, also spelled Felsenbeisser), a large creature made of stone. The Rockbiter species are named due to their diet of rocks and earth-based materials. The Rockbiter seen in the film particularly has a liking for limestone. In the novel and the first film, the Rockbiter appears early among the messengers sent to see the Childlike Empress at the Ivory Tower during the Nothing crisis. In the first film, he ultimately reappears, encountered by Atreyu. He has lost faith in himself after failing to save his travelling companions from the Nothing, and advises Atreyu to flee. Near the end of the film, he and his two traveling companions wave at Bastian as he flies by on Falkor.

In the second and third films, Rockbiter's wife appears in the third film and his son appears in the second and third. Rockbiter Junior is the same size as a human and is rather gluttonous and playful. He is sent to Earth during a wish overload caused by Bastian, Falkor, Bark Troll, Engywook, and Urgl. He is later saved from falling to his death by Falkor and they are reunited with Bastian. Rockbiter and his wife nearly split due to the absence of their son and the further effects of the Nasties, who are in possession of the book and Auryn, but the family is reunited at the end of the film. Rockbiter also sings a rather corrupt version of Born To Be Wild by Steppenwolf. In the cartoon series, Mr. and Mrs. Rockbiter are voiced by Harvey Atkin and Jayne Eastwood while Rockbiter Junior is voiced by Lisa Yamanaka.

== Gluckuk ==
Gluckuk (German: Ückück) is a Tiny Man (Winzling) riding a racing snail (Rennschnecke). He was sent by his race to see the Childlike Empress at the Ivory Tower during the Nothing crisis. In the film, he is called Teeny Weeny and portrayed by Deep Roy. In the cartoon series, Gluckuk and his racing snail are voiced by John Stocker.

== Vooshvazool ==
Vooshvazool (German: Wúschwusul) is a Nighthob (Nachtalb) who rides on a bat. He was sent by his race to see the Childlike Empress at the Ivory Tower during the Nothing crisis. In the 1995 cartoon series, the Nighthob is voiced by Adrian Truss.

== Blubb ==
Blubb is a will-o'-the-wisp (German: Irrlicht) sent by his race to see the Childlike Empress at the Ivory Tower during the Nothing crisis. In the cartoon series, Blubb is voiced by John McGrath.

== The Southern Oracle ==
Southern Oracle
- First appearance: The Neverending Story
- Created by: Michael Ende
- Portrayed by: Ellen-Ray Hennessy (animated series); Jane Wheeler (TV series)

In-universe information
- Aliases: Uyulala; The Voice of Still
- Occupation: Oracle

The Southern Oracle (German: Das Südliche Orakel), also known as Uyulala (Uyulála), is a mysterious all-knowing oracle guarded by three magical gates. She is depicted as a disembodied female voice who speaks in rhymed speech and otherwise sings ceaselessly to maintain her existence. To speak with Uyulala, one must pass through the three gates:

- The first gate is the Great Riddle Gate, which consists of two Sphinxes who face one another. Those caught between their gaze are frozen on the spot and doomed to remain until they solve every riddle in the world or until they die.
- The second gate is the Magic Mirror Gate, a moon-like mirror that reflects the truest nature of the observer. This often frightens people into retreat or hysteria, but the observer, to pass this gate, must walk through its reflection.
- The third gate is the No-Key Gate, an indestructible keyless door that responds to a person's will. Only by losing the desire to enter may one get it to open.

Once past, Atreyu learns the reason why the Childlike Empress is ill and what he must find in order to restore her health. Uyulala is then quiet and the Southern Oracle with its three gates is silently destroyed by the Nothing. Passing through the first two gates causes Atreyu to first lose all fear, and then all memory of himself. This allows him to open the No-Key Gate, where Bastian's voice keeps Atreyu from wandering.

The film version of the Southern Oracle shares the generalities, but the first gate judges whether the person attempting to pass through it "feels his own worth"; if the person is doubtful of its ability to pass through safely, the two Sphinxes incinerate the visitor. The second gate is a mirror-like, located in a snowy wilderness and there is ultimately no third gate. The Oracle itself is ultimately two blue glowing Sphinxes like the yellow sphinxes at the first gate and speaks in prose. As with the novel, the Oracle crumbles and dies after revealing the cure for the Childlike Empress' condition.

In Tales from the Neverending Story, a hero must pass through the Riddle Gate, which tests his confidence in himself. He must then answer a riddle and pass through a mirror that displays the necessary thing he needs. In the case of Atreyu, he lands in a library owned by the wizard nicknamed "the Curiosity" who teaches him to read. Thereafter, he passes through a glass door on which the name Uyulala is inscribed, to find the Oracle much as she is described in the novel. In the series, Uyulala is voiced by Jane Wheeler. In The Neverending Story cartoon series, the Southern Oracle is depicted as two sphinxes facing each other and are voiced by Ellen-Ray Hennessy.

== Xayide ==
Xayide
- First appearance: The Neverending Story
- Created by: Michael Ende
- Portrayed by: Clarissa Burt (film); Victoria Sanchez (TV series); Janet Laine-Green (animated series)

In-universe information
- Alias: Mistress of Horok Castle
- Species: Fantasian
- Gender: Female
- Occupation: Sorceress

Xayide (German: Xayíde) is an evil sorceress who appears later in the book after Bastian enters the world of Fantasia. Xayide lives in a castle that is shaped like a hand, called Horok the Seeing Hand, because its multitude of windows appears like human eyes. Xayide's most striking physical features are her heterochromatic red and green eyes. She can control anything empty, and thus she employs guards that are made of empty suits of plate armour. She presents to Bastian a warm and worshipping exterior, in the hope to herself replace the Childlike Empress as ruler of Fantasia. Realizing she cannot defeat Bastian by force, she persuades him to invade the Ivory Tower. After losing Bastian, she is crushed to death by her iron minions who resist her wanting magic.

Xayide is portrayed by actress and model Clarissa Burt in The NeverEnding Story II: The Next Chapter, which is loosely based upon the second half of the novel. In the adaption, she is the personified avatar of an entity similar to the Nothing, called the Emptiness, which is born of the dying imagination of the collective human species. In both media, she gives Bastian the belt Ghemmal, which turns its wearer invisible and was intended to spy on Atreyu. She manipulates Bastian by convincing him that he fulfills own wishes, while at the same time taking away his memories. She meets her end in the film when Bastian uses his last wish to give her a sense of compassion, whereupon she destroys herself to amend the damage done by her.

Xayide is the main villain in the 1995 cartoon series, voiced by Janet Laine-Green. In the show, she wears green robes with an eye mask with yellow slits.

In the miniseries Tales from the Neverending Story, portrayed by Victoria Sanchez, Xayide is the Childlike Empress' sister and the ruler of a Dark City. Jealous of her sister, she intends to conquer the whole Fantasia and enslave all its inhabitants. She is also aware of the existence of the magical book The Neverending Story and sends Gmork (and later a female Fantasian) to retrieve the book. At the end of the series, she dies when she reads a book, turning herself into a dust, although it is implied that she might be alive after Bastian and Coreander notice that Bastian's classmate and another "Chosen One" named Fallon went to Fantasia to seek her.

=== Iron minions ===
Xayide has made use of minions made of armor and resemble empty suits of armor.

In the second film, these creatures were called "Giants" because of their towering size and possess a horned crustacean-like appearance and lobster-like claws. When Bastian wishes for Xayide to have a heart, the giants are destroyed alongside their mistress. It took 19 men from Munich in Germany to portray these giants.

In the cartoon series, the Giants appear as foot soldiers of Xayide.

In the live-action series, the Giants are replaced by Dark Knights, a hollow armours that are magically enchanted by Xayide.

== Ygramul ==
Ygramul
- First appearance: The Neverending Story
- Created by: Michael Ende
- Portrayed by: Marilyn Lightstone (animated series)

In-universe information
- Alias: The Many
- Species: Insect hive

Ygramul The Many (German: Ygramul, die Viele) is a creature that lives in the land of Dead Mountains. She is portrayed as a shapeshifter, who often takes the form of a giant spider and builds webs to catch its prey. The creature is actually composed of many little hornet-like insects who share a single hive mind. Ygramul's poison is deadly and kills within one hour, but grants the victim the ability to teleport to any location within Fantastica before succumbing to its effects. In the novel, this poison is the means by which Atreyu travels to the home of Engywook and Urgl, near the Southern Oracle. At this point in the story Falkor the luckdragon is introduced; he is caught in Ygramul's web, and also uses the power of Ygramul's poison to follow Atreyu. The lingering effects of the poison are nursed out of the two by Urgl, while Engywook, a scholar of the Southern Oracle, instructs Atreyu on the challenges he is to encounter within the Oracle's demesne.

In The Neverending Story cartoon series, Ygramul is shown in her spider form and is voiced by Marilyn Lightstone. In "To Save Falkor", Bastian encounters Ygramul in the Dead Mountains while looking for a cure for Falkor's illness.

== Bastian's dad ==
Bastian's dad (portrayed by Gerald McRaney in the first film, John Wesley Shipp in the second film, and Kevin McNulty in the third film) is described to have grown distant from his son after the death of his wife, although this changes when he and Bastian are reunited at the end of the book.

In the second film, Bastian's father is given the first name Barney Bux and follows Bastian's journey by reading the book and reunited with his son at the conclusion of the film.

In the third film, he appears to have no memories of reading the book. He marries a woman named Jane Baxter and thus gains a new family, along with a daughter named Nicole who plays a main role in the third film.

In the cartoon series, Bastian's dad (using the name Barney Bux from the second film) is voiced by Geoffrey Bowes.

In the 2001 TV series, Tales from the Neverending Story, Bastian's dad is renamed Michael Bux, portrayed by Noël Burton. Michael is a lawyer who divorced his wife Laura Mackenzie Bux one year prior to the events of the series. After Laura's death in a car crash (caused by Gmork), Michael starts a relationship with a realtor named April Jones, who is secretly a Fantasian in disguise, sent by Xayide to steal The Neverending Story, a magical book in possession of Michael's son Bastian. In one episode, he is approached by Gmork (a Fantasian disguised as a substitute teacher Mr. Blank) who hires him to be his lawyer. After Mr. Blank threatens to Bastian at school, Bastian tells his father about his threats, and Michael rejects Blank's offer.

== Bastian's mom ==
Bastian's mom is an unseen character in The Neverending Story novel. She is Bastian's mother and a wife of Bastian's dad. The novel states that she died sometime prior to the events of the novel. Her death causes her husband to distance himself from his son, but this later changes when Bastian and his father reunite at the end of the book.

Bastian's mother briefly appears in the flashback scene of The NeverEnding Story II: The Next Chapter, portrayed by Helena Michell.

In the 2001 TV series, Tales from the Neverending Story, Bastian's mother is renamed Laura Mackenzie Bux, portrayed by Jane Wheeler. She is an ex-wife of Michael Bux and appears briefly in the beginning of the series where she dies in the car crash caused by Gmork, a Fantasian who disguised himself as a black dog with red eyes and later appeared as a substitute teacher in Bastian's school.

== Bark Troll ==
Bark Troll is an anthropomorphic tree-creature supporting character and friend of Bastian who appears in The Neverending Story cartoon and the third film which is based on the characters as they appeared in the animated series. He is loosely based on three characters of a species called bark trolls, which appeared to advise Atreyu about the Nothing.

In the third film, Bark Troll is performed by Kaefan Shaw and voiced by William Hootkins.

In the 1995 cartoon series, Bark Troll is voiced by Richard Binsley and serves as Bastian's occasional companion.

== Nimbly ==
Nimbly is a character who appears in The Neverending Story novel. In the book, he is a Fantastican creature that looks like a rabbit having feathers instead of fur.

Nimbly appears in The NeverEnding Story II: The Next Chapter, portrayed by Martin Umbach. In the film, he is a bird-like creature and a henchmen of Xayide, who sends him on a task to falsely befriend Bastian and get him to make wishes with the Auryn. During their quest, after Atreyu is accidentally killed by Bastian in a fight, he realizes that Xayide wants to destroy Bastian and changes the side, thus helping Bastian on how to reach the Silver City and revealing his lost memory to him.

Nimbly appears in the animated series The Neverending Story, voiced by Neil Crone.

== Cairon ==
Cairon the Black Centaur (German: Caíron, der Schwarz-Zentaur) is a herald of the Childlike Empress and in-between bearer of Auryn who passed it to Atreyu. In the novel, he appears as an elderly black centaur with his lower half with the striped pattern of a zebra, and is portrayed as one of Fantastica's most renowned healers of his time.

In the first film, he appears as a tall-headed humanoid and is portrayed by Moses Gunn.

In the TV series, Tales from the Neverending Story, Cairon is portrayed by Tyrone Benskin.

By his name and status of a centaur and physician, Cairon is an allusion to the mythological Greek Chiron.

== Dame Eyola ==
Dame Eyola (German: Dame Aiuóla) is a plant taking the form of a motherly woman who lives in the House of Change, who cares for Bastian until he realizes what his innermost desire is which will carry him back to the human world.

== The Four Heroes ==
The Four Heroes are swordsmen who appear in the second half of the novel, said to be the bravest and strongest warriors in all of Fantastica, who participate in a tournament in the Silver City of Amarganth. One is identified as Hero Hynreck (or Huunreck), who is infatuated with Princess Oglamar; the other three, Hykrion, Hysbald and Hydorn, accompany Bastian on his journey and swear allegiance to him. They are often portrayed as cheerful beings, but when Bastian decides to make himself an emperor, they get drunk and become useless. They survive the battle against Atreyu's rebellion but lose track of Bastian, and go their separate ways to look for him.

The Four Heroes ultimately do not appear in the film adaptations of the novel. Hykrion, Hysbald and Hynreck appear separately in episodes of the Tales from The Neverending Story television series: "The Gift of the Name", "Home Sweet Home", "Badge of Courage" and "Deus Ex Machina". They are portrayed by Jasson Finney, Fernando Chien, and Marcel Jeannin, respectively.

== Ilwan ==
Ilwan (German: Iluan) is a blue genie with a bird's beak in place of his nose and mouth. Ilwan appeared in the novel where he became one of Bastian's closest servants but was killed during the battle for the Ivory Tower.

== Querquobad ==
Querquobad, the Silver Sage is the ruler of the silver ship city of Amarganth, which was built by the Acharis and swims on a lake made by their tears.

== Argax ==
Argax is a sapient monkey who is the de facto governor of the City of Old Emperors (German: Alte-Kaiser-Stadt), whose inhabitants consist of human Fantastica travellers who had expended all their memories on wishes after failing to find their way home, turning them into lunatics. Bastian meets him while chasing Atreyu after the Battle of the Ivory Tower, and learns from Argax about his eventual debilitating fate, which brings him back to his senses.

Argax also appears in the 1995 animated series, where he was voiced by Andrew Sabiston, as a recurring character. This incarnation more resembles an ape (chimpanzee) than a monkey.

== Large Head ==
Large Head is a character who appears in The NeverEnding Story III (portrayed by Thomas Petruo) and the 1995 animated series (voiced by Colin Fox). In both versions, he is a human with a large forehead and works as an advisor to the Childlike Empress. In the cartoon, he and Bastian do not often see eye to eye. They once worked together to solve the attacks on a mountain path by a mountain creature. Also in the cartoon, he has a wife who is called Mrs. Large Head, voiced by Kay Tremblay.

== Shadow Goblin ==
Shadow Goblin (voiced by Benedict Campbell) is a character in the animated series who is the master thief of Fantasia. The Shadow Goblin wants nothing more than to become the richest creature in Fantasia.

== Vermin ==
Vermin (voiced by Len Carlson) is a bat-winged rat and Shadow Goblin's minion in the cartoon series. His job is to spy across Fantasia for things his boss might steal. He mostly thinks about food, rather than riches.

== Shexper ==
Shexper is recalled as a past traveller to Fantastica in Chapter 18, from whom Hykrion, Hysbald and Hydorn learned a song ("When that I was a little tiny boy, With Hey, Ho, the wind and the rain..."). The name may be a mispronunciation of "Shakespeare".

== Smerg ==
Smerg (German: Smärg) is a dragon created by Bastian for Hynreck to slay and prove his worthiness to Princess Oglamar. He has the tail of a scorpion, back legs of a grasshopper, body of a rat, and wings of a bat, with the heads of an old man and old woman instead of eyes.

He appears in the second film as a normal dragon when Bastian wishes him into existence (as in the novel). He was ultimately meant to be a new steed to carry Bastian to Horok Castle, but it did not go well and attacked him. Bastian and Atreyu follow Smerg to Horok Castle where it was destroyed by its defenses.

== Threehead ==
Threehead is a three-headed knight and Xayide's servant in the 1995 animated series, voiced by James Rankin. Each of his personalities are represented by a different head that pops up depending on his mood. The blue-haired head is his happiness and loyalty, red-haired his sadness and fear, and green-haired his anger and envy.

== Tri-Face ==
Tri-Face (portrayed by Christopher Burton) is a three-faced scientist who is Xayide's servant in the second film. Each face represents a part of his personality and spins into place depending on his mood. This character is based on a figure from the novel named Four-Quarters Troll (Vier-Vierteltroll) or Temperamentling, who becomes a member of Bastian's entourage.

== Yikka ==
Yikka (German: Jicha) is a female hinny who acts as Bastian's steed during the second half of the novel. She is quite faithful to him, but under Xayide's influence, Bastian allows her to leave his side to start a family with an attractive male pegasus.

== Yor ==
Yor is the picture miner of Yor's Minroud, a mine from which he excavates dream pictures (which make up the soil of Fantastica), who helps Bastian find his lost dream. In the 1995 animated series, Yor is voiced by William Colgate.

== Slip ==
Slip is a character who appears in The NeverEnding Story III, portrayed by Jack Black. Slip is a leader of Nasties, a group of bullies who frequently bully Bastian in the high school. After they are expelled from the school by janitor, they follow Bastian to bookstore owned by Mr. Coreander. Bastian escapes from them by using The Neverending Story to transport in Fantasia. Slip and his group find the book as well and use it to bombard Fantasia with fireballs and a storm. They later steal the magical amulet Auryn that was used by Bastian's stepsister Nicole Baxter. With Fantasia under the Nasties' control, the inhabitants of their realm become corrupted, which also affects the human world. Bastian manages to get Auryn and The Neverending Story book from the Nasties, and he and Nicole manage to return Fantasia and human world in normal state. Bastian later discovers that Slip and his group have turned into friendly classmates and are no longer bothering him.

== Artax ==
Artax is a Fantastican horse and Atreyu's best friend who appears in The Neverending Story novel and its adaptations. In the novel and its 1984 film adaptation Artax and Atreyu go in search for a cure for the Childlike Empress in Fantasia. Artax dies in the Swamp of Sadness, but is brought to life when Bastian recreates Fantasia. Artax also appears in The NeverEnding Story II: The Next Chapter, the 1995 animated series (voiced by Don Dickinson) and 2001 live-action series Tales from the Neverending Story. In the live-action TV adaption, unlike novel and 1984 film adaptation, Artax dies when he drinks the Fountain of Nectar in the abandoned City of Old Emperors, where he becomes an ice sculpture. Artax is presumably restored to life following defeat of Xayide by Bastian and his friends at the end of series.

== Gaya ==
Gaya, the Princess of Darkness is an unseen character in The Neverending Story novel. She was the ruler of Spook City, a home where various monsters lived, such as vampires, ghosts, and zombies. She is mentioned by Gmork when talking to Atreyu. Gmork reveals to him that once he arrived in Spook City, she initially treated him nicely and he was infatuated with her. Gaya soon learned that Gmork is the servant of the Nothing (who intends to destroy Fantasia), and she chained him to the rock to prevent him from completing his mission. Gaya however succumbed to the magical lure of the Nothing, went insane, and committed suicide by jumping into it.

Gaya appears in the animated series The Neverending Story, voiced by Annick Obonsawin. In the episode "Spook City", Gaya, a little spook, meets Bastian in the Forbidden Forest and begs him to liberate her brother Meeka (voiced by Dov Tiefenbach) who was captured in Spook City by Gmork and the necromancer.

== Fantastican creatures ==
The following is a list of creatures who appear in The Neverending Story novel and its media adaptations:

- Acharis are worm-like creatures so ashamed by their own ugliness that they hide underground and constantly cry. Their acidic tears eat away the soil around them, allowing them to mine Fantastican silver, which they use to construct beautiful buildings. Bastian pities them and transforms them into the Shlamoofs: anarchistic, clown-faced butterfly-like creatures who destroy all of the work they did as Acharis. They pursue Bastian and demand that he becomes their leader, but they are driven off by Atreyu and Falkor. Acharis appear in the animated series adaptation, in the episode "The Tears of Sadness", where Xayide uses their tears to poison the Fountains of Life and water in Fantasia, to petrify anyone who drinks water or merely looks at it. Bastian meets Engywook and Urgl who prepare for him a potion to counter this curse. They confront Xayide, but drop the potion in the fountain as she hurls an explosive beam. This transforms the Acharis into the ever-laughing Shlamoofs and dispels the curse, which forces Xayide to retreat.
- Blondycats are feline creatures with shaggy blonde fur, no bigger than a five-year-old child. One Blondycat appears in the animated series adaptation, voiced by John Stocker.
- Four Winds Giants are four giants who guard the winds of Fantastica. They constantly fight with each other, which causes the separation of Atreyu and Falkor in the novel. The four of them by name are: Lirr, the black North Wind; Sheerek, the sulfur-yellow South Wind; Baureo, the leaden-gray East Wind; and Mayestri, the fiery-red West Wind. Uncharacteristically silenced by Auryn, it is through the Wind Giants that Atreyu learns that Fantastica has no boundary. In the film, they are ultimately replaced by the Nothing. In the animated series, the South Wind, West Wind, East Wind, and North Wind Giants are voiced by Dan Hennessey, Benedict Campbell, George Buza, and Susan Johnston, respectively.
- Greenskins, also known as the Grass People, are Atreyu's people. The Greenskins are a folk of hunters and gatherers with a culture and lifestyle very similar to the North American Plains Indians. As their name implies, their skin is of an olive-green hue, and their hair is blueish-black. Their home is the Grassy Sea, a vast prairie in an undisclosed part of Fantastica bordered by the Silver Mountains range.
- Iceheads are a race of creatures which reside in the Mountains of Fate where the Childlike Empress encounters the Old Man of Wandering Mountain. They are described as giant humanoids covered in (or made of) ice who move so slowly that a single footstep takes years to complete. As a result, they are fairly isolated even from their own kind and more so from any other living creature in Fantastica. Their original German name - Eisbolde - is an amalgam of the German words "Eis" (ice) and "kobold".
- Nighthobs are nocturnal humanoids that live in the southern regions of Fantastica. They have sharp features, wild hair, and wear drab clothing. Nighthobs are known to employ large bats that they fly much like a hang glider. The most notable of the Nighthobs is Vooshvazool, who was sent on the mission to the Ivory Tower.
- Rockbiters are large rock creatures that eat rocks and delight in different geological varieties. Rockbiters are often seen riding stone bicycles. Despite their gargantuan size and intimidating appearance, Rockbiters are generally kind and concerned with the well-being of Fantasticans smaller than themselves.
- Sassafranians are a race of humanoids who are born elderly. Their physical age regresses as they advance in years, and they die when they reach infancy state.
- Tinys are a race of tiny people that ride on racing snails. They are quite sophisticated, but due to their size, they live in trees, erecting entire villages whose dwellings are connected by a huge number of ladders, slides, and stairways.
- Twee is a hippopotamus-like creature with red and white stripes, whose forequarters and hindquarters tend to run independently of each other.
- Yskálnari are a race of humanoid people living at the edge of a sea of mist, which can be navigated only by boats fashioned from special reeds and which are propelled by willpower. In the animated series, the Yskálnari are depicted as seal-like humanoids manning conventional wooden ships which can navigate the Mist Sea.

The following creatures appear in the first film in the Childlike Empress' throne room when Cairon mentions her illness and are unnamed:

- Big-Headed Rock Creatures are made of rock that have big heads.
- Bird Humans are a race of bird-headed humans.
- Elephant-Headed Creature is a humanoid elephant.
- Four-Faced People are a race of humans who have four faces.
- Monkey-Headed Creature is a creature with a monkey head.
- Palm-Topped Creatures are humanoids with palm tree-like growths on top of their heads.
- Three-Headed Creature has an unspecified head, a wolf head, and a goat head.
- Two-Faced People are a race of humans with two faces that have two noses, two mouths, and three eyes.
