= Tim Hampton =

Tim Hampton may refer to:

- Tim Hampton (politician), American libertarian
- Tim Hampton (musician), member of British rock bank Bromheads Jacket
- Tim Hampton (producer) (1948–2013), British film producer
- Tim Hampton, trainer of wrestler Kamala
