= The NeverEnding Story III =

1994 film directed by Peter MacDonald

- German theatrical release poster
- Directed by: Peter MacDonald
- Screenplay by: Jeff Lieberman
- Story by: Karin Howard
- Based on: The Neverending Story by Michael Ende
- Produced by: Dieter Geissler
- Starring: Jason James Richter; Melody Kay; Jack Black; Freddie Jones; Julie Cox; Tony Robinson
- Cinematography: Robin Vidgeon
- Edited by: Michael Bradsell
- Music by: Peter Wolf
- Production companies: CineVox Filmproduktion; Studio Babelsberg; Dieter Geissler Filmproduktion
- Distributed by: Warner Bros. (Germany); Miramax Films (United States)
- Release dates: October 23, 1994 (Berlin); October 27, 1994 (Germany); February 2, 1996 (United States)
- Running time: 95 minutes
- Countries: Germany; United States
- Language: English
- Budget: $25 million
- Box office: $5 million (Germany)

The NeverEnding Story III: Escape from Fantasia (German: Die unendliche Geschichte III – Rettung aus Phantásien), also known as The NeverEnding Story III: Return to Fantasia, is a 1994 fantasy-adventure film directed by Peter MacDonald. It is the third and final film in the franchise. It stars Jason James Richter as Bastian Balthazar Bux, and Jack Black in an early role as school bully Slip. This film primarily used the characters from Michael Ende's novel The Neverending Story (1979), with the exception of Atreyu, who is absent from the film, and introduced a new storyline. It was an international co-production between the United States and Germany. It was a critical and commercial failure.

The special creature effects were provided by Jim Henson's Creature Shop.

== Plot ==
In a prologue, the Old Man of Wandering Mountain reads from a large book, begins to record a prophecy of a day when "The Nasty" will arrive in Fantasia, and describes the savior of "Extraordinary Courage".

Bastian Balthazar Bux is now 13 years old, and his father Barney has married a woman named Jane, and moved into her house in a new neighborhood. Jane's daughter Nicole is displeased at having a new family. Bastian has also started high school, where he has become a victim of the Nasties, a quintet of bullies led by Slip. Bastian arranges for them to be expelled with the help of the janitor after the Nasties trap him in the boiler room.

He later flees to the library, where he is surprised to find Carl Conrad Coreander and The Neverending Story. The Nasties locate him, but he uses the book to escape to Fantasia, where he is reunited with Falkor, Engywook and Urgl. On Earth, the Nasties find The Neverending Story and use it to bombard Fantasia with fireballs and a storm. With wooden Bark Troll, Bastian and his friends head for the Wandering Mountains to speak with the Childlike Empress, who asks Bastian to find The Neverending Story using AURYN. Falkor, Barky, the gnomes, and Rockbiter's son, Junior, help him, but a "wish overload" scatters them all across Earth, where Barky ends up in a conifer forest, Falkor saves Junior from falling to his death near Mount Rushmore, and the gnomes arrive in Nome, Alaska. Bastian locates Falkor and Junior, and Falkor flies off to find the others while Junior stays at Bastian's house. Rockbiter sadly informs his wife that Junior is gone, and the Nasties provoke them to quarrel.

Nicole takes AURYN from Bastian's room, discovers its wishing abilities, and takes it on a shopping trip to the local mall. Bark Troll arrives at Bastian's house disguised as a garden plant, while the Gnomes are mailed to him in a box. The reunited group go in search of Nicole, but the Nasties find AURYN first, whereupon giant crustacean creatures appear in Fantasia to kill the Empress and her advisors. Everyone in the mall turns evil, including Mr. Coreander and Bastian and Nicole's parents. Bastian is struck by lightning, and begins to succumb to the wills of the Nasties, but Nicole saves him, and Bastian recovers AURYN and the book in a fight. The Fantasians return to Fantasia, which is restored to its former magnificence. Bastian and Nicole manage to keep their parents from divorcing, and Junior is reunited with his parents. Nicole and Bastian return to school the next day and find that Bastian has changed Slip and the Nasties into friendly classmates, and Bastian returns The Neverending Story to Mr. Coreander.

== Cast ==
- Jason James Richter as Bastian Balthazar Bux
- Melody Kay as Nicole Baxter, Bastian's stepsister
- Jack Black as Slip ("The Nasty"), the leader of the Nasties
- Freddie Jones as Carl Conrad Coreander, a former local librarian; Old Man of Wandering Mountain
- Julie Cox as Childlike Empress
- Moya Brady as Urgl
- Tony Robinson as Engywook
- Tracey Ellis as Jane Bux, Bastian's stepmother
- Kevin McNulty as Barney Bux, Bastian's father
- Frederick Warder as Mr. Rockbiter Sr.
- William Todd-Jones as Mrs. Rockbiter
- Dave Forman as Mr. Rockbiter Jr.
- Gordon Robertson as Falkor
- Kaefan Shaw as Bark Troll
- Mark Acheson as the Janitor
- Ryan Bollman as Dog, a member of the Nasties
- Carole Finn as Mookie, a member of the Nasties and Slip's girlfriend
- Nicole Parker as Coil, a member of the Nasties
- Adrien Dorval as Rage, a member of the Nasties

=== Voices ===
- William Hootkins as Bark Troll; Falkor
- Mac McDonald as Mrs. Rockbiter
- Gary Martin as Rockbiter; Mr. Rockchewer; Junior Rockchewer

Mount Rushmore is a national memorial centered on a colossal sculpture carved into the granite face of Mount Rushmore in the Black Hills near Keystone, South Dakota, United States. In the scene of the film, Junior arrives there.

== Soundtrack ==
Music From & Inspired By The Neverending Story III: Here Come The Fantasians

Soundtrack album by various artists
- Released: 1994
- Genre: Pop
- Length: 1:17:53
- Label: WEA

No.	Title	Writer(s)	Performer(s)	Length
1.	"The Neverending Story"	Giorgio Moroder, Keith Forsey	Real Im-Pact	3:36
2.	"Give Peace a Chance (Single Mix)"	Attack II, Buzz Gardner, Tom Jaques G. Cain, T. Adler (Leon), Steve Pool, Tom Card, Eric Trinkaus	Intermission	3:52
3.	"Games People Play"	Joe South	Inner Circle	3:26
4.	"Girly Girl"	Luci van Org, Goldkind, Ash Wednesday	Lucilectric	3:13
5.	"Crash! Boom! Bang!"	Per Gessle	Roxette	4:25
6.	"Kiss from a Rose"	Seal	Seal	4:47
7.	"Mission of Love (Radio Edit)"	Toby Gad, Jacqueline Némorin	Nemorin	3:33
8.	"Heart of Stone"	David A. Stewart, Shara Nelson	Dave Stewart	4:36
9.	"Shortcut to Forever"	Peter Wolf, Ina Wolf	Phillip Ingram & Siedah Garrett	3:31
10.	"Fantasian Homecoming"	Wolf	The Munich Symphony Orchestra	2:50
11.	"I'm a Stoneman"	Torsten Börger, Claudia A. Wohlfromm	The Stoneman	3:22
12.	"United (Radio Edit)"	Alex Christensen, Frank Peterson, Mark Wahlberg, Joe Paquette	Prince Ital Joe feat. Marky Mark	4:02
13.	"Hand in Hand"	Attack II, Tom Card, Steve Pool, Tom Jaques G. Cain, Th. Adler, Erik Trinkaus	Ophelia	4:07
14.	"Back & Forth (LP Version)"	R. Kelly	Aaliyah	3:51
15.	"Fire"	Alex Auer, Hans Mappes, Maik Hahn, Rod Gammons	Shyboy	3:38
16.	"How, How (The Pre Mix)"	Boris Blank, Dieter Meier	Yello	5:54
17.	"Nasty World"	Börger, Wohlfromm, Windsor Robinson	Real Im-Pact	4:05
18.	"Dream On (The Neverending Story)"	Gad, Némorin	Nemorin	3:52
19.	"Born to Be Wild"	Bonfire	The Stoneman	3:38
20.	"Shortcut to Forever"	Peter Wolf, Ina Wolf	The Munich Symphony Orchestra	2:38
Total length:				01:17:53

== Production ==
In February 1993 at the American Film Market, Peter MacDonald was hired by CineVox Entertainment to direct the fantasy adventure The NeverEnding Story III, from a script by Jeff Lieberman, with production scheduled for summer of that year. The film was announced with a budget at $25 million with producer Dieter Geissler, who produced the first two entries, and Tim Hampton, with production to take place for six months in Vancouver and Germany. Principal photography began in August of that year. The film's production was motivated by the success of the previous two entries, which had collectively grossed $150 million worldwide, with the second entry, The NeverEnding Story II: The Next Chapter, also a robust seller on home video. As both previous entries had struggled theatrically in the United States, the producers made a conscious effort to tailor the third entry for the American market with Jason James Richter cast as Bastian Balthazar Bux on the basis of his recognition from Free Willy. Author of the original book Michael Ende had no involvement with the film, with producer Tim Hampton commenting:

We own all rights to the title now. Ende had certain rights on the previous two movies. He had a lot of control on Wolfgang Petersen's The NeverEnding Story. On George Miller's The Next Chapter, it was more along the lines of we had to show him what we were doing at all times and then he'd give us his opinion. But here we're clear and free to do what we want.

Peter MacDonald was not allowed to cut the film himself, with the editing decisions made solely by the producers.

== Release ==
The NeverEnding Story III was first released in Germany on October 27, 1994, by Warner Bros. under the Family Entertainment label. In the Philippines, it was released by Jemah Films on January 4, 1995, with an advanced screening on January 2. The film was given a limited release in the United States on February 2, 1996, by Miramax under their Family Films label.

=== Home media ===
The film was released on VHS on February 11, 1997, by Miramax Home Entertainment. A 4K HDR Blu-ray release by Filmjuwelen was released in Germany on September 18, 2025.

== Reception ==
=== Critical response ===
As of October 2026, the film has a Rotten Tomatoes score of 20% based on 10 reviews from critics. Variety gave a negative review of the film, calling it a "charmless", "desperate" reworking of the franchise, and suggested it be subtitled Bastian Goes to High School.

=== Box office ===
By late December 1994, the film grossed $5 million in Germany.
