= Michael Ende =

German writer (1929–1995)

- Ende in 1962 (photo by Christine Meile)
- Born: Michael Andreas Helmuth Ende; 12 November 1929; Garmisch, Germany
- Died: 28 August 1995 (aged 65); Filderstadt, Germany
- Occupation: Fiction writer
- Writing career
- Period: c. 1960–1995
- Genres: Fantasy, children's fiction
- Notable works: The Neverending Story; Momo; Jim Button and Luke the Engine Driver
- Website: michaelende.de

Michael Andreas Helmuth Ende (German pronunciation: [ˈmɪçaʔeːl ʔanˈdʁeːas ˈhɛlmuːt ˈʔɛndə]; 12 November 1929 – 28 August 1995) was a German writer of fantasy and children's fiction. He is known for his epic fantasy The Neverending Story (with its 1980s film adaptation and a 1995 animated television adaptation); other well-known works include Momo and Jim Button and Luke the Engine Driver. His works have been translated into more than 40 languages and sold more than 35 million copies.

== Early life ==
Ende was born on 12 November 1929 in Garmisch, Bavaria, the only child of the surrealist painter Edgar Ende and Luise Bartholomä Ende, a physiotherapist. In 1935, when Michael was six, the Ende family moved to the "artists' quarter of Schwabing" in Munich (Haase). Growing up in this rich artistic and literary environment influenced Ende's later writing.

In 1936, his father's work was declared "degenerate art" and banned by the Nazi Party, so Edgar Ende was forced to draw and paint in secret.

== Second World War ==
World War II heavily influenced Ende's childhood. He was twelve years old when he witnessed the first Allied bombing raid on Munich:

Our street was consumed by flames. The fire didn't crackle; it roared. The flames were roaring. I remember singing and careering through the blaze like a drunkard. I was in the grip of a kind of euphoria. I still don't truly understand it, but I was almost tempted to cast myself into the fire like a moth into the light.

He was horrified, however, by the 1943 Hamburg bombing, which he experienced while visiting his paternal uncle. At the first available opportunity his uncle put him on a train back to Munich. There, Ende attended the Maximillians Gymnasium until schools were closed as the air raids intensified and pupils were evacuated. Ende returned to Garmisch-Partenkirchen, where he was billeted in a boarding-house, Haus Kramerhof and later in Haus Roseneck. It was there that his interest in German poetry was awakened. As well as writing his own poetry, he began to study various literary movements and styles. As most recent German poetry was banned as part of censorship in Nazi Germany, he instead studied the German Romantic poet Novalis, whose Hymns to the Night made a great impression on him.

In 1944, Edgar Ende's studio at no. 90 Kaulbachstraße, Munich went up in flames and over two hundred and fifty paintings and sketches were destroyed, as well as all his prints and etchings. Ernst Buchner, Director of Public Art for Bavaria, was still in possession of a number of Ende's paintings, which survived the raids. After the bombing, Luise Ende was relocated to the Munich district of Solln. In 1945, Edgar Ende was taken as a prisoner of war by American GIs, but was released soon after the end of the war.

In 1945, German youths as young as fourteen were drafted into the Volkssturm and sent to war against the advancing Allied armies. Three of Michael Ende's classmates were killed on their first day of combat. Ende was also drafted, but tore up his call-up papers and joined a secret German resistance group founded to sabotage the SS's declared intention to defend Munich until the "bitter end". Ende served the group as a courier for the remainder of the war.

In 1946, Michael Ende's grammar school re-opened, and he attended classes for a year, following which the financial support of family friends allowed him to complete his high-school education at a Waldorf School in Stuttgart. This seemingly charitable gesture was motivated by more self-interest: Ende had fallen in love with a girl three years his senior, and her parents funded his two-year stay in Stuttgart to keep the pair apart. It was at this time that he first began to write stories ("Michael," par. 3). He aspired to be a "dramatist," but wrote mostly short stories and poetry (Haase).

== Career ==
=== Early career ===
During his time in Stuttgart, Ende first encountered Expressionist and Dadaist writing and began schooling himself in literature. He studied Theodor Däubler, Yvan Goll, Else Lasker-Schüler and Alfred Mombert, but his real love was the poetry of Rainer Maria Rilke, Stefan George and Georg Trakl. He also made his first attempts at acting, performing with friends in Stuttgart's America House. He was involved in productions of Chekhov's one-act comedy "The Bear", in which he played the principal role, and in the German premiere of Jean Cocteau's Orpheus. Ende's first play "Denn die Stunde drängt (As Time is Running Out)" dates to this period. It was dedicated to Hiroshima, and was never performed.

Ende decided that he wanted to be a playwright, but financial considerations ruled out a university degree, so in 1948 he auditioned for the Otto Falckenberg School of the Performing Arts in Munich and was granted a two-year scholarship (Haase). On leaving drama school, his first job as an actor took him to a provincial theatre company in Schleswig-Holstein. The troupe travelled from town to town by bus, usually performing on makeshift stages, surrounded by beer, smoke and the clatter of skittles from nearby bowling alleys. The acting was a disappointment, he usually had to play old men and malicious schemers, and had barely enough time to memorize his lines. Despite the frustrations and disappointments of his early acting career, Ende came to value his time in the provinces as a valuable learning experience that endowed him with a practical, down-to-earth approach to his work: "It was a good experience, a healthy experience. Anyone interested in writing should be made to do that sort of thing. It doesn't have to be restricted to acting. It could be any kind of practical activity like cabinet making—learning how to construct a cabinet in which the doors fit properly." In Ende's view, practical training had the potential to be more useful than a literary degree.

Thanks to the numerous contacts of his girlfriend Ingeborg Hoffmann, Michael Ende was introduced to a variety of cabaret groups. In 1955, Therese Angeloff, head of Die kleinen Fische (the 'Little Fish' cabaret), commissioned Ende to write a piece in commemoration of the 150th anniversary of Friedrich Schiller's death. Ende produced a sketch in which a statue of Schiller was interviewed about current events, and replied with quotes from Schiller's work. "There was rapturous applause, and commissions arrived from other cabarets too." Michael Ende began to compose sketches, chansons and monologues. He also worked as a film critic during the 1950s.

=== Commercial success: writing Jim Knopf ===
In the late 1950s, Ende wrote his first novel Jim Button.

I sat down at my desk and wrote: "The country in which the engine-driver, Luke, lived was called Morrowland. It was a rather small country." Once I'd written the two lines, I hadn't a clue how the third line might go. I didn't start out with a concept or a plan—I just left myself drift from one sentence and one thought to the next. That's how I discovered that writing could be an adventure. The story carried on growing, new characters started appearing, and to my astonishment different plotlines began to weave together. The manuscript was getting longer all the time and was already much more than a picture book. I finally wrote the last sentence ten months later, and a great stack of paper had accumulated on the desk.

Michael Ende always said that ideas only came to him when the logic of the story required them. On some occasions he waited a long time for inspiration to arrive. At one point during the writing of Jim Button the plot reached a dead end. Jim and Luke were stuck among black rocks and their tank engine couldn't go any further. Ende was at a loss to think of a way out of the adventure, but cutting the episode struck him as disingenuous. Three weeks later he was about to shelve the novel when suddenly he had an idea—the steam from the tank engine could freeze and cover the rocks in snow, thus saving his characters from their scrape. "In my case, writing is primarily a question of patience," he once commented.

After nearly a year the five hundred pages of manuscript were complete. Over the next eighteen months he sent the manuscript to ten different publishers, but they all responded that it was "Unsuitable for our list" or "Too long for children". In the end he began to lose hope and toyed with the idea of throwing away the script. He eventually tried it at a small family publishing-house, K. Thienemann Verlag in Stuttgart. Michael Ende's manuscript was accepted by company director Lotte Weitbrecht who liked the story. Her only stipulation was that the manuscript had to be published as two separate books.

The first of the Jim Button novels was published in 1960. About a year later, on the morning of the announcement that his novel, Jim Button and Luke the Engine Driver, had won the German Prize for Children's Fiction, Ende was being sued by his landlady for seven months' rent back payment. With the prize money of five thousand marks, Michael Ende's financial situation improved substantially, and his writing career began in earnest. After the awards ceremony, he embarked on his first reading tour, and within a year, the first Jim Knopf book was also nominated for the Hans Christian Andersen Award and received the Berlin Literary Prize for Youth Fiction. The second Jim Knopf novel, Jim Button and the Wild Thirteen, was published in 1962. Both books were serialized on radio and TV, and the Augsburger Puppenkiste famously adapted the novels in a version filmed by Hesse's broadcasting corporation. The print-runs sold out so rapidly that K. Thienemanns could barely keep up. Translations into numerous foreign languages soon followed.

=== Writing style and themes ===
Ende claimed, "It is for this child in me, and in all of us, that I tell my stories", and that "[my books are] for any child between 80 and 8 years" (qtd. Senick 95, 97). He often expressed frustration over being perceived as a children's writer exclusively, considering that his purpose was to speak of cultural problems and spiritual wisdom to people of all ages. Especially in Germany, Ende was accused by some critics of escapism. He wrote in 1985:

One may enter the literary parlor via just about any door, be it the prison door, the madhouse door, or the brothel door. There is but one door one may not enter it through, which is the nursery door. The critics will never forgive you such. The great Rudyard Kipling is one to have suffered this. I keep wondering to myself what this peculiar contempt towards anything related to childhood is all about.

Ende's writing could be described as a surreal mixture of reality and fantasy. The reader is often invited to take a more interactive role in the story, and the worlds in his books often mirror our reality, using fantasy to bring light to the problems of an increasingly technological modern society. His writings were influenced by Rudolf Steiner and his anthroposophy. Ende was also known as a proponent of economic reform, and claimed to have had the concept of aging money, or demurrage currency, in mind when writing Momo. A theme of his work was the loss of fantasy and magic in the modern world.

=== Japan ===
Michael Ende had been fascinated by Japan since his childhood. He loved Lafcadio Hearn's Japanese legends and ghost stories, and in 1959 he wrote a play inspired by Hearn's material. Die Päonienlaterne (The Peony Lantern) was written for radio, but never broadcast. Ende was primarily interested in Japan because of its radical otherness. The Japanese language and script were so different from Ende's native German that it seemed they were grounded in a different kind of consciousness—an alternative way of seeing the world. He was particularly intrigued by the way in which everyday circumstances were shaped into intricate rituals, such as the tea ceremony. There was, he realized, a sharp contrast between the traditions of ancient Japan and its industry-oriented modern-day society.

Ende won a devoted following in Japan, and by 1993 over two million copies of Momo and The Neverending Story had been sold in Japan.

In 1986 Michael Ende was invited to attend the annual congress of the JBBY (Japanese Committee for International Children's Literature) in Tokyo. He gave a lecture on "Eternal Child-likeness"—the first detailed explanation of his artistic vision. 1989 marked the opening of the exhibition Michael and Edgar Ende in Tokyo. The exhibition was subsequently shown in Otsu, Miyazaki, Nagasaki, Osaka, Nagoya and Fukuyama. At the invitation of Shimbun, a Japanese newspaper, Michael Ende attended the opening and spent two months touring Japan. It was his third trip accompanied by the Japanese-born Mariko Sato, whom he married in September 1989. The following year an archive devoted to Michael Ende was established at Kurohime Dowakan, a museum in the Japanese city of Shinano-machi. Ende donated letters and other personal items to the collection. On 23 October 1992 Michael Ende made his final trip to Japan. In the course of their three-week visit Michael Ende and Mariko Sato-Ende visited the Dowakan museum, joined Ende's Japanese publishers, Iwanami, in celebrating the millionth sale of Momo, and travelled to Kanazawa and Hamamatsu and a number of other cities that were new to Ende.

== Personal life ==
On New Year's Eve 1952, Michael Ende met the actress Ingeborg Hoffmann during a party with friends. According to Ende, he was standing at an ivy-covered counter serving as barman, when Hoffmann strode towards him, looking "flame-haired, fiery and chic". She declaimed: "Leaning up against the ivy-covered wall / Of this old terrace"; "Mörike", Ende said instantly, recognizing the quotation. Hoffmann, eight years his senior, made a big impression on Ende. She in turn was intrigued by his literary cultivation and artistic inclinations. They began a relationship that led to their marriage in 1964 in Rome, Italy, and ended with Ingeborg Hoffmann's sudden and unexpected death in 1985 from a pulmonary embolism; she was 63 years old.

Hoffmann influenced Ende profoundly. In addition to assisting with getting his first major manuscript published, Hoffmann worked with him on his others, reading them and discussing them with him. Hoffman also influenced Ende's life in other ways. She encouraged Ende to join the Humanist Union, an organization committed to furthering humanist values. Together they campaigned for human rights, protested against West German rearmament, and worked towards peace.

For fourteen years, Ende and Hoffmann, who were both Italophiles, lived just outside Rome in Genzano, in a house they called Casa Liocorno ("The Unicorn"). It was there that Ende wrote most of the novel Momo. Following the death of his wife, Ende sold the home in Genzano and returned to Munich.

He married a second time in 1989, to a Japanese woman named Mariko Sato, and they remained married until his death. He first met Mariko Sato in 1976. Sato had emigrated from Japan to West Germany in 1974 and was working at the time for the International Youth Library in Munich. After their first meeting at the Bologna Children's Book Fair, Sato translated some of Ende's books into Japanese and helped answer his questions about Japanese culture. From 1977 to 1980 Michael Ende and Mariko Sato worked together to produce a translation into German of ten fairy tales by Japanese writer Kenji Miyazawa. The German text was never published, but their working partnership turned into a friendship. Mariko Sato accompanied him on a number of trips to Japan. The first trip took place in 1977 and included visits to Tokyo and Kyoto. For the first time Ende was able to experience Kabuki and Noh theatre, and was greatly impressed by traditional Japanese drama. Michael Ende had no children.

== Death ==
In June 1994, Ende was diagnosed with stomach cancer. Over the next few months, he underwent various treatments, but the disease progressed. He ultimately succumbed to the disease in Filderstadt, Germany, on 28 August 1995, aged 65.

== Works ==
=== Children's novels ===
Jim Button (Jim Knopf) series:

1. Jim Button and Luke the Engine Driver (Jim Knopf und Lukas der Lokomotivführer) (1960), ISBN 3-522-17650-2
  Winner of the Deutscher Jugendliteraturpreis in 1961.
2. Jim Button and the Wild 13 (Jim Knopf und die Wilde 13) (1962), ISBN 3-522-17651-0

Stand-alones:

- Momo, or The Grey Gentlemen, or The Men in Grey (Momo, or Momo oder Die seltsame Geschichte von den Zeit-Dieben und von dem Kind, das den Menschen die gestohlene Zeit zurückbrachte) (1973), ISBN 3-522-11940-1
  Winner of the Deutscher Jugendliteraturpreis in 1974.
- The Neverending Story (Die unendliche Geschichte) (1979), ISBN 3-522-17684-7
- The Night of Wishes: Or the Satanarchaeolidealcohellish Notion Potion (Der satanarchäolügenialkohöllische Wunschpunsch) (1989), ISBN 3-522-16610-8
- Rodrigo Raubein und Knirps, sein Knappe (2019), with Wieland Freund, ISBN 978-3-522-18500-4; novel initiated by Ende and developed and concluded by Freund

=== Children's short stories ===
==== All short stories ====
- "Tranquilla Trampeltrue — the Persistent Tortoise" ("Tranquilla Trampeltreu, die beharrliche Schildkröte") (1972), ISBN 3-522-41030-0
- "The Little Rag Puppet" ("Das kleine Lumpenkasperle") (1975), ISBN 3-522-43537-0
- "Lirum Larum, Willi Why" ("Lirum Larum Willi Warum") (1978), ISBN 3-87838-231-6
- "The Dream Eater" ("Das Traumfresserchen") (1978), ISBN 3-522-41500-0
- "The Lindworm and the Butterfly", or "The Strange Swap" ("Der Lindwurm und der Schmetterling oder Der seltsame Tausch") (1981), ISBN 3-522-43495-1
- "Filemon Foldrich" ("Filemon Faltenreich") (1984), ISBN 3-522-43483-8
- "Norbert Fatnoggin, or The Naked Rhinoceros" ("Norbert Nackendick oder Das nackte Nashorn") (1984), ISBN 3-522-42430-1, based on his play Die Ballade von Norbert Nackendick; oder das nackte Nashom
- "Ophelia's Shadow Theatre" ("Ophelias Schattentheater") (1988), ISBN 3-522-42520-0
- "The Story of the Bowl and the Spoon" ("Die Geschichte von der Schüssel und vom Löffel") (1990), ISBN 3-522-14870-3
- "Lenchen's Secret" ("Lenchens Geheimnis") (1991), ISBN 3-522-16690-6
- "The Long Way to Santa Cruz", or "The Long Road to Santa Cruz" ("Der lange Weg nach Santa Cruz") (1992), ISBN 3-522-16809-7
- "The Teddy Bear and the Animals" ("Der Teddy und die Tiere") (1993), ISBN 3-522-43138-3
- "A Bad Night" ("Eine schlimme Nacht") (1994)
- "A Tongue Twister Story" ("Eine Zungenbrechergeschichte") (1994)
- "Instead of a Preface; To Be Precise" ("Anstelle eines Vorworts: Genau genommen") (1994)
- "Moany Parker and Nosy-Kissy" ("Nieselpriem und Naselküss") (1994)
- "Moni Paints a Masterpiece" ("Moni malt ein Meisterwerk") (1994)
- "Never Mind" ("Macht nichts") (1994)
- "The School of Magic", or "The School of Magic in the Realm of Wishes" ("Die Zauberschule im Wünschelreich") (1994)
- "The Story of the Wish of Wishes" ("Die Geschichte vom Wunsch aller Wünsche") (1994)

==== Collections ====
- The School of Magic and Other Stories (Die Zauberschule und andere Geschichten) (1994), collection of 20 short stories:
  "Anstelle eines Vorworts: Genau genommen", "Die Zauberschule im Wünschelreich", "Tranquilla Trampeltreu, die beharrliche Schildkröte", "Das kleine Lumpenkasperle", "Lenchens Geheimnis", "Die Geschichte vom Wunsch aller Wünsche", "Norbert Nackendick oder Das nackte Nashorn", "Macht nichts", "Nieselpriem und Naselküss", "Eine Zungenbrechergeschichte", "Lirum Larum Willi Warum", "Moni malt ein Meisterwerk", "Die Geschichte von der Schüssel und vom Löffel", "Der Teddy und die Tiere", "Der lange Weg nach Santa Cruz", "Der Lindwurm und der Schmetterling oder Der seltsame Tausch", "Filemon Faltenreich", "Eine schlimme Nacht", "Das Traumfresserchen", "Ophelias Schattentheater"

=== Adult short stories ===
Collections:

- Mirror in the Mirror: A Labyrinth, or The Mirror in the Mirror: A Maze (Der Spiegel im Spiegel. Ein Labyrinth) (1984), collection of 30 short stories, ISBN 3-423-13503-4:
  "Verzeih mir, ich kann nicht lauter sprechen", "Der Sohn hatte sich unter der kundigen Anleitung", "Die Mansarde ist himmelblau", "Die Bahnhofskathedrale stand auf einer großen Scholle", "Schweres schwarzes Tuch", "Die Dame schob den schwarzen Vorhang ihres Kutschenfensters beiseite", "Der Zeuge gibt an, er habe sich auf einer nächtlichen Wiese befunden", "Der marmorbleiche Engel saß unter den Zuhörern im Gerichtssaal", "Moordunkel ist das Gesicht der Mutter", "Langsam wie ein Planet sich dreht, dreht sich der große runde Tisch", "Das Innere eines Gesichts mit geschlossenen Augen, sonst nichts", "Die Brücke, an der wir schon seit vielen Jahrhunderten bauen", "Es ist ein Zimmer und zugleich eine Wüste", "Die Hochzeitsgäste waren tanzende Flammen", "Über die weite graue Fläche des Himmels glitt ein Schlittschuhläufer dahin", "Dieses Heer besteht nur aus Buchstaben", "Eigentlich ging es um die Schafe", "Mann und Frau wollen eine Ausstellung besuchen", "Dem jungen Arzt war gestattet worden", "Nach Bureauschluss", "Der Bordellpalast auf dem Berge erstrahlte in dieser Nacht", "Der Weltreisende beschloß seine Wanderung", "An diesem Abend konnte der alte Seefahrer den ununterbrochenen Wind nicht mehr ertragen", "Unter einem schwarzen Himmel liegt ein unbewohnbares Land", "Hand in Hand gehen zwei eine Straße hinunter", "Im Klassenzimmer regnete es unaufhörlich", "Im Korridor der Schauspieler trafen wir einige hundert Wartende", "Das Feuer wurde von neuem eröffnet", "Der Zirkus brennt", "Ein Winterabend"
- The Prison of Freedom (Das Gefängnis der Freiheit) (1992), collection of 8 short stories, ISBN 3-492-24990-6:
  "Einer langen Reise Ziel", "Der Korridor des Borromeo Colmi", "Das Haus an der Peripherie", "Zugegeben etwas klein", "Die Katakomben von Misraim", "Aus den Aufzeichnungen des Traumweltreisenden Max Muto", "Das Gefängnis der Freiheit", "Die Legende vom Wegweiser"

Uncollected short stories:

- "The Legend of the Full Moon" ("Die Vollmondlegende") (1993)

=== Plays ===
- The Spoilsports, or The Fools' Inheritance (Die Spielverderber oder: Das Erbe der Narren) (1967)
- Ein sehr kurzes Märchen (1976), based on short story Hansel and Gretel
- Momo und die Zeitdiebe (1978), opera based on novel Momo
- The Entertainer's Tale (Das Gauklermärchen) (1982)
- Die Ballade von Norbert Nackendick; oder das nackte Nashom (1982)
- Die zerstreute Brillenschlange (1982)
- The Goggolori (Der Goggolori) (1984), opera
- The Hunting of the Snark (Die Jagd nach dem Schlarg) (1988), opera based on poem "The Hunting of the Snark" by Lewis Carroll
- Das Traumfresserchen (1991), opera based on short story "The Dream Eater"
- The Pied Piper (Der Rattenfänger: ein Hamelner Totentanz. Oper in elf Bildern) (1993), opera
- Die Geschichte von der Schüssel und vom Löffel (1998), opera based on short story "The Story of the Bowl and the Spoon"

=== Poems ===
- The Nonsense Book (Das Schnurpsenbuch) (1969), ISBN 3-522-12890-7
- The Shadow Sewing Machine (Die Schattennähmaschine) (1982), ISBN 3-522-12790-0
- Flea Market of Dreams: Songs to be Sung at Midnight and Quiet Ballads (Trödelmarkt der Träume: Mitternachtslieder und leise Balladen) (1986), collection of poetry and lyrics, ISBN 3-492-24798-9

=== Non-fiction ===
- Edgar Ende (1971)
- Phantasie / Kultur / Politik. Protokoll eines Gesprächs (1982), with Erhard Eppler and Hanne Tächl, ISBN 3-522-70020-1, opinion
- Archaeology of Darkness. Discussions about Art and the Work of Painter Edgar Ende (Die Archäologie der Dunkelheit. Gespräche über Kunst und das Werk des Malers Edgar Ende) (1985), with Jörg Krichbaum, ISBN 3-522-70190-9, art
- Art and Politics. A Conversation (Kunst und Politik – ein Gespräch) series (art):
  1. Kunst und Politik – ein Gespräch (1989), with Joseph Beuys, ISBN 3-928780-48-4
  2. Kunst und Politik – Gesprächsfortsetzung (2011), with Joseph Beuys, ISBN 978-3-928780-53-7
- Michael Ende's File-Card Box. Sketches and Notes (Michael Endes Zettelkasten: Skizzen und Notizen) (1994), ISBN 3-492-26356-9, collection of short stories, poems, essays, aphorisms, notes, letters, drafts, meditations and curiosities
- Monogatari no yohaku (The White Rim of a Story) – a Conversation between Michael Ende and Toshio Tamura (Monogatari no yohaku (Der weiße Rand einer Geschichte) - ein Gespräch von Michael Ende/Toshio Tamura) (2000), with Toshio Tamura, opinion, published posthumously
- The School for Louts (Die Rüpelschule) (2002), with Volker Fredrich, ISBN 3-522-43381-5, guide published posthumously
- The Big Michael Ende Reader (Das große Michael Ende Lesebuch) (2004), literature, published posthumously

== Adaptations ==
- Jim Knopf und Lukas der Lokomotivführer (1961), animated series directed by Harald Schäfer, based on children's novel Jim Button and Luke the Engine Driver
- Jim Knopf und die wilde 13 (1962), animated series directed by Harald Schäfer, based on children's novel Jim Button and the Wild 13
- Jim Knopf und Lukas, der Lokomotivführer (1970), TV movie directed by Günther Meyer-Goldenstädt and Eberhard Möbius, based on children's novel Jim Button and Luke the Engine Driver
- Jim Knopf und Lukas der Lokomotivführer (1977), animated series directed by Manfred Jenning, based on children's novel Jim Button and Luke the Engine Driver
- Jim Knopf und die wilde 13 (1978), animated series directed by Manfred Jenning, based on children's novel Jim Button and the Wild 13
- The NeverEnding Story (1984), film directed by Wolfgang Petersen, based on children's novel The Neverending Story
- Momo (1986), film directed by Johannes Schaaf, based on children's novel Momo
- The NeverEnding Story II: The Next Chapter (1990), film directed by George T. Miller, based on children's novel The Neverending Story
- The Neverending Story III: Escape from Fantasia (1994), film directed by Peter MacDonald, based on children's novel The Neverending Story
- The Neverending Story (1995-1996), animated series directed by Marc Boreal and Mike Fallows, based on children's novel The Neverending Story
- Jim Button (1999-2001), animated series directed by Bruno Bianchi, André Leduc, Jan Nonhof and Jean-Michel Spiner, based on series of children's novels Jim Button
- Wunschpunsch (2000-2002), animated series directed by Philippe Amador, based on children's novel The Night of Wishes: Or the Satanarchaeolidealcohellish Notion Potion
- Momo (2001), animated film directed by Enzo D'Alò, based on children's novel Momo
- Tales from the Neverending Story (2001-2004), series directed by Giles Walker and Adam Weissman, based on children's novel The Neverending Story
- Momo (2003), animated series directed by Cohem Burke and Colum Burke, based on children's novel Momo
- Cathedrals (2013), short documentary directed by Konrad Kästner, based on short story "The Station's Cathedral was Built on a Large Clod of Earth"
- Legend of Raana (2014), animated miniseries directed by Majid Ahmady, based on children's novel Momo
- Jim Button and Luke the Engine Driver (2018), film directed by Dennis Gansel, based on children's novel Jim Button and Luke the Engine Driver
- Jim Button and the Wild 13 (2020), film directed by Dennis Gansel, based on children's novel Jim Button and the Wild 13
- Momo (2025), film directed by Christian Ditter, based on children's novel Momo
