= The NeverEnding Story (film) =

1984 film directed by Wolfgang Petersen

- Theatrical release poster
- German: Die unendliche Geschichte
- Directed by: Wolfgang Petersen
- Screenplay by: Wolfgang Petersen; Herman Weigel
- Based on: The Neverending Story by Michael Ende
- Produced by: Bernd Eichinger; Dieter Geissler
- Starring: Noah Hathaway; Barret Oliver; Tami Stronach; Patricia Hayes; Sydney Bromley; Gerald McRaney; Moses Gunn
- Cinematography: Jost Vacano
- Edited by: Jane Seitz
- Music by: Klaus Doldinger; Giorgio Moroder
- Production companies: Neue Constantin Film; Bavaria Film; Producers Sales Organization
- Distributed by: Neue Constantin Film (West Germany); Warner Bros. (United States)
- Release dates: April 6, 1984 (West Germany); July 20, 1984 (United States)
- Running time: 94 minutes
- Countries: West Germany; United States
- Languages: English; German
- Budget: DM 60 million (~US$25–27 million)
- Box office: US$100 million

The NeverEnding Story (German: Die unendliche Geschichte) is a 1984 fantasy film, co-written and directed by Wolfgang Petersen (in his first English-language film), based on the first half of the 1979 novel The Neverending Story by Michael Ende. It was produced by Bernd Eichinger and Dieter Geissler, and stars Noah Hathaway, Barret Oliver, Tami Stronach, Patricia Hayes, Sydney Bromley, Gerald McRaney and Moses Gunn, with Alan Oppenheimer providing the voices of Falkor, Gmork, and others. It follows Bastian Balthazar Bux, a boy who finds a magical book that tells of a young warrior who is given the task of stopping the Nothing, a dark force, from engulfing the wonderland world of Fantasia.

It is the first in The NeverEnding Story film series. The second half of the book was adapted as a rough basis for the second film, The NeverEnding Story II: The Next Chapter (1990). The third film, The NeverEnding Story III (1994), has an original plot not based on the book.

== Plot ==
Bastian Balthazar Bux is a shy boy who lives with his widowed father Barney. One morning, Barney tells Bastian of his concern after hearing he daydreams in school and tells Bastian he needs to stop. On his way to school, Bastian is chased by bullies and escapes by hiding in a bookstore. He meets the owner, Carl Conrad Coreander, and Bastian's interest in books leads him to ask about the one Mr. Coreander is reading, The Neverending Story, but he advises against reading it. With his curiosity piqued, Bastian secretly takes the book. Arriving at school late, Bastian hides in the building's attic to read.

The book describes the world of Fantasia, a fantasy realm that is slowly being destroyed by a malevolent force called "The Nothing". Messengers are heading to the Ivory Tower to seek help from the Childlike Empress. To their dismay, they learn that she has fallen ill. The young warrior Atreyu is tasked with discovering a cure for her illness in order to save Fantasia. Atreyu is given an amulet called Auryn that can guide and protect him in the quest. As Atreyu sets out, a wolf-like being named Gmork is sent to kill him.

Atreyu's quest leads him to seek the advice of Morla, the Ancient One, in the Swamps of Sadness. While making their way through the swamp, Atreyu's horse Artax is overcome by the sadness and sinks into the swamp, leaving Atreyu to continue alone. Morla, weary and indifferent, being a prisoner in the swamp, directs Atreyu to the Southern Oracle, ten thousand miles distant instead of helping him directly. Gmork closes in as an exhausted Atreyu begins to sink into the swamp before being saved by the Luck Dragon Falkor, who takes him to the home of Urgl and Engywook, two gnomes who live near the gates to the Southern Oracle. Atreyu just manages to make it through the first deadly gate but at the second gate, a mirror reveals an image of Bastian reading the book. Atreyu eventually meets the Southern Oracle, who tells him that the only way to save the Empress is to find a human child who lives beyond the boundaries of Fantasia to give her a new name.

In flight, Atreyu is knocked from Falkor's back by the Nothing, losing the Auryn in the process. He wakes on the shore of some abandoned ancient ruins, where he finds several murals depicting his adventure, including one of Gmork, who explains that Fantasia represents humanity's imagination and is thus without boundaries, while the Nothing is a manifestation of the loss of hopes and dreams. Gmork lunges at Atreyu who slays him with an improvised weapon as the Nothing begins consuming the ruins.

Falkor manages to retrieve Auryn and rescue Atreyu. Later only small fragments of Fantasia remain in a starry void. Fearing that they have failed, they come upon the Ivory Tower intact. Inside, Atreyu reports he failed the Empress, but she assures him that he has succeeded and brought to her a human child who has been following his quest. She explains that Bastian has been following Atreyu's adventures and they have followed Bastian throughout the film. He has become a part of the story they are all sharing in. As the Nothing begins to destroy the Tower, Atreyu is knocked unconscious. The Empress pleads with Bastian to call out her new name in order to save Fantasia. Filled with doubt, Bastian declines to believe any of it could be happening. After she implores him directly to call out her new name, he runs to the window of the attic and calls out her new name: "Moonchild".

The Empress presents Bastian with a grain of sand, the last remnant of Fantasia. The Empress tells him that he has the power to bring Fantasia back with his imagination. Bastian re-creates Fantasia and flies on Falkor's back to see the land and its inhabitants restored, including Atreyu and Artax. When Falkor asks what his next wish will be, Bastian brings Falkor to the real world to chase down the school bullies. The film narrates that Bastian had many more wishes and adventures before returning to the ordinary world but that is another story.

== Cast ==
- Barret Oliver as Bastian Balthazar Bux
- Noah Hathaway as Atreyu
- Tami Stronach as Childlike Empress, to whom Bastian gives the new name "Moon Child"
- Patricia Hayes as Urgl, Engywook's wife and a healer
- Sydney Bromley as Engywook, Urgl's husband and a scientist
- Gerald McRaney as Bastian's father.
- Moses Gunn as Cairon, a servant of the Empress
- Alan Oppenheimer as the voices of Falkor, Gmork, Rockbiter, and the Narrator (the latter three are uncredited)
- Thomas Hill as Carl Conrad Coreander, a bookseller
- Deep Roy as Teeny Weeny, a messenger riding on a racing snail
- Tilo Prückner as Night Hob, a messenger riding a narcoleptic hang-glider bat
- Darryl Cooksey, Drum Garrett, and Nicholas Gilbert as Ethan, Todd, and Lucas, three bullies who torment Bastian
- Robert Easton as the voice of Morla (uncredited)

== Production ==
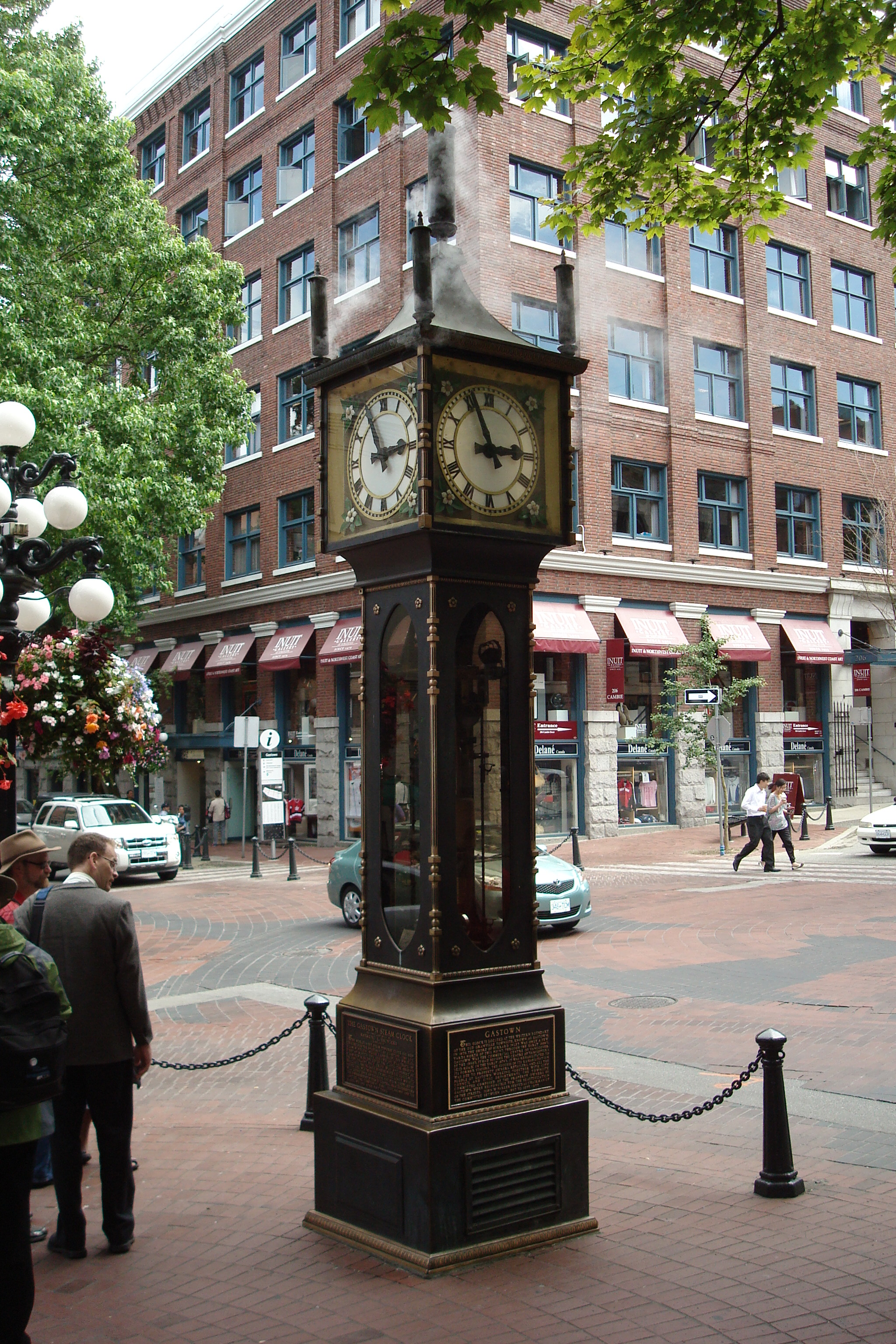
Steam clock on Water Street in Vancouver, the street where Bastian was chased by the bullies during the film

Author Michael Ende was initially happy about his book being turned into a film. Ende worked with Wolfgang Petersen as a script advisor and was paid $50,000 for the rights to his book. Ende claimed that Petersen later rewrote the script without consulting him, and that this adaptation deviated so far from his book that he requested that production either be halted or the film's title be changed. When the producers did neither, he sued them and subsequently lost the case. Ende called the film a "gigantic melodrama of kitsch, commerce, plush, and plastic". The film only covers the first half of the book, cutting off in the middle of chapter XIII and tacking on an ending that betrays the pre-established logic of having crossed the boundaries with Falkor and having chased the bullies into a trash bin. Helmut Dietl was originally attached to direct the film, but later dropped out and was replaced with Wolfgang Petersen.

German producer Bernd Eichinger had seen his children read the book, and they urged him to make a film out of it. He was reluctant, but eventually agreed to do so, joining Dieter Geissler, who held the rights, to have the book made into a film. The bulk of the film was shot at Bavaria Studios in Munich, with the street scenes and the school interior in the real world shot in Vancouver, Canada (the Gastown Vancouver Steam Clock is in the scene where the three bullies are chased down Cambie Street past the steam clock at the intersection of Water Street and then on down Blood Alley), and the beach where Atreyu (Noah Hathaway) falls, which was filmed at Playa de Mónsul in San José, Almería, Spain.

The film had a budget of 60 million Deutsche Mark, reputedly the most expensive film made by a European studio at the time.

== Music ==
The film score of The NeverEnding Story was composed by Klaus Doldinger of the German jazz group Passport. The theme song of the English version of the film was composed by Giorgio Moroder, with lyrics by Keith Forsey, and performed by Christopher "Limahl" Hamill, once the lead singer of Kajagoogoo, and Beth Andersen. Released as a single in 1984, it peaked at No. 4 on the UK singles chart, No. 6 on the US Billboard Adult Contemporary chart, and No. 17 on the Billboard Hot 100. The song has been covered by Armonite, The Birthday Massacre, Creamy, Dragonland, Kenji Haga, New Found Glory, Echo Image and Scooter. This Limahl song, along with other "techno-pop" treatments to the soundtrack, is not present in the German version of the film, which features Doldinger's orchestral score exclusively. An official soundtrack album was released featuring Doldinger's score and Moroder's theme tune. Moroder also rescored several scenes for the version released outside Germany. The track listing (Doldinger is responsible for everything from track 6 onwards) is as follows:

The NeverEnding Story (Original Motion Picture Soundtrack)
No.	Title	Length
1.	"The NeverEnding Story"	3:31
2.	"Swamps of Sadness"	1:57
3.	"Ivory Tower"	3:10
4.	"Ruined Landscape"	3:03
5.	"Sleepy Dragon"	3:59
6.	"Bastian's Happy Flight"	3:16
7.	"Fantasia"	0:56
8.	"Atreyu's Quest"	2:52
9.	"Theme of Sadness"	2:43
10.	"Atreyu Meets Falkor"	2:31
11.	"Mirror Gate – Southern Oracle"	3:10
12.	"Gmork"	0:29
13.	"Moon Child"	1:24
14.	"AURYN"	2:20
15.	"Happy Flight"	1:21

In Germany, an album featuring Doldinger's score was released.

Die Unendliche Geschichte — Das Album
No.	Title	Length
1.	"Flug auf dem Glücksdrachen (Flight of the Luckdragon)"	3:12
2.	"Die Unendliche Geschichte (Titelmusik) (The NeverEnding Story (Main Title))"	2:44
3.	"Im Haulewald (In the Howling Forest)"	3:01
4.	"Der Elfenbeinturm (The Ivory Tower)"	1:54
5.	"Atréjus Berufung – AURYN Thema (Atreyu's Quest – AURYN Theme)"	2:47
6.	"Phantásien (Fantasia)"	0:52
7.	"Artax's Tod (The Death of Artax)"	1:13
8.	"Die Sümpfe der Traurigkeit (The Swamps of Sadness)"	2:39
9.	"Atréju's Flug (Atreyu's Flight)"	2:27
10.	"Die uralte Morla (Morla, the Ancient One)"	2:27
11.	"Das südliche Orakel (The Southern Oracle)"	3:19
12.	"Die drei magischen Tore (The Three Magic Gates)"	3:25
13.	"Spukstadt (Spook City)"	1:37
14.	"Flug zum Elfenbeinturm (Flight to the Ivory Tower)"	3:02
15.	"Mondenkind (Moon Child)"	1:19
16.	"Die kindliche Kaiserin (The Childlike Empress)"	2:16
17.	"Flug auf dem Glücksdrachen (Schlußtitel) (Flight of the Luckdragon (End Title))"	1:19

=== Charts ===
Chart (1985)	Peak position
Australia (Kent Music Report)	69

Chart (2025)	Peak position
Hungarian Physical Albums (MAHASZ)	17

== Release ==
The NeverEnding Story was released on 6 April 1984 in West Germany (Die unendliche Geschichte), and on 20 July in the United States.

=== Box office ===
The film performed very well at the box office, grossing US$100 million worldwide against a production budget of DM 60 million (approximately US$25–27 million at the time). Almost 5 million people visited theatres to see it in Germany, a number rarely achieved by German productions, resulting in a gross of about US$20 million, making it the highest-grossing German film at the time. It grossed a similar amount in the United States—only a modest sum in the American market, which director Wolfgang Petersen ascribed to the film's European sensibilities.

=== Critical reception ===
The film has a Rotten Tomatoes score of 84% based on reviews from 49 critics, with an average rating of 7/10. The site's critical consensus reads: "A magical journey about the power of a young boy's imagination to save a dying fantasy land, The NeverEnding Story remains a much-loved kids [sic] adventure." Metacritic gives the film a score of 49 out of 100 based on reviews from 11 critics, indicating "mixed or average reviews".

Roger Ebert of the Chicago Sun-Times gave it 3 out of 4 stars and praised its visual effects, saying that "an entirely new world has been created" because of them, a comment echoed by Variety. Ebert's co-host Gene Siskel said that the special effects and art direction were cheap-looking and that Falkor the luckdragon resembled a cheap toy. He also referred to Noah Hathaway as a "dullard" and said that the film was "much too long". Ebert pointed out that the film was only 90 minutes. Joshua Tyler of CinemaBlend called the film one of a few true masterpieces in the fantasy genre.

Vincent Canby panned the film as a "graceless, humorless fantasy for children" in a 1984 review in The New York Times. Canby's criticism charged that parts of the film sounded like The Pre-Teenager's Guide to Existentialism. He further criticized the "tacky" special effects and that the construction of the dragon looked like an impractical bathmat. Colin Greenland reviewed The NeverEnding Story for Imagine magazine and thought that the film and its story were clumsily edited.

=== Accolades ===
Wins:

- 1984 – Bambi Award for National Film
- 1984 – Goldene Leinwand (Golden Screen Award)
- 1985 – Saturn Award for Best Performance by a Younger Actor (Noah Hathaway)
- 1985 – Bavarian Film Awards for Best Production (Produzentenpreis): Bernd Eichinger, Dieter Geissler and Günter Rohrbach
- 1985 – Film Award in Gold for Best Production Design

Nominations:

- 1985 – Saturn Award for Best Fantasy Film and Saturn Award for Best Music
- 1985 – International Fantasy Film Award for Best Film
- 1985 – Young Artist Award for Best Family Motion Picture, Best Young Actor, Best Young Supporting Actress

== Home media ==
=== LaserDisc ===
The NeverEnding Story was released by Warner Home Video on LaserDisc with a digital stereo soundtrack in 1985. A widescreen LaserDisc was released on 28 August 1991; no special features were included.

=== DVD ===
The region-1 DVD was first released in 2001 by Warner Home Video, containing only the North American release of the film. The only audio option is a 2.0 stereo mix in either English or Spanish. The theatrical trailer is the lone extra feature presented. There is also a lavish 2003 European version, which is a two-disc special edition with packaging shaped like the book from the film, and containing both the North American and German releases of the film. Various extras, such as a 45-minute documentary, a music video and galleries, are presented on the second disc.

There is no English audio for the German version of the film. This edition has gone out of print. The standard single-disc edition is also available for the region-2 market. A Dutch import has also appeared on the Internet in various places, which not only contains the North American release of the film, but also includes a remastered DTS surround sound track, which is not found in either the German or the region-1 releases. In 2008, Czech- and Slovak-language DVD versions appeared in the Czech Republic and Slovakia.

=== Blu-ray ===
The first Blu-ray release is a region-free Dutch edition on 24 March 2007. Warner Home Video released a region-A Blu-ray edition of the film in March 2010. The disc includes a lossless DTS-HD Master Audio 5.1 surround track, which marks the first time a 5.1 surround track has been included in a US home-video version of the film. No special features or theatrical trailer are included. German releases feature the original Klaus Doldinger soundtrack with the original English audio track.

A 30th Anniversary Edition Blu-ray was released in October 2014, which duplicates the DTS surround track of its predecessor. Originally described as a "newly" remastered version of the film, Warner released a statement indicating that "the only remastered version is The NeverEnding Story II", while not elaborating further on this current US release. The 30th Anniversary Edition contains the original theatrical trailer, a commentary track by director Wolfgang Petersen, documentaries and interviews from both 1984 and 2014, and a German-language/English-subtitled feature detailing the digital restoration process of the film.

=== 4K Ultra HD Blu-ray ===
A 4K version of the German international cut of the film was released in Germany in July 2021. A 40th anniversary 5-disc deluxe edition with the original US theatrical version restored from the original negative, the extended German version, and new special features including the feature-length Life After Neverending Story documentary (housed in a replica of the book from the film along with replicas of original promotional material) was released in Australia in December 2024 by the home media company Via Vision Entertainment, via its sublabel Imprint.

== In popular culture ==
- In fourth season The Simpsons episode "New Kid on the Block", Lionel Hutz (Phil Hartman) claims to have filed a suit against the film for fraudulent advertising.
- A season 4 episode of Family Guy used a cutaway gag in the episode "Breaking Out Is Hard to Do" in which Brian Griffin (Seth MacFarlane)'s concern about Lois (Alex Borstein) being obsessed with shoplifting reminds Peter (MacFarlane) of being obsessed with riding Falkor (Paul Ganus). In the cutaway, Falkor complains about Peter's weight.
- In The Venture Bros. episode "Showdown at Cremation Creek (Part II)", Dean Venture (Michael Sinterniklaas)'s hallucination in the engine room is based on the film.
- Korn's 2019 album The Nothing is named directly in reference to the Nothing in the film. Korn frontman Jonathan Davis chose the title as he was still struggling with the death of his estranged wife Deven Davis.
- In 2019, the theme song for the film was incorporated into the final episode of the third season of the science fiction thriller show Stranger Things, which takes place in 1985. After the episode was released, Spotify streams for the song increased by 400 percent.

== Possible remake ==
In 2009, Warner Bros., The Kennedy/Marshall Company and Leonardo DiCaprio's Appian Way Productions were in the early stages of creating another adaptation of Ende's novel. They intended to "examine the more nuanced details of the book" rather than remake the original film by Petersen. In 2011, producer Kathleen Kennedy said that problems securing the rights to the story may mean that a second adaptation is "not meant to be". In 2022, a bidding war for the film and TV rights of The NeverEnding Story between studios and streamers had emerged. In 2024, Michael Ende Productions, in association with See-Saw Films, announced plans for a series of films based on the book.
