= The NeverEnding Story II: The Next Chapter =

1990 fantasy film

The Neverending Story II
- International theatrical release poster by Renato Casaro
- Directed by: George T. Miller
- Screenplay by: Karin Howard
- Based on: The Neverending Story by Michael Ende
- Produced by: Dieter Geissler
- Starring: Jonathan Brandis; Kenny Morrison; Clarissa Burt; John Wesley Shipp; Martin Umbach
- Cinematography: David Connell
- Edited by: Chris Blunden; Peter Hollywood
- Music by: Robert Folk
- Production company: CineVox Filmproduktion
- Distributed by: Warner Bros. (Note: Co-distributed with CineVox Film GmbH in Germany.)
- Release dates: October 25, 1990 (Germany); February 8, 1991 (United States)
- Running time: 90 minutes
- Countries: Germany; United States
- Languages: English; German
- Budget: $35 million
- Box office: ~$32 million

The NeverEnding Story II: The Next Chapter is a 1990 fantasy film and a sequel to The NeverEnding Story. It was directed by George T. Miller and stars Jonathan Brandis as Bastian Bux, Kenny Morrison as Atreyu and Alexandra Johnes as the Childlike Empress. The only actor to return from the first film was Thomas Hill as Carl Conrad Coreander. The film used plot elements from Michael Ende's novel The Neverending Story (primarily the second half) but introduced a new storyline.

Upon its U.S. theatrical release in 1991, the Bugs Bunny cartoon Box-Office Bunny, directed by Darrell Van Citters, was shown before the film. The short was also included on both the VHS and LaserDisc releases of the film.

== Plot ==
12-year-old Bastian Balthazar Bux seeks to join his school's swimming team, but his ability to jump off a diving board is marred by his fear of heights. He revisits Carl Conrad Coreander's antiquarian bookstore to seek advice on courage, where he rediscovers The Neverending Story and hears the Childlike Empress call out to him for aid.

Bastian takes the book home while the Auryn amulet magically comes off the book cover, which Bastian takes and is summoned to Fantasia, where he meets a bird-like creature named Nimbly and is reunited with Atreyu in the beautiful Silver City. After the group encounters and escapes from armored giants, Bastian comes to understand that a force called the "Emptiness" is spreading across Fantasia. This force has been brought about by the evil sorceress Xayide, who seeks to seize power over Fantasia. To hinder Bastian's quest, Xayide's inventor Tri-Face develops an apparatus that strips Bastian of a memory each time he uses the Auryn amulet to make a wish. Nimbly was sent as a spy to persuade Bastian to make wishes until he is unable to remember why he came to Fantasia.

Bastian and Atreyu seek out and capture Xayide. She seems to abandon her quest for power and agrees to lead the two to the Childlike Empress. During the travel to the Empress's Ivory Tower, Xayide tricks Bastian into believing that his friends will turn against him and manages to get him to wish for a series of ridiculous wishes. It also becomes obvious to Atreyu that they are being led aimlessly.

Meanwhile, Bastian's father Barney has noticed his son's disappearance. He finds The Neverending Story in Bastian's room and sees a sticker on the front cover listing the bookstore's address. Barney rushes to confront Mr. Coreander, who simply tells him that he will find the answers to his son's whereabouts inside the book. Returning later with a police officer, Barney is shocked to see the bookstore abandoned. Eventually, Barney reads the book and is surprised to see his son's exploits in Fantasia being written by the book itself and that he is mentioned within.

Atreyu determines what Xayide is planning, while Bastian is fully persuaded that Atreyu has turned on him. In a struggle between the two, Atreyu is knocked over a cliff and falls to his death. Returning to Xayide, Bastian discovers the apparatus for himself and learns that he only has two memories left, consisting of his mother and father.

Bastian returns to the ruins of Silver City and uses his penultimate memory of his mother to wish Atreyu back to life. Xayide tries to force Bastian to use his last wish to return home. Bastian agrees to make his last wish, but instead wishes for the sorceress "to have a heart". This fills Xayide with emotion, negating the Emptiness within her and which she controls. Overcome with compassion, Xayide explodes in a blast of light, and Fantasia is restored, along with Bastian's memories.

Having been freed, the Childlike Empress thanks Bastian for his help, and Bastian gives her the Auryn amulet. She shows him the way home: a cliff overlooking a waterfall, to help Bastian overcome his fear of heights. Encouraged by Barney and Atreyu, Bastian jumps off and returns home safely to reunite with his father, while the Auryn amulet magically goes back onto the book cover.

== Cast ==
- Jonathan Brandis as Bastian Balthazar Bux
  - J. Michael Haney as Young Bastian Bux
- Kenny Morrison as Atreyu
- Clarissa Burt as Xayide
- John Wesley Shipp as Barney Bux
- Alexandra Johnes as Childlike Empress
- Thomas Hill as Carl Conrad Coreander
- Martin Umbach as Nimbly
- Christopher Burton as Tri-Face
- Helena Michell as Mrs. Bux
- Donald Arthur as Falkor (uncredited voice)
- Dan Fincher as Rockbiter (uncredited voice)

== Production ==
Producer Dieter Geissler declared that he always intended to make a trilogy out of Michael Ende's The Neverending Story, finding the book "just too rich to leave" at one film, but his plans to follow the original film, which only covers half of the novel, were postponed as Ende sued Geissler and the production company, insisting that he have a say in any future film treatments of his work. In a 1997 promotional interview for the film's sequel, The NeverEnding Story III, producer Tim Hampton stated that the crew had to allow Ende to review their produced work.

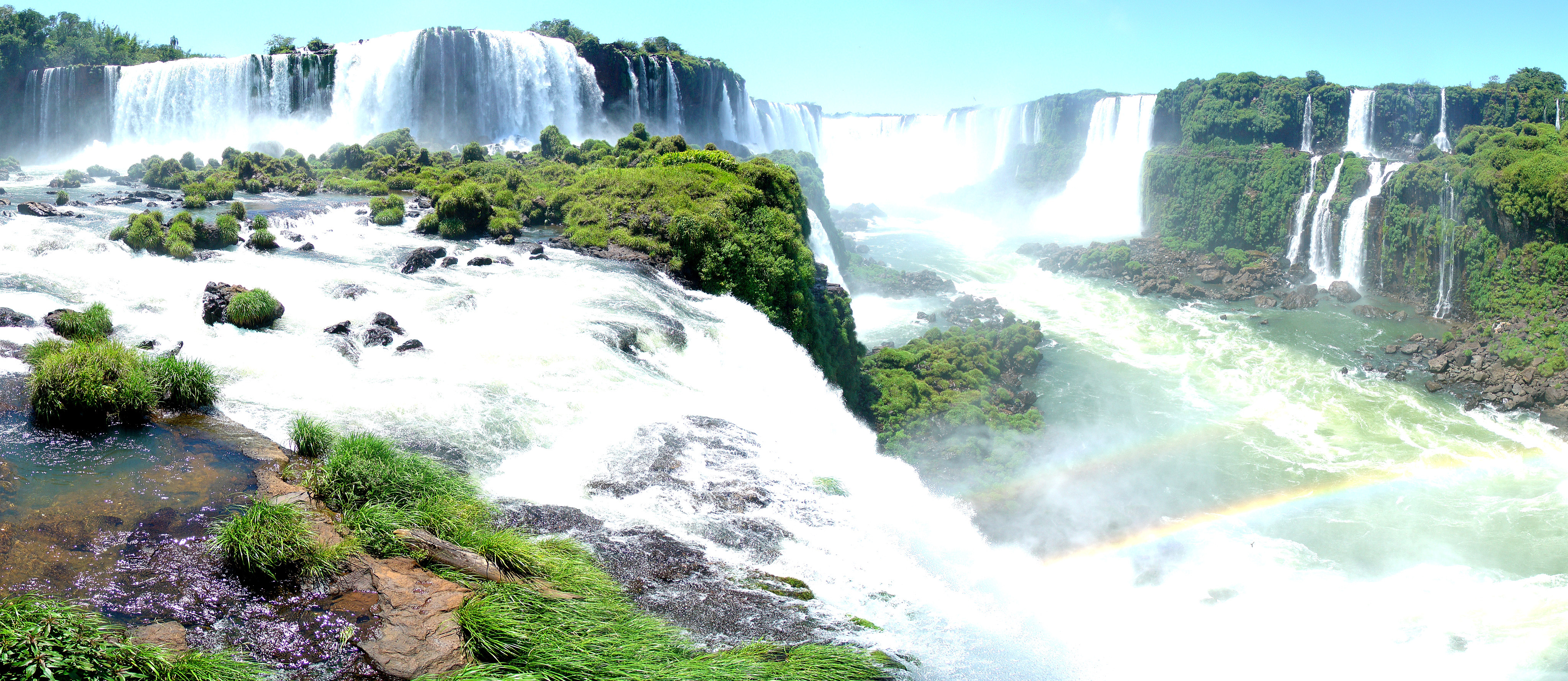
Iguazu Falls, Argentina, the waterfall where Bastian dives returning to his human world.

As soon as the legal problems were solved, Geissler started a year-long pre-production working with conceptual artist Ludwig Angerer, to ensure the film's design and technical ambitions would fit into a lower budget, along with averting the problems the first film faced with its effects. Geissler also hired screenwriter Karin Howard, who contributed 14 drafts until the final screenplay, which draws inspiration from most chapters in the second half of Ende's novel.

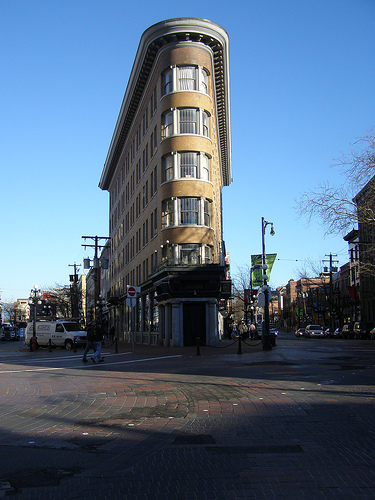
Hotel Europe, the building where Mr. Koreander's bookstore is located that appears too in the first film.

Geissler opted to invite a director only when the development was finished, as he considered effects-heavy productions too demanding for a director when working on the project from the earliest pre-production stages. He eventually brought in the Australian George T. Miller, who was a fan of the original film.

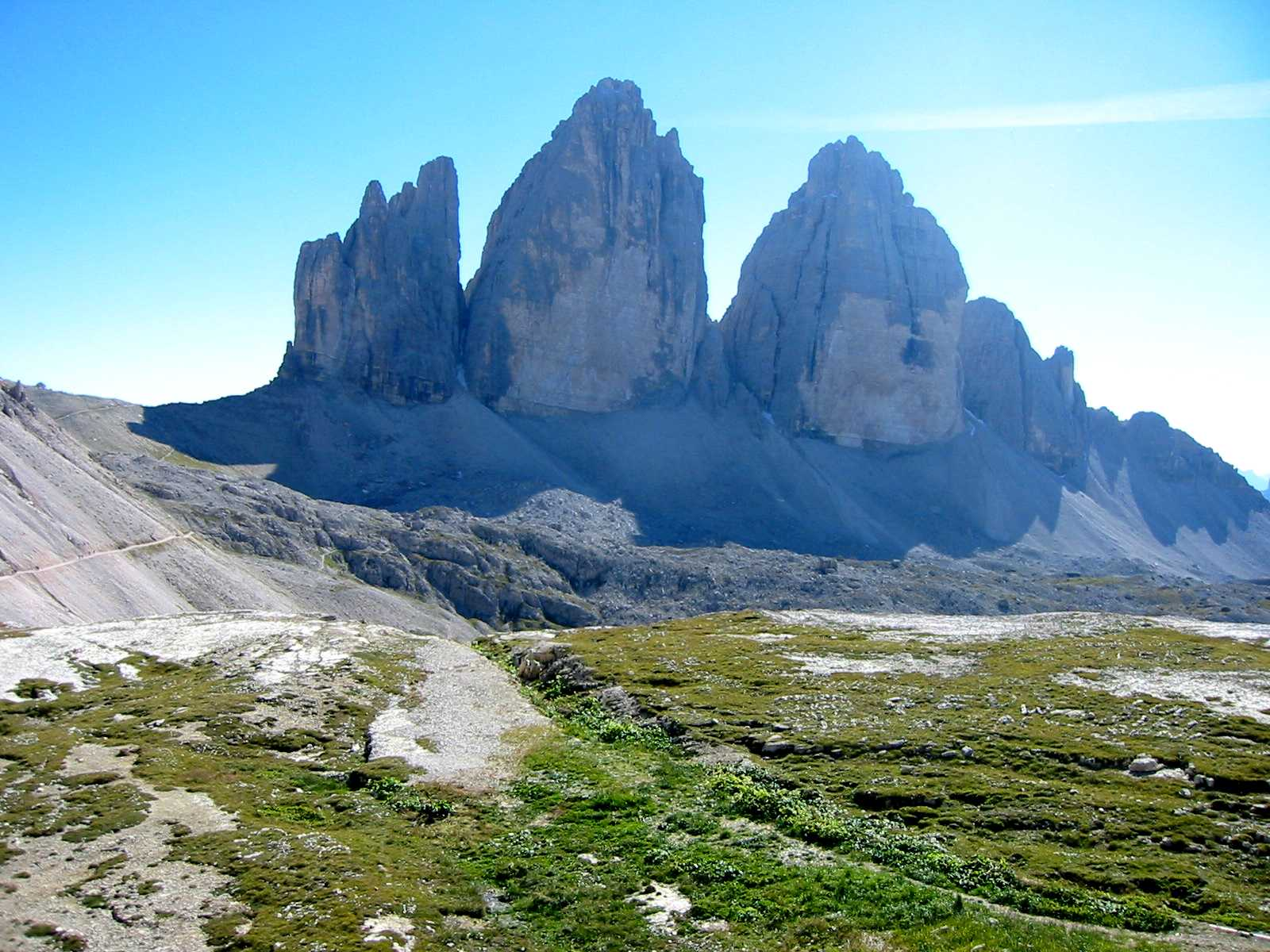
Dolomites, Italy, the mountain where Bastian and Falkor fly following a dragon.

Over 600 children were auditioned, given the original actors were now too old for their roles. In contrast to The NeverEnding Story relying on blue screen and scale model creatures, The Next Chapter would have more life-sized model work and matte paintings.

Principal photography began in early 1990 at Bavaria Film near Munich. The original plan was to build three separate stages, having first and second unit shooting simultaneously on the first two-stage and have the effects done on the third. The studio decided not to build the third stage at the last minute, forcing production to shoot first and second unit on the same stage at the same time, the stage being Stage 7 at Bavaria Studios.

As labour rules regarding child actors limited their working schedules, Miller decided to only rehearse scenes once before filming, and maximized the time with the children on set by shooting with as many as three cameras on every scene. This created a problem as Miller's fear of falling late wound up making the film so ahead of schedule the effects team had not completed the necessary work for later scenes.

== Soundtrack ==
The Neverending Story II - The Next Chapter: Original Soundtrack

Soundtrack album by Giorgio Moroder & Robert Folk
- Released: 1990
- Genres: Score, pop
- Length: 45:53
- Label: WEA

No.	Title	Writer(s)	Performer(s)	Length
1.	"Searching For Fantasia"	Robert Folk	Robert Folk	2:19
2.	"Dreams We Dream"	Giorgio Moroder, Tom Whitlock	Joe Milner	4:23
3.	"Heaven's Just A Heartbeat"	Moroder, Whitlock	Joe Milner	4:10
4.	"The Neverending Story"	Moroder, Keith Forsey	Joe Milner	3:29
5.	"Dreams We Dream (Instrumental)"	Moroder, Whitlock	Giorgio Moroder	4:27
6.	"Bastian's Dream"	Folk	Robert Folk	2:05
7.	"Falkor's Quest"	Folk	Robert Folk	2:33
8.	"Flight Of The Dragon"	Folk	Robert Folk	3:32
9.	"Silver Mountains"	Folk	Robert Folk	1:29
10.	"Morning In Fantasia"	Folk	Robert Folk	1:08
11.	"The Childlike Empress"	Folk	Robert Folk	2:15
12.	"The Giants' Attack"	Folk	Robert Folk	2:11
13.	"Silver Lake"	Folk	Robert Folk	2:54
14.	"Xayide's Castle"	Folk	Robert Folk	1:26
15.	"Atreyu's Return To The Great Plains"	Folk	Robert Folk	3:10
16.	"Bastian's Lost Memories"	Folk	Robert Folk	1:03
17.	"Silver City"	Folk	Robert Folk	2:05
18.	"The Neverending Story (Reprise)"	Moroder, Forsey	Giorgio Moroder	0:54
Total length:				45:53

== Reception ==
The NeverEnding Story II: The Next Chapter has a 14% score on Rotten Tomatoes based on 7 reviews; the average critics' rating is 3.7/10. On Metacritic, the film has a weighted average score of 30 out of 100 based on 13 critic reviews, indicating "generally unfavorable reviews". Richard Harrington of The Washington Post was critical to its plot and special effects, and commented that several new creatures came from the late-night comedy sketches. Chris Hicks, writing for the Deseret News, was kinder in his review, writing that it would be enjoyable to children, whereas the first film was enjoyable to the entire family. Common Sense Media gave a rating of 3 out of 5 stars; although calling the special effects "dated", they thought that the cleverness of a story that keeps changing as its characters and circumstances require will draw younger viewers to the film. They also noted that the film has similarities to The Wizard of Oz.

In its opening in Germany on 412 screens, it was the number one film for the week with a gross of 5.6 million Deutsche Mark ($3.8 million) from more than 800,000 admissions. The opening was the biggest ever for Warner Bros. Pictures in Germany. It opened at the same time in Austria and French-speaking Switzerland, where it also opened well. It eventually had 3,231,527 admissions in Germany, giving it the seventh-highest attendance of the year and making it one of the two German films to achieve domestic success in 1990, along with Werner – Beinhart! The film grossed $17,373,527 in the United States and Canada.
