= Producers Sales Organization =

Motion picture production and distribution company

PSO Productions, Inc.
- Formerly: Producers Sales Organization
- Founded: 1977; 49 years ago
- Founder: Mark Damon
- Defunct: 1986
- Fate: Bankrupt
- Successor: Vision International; Vestron Pictures; Library: John and Kate Hyde (ownership)
- Headquarters: United States

Producers Sales Organization (PSO; also known as PSO Productions, Inc.) was an independent motion picture production and sales company founded in 1977. Initiated by Mark Damon, an actor-turned-producer, PSO mostly handled foreign sales of independent films. It was initially a partnership between Damon, producer Sandy Howard, and Richard St. Johns, who worked for Arthur Guinness Son & Co. At one point, it was a subsidiary of Guinness.

In its final years of existence, PSO briefly became a full-fledged production company, setting up operations on March 27, 1984, through subsidiary PSO Presentations.

In April 1984, a major shake-up happened in the sales and acquisition department and executive Eleanor Powell moved position to become deputy managing director of the company. That November, PSO merged with film financing firm The Delphi Companies; the resulting company, PSO-Delphi, forged a domestic theatrical distribution deal with TriStar Pictures and a home video distribution deal with CBS/Fox Video.

Throughout 1984–85, the company made several more deals with other production and distribution companies, including Frank Yablans, Roadshow Film Distributors, UGC, and Taft Entertainment/Keith Barish Pictures. Despite releasing many successful films, PSO ran into financial problems and was forced into bankruptcy in 1986, effectively ending the company (the Taft-Barish pictures planned by PSO would eventually move to J&M Entertainment). In a lead-up to a bankruptcy plan, PSO decided to drop in-house production and restructure their output deals with foreign distributors into picture-by-picture agreements, including a deal with RKO Pictures.

The company was forced out of film production when they cut their relationship with Delphi in April 1986. PSO agreed on a new line of credit with Chemical Bank of New York and The First National Bank of Boston on the condition that the company had to concentrate on what it did originally, acquire foreign sales rights to pictures and sell those films abroad. As the company had gone into bankruptcy protection, Vestron Inc. was rumored to buy PSO, but the company ultimately shut down outright. Many of its employees were soon hired by Vestron to run a new foreign sales unit dubbed Producers Distribution Organization, later renamed Interaccess Film Distribution, Inc., and then to the Vestron International Group.

A year after PSO ended, Damon founded a new company, with Peter Guber and Jon Peters, called Vision International.

PSO's chief executive John Hyde and his wife Kate currently own Producers Sales Organization's assets, while distribution rights to PSO's films are held by several different companies.

PSO's founder Mark Damon died of natural causes in Los Angeles on May 12, 2024, at the age of 91, with his wife, actress Margaret Markov, and two children by his side.

== Films ==
Among the most notable films PSO represented or financed include:

- Matilda (1978)
- The Wanderers (1979)
- A Change of Seasons (1980)
- Little Lord Fauntleroy (1980)
- The Final Countdown (1981)
- Das Boot (1981)
- An American Werewolf in London (1981)
- Dead and Buried (1981)
- Endless Love (1981)
- Young Doctors in Love (1982)
- Heidi's Song (1982)
- Cujo (1983)
- The Day After (1983)
- Fire and Ice (1983)
- Never Say Never Again (1983)
- The Outsiders (1983)
- Silkwood (1983)
- La Traviata (1983)
- The Adventures of Buckaroo Banzai Across the 8th Dimension (1984)
- The Defective Detective (1984)
- The NeverEnding Story (1984)
- Once Upon a Time in America (1984)
- Prizzi's Honor (1985)
- Heavenly Bodies (1985)
- The Clan of the Cave Bear (1986)
- 8 Million Ways to Die (1986)
- 9½ Weeks (1986)
- Short Circuit (1986)
- Flight of the Navigator (1986)
