= Tim Hampton (producer) =

British film producer and studio executive

- Born: 25 February 1948; Bergkirchen, Bavaria, Germany
- Died: 11 March 2013 (aged 65); London, England, U.K.
- Occupations: Film producer, studio executive
- Spouse(s): Sally Hampton (divorced); Anna Hampton (?-his death)
- Children: 3

Tim Hampton (25 February 1948 – 11 March 2013) was a British film producer and studio executive. From 1979 to 1983, he was the European production executive and managing director at 20th Century Fox Productions.

== Personal life and death ==
Hampton attended Bishop Wordsworth's School and resided in Farnham.

Through his marriage to Sally Hampton, he was the father of three sons: Matthew, Piers and Tom. At the time of his death, Hampton was married to Anna Hampton.

Hampton died on 11 March 2013, at the age of 65.

== Filmography ==
Year	Film	Notes
1973	Charley One-Eye	Associate producer
1978	The Hound of the Baskervilles	Associate producer
1979	Monty Python's Life of Brian	Associate producer
1985	Legend	Co-producer
1988	Frantic	Producer
1989	A Dry White Season	Executive producer
1990	The NeverEnding Story II: The Next Chapter	Executive producer
1994	The NeverEnding Story III	Producer
1996	The Adventures of Pinocchio	Co-producer
1998	Lost in Space	Co-producer
