= Peter MacDonald (director) =

English filmmaker (born 1939)

- Born: 20 June 1939 (age 87); Willesden, London, England
- Occupations: Film director; Cinematographer; Film producer
- Years active: 1957–present

Peter MacDonald (born 20 June 1939) is an English film director, cinematographer, and producer from London, England. A prolific second unit director, MacDonald has worked on various Hollywood blockbusters including Guardians of the Galaxy, The Bourne Ultimatum, Harry Potter and the Prisoner of Azkaban, and The Empire Strikes Back, and made his directorial debut with Rambo III.

== Career ==
Starting his career in the camera department, MacDonald subsequently spent 10 years as camera operator for cinematographer Geoffrey Unsworth, working on films including Superman, The Return of the Pink Panther, Murder on the Orient Express and Cabaret. After Unsworth's death in 1978, MacDonald increasingly worked as a second unit director, and as a cinematographer himself.

MacDonald's debut as director, Rambo III, came about at extremely short notice. "I started it without any preparation", he explained in an interview, "because Russell Mulcahy [Rambo III's original director] left after two weeks, so I came into it totally ill-prepared – I was directing the second unit on the film. Literally the day before I left America to start Rambo III I'd finished photographing a film, Shag, in America; came to Israel, thinking I was going to do a second unit which I could slowly get into, and within a week or two I was directing one of the most expensive films ever made." MacDonald has since directed other productions including The NeverEnding Story III, Legionnaire and the television mini-series The Monkey King (also known as The Lost Empire). In 2016, MacDonald was hired to direct reshoots during post-production on Rogue One: A Star Wars Story.

MacDonald currently works most frequently as a second unit director. He has said about this role, "The most important thing about any second unit is that you can't tell the difference between the second unit and the first unit. It must have the stamp of the first unit, both in photography and the style of direction. That's why, when I do second unit, I always photograph and direct, so you try and copy what the first unit does as much as possible. You mustn't be on an ego trip and try and do your own style, because your material has to cut into theirs and it mustn't jar, it must fit in exactly so no-one can tell the difference." MacDonald has directed second unit on such films as X-Men Origins: Wolverine, The Bourne Ultimatum, Harry Potter and the Goblet of Fire, Batman (1989), Cry Freedom, and Tango & Cash.

== Selected filmography ==
=== As director ===
Year	Film	Notes
1988	Rambo III	
1992	Mo' Money	
1993	The Young Indiana Jones Chronicles	Episode: "The Phantom Train of Doom"
1994	The NeverEnding Story III: Return to Fantasia	
1996	Tales from the Crypt	Episode "Escape"
1998	Legionnaire	
2000	The Extreme Adventures of Super Dave	
2001	The Monkey King	TV Miniseries

=== As producer ===
Year	Film	Notes
1989	Tango & Cash	Executive producer
1990	Graffiti Bridge	Executive producer
1996	The Quest	Executive producer
1998	Legionnaire	Producer
2005	Harry Potter and the Goblet of Fire	Co-producer

=== As camera operator ===
Year	Film
1968	The Girl on a Motorcycle
1972	Cabaret
1974	Murder on the Orient Express
1974	Zardoz
1975	The Return of the Pink Panther
1978	Superman The Movie
1980	Superman II
1983	Yentl
1985	Legend

=== As cinematographer ===
Year	Film
1986	Solarbabies
1987	Hamburger Hill
1989	Shag

=== As second unit director ===
Year	Film	Director
1979	Zulu Dawn	Douglas Hickox
1980	The Empire Strikes Back	Irvin Kershner
1981	Dragonslayer	Matthew Robbins
1981	Excalibur	John Boorman
1985	Rambo: First Blood Part II	George P. Cosmatos
1986	Labyrinth	Jim Henson
1987	Cry Freedom	Richard Attenborough
1989	Batman	Tim Burton
1989	Tango & Cash	Andrei Konchalovsky
1992	Radio Flyer	Richard Donner
1996	The Quest	Jean-Claude Van Damme
1997	Batman and Robin	Joel Schumacher
2002	Harry Potter and the Chamber of Secrets	Chris Columbus
2004	Harry Potter and the Prisoner of Azkaban	Alfonso Cuarón
2005	Harry Potter and the Goblet of Fire	Mike Newell
2006	Eragon	Stefen Fangmeier
2007	The Golden Compass	Chris Weitz
2007	The Bourne Ultimatum	Paul Greengrass
2009	X-Men Origins: Wolverine	Gavin Hood
2010	Percy Jackson & the Olympians: The Lightning Thief	Chris Columbus
2013	Jack the Giant Slayer	Bryan Singer
2014	Guardians of the Galaxy	James Gunn

=== As second unit photographer ===
Year	Film
1979	Zulu Dawn
1981	Excalibur
1985	Rambo: First Blood Part II
1986	Labyrinth
1987	Cry Freedom
1989	Batman
