= George T. Miller =

Scottish-born Australian film director (1943–2023)

- Born: George Turnbull Miller; 28 November 1943; Edinburgh, Scotland
- Died: 17 February 2023 (aged 79); Melbourne, Victoria, Australia
- Occupation: Film director
- Years active: 1969–2023
- Awards: Most Popular Film at Montreal World Film Festival; 1982 The Man from Snowy River

George Trumbull Miller (28 November 1943 – 17 February 2023) was a Scottish-born Australian film and television director and producer. He directed The Man from Snowy River, The NeverEnding Story II: The Next Chapter, Andre and Zeus and Roxanne.

Miller was born in Edinburgh on 28 November 1943. He started his career in 1966 working for Crawford Productions. "They trained you to do everything, they'd throw you in at the deep end to see if you sank or swam," he said. "I was one of the ones who swam – you wouldn't get that training anywhere now."

Miller said he was offered to direct Crocodile Dundee; but he had to turn it down, because he was going to make another film at the time, which ended up not being made.

Miller died from a heart attack in Melbourne on 17 February 2023, at the age of 79.

== Filmography ==
Year	Title	Notes
1978	Against the Wind	TV miniseries
1980	The Last Outlaw	TV miniseries
1982	The Man from Snowy River	
1985	The Aviator	
1985	Anzacs	TV miniseries
1986	Cool Change	
1987	Les Patterson Saves the World	
1987	Bushfire Moon	
1989	Spooner	TV movie
1990	The NeverEnding Story II: The Next Chapter	
1990	A Mom for Christmas	TV movie
1991	In the Nick of Time	TV movie
1992	Over the Hill	
1992	Frozen Assets	
1993	Gross Misconduct	
1994	Andre	
1995	Silver Strand	TV movie
1997	Zeus and Roxanne	
1997	Tidal Wave: No Escape	TV movie
1997	Robinson Crusoe	
1999	Journey to the Center of the Earth	TV miniseries
1999	Tribe	TV miniseries
2002	Cybermutt	TV movie
2005	Attack of the Sabretooth	TV movie
2009	Prey	
