= Noah Reid =

Canadian-American actor, musician, and voice actor (born 1987)

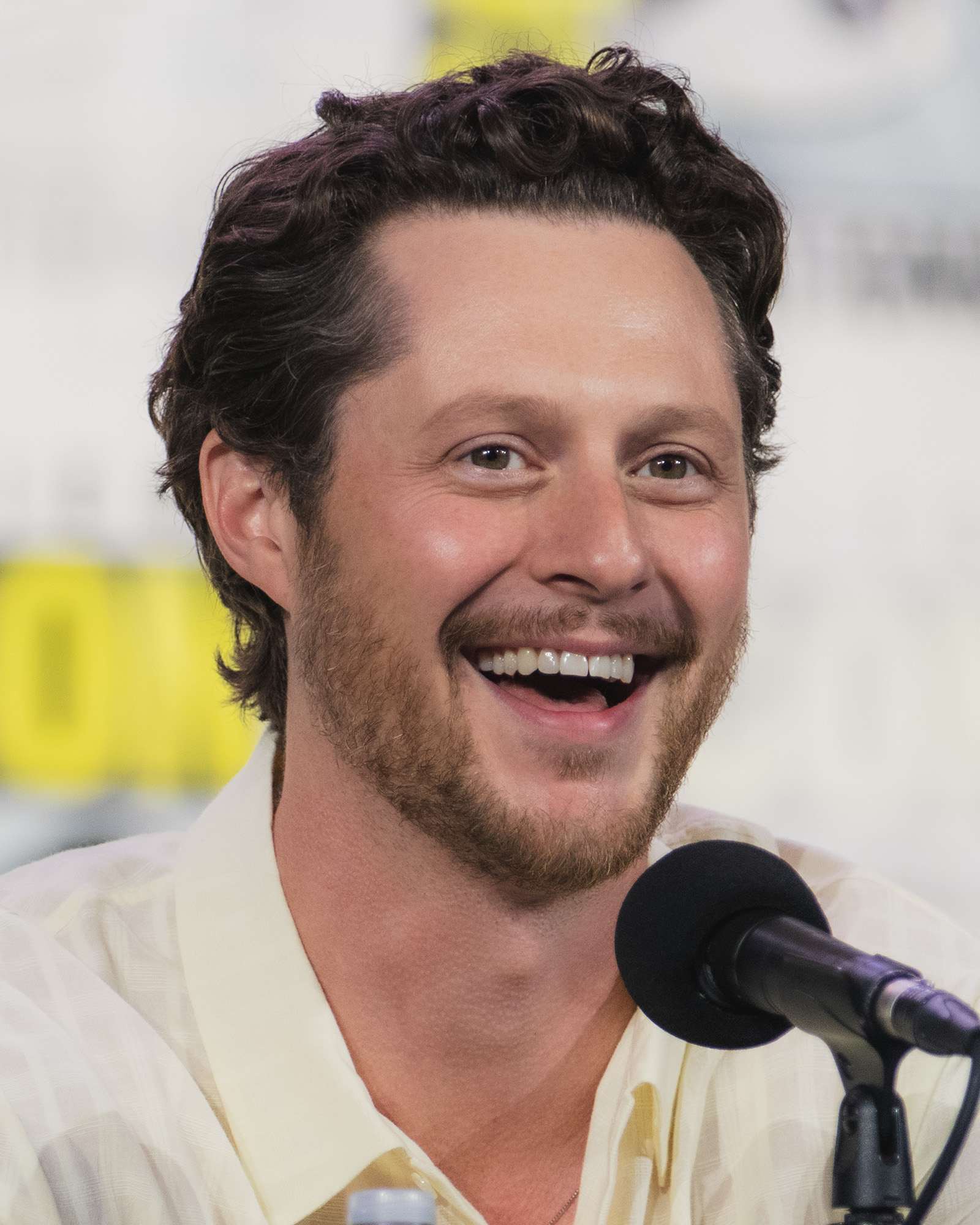
- Reid in 2026
- Born: Noah Nicholas Reid; May 29, 1987 (age 39); Toronto, Ontario, Canada
- Citizenship: Canada; United States
- Education: National Theatre School of Canada
- Occupations: Actor, musician
- Years active: 1996–present
- Spouse: Clare Stone (m. 2020)
- Children: 1

Noah Nicholas Reid (born May 29, 1987) is a Canadian-American actor and musician, best known for his work on the television series Franklin and Schitt's Creek. In 2016, he received a Canadian Screen Award nomination for Best Original Song for his work in the feature film People Hold On. In 2019, he received a Canadian Screen Award for Best Supporting Actor in a Comedy for his work on Schitt's Creek.

== Early life ==
Reid was born and raised in Toronto, Ontario. The son of visual artists, he became involved in theatre around age six and regularly attended productions with his family throughout his childhood. He attended Etobicoke School of the Arts and is a 2008 graduate of the National Theatre School of Canada.

== Career ==
Starting as a child actor, Reid did extensive voice work for Canadian and American children's television and was the original voice of the title character in Franklin from 1997 to 2002. While at Etobicoke School of the Arts, he co-starred in Strange Days at Blake Holsey High (2002–2006).

In 2005, Reid played Darrell Fox in the made-for-television movie Terry, dramatizing Terry Fox's historic run for cancer research. In 2007, he appeared in the Naturally, Sadie episode "As the Whirly Turns". In 2009, he guest-starred in the Degrassi: The Next Generation episode "Danger Zone".

Reid's first leading role in a feature film was Farley Gordon in Score: A Hockey Musical, which premiered at the 2010 Toronto International Film Festival. He then played several guest roles on television, including in the police drama Rookie Blue (2012, the project on which he met future wife Clare Stone) and the drama series Cracked (2013). In 2013, he also starred in the CW web series Backpackers. In 2015, Reid appeared briefly in the first episode of Annie Murphy's CBC television series The Plateaus. That year, he played the lead role in the ABC Family comedy series Kevin From Work, which was canceled after one season.

In 2016, Reid was nominated for a Canadian Screen Award for Best Original Song for his work in the feature film People Hold On (2015), in which he also starred. He also released a self-produced full-length original album, Songs From a Broken Chair.

In 2017, Reid played the recurring role of Patrick in the third season of the CBC series Schitt's Creek. That year, he was also cast in the independent film Cardinals opposite Sheila McCarthy, which premiered at the 2017 Toronto International Film Festival.

In 2018, Reid was promoted to a series regular on Schitt's Creek, beginning with its fourth season. He also performed in a production of Hamlet at the Tarragon Theatre in Toronto. He appeared in the films Buffaloed and Disappearance at Clifton Hill, both released in February 2020. Also in February, Reid embarked on a sold-out tour across North America to support his then-upcoming second album. However, two-thirds of the original dates had to be indefinitely postponed due to the COVID-19 pandemic. The album, Gemini, was released on May 29, 2020; the album's cover alluded to Reid's dual status as a musician and actor by depicting a Gemini Award statuette.

Reid made his Broadway debut in April 2022, joining the original Broadway cast of Tracy Letts's The Minutes, and released his third album, Adjustments, in June 2022. In the same year he also appeared as a guest musician on Artefact, the debut album by Clever Hopes.

On April 25, 2023, Reid announced a 26-city world tour, featuring stops in six countries, scheduled for the autumn of 2023. On May 2, 2023, dates in nine more cities were announced, extending the tour into January 2024.

In 2024, Reid appeared in Murder in a Small Town and starred in the Coal Mine Theatre's production of Samuel D. Hunter's A Case for the Existence of God.

In 2025, Reid toured for the first time without a band for his Solo Sessions tour in the spring, and announced a 33-city tour of the US and Canada scheduled for the fall of 2025.

In 2026, Reid appeared AMC's Interview with the Vampire's third season, and starred in Crave's half-hour drama Yaga.

== Personal life ==
Reid announced his engagement to former actress Clare Stone on December 31, 2018. They were married on July 25, 2020, and their first child, a son, was born in late summer 2022. Reid is a dual Canada-US citizen.

== Discography ==
=== Albums ===
Album	Year	Notes
Songs From a Broken Chair	2016	Self-produced
Gemini	2020	Baseline Music
Adjustments	2022	Baseline Music
T is for Tillerson EP	2024	Baseline Music

=== Singles ===
Year	Title	Album
2016	"Runaway"	Songs From a Broken Chair
2018	"Simply the Best"	Simply the Best (from "Schitt's Creek")
2020	"Honesty"	Gemini
2020	"Jacob's Dream"	Gemini
2020	"Hold On"	Gemini
2020	"Got You"	Gemini
2021	"A Case of You"	Performed for the Governor General's Awards in honour of Catherine O'Hara
2022	"Everyday"	Adjustments
2022	"Rivers Underground"	Adjustments
2022	"Minneapolis"	Adjustments
2022	"Statue's in the Stone"	Adjustments

== Theatre ==
Year	Title	Role	Company/Venue	Notes
1995–1997	Disney's Beauty and the Beast	Chip	Princess of Wales Theatre	Professional theatre debut
1999	Dave Carley's Big Box	Gilbert	Blyth Festival	Originating the role
2000	Who Has Seen The Wind	Brian	Theatre Aquarius, Hamilton, Ontario	Originating the role
2009	Three Sisters	Rode	Stratford Festival	
2009	Bartholomew Fair	Filcher	Stratford Festival	
2009	Morris Panych's Trespassers	Lowell	Stratford Festival	Originating the role
2009	Miklós László's Parfumerie	Jancsi	Soulpepper Theatre Company	Originating the role, also music director/composer of this adaptation's original music
2010	Daniel Karasik's The Innocents	Aaron	SummerWorks Theatre Festival	Originating the role
2013	David French's Jitters	Tom	Soulpepper Theatre Company	
2013	John Logan's Red	Ken	Neptune Theatre	
2014	George F. Walker's Dead Metaphor	Dean	Canadian Repertory Theatre / Panasonic Theatre	
2015	Creditors	Adolf	Coal Mine Theatre, Toronto	
2015	John Patrick Shanley's A Woman Is A Secret	Ricky	The Storefront Theatre, Toronto	Originating the role
2017	Annie Baker's The Aliens	Jasper	Coal Mine Theatre, Toronto	
2018	Hamlet	Hamlet	Tarragon Theatre	Also original music composition
2022	The Minutes	Mr. Peel	Steppenwolf Theatre Company / Studio 54	Broadway debut
2024	Samuel D. Hunter's A Case for the Existence of God	Ryan	Coal Mine Theatre, Toronto	

== Filmography ==
=== Film ===
Year	Title	Role	Notes
1996	In Love and War	Boy	
2000	Mattimeo: A Tale of Redwall	Scurl Droptail (voice)	
2000	Franklin and the Green Knight	Franklin Turtle (voice)	Direct-to-video
2001	Martin the Warrior: A Tale of Redwall	Keyla (voice)	
2001	The Santa Claus Brothers	Additional voices	Television film
2001	Franklin's Magic Christmas	Franklin Turtle (voice)	Direct-to-video
2002	Rolie Polie Olie: The Great Defender of Fun	Screwy (voice)	Direct-to-video
2005	Terry	Darrell Fox	Television film
2010	Score: A Hockey Musical	Farley Gordon	Lead role; premiered at the 2010 Toronto International Film Festival
2011	Three Inches	Walter Spackman	Television film
2012	Old Stock	Stock Burton	
2014	The Dependables	Elliott Ackers	Previously titled Pride of Lions
2015	People Hold On	Matthew	
2017	Cardinals	Mark Loekner	
2019	Disappearance at Clifton Hill	Marcus	
2019	Buffaloed	JJ	
2020	The Archivists	Will	Lead role; short film; premiered at the 2020 Toronto International Film Festival

=== Television ===
Year	Title	Role	Notes
1997–1999	Pippi Longstocking	Tommy Settergren (voice)	22 episodes; credited as Noah Reed
1997–2002	Franklin	Franklin (voice)	31 episodes
2000	Anne of Green Gables: The Animated Series	Spud (voice)	1 episode
2000–2001	In a Heartbeat	Mark	4 episodes
2001	Babar	Pom (voice)	13 episodes
2001	Soul Food	Ritchie Stein	Episode: "Who Do You Know?"
2001–2003	George Shrinks	Henry Cooper / Timmy Fortevoce (voice)	4 episodes
2001–2004	Rolie Polie Olie	Screwy (voice)	18 episodes
2002	The Strange Legacy of Cameron Cruz	Elmore "Tater" Brochet	Pilot
2002–2006	Strange Days at Blake Holsey High	Marshall Wheeler	41 episodes
2006	Jane and the Dragon	Gunther Breech (voice)	26 episodes
2007	Naturally, Sadie	Todd	Episode: "As the Whirly Turns"
2009	Degrassi: The Next Generation	Chris	Episode: "Danger Zone"
2012	The Firm	Brian Strickland	Episode: "Chapter Three"
2012	Rookie Blue	Wyatt Cripton	Episode: "Class Dismissed"
2012	Alphas	Adam Gordon	Episode: "Gaslight"
2012	Titanic	Harry Widener	Miniseries
2013	Cracked	Mark Tisdale	Episode: "Voices"
2013	Backpackers	Ryan	Web television series
2015	The Plateaus	Gaille	Episode: "Badger Trap"
2015	Kevin from Work	Kevin	Series regular
2016	House of Lies	Sam	Episode: "Tragedy of the Commons"
2017–2020	Schitt's Creek	Patrick Brewer	Series regular; 39 episodes
2022–2024	Outer Range	Billy Tillerson	Main cast
2024–2025	Murder in a Small Town	Tommy Cummins	3 episodes
2026	Anne Rice's The Vampire Lestat	Larry Slater	Also backing vocals on season soundtrack
2026	Yaga	Charlie Rapp	Main cast

== Awards and nominations ==
Year	Award	Category	Work	Result	Ref
2009	John Hirsch Award	Most Promising Young Actor, Stratford Festival	Morris Panych's Trespassers	Won	
2011	ACTRA Awards	Outstanding Performance – Male	Score: A Hockey Musical	Nominated	
2016	Canadian Screen Awards	Achievement in Music – Original Song	People Hold On (Song: People Hold On)	Nominated	
2017	My Entertainment World Critics' Picks Theatre Awards	Outstanding Supporting Actor (Medium)	Jasper, Annie Baker's The Aliens at The Coal Mine Theatre	Won	
2018	Canadian Screen Awards	Best Supporting or Guest Actor, Comedy	Schitt's Creek, Season 3	Nominated	
2019	ACTRA Awards	Members' Choice Series Ensemble	Schitt's Creek, Season 4	Won	
2019	Canadian Screen Awards	Best Supporting or Guest Actor, Comedy	Schitt's Creek, Season 4	Won	
2019	Dorian Awards	TV Musical Performance of the Year	Schitt's Creek (Performance: Simply the Best)	Nominated	
2019	Screen Actors Guild Awards	Outstanding Performance by an Ensemble in a Comedy Series	Schitt's Creek, Season 5	Nominated	
2020	ACTRA Awards	Members' Choice Series Ensemble	Schitt's Creek, Season 5	Won	
2020	Canadian Screen Awards	Best Supporting Actor, Comedy	Schitt's Creek, Season 5	Nominated	
2020	Dorian Awards	TV Musical Performance of the Year	Schitt's Creek (Performance: Always Be My Baby)	Nominated	
2020	Screen Actors Guild Awards	Outstanding Performance by an Ensemble in a Comedy Series	Schitt's Creek, Season 6	Won	
2021	ACTRA Awards	Members' Choice Series Ensemble	Schitt's Creek, Season 6	Won	
2021	Canadian Screen Awards	Best Supporting Actor, Comedy	Schitt's Creek, Season 6	Nominated	
2022	Canadian Folk Music Awards	English Songwriter(s) of the Year	Gemini	Nominated	
2022	Canadian Folk Music Awards	New/Emerging Artist(s) of the Year	Gemini	Nominated	
2023	Heritage Toronto	Public History Award	The History of the Danforth Music Hall	Nominated	
2025	Toronto Theatre Critics Awards	Best Lead Performance in a Play	A Case for the Existence of God	Won	
2025	Dora Awards	Outstanding Performance by an Individual	A Case for the Existence of God	Nominated	
2026	Canadian Screen Awards	Best Guest Performance, Drama Series	Murder in a Small Town, Season 2, Episode 8 "Masterpiece"	Nominated	
