= Soul Patrol =

Soul Patrol may refer to:

- Soul Patrol (fandom), fans of American Idol winner Taylor Hicks
- Soul Patrol (baseball), the outfield players of the 2001 Minnesota Twins season
- Soul Patrol, a 2000 British comedy film starring Davinia Taylor
- Soul Patrol, an SECW wrestling team of Norvell Austin and Brickhouse Brown
- Soul Patrol, a fictional group of dead people in The Scream Team
