= Dillon Casey =

American-Canadian actor (born 1983)

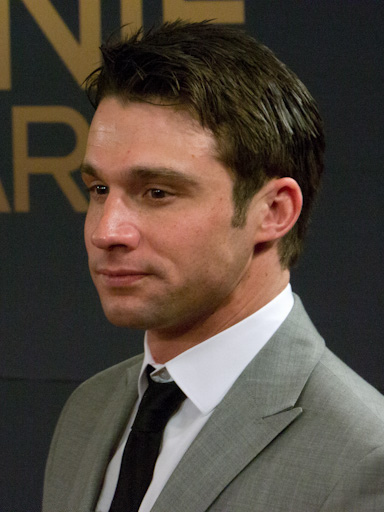
- Casey at the 32nd Genie Awards in 2012
- Born: Dillon Francis Casey; October 29, 1983 (age 43); Dallas, Texas, U.S.
- Education: University of Toronto; McGill University
- Occupation: Actor
- Years active: 2001–present
- Spouse: Lauren Lee Smith (m. 2024)

Dillon Francis Casey (born October 29, 1983) is an American-Canadian actor. He is best known for his role as Sean Pierce in The CW's action-thriller television series Nikita.

== Early life ==
Casey was born in Dallas, Texas, and raised in Oakville, Ontario. His father, Richard, is a urologist, and his mother, Patrice, is an image consultant. After graduating from Oakville Trafalgar High School, Casey graduated from McGill University with a Bachelor of Science degree in 2005, and earned a Master of Economics degree from the University of Toronto.

== Career ==
Casey moved to Toronto to return to his roots and was chosen to play the role of Trevor Lemonde in a short running CBC show called MVP. The show garnered attention for the actor, putting him on a giant billboard in his underwear in Times Square.

Casey relocated to Los Angeles, California for his career in January 2009. Over the next few years he attained guest roles on shows including Warehouse 13 and The Vampire Diaries and recurring roles on Valemont, Being Erica, and Skins.

In July 2011, Casey appeared as Brad in a notable episode of Torchwood: Miracle Day, titled "Dead of Night".

In 2011, he was cast as Navy SEAL Sean Pierce in the action show Nikita. Casey's part was initially intended to be a short term recurring role, but was upgraded to a series regular. He obtained his first lead role for the movie Creature which was released in September 2011 and was unsuccessful at the box office. In 2012, Casey was cast in The Vow, which was successful at the box office as the fourth-highest weekend debut of 2012.

Casey starred in the 2013 digital series Backpackers, and in the 2014-15 TV drama Remedy.

In 2016, he guest-starred in Marvel's Agents of S.H.I.E.L.D., appearing in the episodes "4,722 Hours" and "Maveth" as astronaut Will Daniels and Hydra Inhuman Hive.

== Filmography ==
=== Film ===
Year	Title	Role	Notes
2007	Killing Zelda Sparks	Bill	
2008	Shirtgun Guy	Shirtgun Guy	Film short; also producer
2009	Captain Coulier (Space Explorer)	Fred	Film short
2011	Creature	Oscar	
2012	The Vow	Ryan	
2013	Only I...	Van Walton	
2021	Defining Moments	Dave	
2023	Blackberry	Mark Guibert	
2023	The Amityville Curse	Frank Winfield	

=== Television ===
Year	Title	Role	Notes
2001	System Crash	Groovy Gary / Tommy Jensen	Episode: "Good Deeds Done Cheap"
2005	Code Breakers	Sentry (uncredited)	Television film
2006	11 Cameras	Chuck	Main role
2006	1-800-Missing	Steve Biggs	Episode: "Spring Break"
2007	Monster Warriors	Jock Strongjaw	Episode: "The Drive In"
2007	The Best Years	Brandon Zimmerman	4 episodes
2007	Too Young to Marry	Max Doyle	Television film
2008	MVP	Trevor Lemonde	Main role
2008	House Party	Sean Goldstein	Main role
2008	Victor	Glenn Crossley	Television film
2009	Aaron Stone	Dax	Episode: "Time Out"
2009	Warehouse 13	Cody Thomas	Episode: "Pilot"
2009	Valemont	Sebastian	16 episodes
2009	A Nanny's Secret	Carter	Television film
2009–2010	Being Erica	Ryan	6 episodes
2010	The Vampire Diaries	Noah	Episode: "Unpleasantville"
2011	Skins	Evan	3 episodes
2011	Torchwood	Brad	Episode: "Miracle Day: Dead of Night"
2011	Three Inches	Dillon	Television film
2011–2013	Nikita	Sean Pierce	Main Role (Seasons 2–3); 39 episodes
2013	Backpackers	Brandon	Lead role
2014–2015	Remedy	Griffin Connor	Lead role
2015	Agents of S.H.I.E.L.D.	Will Daniels and Hive	Episode: "4,722 Hours" as Will Daniels; Episode: "Maveth" as Hive
2016	A Perfect Christmas	Steve	Television film
2016–2017	Turn: Washington's Spies	Randall	3 episodes
2017–2018	Designated Survivor	Blakey	5 episodes
2019; 2021	Frankie Drake Mysteries	Jack Drake	Episode: "A Brother in Arms"; Episode: "A Family Affair"
2021	A Wedding Ring	Jamie Coleman	Television film
2021	Another Life	Seth Gage	
2021	The Great Christmas Switch	Patrick	Television film
2021	Christmas a la Carte	Grant Quinn	Television film
2023	Transplant	Jack (police officer)	Season 3, episode 9: "Rumination"
2026	Saint-Pierre	Claude Jackman	Episode: "Sleep No More"
2026	I Am Mary Jo Buttafuoco	Joey Buttafuoco	Television film
TBA	Bishop †	Inspector Banton	TBD episodes

Key
†	Denotes television productions that have not yet been released

== Awards and nominations ==
Year	Award	Category	Nominated work	Result	Ref.
2014	Canadian Screen Awards	Best Actor in a Continuing Leading Dramatic Role	Remedy	Nominated	
