= Greg Kramer =

British-Canadian author, actor, director, and magician (1961 – 2013)

- Born: 11 March 1961; Hertfordshire, England
- Died: 8 April 2013 (aged 52); Montreal, Quebec, Canada
- Occupations: Writer, actor, director, magician
- Writing career
- Period: 1980s–2013
- Notable works: The Pursemonger of fugu, Hogtown Bonbons, Couchwarmer

Greg Kramer (11 March 1961 – 8 April 2013) was a British-Canadian author, actor, director, and magician. Born and raised in Hertfordshire, England, he emigrated to Canada in 1981 and spent the remainder of his life living in Vancouver, Toronto and Montreal.

== Early life ==
Kramer was born in Hertfordshire, England on 11 March 1961.

== Career ==
His first novel, The Pursemonger of fugu, published by Riverbank Press in 1995, was shortlisted for the City of Toronto Book Award. His other novels included Couchwarmer (1997) and Wally (2004). His short story collection Hogtown Bonbons (1999) was originally published by Xtra! in Toronto as a regular column. He also wrote several theatrical plays.

As an actor, he appeared regularly on the television series Forever Knight, John Woo's Once a Thief and Tales from the Neverending Story, and as a voice actor in Tripping the Rift, George and Martha and Arthur. He also had supporting roles in numerous films, including 300, The Day After Tomorrow, I'm Not There and On the Road. In theatres he worked across Canada, from the Vancouver Playhouse to the National Arts Centre in Ottawa.

Directing credits include Tiger's Heart at the Centaur Theatre, Marat/Sade (Dora nomination, best production), and Cat on a Hot Tin Roof at the Segal Centre for Performing Arts in Montreal, which garnered him a Best Director MECCA award. Also a magician, Kramer was the magic consultant and coach for Des McAnuff's production of The Tempest at the Stratford Shakespeare Festival, featuring Christopher Plummer. As a playwright, his credits included Lies of the Vampyre, Skateboard Tango, and Isadora Fabulist! written for Imago Theatre, as well as Queens and the Great Out Doors.

== Personal life and death ==
Kramer was found dead in his Montreal apartment on 8 April 2013. Although a cause of death was not immediately confirmed, Kramer was HIV-positive and had previously had a lung removed due to a bout of lung cancer. His last play Sherlock Holmes was performed at the Segal Centre for Performing Arts in Montreal from 4 to 26 May 2013. The play, which starred Jay Baruchel in the titular role, had also cast Kramer as Inspector Lestrade. The play went ahead, with fellow cast member Patrick Costello stepping in to replace Kramer as Lestrade.

Kramer was openly gay.

== Filmography ==
Year	Title	Role	Notes
1999-2000	George and Martha	Anton (voice)	
2000	Wilder	Dugald Ferdinand	
2001-2014	Arthur	Nemo (voice)	
2002	Abandon	Andre	
2004	The Day After Tomorrow	RAF #2	
2006	300	Ephor #1	
2007	I'm Not There	Drunk	
2012	On the Road	Mississippi Gene	
