= Ann Pirvu =

Romanian-Canadian actress

- Born: Anca Eliana Pîrvu; May 25, 1987 (age 39); Brașov, Romania
- Education: Ryerson University (now Toronto Metropolitan University)
- Occupations: Actress, producer
- Years active: 2005–present
- Spouse: Christopher Giroux (2023-present)
- Children: 1

Anca Eliana Pîrvu (born May 25, 1987), known professionally as Ann Pirvu, is a Romanian-born Canadian actress and producer from Toronto, Ontario. She is best known for her roles in the television series Reign, Remedy, The Girlfriend Experience and Workin' Moms.

== Early life and education ==
Pirvu was born into a family of engineers in Brașov, Romania. As a child she performed in national talent shows and won several awards. Her family moved to Canada when she was 12 years old. She grew up in Edmonton, Alberta.

She has a Bachelor's degree in Broadcast journalism from Ryerson University (now Toronto Metropolitan University) and an International Baccalaureate Diploma.

According to her Facebook profile, she married on 23 November 2023 Christopher Giroux, by whom she has one child.

== Career ==
Pirvu portrayed Nicole Touchet in the CW's series Reign, appearing in the fourth season. She is currently portraying the role of Trish on the television series Workin' Moms.

== Filmography ==
Television and film roles
Year	Title	Role	Notes
2005	Pure Malice	Karyn	TV film
2008	G2G: Got to Go!	Rainbow (voice)	Unknown episodes
2010	Living in Your Car	Elena	Episode #1.7
2011	Tile Man	Lisa	TV film
2011	Servitude	Partygoer's girlfriend	TV film
2012	Totally Spies!	Iceolina (voice)	Episode: "Evil Ice Skater"
2013	The Junction	Elena	Short film
2014	Remedy	Josey the Therapeutic Clown	3 Episodes (Season 1)
2014	Swearnet: The Movie	Emily Anne	TV film
2014	Astraea	Nora	Short film
2015	Open Heart	Sherri	Episode: "Unknown Soldier"
2015	Odd Squad	Evil Queen	Episode: "Undercover Olive"
2016	The Masked Saint	Emily Anne	TV film
2016	The Girlfriend Experience	Stacy	Episode: "Entry"
2016	Total Frat Movie	Rebecca 'Becca' Henley	TV film
2017	Reign	Nicole Touchet	9 Episodes (Season 4)
2017	Miss Odette's Modern Handbook to Manners	Samantha	Short film
2020	Is There a Killer in My Family?	Dina	TV film
2020	Workin' Moms	Trish	3 Episodes (Season 4)
2020	Learning to Love Again	Jane	TV film
2022	Undercover Holiday	Margot	TV film
2024	Operation Nutcracker	Jules	TV film
2024	The Heiress and the Handyman	Nina Hudson	TV film
2025	Rodeo Christmas Romance	Kathleen Parks	TV film
2026	Bee My Love	Hannah Jones	TV film

=== Video games ===
Video game credits
Year	Title	Role	Notes
2016	Watch Dogs 2	Various (voice)	
