= List of Naturally, Sadie episodes =

Naturally, Sadie is a Canadian teen comedy-drama television series that aired between June 24, 2005, and August 26, 2007, on Family Channel. The series ran for three seasons, airing a total of 65 episodes.

== Series overview ==
Season	Episodes	Originally released	
Season	Episodes	First released	Last released
1	26	June 24, 2005	September 18, 2005
2	26	April 2, 2006	January 14, 2007
3	13	June 3, 2007	August 26, 2007

== Episodes ==
=== Season 1 (2005) ===
No. overall	No. in season	Title	Original release date	Prod. code
1	1	"Survival Swim"	August 14, 2005	101
Sadie insults Chelsea in her class when she compares her to a "hippo". Sadie then has to do damage control before Chelsea takes revenge on Sadie's love life.
2	2	"Survival of the Stupidest"	Unknown	102
Sadie and her lame but resilient older brother, Hal, face off in a last student standing car contest; Rain trains for the contest as he and Margaret hope to solve their financial problems with the winning prize.
3	3	"Forest for the Trees"	July 16, 2005	103
Sadie tries to keep her favorite tree from being cut down. Rain tries to succeed in the frog racing circuit.
4	4	"Pack of Lies"	July 24, 2005	104
Sadie again attempts to impress Owen Anthony, by trying to separate him from the dopey Sadie-dissing jocks he hangs out with, this time getting him into a jam session with her musician brother Hal.
5	5	"Social Climbers"	June 24, 2005	105
When Margaret tries to show Sadie how to move up the social ladder, she only manages to embarrass Chelsea.
6	6	"Under the Surface"	June 25, 2005	106
A cute new science teacher causes Sadie to lose focus, jeopardizing her father/daughter bonding weekend. Meanwhile, Rain and Margaret take their communication methods to the next level.
7	7	"Advanced Girl Lessons"	August 13, 2005	107
When a neighbor mistakes her for a boy, Sadie decides to make herself look more feminine.
8	8	"A Nose Is a Nose"	Unknown	108
When Sadie gives a presentation, she is inspired by Bonnie Beckmann's prominent nose.
9	9	"Unified Hal Theory"	August 6, 2005	109
Sadie attempts to devise a theory to explain her brother Hal's annoying behavior.
10	10	"Best of Enemies"	August 21, 2005	110
Margaret and Rain think Sadie likes Ron, and try to set them up. Rain tries to gain Vivian's sympathy by pretending to have a broken arm.
11	11	"Be Our Pest"	August 28, 2005	111
Sadie finds out what a pest Margaret can be, when she temporarily moves in with the Hawthornes.
12	12	"Drift Away"	August 20, 2005	112
Sadie and Margaret decide to end their friendship. So Sadie decides to pursue a new friendship with Chelsea, who has the same interests as she does, but she is only after Hal. Sadie and Margaret make up in the end.
13	13	"Myth Adventures"	July 9, 2005	113
After a party where she was stuck in the closet with Ron, Sadie becomes the victim of cruel gossip that nearly ruins her reputation.
14	14	"Unusual Suspects"	July 10, 2005	114
Sadie tries to find out who burglarized Dr. Finch's store, even though he doesn't want her help.
15	15	"Everybody Scoops"	August 27, 2005	115
A disappointing internship causes Sadie to re-evaluate her career goals.
16	16	"Everything's Relative"	August 7, 2005	116
Sadie's decision to concentrate on her application to the "Roots & Shoots" volunteer program, run by her idol Jane Goodall, jeopardizes her history project with Mallory on a Hawthorne ancestor.
17	17	"Coma Chameleon"	July 17, 2005	117
After convincing her teacher that she's the most qualified to take care of the science class's pet reptile, a bearded dragon, Sadie accidentally loses it.
18	18	"Life Cycle"	July 30, 2005	118
Margaret tries to show Sadie that her crush, Owen Anthony, has flaws like anyone. But this only seems gets Owen interested in Margaret instead of Sadie.
19	19	"Best of Breed"	July 2, 2005	119
After seeing a pet and its owner in matching outfits, Sadie enters a speech contest with an essay on "animal domestication".
20	20	"To Each His Owen"	August 6, 2005	120
Sadie desperately tries to make her family look more "normal" to Owen. On the side, Tad keeps stealing all of Rain's jokes.
21	21	"Off the Map"	July 31, 2005	121
Sadie's class find themselves on a treasure hunt for clues that will solve an old school legend. Rain becomes the school hall monitor.
22	22	"Whose Line Is It Anyway?"	July 3, 2005	122
When a hot band comes to town for a concert, Sadie and Margaret try to get tickets.
23	23	"Quiz Show"	June 26, 2005	123
Sadie objects to the dictatorial methods of the captain of the quiz team (Ron Yuma). Absent: Justin Bradley as Hal Hawthrone
24	24	"Surprise!"	July 23, 2005	124
When she finds all her family and friends acting suspiciously whenever she's around, Sadie determined to find out what is going on.
25	25	"Right-Minded"	June 24, 2005	125
Sadie is miserable when she discovers that her brother Hal must tutor her or risk failing art class. Meanwhile, Rain tries to keep his Greek folk dancing commitment a secret from Margaret.
26	26	"Night Crawlers"	September 18, 2005	126
Hal develops a love of steaks; Sadie is creeped out by all her house's odd noises at night.

=== Season 2 (2006–07) ===
No. overall	No. in season	Title	Original release date	Prod. code
27	1	"Risky Business"	April 2, 2006	201
Sadie and Margaret attempt to complete a list of five risks before a deadline for a bet. Meanwhile, Rain turns to Hal for help after he has problems getting a girl to notice him.
28	2	"Year of the Dragon"	April 9, 2006	202
Sadie is planning the school dance for komodo dragons. However, Margaret and Rain have their own secret agendas. When Hal finds out, he blackmails Margaret and Rain into getting Hal's band to play at the dance.
29	3	"Home Alone"	April 16, 2006	203
Sadie finally has a night alone with her friends, but Hal's plans are canceled. To save her night, she gets Hal a date with Arden. Margaret is worried everyone thinks her and Rain are a couple. Guest: Jon Dore makes an appearance in this episode.
30	4	"Maximum Overdrive"	April 23, 2006	204
Sadie gets frustrated when everyone is counting on her to do their work for them.
31	5	"Election"	April 30, 2006	206
Sadie and Ben run for school class president and get caught up in their actions.
32	6	"The Last Waltz"	May 7, 2006	207
Arden tries to ruin Sadie and Ben's relationship when she gets jealous that he picks Sadie to dance with in gym class over her.
33	7	"The Upside of Anger"	May 14, 2006	205
Jean registers herself and Sadie for a self-defense class, as part of their mother-daughter bonding. However, Margaret turns out to be better at it than Sadie, and Sadie gets jealous. Margaret and Jean start spending more and more time together, leaving Sadie feeling lonely.
34	8	"Double Jeopardy"	May 21, 2006	208
Sadie forgets she is going to the homecoming dance with Owen Anthony, when Ben Harrison asks her. Hal tricks her by appearing to help her with her problem. During the dance, Hal has Sadie running between Owen and Ben. However, when Hal calls Sadie up to the stage to give a speech, Ms. Mann invites Sadie to bring her date to come with her. When Ben and Owen find out, Owen gets mad while Ben takes her back and kisses Sadie on the forehead.
35	9	"Brother from Another Planet"	May 28, 2006	209
Jean and Walter Hawthorne are getting tired of Hal and Sadie's constant arguing – Hal and Sadie are both grounded and forbidden to go to a bowling party. Hal wants to get a gig for his band at the bowling alley, and Sadie wants to hang out with Ben. While their parents are at a costume party, Sadie and Hal work together to sneak out to the bowling alley. Meanwhile, Margaret tries to hide her "secret" from Jamie.
36	10	"The Parent Trap"	July 1, 2006	210
Ben and Sadie get paired up to take care of a pretend baby for class, and they argue about their different parenting styles.
37	11	"The Great Outdoors"	July 8, 2006	211
Sadie teams up with Margaret and Arden to face Rain, Ben and Ron in a battle-of-the-sexes scavenger hunt.
38	12	"Prêt à Porter"	July 29, 2006	212
Margaret enters a fashion competition and Sadie models for her. Ben and Rain agree to take pictures for the competition but Rain is only in it for the girls.
39	13	"Rashômon"	September 10, 2006	213
Fred tries to find out who started a food fight at Acropolis Wow.
40	14	"The Mask"	September 17, 2006	214
Sadie becomes fed up with Ben's sarcastic attitude and questions if he's the right guy for her, especially after she meets a boy with whom she gets along with perfectly. Meanwhile, Ben considers telling Sadie his true feelings about her. Rain tries to get closer to Vivian... while hiding in a mascot costume.
41	15	"Meet the Hawthornes"	September 24, 2006	215
Sadie intentionally doesn't tell her parents that she and Ben are going on their first date. Meanwhile, Rain books Margaret and Hal to perform as a duet at a 1970s themed party at the Acropolis Wow.
42	16	"Play It Again, Sadie"	October 1, 2006	216
A school drama production brings out Sadie's jealous side when Arden is chosen to play Ben's love interest, and it's a part that involves some kissing.
43	17	"Match Me If You Can"	October 8, 2006	218
Sadie and Ben take a compatibility test, but it shows them to be just 1% alike which has Sadie worried, so they try to take interest in each other's hobbies. Meanwhile, Margaret is 99% compatible with her boyfriend, Rain is compatible with no one, and Hal is stalked by Mallory who has a crush on him.
44	18	"Ghouls Just Want to Have Fun"	October 14, 2006	217
Tabitha, Hal's girlfriend, persuades Arden to hand out wristbands that turn people into zombies.
45	19	"Working Stiffs"	October 22, 2006	220
Sadie gets a waitressing job at Acropolis Wow, and is then promoted to restaurant greeter, a job that Rain wanted. At school, Hal accidentally sprays orange soda on Ms. Mann, and Ben takes pictures of her. Ms. Mann's hair reacts with the soda, so she angrily forces Ben and Hal to work together on a school yearbook. At first, they don't get along, but after they both come up with a music video idea, they create a funny masterpiece on High School.
46	20	"English Patience"	October 29, 2006	221
Sadie becomes the subject of Hal's English oral assignment; Rain and Arden are starting to get close, but she is embarrassed to be seen with him at school.
47	21	"Two of a Kind"	November 5, 2006	222
Walter's competitive brother Steve-O comes for a visit, and he brings along his children Kal and Katie (Justin Bradley and Charlotte Arnold, in dual roles) who are the complete opposites of Hal and Sadie. Meanwhile, Margaret and Rain throw J.P. a birthday party at the Acropolis Wow, however, Margaret makes it a "Sweet 16" bash.
48	22	"Rules Rush In"	November 12, 2006	223
Sadie and Margaret host a call-in advice show at school which goes through many problems. Meanwhile, Hal gets an entire month of free pies, thanks to Rain's suddenly lucky quarter, but refuses to share any with him.
49	23	"The Bennett Club"	November 19, 2006	224
Sadie has her first Saturday detention with Rain, Margaret, Ben, and Arden, joining her as well. Meanwhile, Hal is apprehended by the mall security guard and is forced to see what it's like on the job.
50	24	"A Very Sadie Christmas"	December 16, 2006	219
Sadie tries to find the right Christmas present for Ben. Meanwhile, Rain is given the responsibility of decorating the Acropolis Wow for the holidays but is having a hard time. Also, Hal gets a job as a mall Santa and uses the opportunity to get free stuff from the mall.
51	25	"As Bad as It Gets"	January 7, 2007	225
Ben's ex-girlfriend, Heidi (Miriam McDonald) comes to Bennett High for a basketball tournament, and tries to reconnect with Ben, which makes Sadie jealous. Also, while the lunch ladies are on vacation, Rain, Hal and Ms. Mann serve Greek food at the cafeteria.
52	26	"Sliding Closet Doors"	January 14, 2007	226
The shirt that Sadie chooses will affect the last day of school before break. Will she choose to be with Ben or Chris Danvers?

=== Season 3 (2007) ===
No. overall	No. in season	Title	Original release date	Prod. code
53	1	"In with the Old, Out with the New"	June 3, 2007	301
Sadie is worried about her relationship with Ben because Ben is polite and not fun anymore. So, instead of saying she is Ben's girlfriend, she then invites Ben over to dinner, where she accidentally breaks up with him. She apologizes the next day, and they become friends. Meanwhile, Rain finds out his old friend, Taylor, has moved to Whitby, Ontario. They get together, but it is unsuccessful because Rain kept talking about the past. Then Margaret says she has a theory that they can't be friends anymore because they are crushing on each other. Taylor goes to talk to Rain about how they can't be friends anymore because Rain keeps talking about the past. Rain says they should do their secret handshake one last time for old times sake, and then they kiss.
54	2	"Smother's Day"	June 10, 2007	302
Sadie's mom takes up a part-time teaching job at R.B. Bennett. When her "motherly charms" prove too much to handle, Sadie and Hal lock horns to get her out of school, with a little help from Grandma. Meanwhile, Margaret gives Ron Uma a successful makeover which ends in him just needing to feel better about himself... and un-tucking his shirt.
55	3	"Too Hip Hop for the Room"	June 17, 2007	303
A new episode of reality-TV show "Changed" challenges Sadie to turn from Naturalist to Hip-Hop Diva. But emotions are on the rise as old crushes meet new ones.
56	4	"The Trial"	June 25, 2007	304
It all started when someone let out the lab mice from their cage. Prime suspects are Scared-of-mice-Arden and Lover-of-mice-Sadie, as both have motives for committing "Operation Rodent Thunder" (as labelled by Hal). They are forced to go through a mock trial to find out the real perpetrator. Ben agrees to be Sadie's attorney, but they end up kissing on the witness stand. Arden manages to rope in Hal as her lawyer, but he's in it for cereal box prizes and humiliating Sadie. Rain, meanwhile, fulfills his dream as an efficient-albeit-snobbish and intruding court reporter.
57	5	"Poetic Justice"	July 1, 2007	305
The "Wow" is hosting a Poetry Night, and Ben, with a little nudge from Sadie, decides to do a recitation on that night. After being compelled to write from the heart, he makes Sadie's rejection as the subject. Things get out of control when the poem turns into the fifth most downloaded rap-song. Trouble is also at hand, when Shopping Mall-Cop becomes School Hall-Cop. Rain and Taylor are a couple.
58	6	"Sadie's Millions"	July 8, 2007	306
Sadie's Aunt Helen has died, leaving $500 for Hal and herself. Hal plans to blow all the money on promoting Morning Breath in front of Agent Stan Obermeyer. Sadie tries new things with her share. But what happens when Sadie finds out about the horrible history of her Aunt, and the supposed jinx on the money?
59	7	"Hal's Kitchen"	July 15, 2007	307
After breaking their mother's favorite vase, Hal and Sadie try to raise money to replace it. Hal sets up a diner in the living room, while Sadie decides to baby-sit a goat. Meanwhile, Margaret gives Rain bad advice which ruins his first date with Taylor. Taylor gives Rain a hug and a kiss after Rain calms the rabid goat.
60	8	"The Graduate"	July 22, 2007	308
Sadie becomes worried that Hal is being taken advantage of when he falls for a college girl named Jen (Kate Todd). Rain learns that his lifelong crush likes him, but he is dating Taylor. Taylor overhears Rain asking Margaret how he should break up with Taylor. Rain realizes he made a big mistake and Taylor gives him a second chance.
61	9	"As the Whirly Turns"	July 29, 2007	309
Sadie gets a new crush, Cole (Michael Seater), even though Ben tells her that Cole is wrong for her. After hearing this, Sadie thinks Ben is jealous and ignores his advice to stay away. Margaret wants Rain to play Whirly-ball with the gang because he used to be the champ at it when he was younger, but a bad experience prevents him from playing.
62	10	"The Hawthorne Identity"	August 5, 2007	310
When Sadie's cousin Katie (Charlotte Arnold, in a dual role again) is suspended from her school and transfers to R.B. Bennett, she sets her sights on Ben. Margaret gives Sadie advice on how to handle her situation. Meanwhile, Hal and Walter work together for Career Day.
63	11	"Material Curl"	August 12, 2007	311
Sadie's parents' anniversary is coming up, and Hal and Sadie must find a present for them. Margaret gets an internship with a fashion designer.
64	12	"The Make-Up" "The Jacqueline Princess Bride"	August 19, 2007	312
Hal thinks Mallory is trying to trick him to go on a date with her when they meet to discuss business over a TV cooking show on Friday night. Ron Yuma and Sadie accidentally make plans to hang out together. Taylor sets up a double date for her and Rain with Sadie and Ron Yuma.
65	13	"In or Out of Africa"	August 26, 2007	313
Sadie has to decide whether to safari in Africa, or stay with her friends and family when everyone starts getting ready for summer. Ben and Sadie get back together. Taylor and Rain end up as boyfriend and girlfriend.
