= Backpackers (web series) =

- Genre: Comedy
- Created by: Daniel Dales Jarrett Sherman Jay Bennett
- Starring: Dillon Casey; Noah Reid; Meghan Heffern; Giacomo Gianniotti; Laurent Maurel
- Countries of origin: Canada; United States
- Original language: English
- No. of seasons: 1
- No. of episodes: 32 (web version); 3 (TV version)

Production
- Executive producers: Jay Bennett; Maggie Murphy; Christina Jennings; Scott Garvie; Tom Mazza
- Camera setup: single-camera
- Running time: 4–16 minutes (web version); 22 minutes (TV version)
- Production companies: Smokebomb Entertainment; Shaftesbury U.S. (TV version); The CW Television Network (TV version)

Original release
- Network: CTV.ca; CW Seed; The CW
- Release: 2013–2015 (web version); July 14, 2014 – July 21, 2014 (TV version)

Backpackers is a Canadian comedy web series, which aired in 2013 on CTV.ca and CW Seed. The CW picked up the series for television broadcast, for which material from the web series was edited into four half-hour episodes, and six new episodes were produced. Backpackers made its television premiere on July 14, 2014. The series stars Dillon Casey and Noah Reid as Brandon and Ryan, two friends on a backpacking trip across Europe after Ryan and his girlfriend Beth (Meghan Heffern) experience cold feet over their pending engagement. Ryan's stolen journal is posted on the Internet and goes viral, sending Ryan, Brandon, and Brandon's brother Andrew (Giacomo Gianniotti) on another journey, to recover the journal and fulfill Ryan's dream of becoming a published author.

The web series was produced by Smokebomb Entertainment, the digital content division of Shaftesbury Films. The television series is produced by Shaftesbury U.S. and Smokebomb in association with The CW.

Casey garnered a Canadian Screen Award nomination for Performance in a Program or Series Produced for Digital Media at the 2nd Canadian Screen Awards.

On July 23, 2014, The CW removed Backpackers from its schedule after just two episodes, and released the remaining episode on CW Seed.

== Webisodes ==
=== Season 1 ===
Eight webisodes were released on the CTV website, as well as CW Seed, in 2013.

No.	Title	Directed by	Written by
1	"Chapter 1: Pilot"	Josh Levy	Adam M. Reid & Max B. Reid
2	"Chapter 2: Trans-Europe Express"	Josh Levy	Adam M. Reid & Max B. Reid
3	"Chapter 3: A Milf-ey Coast"	Josh Levy	Adam M. Reid & Max B. Reid
4	"Chapter 4: Balls"	Josh Levy	Adam M. Reid & Max B. Reid
5	"Chapter 5: Di Qui All'Eternita aka From Here To Eternity"	Josh Levy	Adam M. Reid & Max B. Reid
6	"Chapter 6: Ich Bin Ein Backpacker"	Josh Levy	Adam M. Reid & Max B. Reid
7	"Chapter 7: Prague is For Lovers"	Josh Levy	Adam M. Reid & Max B. Reid
8	"Chapter 8: Sexy Boys Forever"	Josh Levy	Adam M. Reid & Max B. Reid

=== Season 2 ===
In 2015, The CW began releasing episodes for a second season on CW Seed. The 6 episodes filmed for television were split into 24 webisodes.

No.	Title	Directed by	Written by
1	"Chapter 9"	Josh Levy	Adam M. Reid & Max B. Reid
2	"Chapter 10"	Josh Levy	Adam M. Reid & Max B. Reid
3	"Chapter 11"	Josh Levy	Adam M. Reid & Max B. Reid
4	"Chapter 12"	Josh Levy	Adam M. Reid & Max B. Reid
5	"Chapter 13"	Josh Levy	Adam M. Reid & Max B. Reid
6	"Chapter 14"	Josh Levy	Adam M. Reid & Max B. Reid
7	"Chapter 15"	Josh Levy	Adam M. Reid & Max B. Reid
8	"Chapter 16"	Josh Levy	Adam M. Reid & Max B. Reid
9	"Chapter 17"	Josh Levy	Adam M. Reid & Max B. Reid
10	"Chapter 18"	Josh Levy	Adam M. Reid & Max B. Reid
11	"Chapter 19"	Josh Levy	Adam M. Reid & Max B. Reid
12	"Chapter 20"	Josh Levy	Adam M. Reid & Max B. Reid
13	"Chapter 21"	Josh Levy	Ian Malone
14	"Chapter 22"	Josh Levy	Ian Malone
15	"Chapter 23"	Josh Levy	Ian Malone
16	"Chapter 24"	Josh Levy	Ian Malone
17	"Chapter 25"	Josh Levy	Ian Malone
18	"Chapter 26"	Josh Levy	Ian Malone
19	"Chapter 27"	Josh Levy	Ian Malone
20	"Chapter 28"	Josh Levy	Ian Malone
21	"Chapter 29"	Josh Levy	Adam M. Reid & Max B. Reid
22	"Chapter 30"	Josh Levy	Adam M. Reid & Max B. Reid
23	"Chapter 31"	Josh Levy	Adam M. Reid & Max B. Reid
24	"Chapter 32"	Josh Levy	Adam M. Reid & Max B. Reid

== Television episodes ==
The television episodes each consist of two webisodes merged.

No.	Title	Directed by	Written by	U.S. air date	U.S. viewers (millions)
1	"It's Like, 'ow You Say, The Crazy Love"	Josh Levy	Adam M. Reid & Max B. Reid	July 14, 2014	0.59
As best friends Ryan and Brandon race across Europe in search of Ryan's missing bride-to-be, they find themselves struggling with the eternal twenty-something question of what to do with their lives.
2	"A-MILF-ey Coast"	Josh Levy	Adam M. Reid & Max B. Reid	July 21, 2014	0.35
Ryan is obsessed with finding his fiancée Beth, so he and Brandon reach out to Beth's family to locate her travel itinerary. They quickly find themselves at Beth's younger brother Randall's mercy when he demands payment in the form of topless photos before handing over any info. The guys head to a beach on the Amalfi Coast and spot Isabella Cucinota, the screen siren of Brandon's childhood dreams. Ryan wants to stay focused on getting a topless photo for Beth's brother, but Brandon can't say no when Isabella invites the guys back to her place.
3	"Ich bin ein Backpacker"	Josh Levy	Adam M. Reid & Max B. Reid	Unaired	TBD
The search for Beth continues, and Ryan and Brandon end up at a music festival in Berlin. They run into Mitchell who, still annoyed at being ditched, withholds Beth's whereabouts, and more importantly, who she is with. Meanwhile, Brandon finds himself choosing friendship over love when he decides to continue to help Ryan search for Beth instead of following his heart.
