= King (2003 TV series) =

Canadian TV series

- Genre: Animated series Fantasy
- Created by: Gordon Coulthart
- Developed by: Mary Crawford; Alan Templeton
- Directed by: Jerry Popowich (season 1); Gordon Coulthart (season 2)
- Voices of: Mark Rendall; James Kee; Adam Greydon Reid; Robert Tinkler; Julie Lemieux; Cathal J. Dodd; Marnie McPhail
- Composers: Amin Bhatia; Arin Posner
- Country of origin: Canada
- Original language: English
- No. of seasons: 2
- No. of episodes: 52

Production
- Executive producers: Steven DeNure; Beth Stevenson; Frank Taylor; Rick Morrison (season 2); Firdaus Kharas (season 2)
- Producer: Gordon Coulthart
- Running time: 22 minutes
- Production companies: Decode Entertainment; Funbag Animation Studios

Original release
- Network: Family Channel
- Release: August 15, 2003 – March 19, 2005

King is a Canadian children's animated television series produced by Decode Entertainment and Funbag Animation Studios that aired on Family Channel between August 15, 2003, and March 19, 2005.

== Plot ==
Russell Wright is a 12-year-old boy who finds a portal under his bed that leads to an alternate universe called Under. As he is from 'Up' (i.e., the regular world) and acquires the crown of Under, he is proclaimed the King.

Most episodes have multiple subplots, and deal with villain Bob Wire's attempts of stealing the crown and becoming king himself; however, he is regularly foiled by Russell or his friends. Other recurring themes are the attempts of Cliff, who was the former king of Under, to bully Russell into handing over the crown while he's in Up; and various confrontations between Under and the neighboring country of Near Under. Added to this are issues involving monsters, money, environmental issues, and even time travel.

== Characters ==
=== Protagonists ===
- Russell Wright (voiced by Mark Rendall) is a 12-year-old boy who discovered a passageway to Under in his house. There, he befriends Loopy and Vernon and challenges Bob Wire for the crown, subsequently becoming Under's new king. Russell's crown gives him the ability to breathe underwater as long as it is worn.
- Gus (voiced by James Kee) is a West Highland White Terrier who is capable of speech while in Under. He is loyal to Russell and his friends, and is very brave and blunt, often taking on much larger foes.
- Loopy (voiced by Adam Greydon Reid) is one of Russell's subjects, who displays effeminate and cowardly tendencies, such as being obsessed with butterflies and fireworks. He is part of the royal court as Under's First Buffoonist. Loopy is able to tame almost any animal, from squumps to sky cows to various undersea creatures.
- Vernon (voiced by Robert Tinkler) is an android built by the Clockmaker who works in the royal court as Under's figurer-outer and gizmologist.
- Populah (voiced by Julie Lemieux) is a former princess, who used to be the ruler of Near Under but "gave it up" because it was "too much trouble". She can breathe underwater naturally, without the need of the crown, as can her cousin Tess.

=== Antagonists ===
- Cliff (voiced by Robert Tinkler) is the former King of Under, who was overthrown by Russell. Sometimes, he attempts to sneak into Russell's room (and down to Under) while Russell is away, usually being foiled by Russell's sister Lou or his own stupidity.
- Bob Wire (voiced by Cathal J. Dodd) is Cliff's former assistant, who has taken to trying to make himself king of Under by stealing the Crown from Russell. His body is made of metal coils.
- Frags (voiced by Robert Tinkler and James Kee) are two small green creatures who are henchmen of Bob Wire. They tend to be extremely lazy and are generally somewhat more intelligent than their boss.
- Auntie First (voiced by Marnie McPhail) is the narcissistic, self-absorbed, oppressive despot of Near Under. She is not very good at her job but maintains it nevertheless, generally through a combination of threatening bodily harm, bribery, and blackmailing. She is referred to as "Auntie" by everybody, even those who are not related to her.
- Captain Darling (voiced by James Kee) is Auntie First's assistant. Darling will do anything to help Auntie, even if it means teaming up with her enemies, like Russell. He's in charge of the Near Under's By The Book Brigade.

=== Other rulers ===
- Cousin Tess (voiced by Alison Sealy-Smith) — The ruler of Undersea. She and Auntie First used to wage war on each other because they wore the same dress to a formal dance when they were in Despot School. Captain Darling put an end to the fighting by colorizing an old home video of the two fighting, deceptively coloring the dresses in different colors. Regardless, Auntie and Tess still fight all the time as a hobby.
- Hugh the Yu-Yu (voiced by Maurice Dean Wint) — The ruler of Under Under. He rules over the Yu-Yus and Slythers (including his pet Slyther, Mavis). He is very hippie-like, loves to party, and goes where life takes him, rolling a pair of fuzzy dice to make his decisions.
- "The Queen" — The ruler of Throng. Like her people, the Queen (whose name has not been revealed in the show) has a phobia of germs and uncleanliness.
- King Lugobrius Rex — The ruler of the Empire of Flax. He summons many entertainers to his abode, and if they fail to please him, he then has them shaved naked and thrown in his dungeons.

=== Past kings of Under ===
- King Rocko - A teenage-looking king of whom Bob Wire was not particularly fond, as Rocko would often beat him and tie him up.
- King Baxter - When Loopy gave him extra fingers as a King Appreciation Day present, Ex-King Baxter ran away and joined an insurance company in Up, becoming a "top-notch typist".
- King Hobart - A young king who ran away after Loopy gave him an extra leg on a previous King Appreciation Day, allowing him to sprint at amazing speed.
- Kings Matt and Pat were twin kings who ruled Under before Cliff. They constantly fought over the crown and neglected their kingly duties, leading Under into disastrous and monster-plagued times. Vernon made a second crown so each twin could have one, but the plan failed as they promptly started fighting over the second one, ignoring the first one.
- King Cliff the Grim was king before Russell. He was called Grim for his poor hygiene as well as his immature and selfish personality. Bob Wire was Cliff's right-hand man before he succeeded him after Cliff moved away

=== Creatures ===
- Yu-Yus - Small creatures (about the size of frags) that inhabit Under Under. They are usually white (somewhat resembling living marshmallows) with spiky hair that cannot be discerned from the rest of their bodies. Like their leader Hugh, the Yu-Yus love to party and tame giant Slythers, earning themselves a reputation of being fierce and terrifying party animals.
- Guardilators - Large hulking people in the service of King Lugobrius Rex. They are tall with very muscular torsos and arms, and no nose.
- Florians - Plant people. Two notable factions, the Red Florians and the Yellow Florians had been waging a never-ending war over the last Thussle Bush. They communicate through smells and bursts of pollen.
- Outties - The inhabitants of Outieville, they all have "outie" belly buttons.
- Ipples - The inhabitants of a small and secluded jungle village. They are unable to make decisions for themselves, preferring to ask either Loopy ("The Great Decider" of Ipple lore) and later a butterflier (on Loopy's instructions).
- Juice Beasts - Sentient creatures who can squirt juice out of their tentacles. One of the most popular locations in Under is the Juice Beast Stand, which serves as a major social gathering place.
- Nossixs - Creatures that can change between being very small and weak to very big and muscle-bound. Great-great Uncle Zed once defeated a Nossix and locked it away in a bongo drum until Bob Wire used the Nossix to chase Russell out of the kingdom.
- Ghouls - Zombie-like creatures that have an uncontrollable craving for pickles. They must be kept away from pickles until the Horrorborealis is over because if they eat them, they will remain Ghouls permanently.
- Sky-cow – A flying cow-like creature. Russell and his friends use these as transportation regularly.
- Squirt Hog aka "Engene" - An elephant creature that filled with water and a trunk nozzle to squirt. They're usually used for watering eggs to grow into buildings and other construction structures.
- Greenback – A green frog-like creature that was once used as currency when Russell attempted to introduce money to Under. When Bob took control of all the greenbacks, making Under destitute, Russell repealed money, which made the greenbacks worthless.
- Sky-beast – A more commonly used creature used as transportation by Bob Wire and Auntie First. They have handlebar-like horns.
- Slyther – A large raptor-like creature with a shovel-like mouth used for digging. Many are domesticated, ridden as transport, and milked to make Slyther Cheese by the Yu-Yus.
- Night-slyther – Although it sounds like a relative to the common Slyther, it is more monstrous-looking than the more common Slyther. It looks like a big green ball with multiple eyes, tentacles, long arms with claws and mouths on them, as well as a big spiky mouth on its body. They use to living in the shadows of Under Under hence would only emerge overground at night.
- Corola Vines - Similar looking to Night-Slythers but are carnivorous plants. On Pollen Holiday, their "hand-vines" grow excessively outward of the swamp to catch prey but are eaten by a migration of giant sea herbivores.
- Thoosh – A large walrus-like creature native to Wall-Eye Lake. It spouts jet-water to instantly grow Tither Ferns and eat them. Its water can also instantly clean places.
- Asymtote – A large monster that normally harmless. When hungry, every step it takes is half the length of its previous step before it (to conserve energy).
- Rebuloc – A vicious badger-like creature native to the Flatulent Swamp.
- Blue Bird of Happenstance – A large blue bird with beak and eyes in reversed position (beak above eyes). Whoever it poops on is cursed with bad luck for a year. Its feathers bring good luck.
- Krenit – A creature with multiple eyes and a sticky tongue that grabs anything it touches.
- Ippy Clippy – A creature with eyestalks, a large club-like tail, and large arms that is the predator of the Krenit.
- Slorch – A large red furry creature that can breathe fire.
- Plurn – A large one-eyed squid-like fish. Baby Plurns live on land and breathe air, then the mother squirts them with ink and they turn into aquatic adults. Later in life, Plurns swim into the underwater Volcano Metamorpho and are erupted with wings, living the rest of their lives in the sky. Going into the volcano will return Plurned (ink-squirted) creatures back to their normal terrestrial selves.
- Spitesucker – A red leech-like creature that feeds on anger.
- Dream Gulper – A strange gelatinous creature that can make dreams and nightmares real.
- Gorble Birds – Hideous blue birds who secrete organic pink slop.
- Sea Clutch – A small fish-like creature. It got its name because it grabs things in its clutches.
- Rock Monkey - A monkey-like creature. Its arms are where its nose is supposed to be. Its favorite food is pumpernickel.
- Sea Sloth - A sloth-like creature native to the sea.
- Jelly Droppers - Large hovering jellyfish-like creatures who drop huge balls of blue jelly.
- Skiffer Skink - A bloodhound-like creature with a pig-like snout.
- Great Big Hairy Eye-Ball - A floating hairy eye that temporarily turns anyone who looks directly at it into stone.
- Bedrock Beast - A large, stout caterpillar-like creature that eats rock.
- Parabat - A flying manta ray-like creature. It is used as a parasail on Frolicking Island.
- Sharkrunner - A red dinosaur-like creature with a shark-like head and a shark fin.
- Squump - A dumb, lazy cow-like creature. It gives both eggs and milk which are used for certain food products such as wriggly pies.
- Fang Ferret - A small ferret like creature with sharp fangs and a strong bite.
- Donkey Horse - A donkey-like horse.
- Gigagut - A giant stomach monster that eats almost everything.
- Slaphappy - An incessantly happy creature who loves playing pranks.
- Pool Clam - A clam-like creature with three tongues that resemble hands.
- Piranha Moth - A savage moth-like creature that eats clothing.
- Skitchybug - A tiny blue bee-like creature that swarms around people as pests.
- Brainsucker - A moving lump of flesh. They jump on people's heads and make them dumb. Brainsuckers are afraid of light and only come out of their nest during the month-long eclipse.
- Ice Eel - Small flying eels that inhabit the Equatorial Glaciers, moving through the cracks in the ice.
- Pudrick - A small purple monster that acts as a "blame sponge". Unless blamed continually for everything that goes wrong, it will transform into a gargantuan creature and run amok.
- Fhrobish - A small, weasel-like creature whose bite can transform others into monsters.
- Dongo Worm - A giant worm that lives in the Uncertain City in Near Under. Its slime can cure the Monsteritis caused by the Fhrobish.
- Pilf - A rat-like creature with a masked face that is fond of stealing.
- Lurber - An enormous plant creature that only eats kings. Its fronds must be kept trimmed to keep the creature dormant.
- Guardgoyle - A bulldog-like creature used as a royal guardian. It will obey the King of Under and whoever wears the crown.
- Hammer Rhino - Large animals that can be ridden or used as Battering Rams.
- Omnivorous Fatloid - A large obese gluttonous creature that inhabits the new garbage dump of Under.
- Dandilinium Vartibrus - A rare species of butterfly found in Under.
- Noflier - A rare species of butterfly in Under.
- Sea Scarf - Large aquatic creatures that migrate through the Edible Archipelago.
- The Great Big Gehh - A mountain-sized snakelike creature that inhabits the Valley of the Outies.
- Shine Toad - In infant stage, they look like glowing frogs before metamorphosis. Later, transforms into large green feathery beings.
- Doubler - A mass of sentient green slime with shapeshifting abilities.
- Geet - A Giant creature that vaguely resemble a land-dwelling kraken. The adult Geet will use its giant tongue to catch food, ranging from people to cheese, pulling them back to its giant nest where the prey gets attached to the ceiling. The baby Geets then hatch and spit digestive enzymes onto the food until they liquefy and are then drunk by the babies.
- Gurd - A large swimming and walking creature that will eat people and then lay them as eggs. When the people hatch, they get imprinted and obsessed over the first thing they see.
- Dart Bird - Crane-like birds that are fired from crossbows, carrying letters in their claws. They travel great distances as Under's main courier service, even to Up.
- Monster Skiddadle Spray - Rabbits that spray repentant at monsters to chase them away.
- Esculizard - Alligators with stairs in their mouths that revolve like escalators.
- Squirt Pigs - Small pigs filled with paint to colorize anything. They can both squirt and mist color out like a spray can and hose.
- Excavator Camel- An all-terrain beast that Populah once used to help bring a Slorch back in its home.
- Hole Beast - A creature with a portal hole on its chest. Jumping through the holes will transport the victim to a random place.
- Gob Shooter - A monster used to dirty up Under in one of Bob's schemes.
- Triviper - A three-headed snake.
- Spitballer - A monster used to dirty up Under in one of Bob's schemes.
- Foot Launcher - A monster used to dirty up Under in one of Bob's schemes.
- Megaphone Speaker - A megaphone creature whose mouth moves to whatever is being said or broadcast with it.
- Living Furniture - Living chairs, tables, ottomans, stools, scales, lamps, and many other things. Primarily seen in Under's castle. Some furniture isn't alive, such as Throne and Auntie First's desk.

== Episodes ==
52 episodes were produced over two seasons.

Number	Title	Description
Season 1
1	Down to Under	The Wright family moves to a new house and Russell discovers the passage to Under under his bed. He befriends Loopy and Vernon and together with Russell's dog Gus, they challenge Bob Wire for the crown of Under and Russell becomes Under's new King.
2	Ex-Princess Up a Tree	Bob sends a fake SOS to Russell from ex-Princess Populah so he can lure him into a trap and steal back the crown. Meanwhile, Loopy hatches what he believes is an Urklet egg, only to find it was a vicious Rebbuloc, which terrorizes the throne room before escaping to Up and encountering Cliff, who was trying to sneak down to Under.
3	In Near Under and Out the Other	While trespassing in Near Under, Loopy is mistaken as a pet by Auntie First and she locks him away. When Russell goes to help, Gus is also taken and Populah has to help the King rescue his friends. After leaving for Near Under, Vernon starts work on Under's new currency: greenbacks, which Bob quickly began hoarding to himself.
4	The Self-Mobilating Gizmet	By Russell's request, Vernon builds a car. However, Bob steals it to bring to Auntie First as their new secret weapon for invading Under, leaving Russell and his friends stranded in the desert.
5	Never Be Nice to a Pubrick	Russell orders the populace of Under to stop blaming the Pubrick for all their problems, not knowing that this will allow the creature to turn into a fearsome beast. Meanwhile, Bob commandeers Vernon's ripulator to create a fault around Under, ransoming the Crown in exchange for the key that will set things right and prevent Night Slythers from emerging at sundown and destroying everything.
6	Blame It on the Moon	When a stray dog keeps him up all night, Russell goes down to Under and finds everybody sending their garbage up to the moon, and Gus and the crown are sucked away as well. When he goes to retrieve them, Russell learns from the Hermit who lives on the moon that one more load of garbage will send it crashing into Under next year.
7	Pollen Holiday	Mysterious pollen flows from Under up into Russell's room, knocking out Cliff and sending Russell down to investigate with Gus. When they get rid of the bush responsible, Loopy discovers that a mass of unknown monsters are bearing down on the town.
8	Very Big Faces	Bob tries to trick Auntie into invading Under, eventually carving a Floating Mountain into the shape of Russell's head that motivates Auntie to build a giant wall. This forces the Gorbal Birds to fly to Under instead of to their normal roost in Near Under. This upsets Russell since the birds start pooping on his newly constructed Roller Coaster (which he built since he's too short to ride one in Up).
9	Down in the Dark with the Yu-Yu's	While doing some plumbing, Russell and his friends are sucked down to Under Under where the crown is eaten by a Slyther. They befriend her owner Hugh the Yu-Yu, who is living under a giant stalactite that is poised to fall at any moment. Since his Fuzzy Dice told him to stay, Hugh, despite Russell's insistence refuses to leave.
10	Roughing It's Not that Hard	Russell decides to practice for his Gopher Scout camping merit badge in Under. Vernon dislikes living off the land and sets up a big fancy forest camp for all the people of Under. Meanwhile, Bob steals Russell's scout handbook and tries to use its advice to steal the crown.
11	It's All in How You Play	Vernon and Loopy discover that Russell is upset about not making his school football team, and make him part of Under's Joustabout team (like simplified Quidditch on flying snowboards), rigging all the games so Russell would win. But when he discovers this, Bob makes a killing off of gambling bets, and soon moves onto betting the crown of Under on a one-on-one match between him and Russell.
12	No Cape, No Hero	Russell starts masquerading as his comic book hero 'The Coyote' but when no crime presents itself, Vernon starts making unreasonable laws that people can't possibly abide by. Loopy also becomes involved with The Coyote and takes on the role of the villain, 'The Grim'.
13	The Pirates of Hole Island	After accidentally turning Under into pumpernickel, Loopy runs away to be a pirate. Russell, Populah, and Gus go after him and are captured by Loopy's new crewmates. Meanwhile, Vernon tries to stop Bob as he sends rock monkeys to eat Under.
14	Monsteritis	While trying to get down to under, Cliff is bitten by a Frobish, catching Monsteritis and thus turning into a monster himself. Russell goes to the Uncertain City to get the slime of a fairly large Dongo Worm, the only cure for Cliff. Bob and Auntie also want the worm for their own uses, and Gus tries to organize with Captain Darling and the Frags so they can capture the worm together and escape the city before it blinks out of existence.
15	The Scottish Dog and the Everything Log	Gus digs up a dinosaur bone in Up but when he takes it down to Under, Vernon's latest gizmo reanimates it. Gus feels Russell loves the dinosaur more than Russell does Gus, so Loopy takes him to find the Everything Log so he can wish it away. But Auntie had already gone missing looking for it, and Bob decides to try to find it himself too.
16	Blizzard in a Box	In order to make ice cream, Vernon and Loopy set up a factory with a blizzard inside it, causing the outside world to turn into a desert. When Russell decides to get rid of the ice cream in favor of the climate, Bob starts a coup. Meanwhile, Near Under is beset by the petrifying Hairy Eye-Ball, so Auntie and Russell make a deal to for each to solve the problem of the other.
17	The Tower of Derision	Bob uses a monstrous Nossix to take over Under and steal the crown. Russell escapes and heads to the cruel Tower of Derision with Populah to read Great Great Uncle Zeb's advice on beating the Nossix. The Frags, having been outed by the monster, teach Vernon and Loopy how to indirectly disobey Bob's undesirable orders to stop Russell.
18	Brain Jam	Faced with a riddle he can't solve, Vernon breaks down and Russell takes him to the Clockmaker to be fixed. Unfortunately, the Clockmaker won't cooperate, needing Vernon to keep time correctly in his town. Meanwhile, Loopy helps Auntie first stop Bob from demolishing Near Under as part of his "Wire Man" show.
19	A Boy's Best Friend's Enemy	Gus chases a cat to Under and she takes Bob hostage, using him to fly her away from Gus to Near Under, the dog and the Frags (who don't understand the dog-cat feud anyway, believing peace was better) in hot pursuit. However, Auntie First is waging a war with her Cousin Tess, the leader of Under Sea because they once wore the same dress to their school prom. Russell tries to stop the war since all the sea creatures are being forced to flee to Under due to it. However, once Russell saw that the dresses were not the same, the evidence was destroyed.
20	Auntie Gravity	Embarrassed by the prospect of trading party supplies to Hugh the Yu-Yu for her weight in Slyther Cheese, Auntie (with help from Bob) kidnaps Loopy to make her his Lighter Than Air pastries. Without the trade, though, Hugh is faced with a giant rat attack, and Russell must step in to save the economy.
21	Pilfs Did It!	The mouse-like bandits start stealing things in both Under and Up, leading the Wrights to believe the house is infested by rodents. They then call an exterminator and Russell fears the passage to Under will be discovered, he is also blamed by Lou and his mother for the thefts.
22	Not Necessarily Russell	In order to go river rafting, Russell has Vernon create a Veggi-Double clone to attend the G-4 meeting in his stead. But when a Giga Gut attacks Near Under, Auntie First, Cousin Tess and Hugh the Yu-Yu find "Russell" to be no help at all in finding a solution, and the situation worsens when they are informed by Bob Wire that they were dealing with a clone.
23	Luck be a Birdie	When it does its annual flyby to Under, the Bluebird of Happenstance poops on Loopy bestowing him with bad luck and takes off with Russell's crown, leaving a blue feather behind. Loopy locks himself inside a rollable glass ball to stop getting bad luck while Russell tracks down the bluebird. Meanwhile, Auntie causes her subjects to run away again to Under over an unfair "Light Tax" and has to rely on Bob to bring them back when he gets the crown from the bluebird.
24	Ancient Air	When he loots the Uncertain City, Bob comes across three ancient urns. Auntie confiscates one with a freeze-dried Giant Nose (an extinct monster) which comes back to life and starts attacking the towns. Loopy buys an urn filled with ancient air from Bob and releases it in the castle, sending it and everyone inside back to prehistoric times.
25	Feed a Cold	Russell infects all of Under with his cold, turning them all into uppity superheroes who kick Russell and Gus out of the town. Bob and Vernon, being inorganic, were immune. They go to Near Under and Captain Darling tells them a plant native to the Equatorial Glaciers will cure the infected Underites, but Bob tells their plan to the Underites in an attempt to get into their good books. Vernon tries to find the cure for Russell's cold in Up.
26	The Accordion of Doom	Faced with a daunting school recital, Russell has a recurring nightmare about performing the accordion in front of a hoard of monsters. In Under, the Dream Gulper arrives and materializes the dreams of its sleepers. Bob catches the Dream Gulper for his dream of being a giant and ruling all the local kingdoms to come true. Russell has to confront his fears to reach the Dream Gulper and stop Bob's dream from becoming reality forever at sunset.
Season 2
27	Artificial Intelligence	When a month-long solar eclipse takes place in Under, it becomes overrun by Brain Suckers, turning all their victims into mindless drones. They can be "resmartulated" with Vernon's solar-powered Resmartulator, but Bob tricks Vernon into smartulating him without being brain-sucked first, making him a super genius (at least by Bob's standards) and able to successfully take over Under. To stop Bob, Russell also has himself super-smarted, but he becomes conceited and uncaring as a result.
28	Random Opportunity Knocks	Sick of being a hated despot, Auntie goes to the Kiosk of Random Opportunity to get a new job. Auntie becomes a "great big sacrifice" to the Great Big Gehh, a monster terrorizing the Valley of the Outies once defeated by ex-King Cliff. Loopy also gets tired of his job and heads to the Kiosk. When they go to find Loopy, Russell and friends find a light signal of Cliff coming from the Valley of the Outies. (NOTE: This is the first of two episodes in which Bob Wire does not appear, nor do the Frags.)
29	The Lawn of the Lurber	Bob kidnaps the Truth Teller and has the Frags masquerade as her to make him King and to make Russell and Gus disappear. Unfortunately, he chose to act just as the Lurber rose from the ground, intent on eating its only prey: Kings.
30	Good Stenches make Bad Neighbors	The Big Cloud Mall kidnaps Auntie First, the Flatulent Swamp and Under after its Belch-Bean Cookoff in order to keep its engine (which runs on bad smells) running. Russell and friends head to the Mall to save Under but are slowed down by security. Fortunately, Bob, seeing them on the Mall, realizes Under is going to be saved either way and decides to do it himself and earn their undying gratitude.
31	Despot School Confidential	Populah is sent to Miss Atilla's School for Young Despots by Auntie and Tess. With Populah not having any despot edge, she can never graduate. So, Russell, Loopy, and Gus pretend to be girls and sneak into the school to help Populah win the despot derby for Populah for instant graduation. Bob also cross-dresses to get in as a teacher to steal Russell's crown, which had been taken from him when he enrolled.
32	El Spectaculo Del Squumpo	Loopy gives Russell an attachable tail as a King Appreciation Day gift, and Russell uses it to perform acrobatics at the traveling circus (ironically, the one Bob Wire was also working for). Unfortunately, when the circus is summoned to Emperor Lugobrius, they are faced with either making him happy with a good show or get shaved clean and locked away forever (like all the other entertainers who attempted to please him and failed).
33	Slow Plums and Krenits	Auntie First and Loopy are both swindled into getting the Ultimate Defensive Beasts: Krenits, thus both of their populaces had to remain perfectly still or be eaten by the monsters. Russell goes to get the Ultimate Offensive Beast, the Ippy Clippy, to get rid of them, but Bob beats them to the punch and they are locked in the Wall Eye (where the Ippy Clippy had been stored by Great Great Uncle Zeb) with a flotilla of monster guppies.
34	Return of the Moon	After being weighed down by too much garbage the year before, the moon is about to crash into Under. Russell plans to stop it by becoming giant and smacking it away with a tennis racket, but Bob steals the Enlargulator to make a new town for the Underites when the moon crashes, making much profit from the deal.
35	Continent Adrift	To gain favor with the Queen of Throng, Bob reverses the direction that Ahead of Under was moving and thus ends the motion sickness experienced by the continent's populace over the years. Unfortunately, this sent the landmass on a collision course with Under, and Russell has to travel to Ahead of Under and try to set things right before his kingdom's crushed. Meanwhile, Vernon and Populah have to protect Under from the ravenous Bedrock Beasts emerging from Ahead of Under.
36	Escape from Frolicking Island	Russell, Gus and Loopy decide to go on vacation on Frolicking Island, only to find it is not a resort, but a horrible trap ruled over by Happy Fernando and his pain-inducing whistle. Russell works with Captain Darling (who is also trapped with Auntie First on the island) to try to escape. Meanwhile, Vernon creates an Unmeltable Ice Cube that turns all liquid it touches solid, but when he tries to dispose of the dangerous invention, Bob Wire steals it to set up a bogus sales campaign.
37	The Coming of Kleng	Bob's advertisement campaign for the metal polish Kleng has everyone in Under and Near Under mistakenly awaiting an attack by Kleng, believing it to be a fearsome conqueror. When Auntie quickly surrenders her country to Bob before "Kleng" comes, he quickly takes the opportunity to trick Russell as well for his crown. Russell becomes suspicious and tries to find the truth about Kleng.
38	Ride'em Squump Boy	When Under's Squump population gets too old and retires, the irritating Slaphappies move in, forcing Russell to go to the Argyle Flats and rope up another herd, a task only possible by subduing the biggest bull Squump. Bob Wire is also out to get the Squumps and hires some local help to do it.
39	Stolen Voices	Desperate to get Bob out of his funk, the Frags go to the shady swindler Thornhop. He agrees to get the crown and remove Russell from the picture in exchange for Bob's beautiful (singing) voice and the Frags agree. Thornhop installs an unbreakable latch on the portal to Up and refuses to let Russell return home unless he handed over the crown. Bob tries to go back on the deal, but Thornhop steals the new King's voice. Meanwhile, Russell tries to crack the combination lock from his side of the latch.
40	A Glass of Memory	Cliff gets Russell to go to Under and recover his memory of Grade 4, which he forgot after falling into the GeeIForget River on the same day he had hidden the second Crown of Under. Bob was also looking for the second Crown and decides to get Cliff's memory so he could find the Crown and get 50% control over Under. Unable to steal it from the Recollecter at the river's end, Bob then decides to get Russell to get the memory instead then he'd steal it from him. But he remembered that he had set traps all along the river bank to stop Russell, and one of them knocks Russell into the river, making him forget everything.
41	The Monster Who Wouldn't Arrive	When a giant Asymptote appears but stops short of the town, the Underites start panicking, and Vernon goes dangerously Babbleyboing. To stop him from exploding, Russell takes him to the Clockmaker, who now lives in the Bottomless Pit. Unfortunately, the Clockmaker gave all his belongings to his love Flavia, and as such will be unable to fix Vernon until he marries her. Meanwhile, Loopy and Gus try to get rid of the Asymptote, with Bob (who is making a killing in the therapeutic business) fouling them up at every turn.
42	The Museum of Tomorrow	As an alien fleet approaches Under, Russell is arrested by Agent Greg and his Future Infractions Bureau for a crime he has yet to commit. The others head to the Museum of Tomorrow to try to find out what crime he will commit but are arrested themselves for planning on breaking Russell out of jail. Gus has everyone speak in past tense instead of future tense so they won't be caught again, and he and Russell escape with the help of Vernon, Loopy, and Populah, and head to the Museum to visit the future. (Note: This is the second—and final—episode in which Bob Wire does not appear, nor do the Frags. In fact, it is the only episode in which none of the main antagonists of the series appear.)
43	Treasure of the Zinkas	When he overhears that she needs money and is going to sell the house, Russell goes to Under to find some treasure for his mother instead. He and his friends head out to collect the Orb of the Zinkas, an extinct sugar-loving culture. Bob tries to stop Russell, believing if Under got a new King, he'd stand a better chance of stealing the Crown.
44	Run Russell Run	During the live production of Bob's new TV talk show, Auntie's prized Charismango Tree disappears and she wrongly accuses her new Thorch of eating it. Russell decides to save the Thorch and bring it back to its forest home, but Auntie hires the famous tracker Mr. Queep to get it back. Meanwhile, Vernon and Loopy try to find the real culprit, with Bob, the Frags, Hugh the Yu-Yu, and Cousin Tess as their main suspects.
45	The Egg Effect	Loopy "trespasses" in Near Under while picking flowers, causing Auntie to declare war. Russell calls for a truce but when they meet at the peace talk, Bob has them eaten by a Gurd, which turns them into eggs. When Russell hatches he becomes obsessed with getting to the top of Unclimbabale Mountain, but the Troll who owns it tries to stop him. When Auntie hatches she becomes infatuated with Loopy and puts him in a cage, he then asks her to get the Crown for him, since he saw that Bob had stolen it from the preoccupied Russell.
46	Russell Thussle Tussle	The Frags are forced to join Loopy as Gopher scouts for their community service hours and together they steal the last Thussle bush, which had been causing a war (both the Red and Yellow Floronians wanted it). They give it to Bob Wire to keep safe, and he tells the Floronians that Russell has it causing them to attack Under. Bob tells Russell he will give it back and end the siege if he gets the crown, however, Captain Darling decides to use the Thussle as a Despot Day gift to Auntie First.
47	King Russell the Repellant	Scared of a storm, Gus has Russell go down to Under where the Horrorborealis is filling the skies, turning everyone organic (i.e. not Vernon and Bob) into pickle-obsessed Ghouls. Russell, Gus, and Bob get hit by lightning and are negatively charged, protecting them from everything even turning into Ghouls. Russell decided to go to the West Pole where his charge will be neutralized, and end the Horrorborelais as well, allowing everyone to return to normal. Bob, however, gets himself positively charged and threatens to neutralize Russell himself unless he gets the crown, but Gus ends up turning into a Ghoul. Meanwhile, back in Under, Vernon has to eat all the pickles so the Ghouls can't themselves, as that would make them remain in their monstrous state forever.
48	As Good As Gus	Bob kidnaps Gus and Loopy, sending them floating away to Dessert Island where they are beset by ravenous Sea Scarfs. He then has a Shapeshifter turn into Gus to steal the Crown, but the plan is disrupted when Russell and the Shapeshifter have to save Vernon from a nest of baby Geets.
49	Thoosh Got Mail	The Kingdom inspector is making his rounds and Vernon, Populah and Loopy are cleaning up Under in preparation, kicking everyone out. If the kingdom's dirty, then Russell will lose his crown, so Bob sets out to turn the town into a dump. Unknowingly Auntie First uses an obscure legal loophole to swap ownerships of hers and Russell's kingdoms, leaving Vernon and Loopy to clean up filthy Near Under in a few mere hours. Meanwhile, Russell, Gus, and Populah have to get the last stamp required in Under's Stamp Collection from Elpsun C's post office (without which he will lose his crown also).
50	Terrier of the Ocean	Auntie gets a Spitesucker stuck to her face when she visits Bob's Aqua Zoo, forcing Captain Darling to make a deal with Cousin Tess to get it off. Unfortunately, once she was freed, Auntie couldn't remember being sucked and was forced to try Darling and Tess for treason. Meanwhile, Russell also visits Bob's Zoo and gets attacked by a Plurn. Gus saves Russell but the Plurn inks him, turning him into an aquatic animal. Russell goes to ask Tess how he can get Gus back to normal (leaving the finned dog with Bob and Loopy, who put him on the show), but Tess refuses to help Russell until he wins her and Darling's trial.
51	If This, Then That	Loopy accidentally activates the jetpack Vernon was making Russell and rockets away to a distant village of Iples who dub him their "Great Decider" (they can't make decisions themselves). Meanwhile, Populah's hair has been turned into snakes by Auntie's shampoo, and Auntie won't share the antidote unless Russell gets her a date with Mr. Queep. Queep agrees to go on the date once he has captured a Nonifer up in the monster-infested NotVeryKnown River, but his canoe sinks at the port. Gus volunteers Russell's King Ship and they accompany Mr. Queep on his quest, along with Bob and the Frags, looking for a story to sell their tabloid, the Hotwire.
52	Gag Pune Gets Out (series finale)	Bob Wire releases Gag Pune from Mount Stoney Lonesome, where he was imprisoned in when Cliff was King. Gag was imprisoned in the mountain after going on a rampage after being laughed at by Cliff, Bob, and the inhabitants of Under during a festival. Bob freed Gag because he knows the first thing he'll do is head to Under to destroy the place and Russell will have no choice but to get Cliff's help, and the price will be the Crown of Under. Meanwhile, Loopy needs to get his nose bell fixed and we learn that he's more than just the court jester...
