= Mark Rendall =

Canadian actor

- Born: October 21, 1988 (age 37); Toronto, Ontario, Canada
- Occupation: Actor
- Years active: 1999–present

Mark Rendall (born October 21, 1988) is a Canadian film, television, and voice actor whose roles include the lead in the 2004 film, Childstar and Mick in season 1 of the Canadian television drama series ReGenesis. He played Bastian Bux in the television series, Tales from the Neverending Story, and the title character in The Interrogation of Michael Crowe. He has also done voice work for the television series Jane and the Dragon and Time Warp Trio, and starred as the title character in the popular PBS Kids TV series Arthur (seasons 7–8). Recently, Rendall has appeared in several Hollywood films.

== Early life ==
Rendall was born in Toronto, the son of Catherine (née Sachs), a watercolour artist and Henry Rendall, an advertising agent. He has two older brothers, David, who is also an actor and Matthew. His father is Jewish while his mother is Christian and he celebrates both Jewish and Christian holidays.

== Career ==
Rendall started acting at the age of ten, when he asked his parents if he could try his hand at acting. At about that time, the Cameron Maclntosh London touring production of the musical "Oliver" was holding auditions for children. Although he had no formal training in either acting or singing, Rendall was cast in the role of Spider, and as understudy to the lead role, Oliver.

He later starred in several films, including The Impossible Elephant, Tales from the Neverending Story (for which he received a 2002 Gemini nomination), the multi-award-winning Touching Wild Horses (2002) opposite Jane Seymour (for which he received a 2003 Young Artists Award nomination), Disney's The Scream Team with Eric Idle, the Court TV Peabody Award-winning true story, The Interrogation of Michael Crowe (for which he received a 2004 ACTRA Award nomination for Outstanding Performance - Male), Don McKellar's dark comedy Childstar (2004), opposite Jennifer Jason Leigh, Eric Stoltz and Dave Foley; the title role in Spirit Bear: The Simon Jackson Story (2004) with Ed Begley, Jr. and Graham Greene, NBC's mini-series Revelations (2005) opposite Bill Pullman and Natascha MacElhone, and Francois Girard's Silk. In 2013, he played the lead role in the Canadian film Algonquin, shown at Montreal Film Festival.

Rendall played supporting roles in the films 30 Days of Night, opposite Josh Hartnett and Melissa George, and Charlie Bartlett, with Anton Yelchin and Kat Dennings. In 2009, he starred in the films, Victoria Day, directed by David Bezmozgis and The Exploding Girl, directed by Bradley Rust Gray.

=== Voice acting ===
After Justin Bradley ended voicing Arthur, Rendall took his place for Seasons 7 and 8. He also redubbed Bradley's voice as the title character in Season 6.

In 2003, he voiced Noodle in the first season of the children's series The Save-Ums!.

In 2005, he voiced 14-year-old Jester in the Canadian-New Zealand CGI animated series Jane and the Dragon. He has also provided voices for other animated shows, namely King, Time Warp Trio, and Wayside.

=== Music ===
In August 2021, Rendall and Elliot Page released three home recorded, low-fidelity tracks and gave them away on Bandcamp.

== Filmography ==
Year	Title	Role	Notes
2000	The War Next Door	Lucas Smith	3 episodes
2000	Yo Awesome Awesome!	Kid	Episode: "Dirty Knees"
2001	Tales from the Neverending Story	Bastian Balthazar Bux	
2001	The Impossible Elephant	Daniel Harris	
2001	Screech Owls	Brandon Williams	Episode: "Dead on Arrival"
2001	Beyblade	Nicky, Boy	Voice, episode: "A Star is Born"
2002	The Scream Team	Ian Carlyle	
2002	The Interrogation of Michael Crowe	Michael Crowe	
2002	Arthur It's Only Rock 'n' Roll	Arthur Read	Voice, TV film
2002–2003	Arthur	Arthur Read	Voice, 20 episodes; seasons 7 and 8
2003	Open House	Travis Morrow	
2003	Blizzard	Joe	
2003	The Save-Ums!	Noodle	Voice, season 1
2003	Ghost Cat	Pearson Shawn	
2003–2005	King	Russell Wright	Voice, main role
2004	A Different Loyalty	Oliver Cauffied	
2004	Childstar	Taylor Brandon Burns	
2004	The Winning Season	Joe Soshack	
2004–2010	Franny's Feet	Additional voices	6 episodes
2005	Spirit Bear: The Simon Jackson Story	Simon Jackson	
2005–2006	Time Warp Trio	Joe Arthur	Voice, main role
2007–2008	Wayside	Todd	Voice, main role
2006	Len and Hugo	Len	
2006	Jane and the Dragon	Jester	26 episodes
2007	30 Days of Night	Jake Oleson	
2007	Charlie Bartlett	Kip Crombwell	
2007	Silk	Ludovic Berbek	
2009	Victoria Day	Ben Spektor	
2009	The Exploding Girl	Al	
2009	My One and Only	Robbie	
2009	Year of the Carnivore	Eugene Zaslavsky	
2013	Hannibal	Nicholas Boyle	
2013	The Bird Men	Ben	
2013	Algonquin	Jake Roulette	
2016	The History of Love	Young Léo Gursky	
2016	Murdoch Mysteries	Mr. Foley	Episode: "The Devil Inside"
2017	Versailles	Thomas Beaumont	
2017	Shimmer Lake	Chris Morrow	
2017	We Forgot to Break Up	Lugh	
2018	Stockholm	Elov Eriksson	
2020	Dead Still	Percy Cummins	
2020	No Good Deed	Jeremy	
2024	The Apprentice	Roger Stone	
2025	Ginny & Georgia	Mr. Kay	5 episodes

Preceded by Justin Bradley	Voice of Arthur Read; 2001-2003	Succeeded by Cameron Ansell
