= Justin Bradley =

Canadian actor

- Born: September 1985 (age 41); Montreal, Quebec, Canada
- Occupation: Actor
- Years active: 1992–present
- Known for: The Little Lulu Show (1998); Arthur (2001); Naturally Sadie (2005-2007)

Justin Bradley is a Canadian actor.

== Early life ==
Bradley was born in Montreal to Barbara (née Hellings) and Jonathan Bradley, who was born in British Guiana. He started his career at the age of six, modelling in various department store advertisements. Bradley also appeared in commercials for McDonald's, Danone, and Canadian Tire as a child.

== Career ==
Bradley voiced Arthur Read in 2001 during the sixth season of the children's animated series, Arthur, following the departure of Michael Yarmush. However, the producers found his voice to be too deep so the season was redubbed with his successor, Mark Rendall. He also voiced Tommy in the Cinelume dub of the Italian animated TV series Tommy and Oscar, Manny Escobar in Fred's Head, and supplying the voice of Charley Bones (a.k.a. Zapman) in the children's animation, Mona the Vampire. He also had a recurring role in the short-lived CW drama The Beautiful Life.

Bradley appeared on camera in such films and programs as Are You Afraid of the Dark?, Dead at 17, Lassie, Who Gets the House?, Kart Racer, Waking the Dead, Mental Block, Galidor: Defenders of the Outer Dimension, Eternal, One Eyed King, Redeemable in Merchandise, and Warm Bodies.

He also was the voice of Eddie in the HBO children's cartoon television series The Little Lulu Show, Jesse McCoy in the second season of The Kids from Room 402, Raffi in the animated series My Life Me and the boy in the animated film Eye of the Wolf as well as several additional characters in Delilah and Julius, A Miss Mallard Mystery, For Better or For Worse, The Country Mouse and the City Mouse Adventures, Simon in the Land of Chalk Drawings, Sagwa, the Chinese Siamese Cat, Rotten Ralph, and Caillou.

He also co-starred in the children's television series Naturally, Sadie as Hal Hawthorne, Sadie's older brother.

== Filmography ==
=== Film ===
Year	Title	Role	Notes
1998	Little Men	Dolly Pettinghill	
1999	Who Gets the House?	Brett	
2000	Waking the Dead	Adopted Kid from Letter	
2000	Believe	Owen	
2001	One Eyed King	Young Frankie	
2003	Kart Racer	Nick Curcio	
2003	Redeemable in Merchandise	Alex	Short film
2004	Eternal	Teenage Basketball Boy	
2009	The Trotsky	Jimmy	
2009	Dead like Me: Life After Death	Football Player	
2011	Beastly	Student	
2013	Warm Bodies	Unknown	Uncredited
2024	Darkness of Man	Dennis	

=== Television ===
Year	Title	Role	Notes
1995–1999	The Little Lulu Show	Eddie	52 episodes
1997–1999	The Country Mouse and the City Mouse Adventures	Various	25 episodes
1998	Captive	School Boy	Television film
1999	Are You Afraid of the Dark?	David	Episode: "The Tale of the Gruesome Gourmets"
1999	Tommy & Oscar	Voice	26 episodes
1999	Lassie	First Kid	Episode: "That Boy-Girl Thing"
1999–2001	Rotten Ralph	Kid / Additional voices	41 episodes
1999–2002	Mona the Vampire	Charley "Zapman" Bones	52 episodes
2000	The Twins	Mikey	Episode: "Where's Snaily?"
2001	The Sign of Four	Captain's Son	Television film
2001	Arthur	Arthur Read	8 episodes
2002	Sagwa, the Chinese Siamese Cat	Tetsu	Episode: "The Jade Rabbit / Dongwa's Best Friend"
2002	Galidor: Defenders of the Outer Dimension	Nicky	Episode: "A Tale of Two Nicks"
2003–2004	Mental Block	Skipper	26 episodes
2005–2007	Naturally, Sadie	Hal / Kal Hawthorne	63 episodes
2005–2008	Delilah & Julius	Voice	31 episodes
2008	Dead at 17	Gabe Masterson	Television film
2008	Fred's Head	Manny Escobar	13 episodes
2008	Picture This	Mikey Carson	Television film
2010	My Life Me	Raffi	Episode: "Misconcepted Deceptions"
2013	Being Human	RJ Sergeant	Episode: "I'm So Lonesome I Could Die"

Preceded by Michael Yarmush	Voice of Arthur Read; 2001	Succeeded by Mark Rendall
