= Maveth =

- Agents of S.H.I.E.L.D. episode
- Episode no.: Season 3 Episode 10
- Directed by: Vincent Misiano
- Written by: Jeffrey Bell
- Cinematography by: Allan Westbrook
- Editing by: Joshua Charson; Jennifer MacFarlane
- Original air date: December 8, 2015
- Running time: 43 minutes

Guest appearances
- Powers Boothe as Gideon Malick; Constance Zimmer as Rosalind Price; Mark Dacascos as Giyera; Dillon Casey as Will Daniels; Blair Underwood as Andrew Garner; Juan Pablo Raba as Joey Gutierrez

Episode chronology
← Previous "Closure"	Next → "Bouncing Back"
- Agents of S.H.I.E.L.D. season 3

"Maveth" is the tenth episode of the third season of the American television series Agents of S.H.I.E.L.D. Based on the Marvel Comics organization S.H.I.E.L.D., it follows Phil Coulson and his team of S.H.I.E.L.D. agents as they fight to stop Hydra from bringing an ancient Inhuman through an alien portal. It is set in the Marvel Cinematic Universe (MCU) and acknowledges the franchise's films. The episode was written by Jeffrey Bell, and directed by Vincent Misiano.

Clark Gregg reprises his role as Coulson from the film series, and is joined by series regulars Ming-Na Wen, Brett Dalton, Chloe Bennet, Iain De Caestecker, Elizabeth Henstridge, Nick Blood, Adrianne Palicki, Henry Simmons, and Luke Mitchell.

"Maveth" originally aired on ABC on December 8, 2015, and according to Nielsen Media Research, was watched by 3.85 million viewers.

== Plot ==
Following the events of "Closure", Grant Ward's team find an ancient statue in the shape of the Hydra symbol on Maveth, the deserted planet opened through the Monolith. They find Will Daniels, and Leo Fitz convinces Ward to let Will guide them through the wasteland to the point where the portal will reopen. Phil Coulson regains consciousness and pursues the team, and after Will leads the Hydra agents into a storm so he and Fitz can escape, Coulson kills the soldiers and wounds Ward, forcing him to help find Fitz and Will.

Back on Earth, Alphonso "Mack" Mackenzie leads two teams into the castle to secure the portal and rescue Coulson, Fitz and Jemma Simmons, as well as Hydra's captive Inhumans, who have been brought in by Gideon Malick. Mack goes with Lance Hunter and Bobbi Morse, while Daisy Johnson goes with Melinda May, Lincoln Campbell and Joey Gutierrez. Lincoln causes a power failure, during which Simmons escapes and finds the captive Inhumans, including Andrew Garner. She reluctantly releases him to fight the Hydra agents trying to recapture her, but he also murders the other Inhumans. While Mack, Hunter and Morse seize the portal chamber, May finds Simmons and learns of Andrew's escape, and Joey saves Daisy from Giyera by melting three bullets, who is incapacitated by Lincoln. Mack orders the other agents to leave and to destroy the castle so that the monster cannot escape Maveth, but Daisy refuses to leave him behind.

Fitz and Will come across the ruins of an ancient civilization, and Will explains that the inhabitants of Maveth "feared change" and warred among themselves, until they destroyed each other. When Will trips, Fitz stops to help the wound on his leg, only to find its bone exposed. His first-hand knowledge leads Fitz to realize that he is in fact the monster, inhabiting the reanimated body of Will, who actually died saving Simmons from it. (Note: During her escape in "4,722 Hours".) "Will" attacks Fitz as Coulson finds them, but when he shoots "Will" several times to save Fitz, Ward attacks him. The castle machinery automatically reopens the portal, and Fitz prevents "Will" from escaping through it by destroying Will's body with a flare gun. Coulson overpowers Ward and crushes his chest with his prosthetic hand, killing him. Returning to Earth through the portal, Coulson and Fitz escape with Mack and Daisy, as May destroys the castle with the Zephyr's missiles. The team return to air base where Simmons hugs Fitz over the loss of Will, and Lincoln kisses Daisy. Coulson shares a look with Fitz, referencing to the death of Ward on Maveth. However, the monster takes over Ward's body and reaches Earth before the portal closes, and is encountered by a fleeing Malick.

== Production ==
=== Development ===
In November 2015, Marvel announced that the tenth episode of the season would be titled "Maveth", to be written by executive producer Jeffrey Bell, with Vincent Misiano directing.

=== Casting ===
In November 2015, Marvel revealed that main cast members Clark Gregg, Ming-Na Wen, Brett Dalton, Chloe Bennet, Iain De Caestecker, Elizabeth Henstridge, Nick Blood, Adrianne Palicki, Henry Simmons, and Luke Mitchell would star as Phil Coulson, Melinda May, Grant Ward, Daisy Johnson, Leo Fitz, Jemma Simmons, Lance Hunter, Bobbi Morse, Alphonso "Mack" Mackenzie, and Lincoln Campbell, respectively. It was also revealed that the guest cast for the episode would include Blair Underwood as Andrew Garner, Constance Zimmer as Rosalind Price, Juan Pablo Raba as Joey Gutierrez, Powers Boothe as Gideon Malick, Mark Dacascos as Giyera, Garrett Hines as Hydra soldier and Brandon Ford Green as third soldier. Hines and Green did not receive guest star credit in the episode. Underwood, Zimmer, Raba, Boothe, and Dacascos reprise their roles from earlier in the series. Dillon Casey also guest stars, reprising his role as Will Daniels from "4,722 Hours".

=== Filming ===
Filming for the alien planet occurred in a work quarry in Simi Valley as well as around the Mojave Desert near Northridge, Los Angeles.

=== Music ===
Composer Bear McCreary worked with a larger orchestra than usual for "Maveth", a 90-piece orchestra rather than the usual 50 or 70 players required for the series. The score was recorded at the Newman Scoring Stage on the 20th Century Fox lot on the Saturday after Thanksgiving. McCreary called the episode "a crossroads between old and new storylines. At least a half dozen important musical themes were incorporated throughout the episode, including two new themes I introduced to represent new characters."

== Broadcast ==
"Maveth" was first aired in the United States on ABC on December 8, 2015.

== Reception ==
=== Ratings ===
In the United States the episode received a 1.3/4 percent share among adults between the ages of 18 and 49, meaning that it was seen by 1.3 percent of all households, and 4 percent of all of those watching television at the time of the broadcast. It was watched by 3.85 million viewers.
