= Spirit Bear: The Simon Jackson Story =

2005 television film

- Written by: Kent Staines
- Directed by: Stefan Scaini
- Starring: Mark Rendall; Graham Greene; Katie Stuart; Ed Begley, Jr.
- Country of origin: Canada
- Original language: English

Production
- Running time: 92 minutes
- Production company: Screen Door

Original release
- Release: 2005

Spirit Bear: The Simon Jackson Story is a 2005 independent Canadian film based on the real life campaign by Spirit Bear Youth Coalition founder Simon Jackson to save the habitat of the Kermode bear. It stars Mark Rendall as Jackson, Katie Stuart as his love interest, Graham Greene, and Ed Begley, Jr.

== Plot ==
Simon Jackson is an awkward high school teenager who befriends a white bear that saves his life. He learns that the bear is endangered by the destruction of its habitat from logging and grows out of his shell to launch a campaign to the government to protect the bear. He then learns about the hardships of a campaign but succeeds with the help of his friend, Lloyd Blackburn, and his supporters. The movie is based on Simon Jackson and his help with protecting the spirit bear in real life.

== Awards ==
The movie won the Audience Choice Award for Best Feature Film at the Sprockets children's film festival in 2005.
