= Remedy (TV series) =

Canadian medical drama TV series

- TV series poster
- Genre: Medical Drama; Family drama
- Created by: Greg Spottiswood
- Starring: Enrico Colantoni; Sara Canning; Dillon Casey; Genelle Williams; Sarah Allen; Matt Ward; Patrick McKenna; Martha Burns; Niall Matter
- Country of origin: Canada
- No. of seasons: 2
- No. of episodes: 20

Production
- Executive producers: Greg Spottiswood; Bernie Zukerman; Kelly Makin; Adam Barken
- Producer: Jan Peter Meyboom
- Production company: Indian Grove Productions

Original release
- Network: Global (Canada); Ovation (United States)
- Release: February 24, 2014 – May 19, 2015

Remedy is a Canadian medical drama series which premiered on Global on February 24, 2014. It ran for two seasons.

The series starred Dillon Casey as Griffin Conner, a medical school dropout working as an orderly at the fictional Bethune General Hospital in Toronto, where his father Allen (Enrico Colantoni) is the chief of medical staff. The cast also included Genelle Williams, Sara Canning, Sarah Allen, Patrick McKenna, Catherine Disher, Matt Ward, Martha Burns and Niall Matter.

The series was produced by Indian Grove Productions. Production and casting were announced in fall 2013. On May 1, 2014, Global announced that Remedy had been renewed for a 10 episode second season. On May 22, 2015, show creator Greg Spottiswood tweeted that Global had cancelled Remedy.

== Plot ==
The series follows Griffin Conner (Dillon Casey), son of the Chief of Staff (Enrico Colantoni), brother to both a surgeon (Sara Canning) and a nurse (Sarah Allen), and now—medical school dropout. Having been kicked out in a haze of disgrace, Griffin is forced to return to Bethune General Hospital as its newest porter, where he gets a new perspective on a world he thought he knew through a colourful cast of cleaners, project aides, transport workers, and more.

Season two kicks off nine months after the finale with each member of the Conner family pulled out of their comfort zones and Bethune Hospital in the midst of a colossal shake up. Griffin Conner seems to finally be getting his life on track with plans to return to medical school and a serious girlfriend, but his dark and troubled past continues to haunt him. Meanwhile, Allen must re-adjust following his demotion from Chief-of-Staff, while his daughters –surgeon Mel and new mom Sandy – search to balance co-parenting baby Maya with work and play. This season also sees the introduction of new ER Resident Dr Cutler (played by Niall Matter), who is set to stir things up for the Conners.

== Cast and characters ==
=== Main ===
- Dillon Casey as Griffin Conner
- Sara Canning as Dr. Melissa Conner
- Enrico Colantoni as Dr. Allen Conner, acting chief of staff and father of the Conner family
- Sarah Allen as Sandy Conner
- Matt Ward as Dr. Brian Decker, doctor and former fiancé of Sandy Conner (season 1)
- Martha Burns as Rebecca Baker, a lawyer and matriarch of the Conner family
- Genelle Williams as Zoe Rivera
- Diego Fuentes as Bruno Dias
- Stephanie Belding as Lonnie Masterson
- Patrick McKenna as Frank Kanaskie
- Niall Matter as Dr. Peter Cutler, heartthrob ER resident who shamelessly ruffles feathers and turns heads throughout the halls of Beth-H (season 2)

=== Recurring ===
- Catherine Disher as Linda Tuttle, an ICU doctor who is promoted to Chief of Staff when Allen loses the position.
- Brendan Gall as Jerry, an anesthetist and Melissa's brief love interest.
- Laara Sadiq as Dr. Summers, the lead ER doctor.
- Anusree Roy as Nurse Patel, an ER nurse.
- Ann Pirvu as Josey the Therapeutic Clown.

== Episodes ==
=== Series overview ===
| Season | Episodes | Originally aired | |
| Season | Episodes | First aired | Last aired |
|---|---|---|---|
| 1 | 10 | February 24, 2014 | April 28, 2014 |
| 2 | 10 | March 23, 2015 | May 19, 2015 |

=== Season 1 (2014) ===
| No. overall | No. in season | Title | Directed by | Written by | Original release date | Prod. code | CAN viewers (millions) |
|---|---|---|---|---|---|---|---|
| 1 | 1 | "Bad Blood" | Kelly Makin | Greg Spottiswood | February 24, 2014 | 239391-1 | 0.754 |
The Conner family is thrown back together in a haze of blood and confusion, as prodigal son Griffin returns to his second family home - Bethune General Hospital.
| 2 | 2 | "The Homecoming" | Kelly Makin | Greg Spottiswood | March 3, 2014 | 239391-2 | 0.807 |
Griffin's first day as Bethune's newest porter is a rocky one, while Melissa forges an unlikely connection with the sister of a patient whose life she is scrambling to save.
| 3 | 3 | "Testing, Testing" | Don McBrearty | Kate Melville | March 10, 2014 | 239391-3 | 0.687 |
Brian resolves to improve his patient interaction after receiving several complaints, while Griffin forms an unlikely bond with a cantankerous war veteran.
| 4 | 4 | "Shift/Change" | Don McBrearty | Alison Lea Bingeman | March 17, 2014 | 239391-4 | 0.709 |
When two babies die of a mysterious infection in the Paediatric ICU, Allen scrambles to find patient zero before Bethune General suffers a full-blown outbreak.
| 5 | 5 | "The Beast Within" | Cal Coons | Sandra Chwialkowska | March 24, 2014 | 239391-5 | 0.741 |
A patient's splitting headache leads to an apparent psychotic breakdown and a terrifying seizure; after a violent kick to the belly, Sandy experiences serious pain and is terrified for her baby.
| 6 | 6 | "Scary Bears" | Enrico Colantoni | Adam Barken | March 31, 2014 | 239391-6 | 1.013 |
An offhand comment from Allen sends Melissa into a tailspin, while Brian desperately tries to atone for a past mistake. Natasha is back to get in between Zoe and Griff.
| 7 | 7 | "Tomorrow the Green Grass" | David Frazee | John Callaghan | April 7, 2014 | 239391-7 | 0.743 |
When Rebecca is brought into the ER with a mysterious paralysis creeping up her body, Allen has to scramble to find out what's happening before it's too late.
| 8 | 8 | "Shadow of Doubt" | Kelly Makin | Sandra Chwialkowska | April 14, 2014 | 239391-8 | 1.061 |
Griffin starts to spin out of control after a harrowing car accident evokes a traumatic event from his past and Bruno gives Mel some vital tips on purse string suturing.
| 9 | 9 | "The Little Things" | Cal Coons | Adam Barken | April 21, 2014 | 239391-9 | 0.752 |
Brian and Sandy's wedding is fast approaching, and the families meet for the first time. But will everything go off without a hitch?
| 10 | 10 | "Quit the Horizon" | Kelly Makin | John Callaghan & Greg Spottiswood | April 28, 2014 | 239391-10 | 0.734 |
Sandy struggles to say goodbye to Brian as her reconfigured family rally around to support her.

=== Season 2 (2015) ===
| No. overall | No. in season | Title | Directed by | Written by | Original release date | Prod. code | CAN viewers (millions) |
|---|---|---|---|---|---|---|---|
| 11 | 1 | "Our Friend, Chaos" | Stefan Pleszczynski | Greg Spottiswood | March 23, 2015 | 254801-1 | 0.538 |
An explosion rips through the downstairs of Beth-H, changing lives there forever.
| 12 | 2 | "When You Awake" | Stefan Pleszczynski | John Callahan | March 30, 2015 | 254801-10 | 0.550 |
When an injured firefighter develops curious and frightening post-op symptoms, Mel and Jerry clash over how to proceed.
| 13 | 3 | "Playing Doctor Conner" | Jeff Renfroe | Greg Nelson | April 6, 2015 | 254801-9 | N/A |
Griffin Conner is forced to account for his actions when a patient dies while under his supervision.
| 14 | 4 | "Blood and Guts" | Jeff Renfroe | Ellen Vanstone | April 13, 2015 | 254801-8 | 0.562 |
Allen performs an extraordinarily rare and dangerous medical procedure, and Zoe’s mother turns up at Beth-H unexpectedly.
| 15 | 5 | "Life in Technicolour" | Cal Coons | Meredith Vuchnich | April 20, 2015 | 254801-7 | N/A |
Exhilarated by her new romance with Cutler, Mel is uncharacteristically reckless in the operating room.
| 16 | 6 | "Secrets and Lies" | Enrico Colantoni | David Barlow | April 27, 2015 | 254801-6 | 0.608 |
Cutler is drawn into a critical case with a husband and wife who are at odds over the treatment of her unexplained illness.
| 17 | 7 | "Everything in Moderation" | Anne Wheeler | Tamara Moulin and Ellen Vanstone | May 4, 2015 | 254801-5 | N/A |
Allen works to diagnose a reclusive young woman’s illness, while Griffin begins to come apart at the seams.
| 18 | 8 | "Looking For Satellites" | Stephen Reizes | John Callaghan and Greg Spottiswood | May 11, 2015 | 254801-4 | N/A |
Mel explores the significance of a literal and figurative broken heart, while Griffin embarks on a drug-fueled odyssey.
| 19 | 9 | "Fight or Flight" | Kelly Makin | Greg Nelson | May 19, 2015 | 254801-3 | N/A |
A clumsy attempt at addressing Griffin’s drug problem pushes him further down the spiral.
| 20 | 10 | "Day One" | David Frazee | John Callaghan and Greg Spottiswood | May 19, 2015 | 254801-2 | N/A |
Mel does everything in her power to save a gravely wounded Sandy, while Griffin finally confronts the reality of his addiction.

=== International ===
The American network Ovation began to air the series on January 11, 2021.

== Awards and nominations ==
=== Canadian Screen Awards ===
| Year | Category | Nominee | Result | Ref |
|---|---|---|---|---|
| 2015 | Best Dramatic Series | Greg Spottiswood, Bernard Zukerman | Nominated | |
| 2015 | Best Performance by an Actor in a Continuing Leading Dramatic Role | Dillon Casey | Nominated | |
| 2015 | Best Performance in a Guest Role, Dramatic Series | Nicola Correia-Damude | Nominated | |
| 2015 | Best Production Design or Art Direction in a Fiction Program or Series | Oleg Savytski | Nominated | |
| 2016 | Best Performance by an Actress in a Featured Supporting Role in a Dramatic Program or Series | Martha Burns | Nominated | |
| 2016 | Best Performance in a Guest Role, Dramatic Series | Christine Horne | Won | |

=== Directors Guild of Canada Awards ===
| Year | Category | Nominee | Result | Ref |
|---|---|---|---|---|
| 2014 | Best Picture Editing - Television Series | Lisa Grootenboer | Nominated | |

=== Young Entertainer Awards ===
| Year | Category | Nominee | Result | Ref |
|---|---|---|---|---|
| 2016 | Best Guest Starring Young Actor 12 to 14 - Television Series | Brendan Heard | Nominated | |
