= Victoria Sanchez (actress) =

Canadian actress (born 1976)

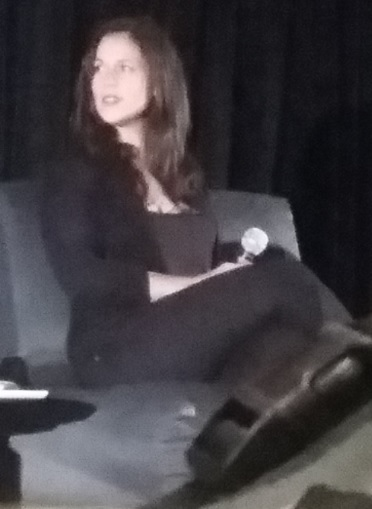
- Victoria Sanchez at Montreal Comiccon 2016
- Born: January 24, 1976 (age 50); Canary Islands, Spain
- Occupation: Actor
- Years active: 1990 - present

Victoria Sanchez (born 24 January 1976) is a Canadian actress. She has appeared in more than forty films since 1990.

== Personal life ==
Sanchez has a brother, Federico; the co-writer and director of Eternal. Her cousin is actor Liche Ariza.

== Filmography ==
=== Film ===
Year	Title	Role	Notes
1998	Sublet	Daphne	
1999	Perpetrators of the Crime	Pauline	
2000	La promesse	Victoria	Short
2000	Saint Jude	Maureen	
2001	Wolf Girl	Tara the Wolf Girl	
2004	Pact with the Devil	Mariella Steiner	
2004	Eternal	Irina	
2013	Algonquin	Carmen	
2015	The Badge	Sarah Richards	

=== Television ===
Year	Title	Role	Notes
1990	Watatatow	Rebecca	TV series
1997-99	Student Bodies	Grace Vasquez	Main role
1998	Big Bear	Kelly McLean / Kitty McLean	TV miniseries
1999	P.T. Barnum	Helen Barnum	TV film
1999	The Hunger	Rachel	"Triangle in Steel"
2000	Satan's School for Girls	Lisa Bagley	TV film
2000	Big Wolf on Campus	Melissa Gorgonopolis / Medusa	"She Will, She Will Rock You"
2001	Tales from the Neverending Story	Xayide	Recurring role
2001	Largo Winch	Vanessa Ovronnaz	"AKA: Vanessa", "Contessa Vanessa"
2002	Bliss	Sarah	"The Footpath of Pink Roses"
2002	Undressed	Frannie	TV series
2004	Naked Josh	Lanie	"Do Not Resuscitate"
2004	When Angels Come to Town	Dolores Pineda	TV film
2004-05	This Is Wonderland	Claudia Ortega	Recurring role
2005	Choice: The Henry Morgentaler Story	Carmen Morgentaler	TV film
2006	Flirting with Danger	Gloria Moretti	TV film
2006	15/Love	Dr. Natasha Alba	"Lucas in the Sky", "Charity of Fire"
2008	The Watch	Sophie / Polly	TV film
2008	You Belong to Me	Denise Fisher	TV film
2009	The Future Life of Jake	Kristi	TV film
2010	Tangled	Ruth Langley	TV film
2015	Le berceau des anges	Theresa Bagatta	TV miniseries
2015-16	This Life	Béatrice Ledoux	Recurring role
2016	Real Detective	Linda Mills	"Redemption"
2016	A Stranger in My Home	Jenny	"Deadly Love Nest"
2017	Bellevue	Maggie Sweetland	Main role
2018, 2023	Jack Ryan	Layla Navarro	Recurring role

=== Video games ===
Year	Title	Role	Notes
2005	Far Cry Instincts	Kade	voice
2010	Tom Clancy's Splinter Cell: Conviction	Sarah Fisher	voice
2013	Deus Ex: The Fall	Alejandra Vega	voice
2013	Tom Clancy's Splinter Cell: Blacklist	Sarah Fisher	voice
2014	Civilization: Beyond Earth	Suzanne Marjorie Fielding	voice
2016	Deus Ex: Mankind Divided	Alejandra Vega	voice and performance capture
2019	The Outer Worlds	Ellie Fenhill	voice
