= Algonquin (film) =

- Poster
- Directed by: Jonathan Hayes
- Written by: Jonathan Hayes
- Produced by: Jane Motz Hayes; Darren Portelli
- Starring: Mark Rendall; Nicholas Campbell; Sheila McCarthy; Michael Levinson; Victoria Sanchez
- Cinematography: Catherine Lutes
- Edited by: Duff Smith
- Music by: Ohad Benchetrit & Justin Small
- Production companies: Berkeley Films; Spiral Entertainment
- Distributed by: A71 Entertainment
- Release date: 24 August 2013 (Montreal World Film Festival)
- Running time: 101 minutes
- Country: Canada
- Language: English

Algonquin is a 2013 Canadian drama film written and directed by Jonathan Hayes. It stars Mark Rendall, Nicholas Campbell, Sheila McCarthy, Michael Levinson, and Victoria Sanchez.

== Plot ==
Leif (Nicholas Campbell), a travel writer whose career has declined, visits his son Jake (Mark Rendall). The father plans to produce a book about Algonquin Park and invites his son to join him in its writing. Leif also meets up with Rita (Sheila McCarthy), his former wife and Jake's mother. Matters are complicated when they are joined by Carmen (Victoria Sanchez), Leif's young romantic partner, and her son Iggy (Michael Levinson). Leif and Jake then proceed with a canoe trip through Algonquin Park to find a particular horseshoe.

== Cast ==
- Mark Rendall as Jake Roulette
- Nicholas Campbell as Leif Roulette
- Sheila McCarthy as Rita
- Michael Levinson as Iggy
- Victoria Sanchez as Carmen
- Boyd Banks as Park Warden

== Production ==
Algonquin marks the first time that Hayes has written and directed a feature film.

== Release ==
The film was first screened at the Montreal World Film Festival on 24 August 2013.

TheStar.com critic rated two point five out of five stars and wrote that "It’s hardly a hugs-all-around reunion and tempers run hot as Jake becomes increasingly exasperated with his father"
