= Closure (Agents of S.H.I.E.L.D.) =

- Agents of S.H.I.E.L.D. episode
- Episode no.: Season 3 Episode 9
- Directed by: Kate Woods
- Written by: Brent Fletcher
- Cinematography by: Feliks Parnell
- Editing by: Eric Litman; Michael Benni Pierce
- Original air date: December 1, 2015
- Running time: 43 minutes

Guest appearances
- Powers Boothe as Gideon Malick; Constance Zimmer as Rosalind Price; Juan Pablo Raba as Joey Gutierrez; Andrew Howard as Luther Banks; Mark Dacascos as Giyera; Tyler Ritter as Thomas Ward

Episode chronology
← Previous "Many Heads, One Tale"	Next → "Maveth"
- Agents of S.H.I.E.L.D. season 3

"Closure" is the ninth episode of the third season of the American television series Agents of S.H.I.E.L.D. Based on the Marvel Comics organization S.H.I.E.L.D., it follows Phil Coulson and his team of S.H.I.E.L.D. agents as they face a vengeful former agent and Hydra. It is set in the Marvel Cinematic Universe (MCU) and acknowledges the franchise's films. The episode was written by Brent Fletcher, and directed by Kate Woods.

Clark Gregg reprises his role as Coulson from the film series, and is joined by series regulars Ming-Na Wen, Brett Dalton, Chloe Bennet, Iain De Caestecker, Elizabeth Henstridge, Nick Blood, Adrianne Palicki, Henry Simmons, and Luke Mitchell.

"Closure" originally aired on ABC on December 1, 2015, and according to Nielsen Media Research, was watched by 3.84 million viewers.

== Plot ==
While Phil Coulson and Rosalind Price are having dinner at her apartment, Grant Ward fatally shoots Price through the window with a long-distance sniper rifle, and then calls Coulson to claim responsibility, revealing that Hydra is planning to reopen the portal to the barren planet, Maveth. Evading Hydra agents, Coulson returns to the Playground and interrogates Melinda May, Daisy Johnson, Leo Fitz and Jemma Simmons about their time working with Ward on the Bus, hoping to find his weaknesses and exact his revenge.

Devising a plan to draw Ward out, Coulson enlists Lance Hunter and Bobbi Morse to help him, and orders Alphonso "Mack" Mackenzie to become acting director while he is carrying out his plan. They track down and kidnap Thomas, Ward's younger brother, from the jewelry store he works at. He cooperates fully once he understands the situation. Fitz, Simmons, and an Advanced Threat Containment Unit (ATCU) team led by Luther Banks investigate the abandoned Project Distant Star facility, but they are attacked by Giyera, who kills Banks and his agents and abducts Fitz and Simmons, bringing them to the Gloucestershire castle, where Hydra is repairing the portal manipulator. Giyera tortures Simmons to get her to reveal how she escaped from Maveth, while Ward makes Fitz listen for the same purpose.

Coulson calls Ward to inform him of his brother's abduction, and Thomas keeps him on the phone long enough for Morse to track his location, taking the opportunity to deride him as even worse than their parents and Christian while commenting that their father was using a walker the night he killed Christian and their parents. After the call, Coulson has Thomas dropped off in another location. Furious, Ward takes over Simmons' torture until Fitz finally gives in, agreeing to accompany the Hydra team through the portal and help them bring back the ancient Inhuman (though he hopes to leave the creature and the Hydra agents there, and instead rescue Will Daniels).

Malick convinces Ward to lead the mission to Maveth, declaring him the finest Hydra soldier in history and the only man worthy of this task. While Mack marshals a taskforce (including Lincoln Campbell and Joey Gutierrez) to launch an assault on the castle, Coulson, Hunter, and Morse get there first in their Quinjet, just as Malick opens the portal using the Monolith pieces.

After Ward and his team go through with Fitz, Coulson dives from the Quinjet into the portal, and is knocked unconscious upon landing on Maveth.

== Production ==
=== Development ===
In November 2015, Marvel announced that the ninth episode of the season would be titled "Closure", to be written by Brent Fletcher, with Kate Woods directing.

=== Casting ===
In November 2015, Marvel revealed that main cast members Clark Gregg, Ming-Na Wen, Brett Dalton, Chloe Bennet, Iain De Caestecker, Elizabeth Henstridge, Nick Blood, Adrianne Palicki, Henry Simmons, and Luke Mitchell would star as Phil Coulson, Melinda May, Grant Ward, Daisy Johnson, Leo Fitz, Jemma Simmons, Lance Hunter, Bobbi Morse, Alphonso "Mack" Mackenzie, and Lincoln Campbell, respectively. It was also revealed that the guest cast for the episode would include Constance Zimmer as Rosalind Price, Juan Pablo Raba as Joey Gutierrez, Andrew Howard as Luther Banks, Powers Boothe as Gideon Malick, Mark Dacascos as Mr. Giyera and Tyler Ritter as Thomas Ward. Zimmer, Raba, Howard, Boothe, and Dacascos reprise their roles from earlier in the series. Ritter's character, the younger brother of Grant Ward, previously appeared as a young boy through flashbacks in "The Well", portrayed by Micah Nelson.

== Broadcast ==
"Closure" was first aired in the United States on ABC on December 1, 2015.

== Reception ==
=== Ratings ===
In the United States the episode received a 1.3/4 percent share among adults between the ages of 18 and 49, meaning that it was seen by 1.3 percent of all households, and 4 percent of all of those watching television at the time of the broadcast. It was watched by 3.84 million viewers.

=== Accolades ===
In June 2016, IGN ranked the episode as the fifth best in the series.
