= The Exploding Girl =

- Film poster
- Directed by: Bradley Rust Gray
- Written by: Bradley Rust Gray
- Produced by: Karin Chien; Ben Howe; So Yong Kim; Jay Van Hoy
- Starring: Zoe Kazan; Mark Rendall
- Cinematography: Eric Lin
- Edited by: Bradley Rust Gray
- Distributed by: Oscilloscope Pictures
- Release dates: February 6, 2009 (Berlin Film Festival); March 12, 2010 (United States)
- Running time: 79 minutes
- Country: United States
- Language: English

The Exploding Girl is a 2009 American independent film written and directed by Bradley Rust Gray, starring Zoe Kazan and Mark Rendall. It premiered at the Berlin International Film Festival in 2009 and was released theatrically in the United States on March 12, 2010.

== Plot ==
Ivy is a college student suffering from juvenile myoclonic epilepsy, who has returned home to Brooklyn for spring break. While she stays at her mother's house, her childhood friend Al, also home from college, asks to crash on their couch as his parents have rented out his room. Over the course of the break, Ivy and Al spend most of their time together, strengthening their already deep bond, especially after Ivy's distant college boyfriend breaks up with her via telephone.

== Cast ==
- Zoe Kazan as Ivy
- Mark Rendall as Al
- Maryann Urbano as Mom
- Franklin Pipp as Greg's voice

== Production ==
The Exploding Girl was shot in the guerrilla filmmaking tradition on-location in New York City.

== Reception ==
=== Critical response ===
On the review aggregator website Rotten Tomatoes, 76% of 38 critics' reviews are positive, with an average rating of 7.0/10. Metacritic, which uses a weighted average, assigned the film a score of 69 out of 100, based on 15 critics, indicating "generally favorable" reviews.

=== Accolades ===
Zoe Kazan won Best Actress at the Tribeca Film Festival.
