= Tales from the Neverending Story =

- Tales from the Neverending Story Vol. 1 DVD cover
- Starring: Mark Rendall; Tyler Hynes
- Country of origin: Canada
- Original language: English
- No. of seasons: 1
- No. of episodes: 4 (television film's version) / 13

Original release
- Network: HBO; Hallmark Channel
- Release: October 1, 2001 – January 1, 2002

Tales from the Neverending Story is a single-season TV series that is loosely based on Michael Ende's 1979 novel The Neverending Story, produced (in Montreal, Quebec, Canada between December 2000 and August 2002) and distributed by Muse Entertainment, and aired on HBO in 2002. It was aired as 4 two-hour television movies in the US and as a TV series of 13 one-hour episodes in the UK. The first two television movies were released on DVD and VHS in 2002, followed by a complete series box set in 2004.

Departing from the canon of the 1979 novel The Neverending Story by Michael Ende, the overall story in the series explored the origin story of how Bastian discovers Fantasia from an even greater point of divergence from Michael Ende's novel than the 1984, 1990, and 1994 Warner Bros. films had previously depicted.

Events from the novel occur out of order, and specific plot points are reversed between characters. For example, in the novel and films, it is Bastian who enters the world of Fantasia, but here it is Atreyu who enters the real world. The concept of Yin and yang is introduced by altering the nature of the Childlike Empress's relationship with Xayide. In the series they are sisters with opposing ideologies. The Old Man of Wandering Mountain also takes on a larger role in the series becoming a mentor of sorts to Atreyu in much the same way as Karl Konrad Koreander is for Bastian.

The series also introduces new supporting characters. Lucas and Marley are Bastian's friends who try to defend him from school bullies, and Fly Girl is a heroine whom Atreyu meets who is on her own Quest. Tales from The Neverending Story is the first live action adaption not to feature the Rockbiter.

== Episodes ==
=== US version ===
1. The Beginning - Part 1
2. The Gift - Part 2
3. Badge of Courage - Part 3
4. Resurrection - Part 4

=== UK version ===
1. Heart of Stone - Episode 1 (Pilot)
2. The Nothing - Episode 2
3. The Luckdragon - Episode 3
4. Deleting Mr. Blank - Episode 4
5. The Gift of the Name - Episode 5
6. Home Sweet Home - Episode 6
7. The Sceptre - Episode 7
8. The Luck Stops Here - Episode 8
9. Badge of Courage - Episode 9
10. Deus Ex Machina - Episode 10
11. Stairway to Heaven - Episode 11
12. The Visitor - Episode 12
13. Resurrection - Episode 13 (Finale)

== Cast ==
- Mark Rendall as Bastian Balthazar Bux
- Greg Kramer as Rip Rowdy
- Noël Burton as Michael Bux
- Emma Campbell as April
- John Dunn-Hill as Koreander
- Sally Taylor-Isherwood as Yonie
- Audrey Gardiner as the Childlike Empress
- Tyler Hynes as Atreyu
- Victoria Sanchez as Xayide
- Johnny Griffin as Connor
- Jane Wheeler as Laura Bux
- Robert Crooks as Tartus
- Stéfanie Buxton as Fly Girl
- Emma Taylor-Isherwood as Olano
- Edward Yankie as Mr. Blank and Gmork
- Stefano Faustini as Lucas
- Brittany Drisdelle as Fallon
- Valérie Chiniara as Marley
