= Eternal (film) =

- Directed by: Wilhelm Liebenberg; Federico Sanchez
- Written by: Wilhelm Liebenberg; Federico Sanchez
- Produced by: Wilhelm Liebenberg; Tommaso Calevi
- Starring: Sarah Manninen; Caroline Néron; Victoria Sanchez; Conrad Pla
- Cinematography: Jamie Thompson
- Edited by: Isabelle Lévesque
- Music by: Mysterious Art
- Production companies: TVA Films; WildKoast Entertainment
- Distributed by: Sony Pictures Home Entertainment
- Release date: September 24, 2004
- Running time: 108 minutes
- Country: Canada
- Language: English

Eternal is a 2004 film about sixteenth-century Countess Elizabeth Báthory "repeating her crimes in modern day Montreal".

== Characters ==
Mark R. Leeper writes that "Néron's exotic lesbian vampire" in Eternal (2004) "is reminiscent of Dracula's Daughter, though her assistant and victim-procurer Irina (Victoria Sanchez) is much less powerful than Sandor was in the earlier film".

== Production run ==
The film premiered in Canada in September 2004.

== Reception ==
Mark R. Leeper gives the film a 6/10, concluding that the film is "polished, sexy, and entertaining, and the art direction is its best aspect. But it is not a film that will stick with the viewer. It is too similar to films like Jack's Back (about Jack the Ripper returning) and several others".

== See also ==
- Stay Alive, another film inspired by the "Blood Countess".
