= Naturally, Sadie =

- The cast: Rain, Margaret, Sadie, Jean, Walter, and Hal (from left to right)
- Genre: Comedy drama
- Created by: Barbara Wiechmann
- Developed by: Suzanne Bolch; John May
- Starring: Charlotte Arnold; Michael D'Ascenzo; Jasmine Richards; Justin Bradley
- Opening theme: "Naturally, Sadie" performed by Angie Grant
- Country of origin: Canada
- Original language: English
- No. of seasons: 3
- No. of episodes: 65 (list of episodes)

Production
- Executive producers: Steven DeNure; Neil Court; Beth Stevenson; John May; Suzanne Bolch; Brent Piaskoski
- Producer: Kevin May
- Running time: 22 minutes
- Production company: Decode Entertainment (Note: As Decode/Sadie Productions Inc. (Season 1), Decode/Sadie Productions 2 Inc. (Season 2), or Decode/Sadie Productions 3 Inc. (Season 3))

Original release
- Network: Family Channel
- Release: June 24, 2005 – August 26, 2007

Naturally, Sadie is a Canadian teen comedy drama that ran for three seasons from June 24, 2005, to August 26, 2007, on Family Channel. The series was produced by Decode Entertainment. It was created by Barbara Wiechmann, and developed by Suzanne Bolch and John May.

== Plot ==
The plot centers on 14-year-old Sadie Hawthorne, who lives with her parents and brother Hal in Whitby, Ontario. She's a high school student and aspiring naturalist who loves to study and observe animal behavior. Luckily for her she has two best friends, Margaret and Rain, to back her up until she figures it all out. The series was originally titled and broadcast as Going Green and "The Complete Freaks of Nature" , the name being changed to Naturally, Sadie when Shawn Hlookoff thought of the new idea.

Season 2 deals with Sadie as a sophomore in high school and sees her acting, feeling, and looking more like a typical teenager. From season 1 to season 2 the show's format changed greatly. There is more continuity between episodes and less focus on nature. Sadie no longer has a crush on Owen Anthony but now likes the new kid, Ben Harrison.

Season 3 deals with Sadie and Ben's relationship after they break up in the first episode. Margaret is still really into fashion and gives even more advice. Rain's old friend Taylor comes back into his life and they get closer and become a couple.

== Episodes ==
Season	Episodes	Originally released	
Season	Episodes	First released	Last released
1	26	June 24, 2005	September 18, 2005
2	26	April 2, 2006	January 14, 2007
3	13	June 3, 2007	August 26, 2007

== Cast and characters ==
=== Main ===
- Charlotte Arnold as Sadie Hawthorne, an aspiring naturalist and student at R.B. Bennett High School, named after the 11th Prime Minister of Canada. Sadie treats every day like one big experiment. Her stubborn pursuit of knowledge occasionally lands her in a bit of trouble but she manages to scrape through somehow with help from her best friends Rain and Margaret. She loves playing games with Rain, Margaret, Owen, Ben, and Adren. A vegetarian, Sadie sees every animal as cute even the ones that others find creepy or strange, and she has a pet tarantula named Charlotte. Her role model is Jane Goodall, who she wishes to be like and, in many episodes, tries to get in contact with.
- Michael D'Ascenzo as Rainbow “Rain” Papadakis, Sadie's male best friend, a Greek Canadian who is a constant source of comedy. He is always working on one of his master plans-for-success, which usually end in failure. He has a gruelling part-time job at his family's restaurant, and parents who lecture at length in Greek about the virtues of being "more like his cousins". Luckily, he has best friends Sadie and Margaret to support and accept him for his eccentricities.
- Jasmine Richards as Margaret Browning-Levesque, Sadie's female best friend who sometimes wants Sadie to behave more like their peers. However she, being more popular and wanting conventional friends, supports Sadie's naturalist interests and Rain's schemes. Much of her interests are of a typical teenage girl: shopping, fashion, dancing and boys.
- Justin Bradley as Hal Hawthorne, Sadie's annoying, although sometimes helpful, older brother, who, unlike Sadie, does not do very well in school. While often in trouble, Hal has shown skill in art. He also leads a band called "Morning Breath".

=== Recurring ===
- Collette Micks as Jean Hawthorne, Hal and Sadie's mother is a writer. When she is not on tour in some other city, she's locked in her office, working or lying on the couch with her eyes closed, thinking about work. Jean has always encouraged Sadie's fascination with animals and is the one who will stick up for her when she chooses digging up beetles over her family movie night. Jean understands focus, determination and fanciful exploration and is happy to see her daughter so full of them all. Jean's a little flighty and sometimes has her head way up in the clouds but Sadie appreciates her mother's artiness and the heartfelt - albeit abbreviated - talks that they have together.
- Richard Clarkin as Walter Hawthorne, Hal and Sadie's dad is an engineer. He's a straight-shooting, exacting doer who can build things with tools and bake complicated cakes that require precise measurements, but who can't throw a meal together without a recipe. Walter is precise in everything he does and is, in many ways, the polar opposite of messy, think-outside-the-box Jean. Sadie ponders this "opposites attracting" thing a lot, wondering at nature's grand design, not because her parents' relationship doesn't work, but rather because somehow, miraculously, it does. He enjoys playing 'Merlins and Magicians.'
- Kyle Kass as Owen Anthony, Sadie's crush from season 1. In season 2 when Sadie develops a crush on Ben she starts to see Owen as a friend only. She hurts his feelings when she agrees to take both Ben and Owen to the school dance and he finds out and ends their relationship.
- Mandy Butcher as Chelsea Breuer, the popular, mean girl from Season 1 and friends with Margaret. After Season 1 Chelsea isn't seen or mentioned again.
- Katie Hood as Ron Yuma, a nerd who everyone finds irritating. He acts like a know-it-all and always tries to be in charge.
- Mallory Margel as Mallory Randall, the female counterpart of Ron but unlike Ron she tries to be everyone's friend and that's what annoys people. However most people find her more tolerable than Ron. She has a crush on Hal Hawthorne. Mallory and Ron end up as a couple.
- Caroline Park as Vivian Wu, Rain's crush but she doesn't know that he likes her.
- Alison Sealy-Smith as Ms. Mann, the strict school principal. She likes to act young by using lingo such as 'boo yeah'. She is usually seen walking around the school halls to find students to give task completion slips to.
- Jacob Kraemer as Ben Harrison, Sadie's crush from season 2 onwards. He's the new kid whom everyone likes. He enjoys photography. His favourite colour is grey, and his favourite food is barbecue sauce. He always says Chimo, with a little twist with his hand, to greet and say goodbye to people. Sadie finds him sweet, charming, smug, and cute. He calls her "Red" because of her hair colour, and makes her take risks. Ben and Sadie almost kiss on many occasions, but something always happens to get in the way. Eventually the two kiss in the episode "Sliding Closet Doors".
- Shenae Grimes as Arden Alcott, appears starting in season 2, as the popular, mean girl, and is famous for her manipulations. She is Sadie's romantic rival for Ben Harrison. She had a short, secret relationship with Rain before breaking it off because he wasn't popular. She likes to call people by their last names.
- Diana Peressini as Taylor DiDomenicantonio, Rain's girlfriend in season 3. She was an old friend when they were younger and he began dating her when she moved to Whitby, and they hit it off like old times at camp.

== Production ==
The series was produced by Decode Entertainment (which was later purchased by DHX Media Ltd.). Although set in Whitby, Ontario, it was filmed in Toronto, Ontario, with school and home scenes shot inside a former Catholic elementary school in Little Italy, and mall scenes in the Dufferin Mall.

== Broadcast ==
Naturally, Sadie was broadcast in Canada on Family Channel and VRAK-TV. Outside of Canada, the series aired in 90 markets, and was broadcast on Disney Channel in the United States, ABC in Australia, e-Junior in the United Arab Emirates and France 2. It also aired on a number of international Nickelodeon channels, including Australia, Italy, Israel, Scandinavia, Spain, Asia, and Germany.

== Home media ==
A best-of compilation DVD of Naturally Sadie was released on May 11, 2010, in the United States and Canada by Video Services Corp. The DVD contains 13 episodes over 2 discs from seasons 1 and 2.

In Australia, 2 volumes of season 1 have been released by distributor Roadshow. The first volume titled 'Forest For the Trees' contains episodes 1 to 6 and was released on June 1, 2011. The second volume titled 'Best of Enemies' contains episodes 7-12 and was released on December 2, 2011. The episodes are in their original widescreen aspect ratio. There are no plans to release the rest of the episodes at the moment.

== Awards and nominations ==
Year	Award	Category	Recipient	Result	Ref.
2006	Chicago International Film Festival	Special Achievement: Direction	David Winning (for ep. "Year of the Dragon")	Won	
2006	Directors Guild of Canada	Outstanding Television Series: Family	Naturally, Sadie (for ep. "Double Jeopardy")	Nominated	
2006	Leo Awards	Best Direction in a Youth or Children's Program or Series	Naturally, Sadie (for ep. "Double Jeopardy")	Nominated	
2006	Shaw Rocket Prize	Excellence in Children's and Youth TV Programming	Naturally, Sadie	Nominated	
2007	Writers Guild of Canada	Youth	Brent Piaskoski (for ep. "Rashomon")	Won	
2007	Young Artist Awards	Best Performance in a TV Series (Comedy or Drama) – Recurring Young Actor	Jacob Kraemer	Nominated	
2008	Writers Guild of Canada	Youth	Brent Piaskoski (for ep. "In or Out of Africa")	Won	
