= Three Inches =

- Genre: Science fiction; Action; Drama
- Created by: Harley Peyton
- Starring: Noah Reid; James Marsters; Kyle Schmid; Stephanie Jacobsen; Naoko Mori; Julian Richings; Craig Eldridge; Antony Del Rio
- Country of origin: United States
- Original language: English

Production
- Executive producers: Harley Peyton; Jace Alexander; J. J. Jamieson
- Running time: 90 minutes

Original release
- Network: Syfy
- Release: December 29, 2011

Three Inches is an American science fiction action television special, intended to serve as the pilot episode for a proposed series. Created by writer-producer Harley Peyton and directed by Jace Alexander, Three Inches aired on Syfy on December 29, 2011. The television special follows a group of people with superhuman abilities, focusing on Walter Spackman, played by Noah Reid, an underachiever who develops a telekinetic ability after being struck by lightning.

The television special received favorable reviews, but failed to be picked up as a TV series.

== Plot ==
On the same day that 26-year-old Walter Spackman confesses his love to the non-reciprocating Lily, he is struck by lightning. He awakens from a coma to discover that he has gained the ability to move objects with his mind up to a distance of three inches. The mysterious Troy Hamilton recruits Walter to join his team of superheroes and Walter joins in the hope of helping to improve the world.

Walter's first mission is to recover a package on behalf of an unknown client. The "package" turns out to be a young girl named Cassie, who has a set of superhuman abilities. Deeply troubled, Walter quits the team but returns to headquarters with teammate Watts, best friend Macklin and Cassie's sister to rescue the girl. The next day Troy tells Walter that he had no idea that the "package" was a person. Upon learning the truth, he counted on Walter's sense of decency to lead him to quit and, as a "disgruntled former employee", rescue Cassie while giving Troy the "plausible deniability" he needed. Walter rejoins the team.

== Cast ==
=== Main characters ===
- Noah Reid as Walter Spackman, an underachiever who develops a telekinetic ability after being struck by lightning. He can move objects up to a maximum distance of three inches.
- James Marsters as Troy Hamilton, an ex-Army intelligence officer who investigated psychics, got interested in people with gifts, leading him to form his own team. He is the group's organizer and has no extraordinary powers of his own.
- Kyle Schmid as Brandon, the field leader who is Troy’s son. He wears body armor and displays tactical finesse. He has no extraordinary powers of his own.
- Stephanie Jacobsen as Watts; she can alter people's emotional states when she is near them, making them feel happy or sad.
- Naoko Mori as Annika; she can mimic sounds she hears, so she does perfect imitations of people.
- Antony Del Rio as Carlos "The Human Smell", the youngest member of the team who can emit a pungent gas through his pores. He often talks about himself in the third person.
- Craig Eldridge as Todd; he has limited clairvoyancy, and gets stronger headaches the further into the future he looks. He has the power to see up to two minutes into the future.
- Julian Richings as Ethan, an entomologist who can communicate with and control insects.

=== Supporting characters ===
- Andrea Martin as Belinda Spackman, Walter's quirky mother.
- Brandon Jay McLaren as Macklin Sportello, Walter's friend. He works as a sous-chef at a bistro where several scenes take place.
- Alona Tal as Lily Theroux, Walter's crush.

== Development ==
Syfy initially planned to develop Three Inches as an hour-long drama. Syfy announced the project in March 2010, and the network ordered the pilot in October. The pilot was delivered to the network at around the same time as the pilot for Alphas, another series with a similar premise. Syfy executives liked both pilots but felt that Alphas had better potential as an hour-long series. The network began exploring ways to reformat Three Inches, including possibly making it into a half-hour sitcom.

== Critical reception ==
Brian Ford Sullivan of The Futon Critic gave the pilot a generally positive review. He found that the show has "an inherent cleverness" and was fun to watch. He particularly praised the performances of Reid and Marsters. However, he found the show's mixing of tones, from Walter's "slightly wacky home life" to the gloominess of his daily existence to the camaraderie with his fellow heroes to the dark possible consequences of their mission, to be uneven.
