= The Scream Team =

- Genre: Comedy; Family; Fantasy; Horror
- Screenplay by: Daniel Berendsen
- Story by: Robert Short; Dan Berendsen
- Directed by: Stuart Gillard
- Starring: Mark Rendall; Kat Dennings; Robert Bockstael; Eric Idle; Tommy Davidson; Kathy Najimy
- Composer: David Kitay
- Country of origin: United States
- Original language: English

Production
- Executive producer: Paula Hart
- Producer: Kevin May
- Cinematography: Philip Linzey
- Editors: Donn Aron; Robin Russell
- Running time: 88 minutes
- Production company: Hartbreak Films

Original release
- Network: Disney Channel
- Release: October 4, 2002

The Scream Team is a 2002 American comedy horror television film directed by Stuart Gillard from a story by Robert Short and Dan Berendsen, who also wrote the screenplay. The film stars Mark Rendall, Kat Dennings, Robert Bockstael, Eric Idle, Tommy Davidson, and Kathy Najimy and premiered on October 4, 2002, on Disney Channel as part of the network's series of original movies.

== Plot ==
Two children, Ian and Claire, move into a town where their grandfather has just died. Ian thinks his grandfather's spirit is trying to tell them something, finding some library news clippings about a man named Zachariah Kull, who was accused of burning his home with his wife in it. Later, Ian and Claire capture a ghost named Jumper (a dead skydiver) who ends up freed by his partner, Coffin Ed (a Revolutionary soldier). They follow them and other ghostly wisps of air into the forest, where they find an abandoned building. Entering, they find arriving ghosts entering a mirror, which leads to the afterlife. Ed and Jumper's boss, Mariah (a dead bride) isn't too pleased with this. Ian and Claire learn that they look for souls that don't want to cross over, and are dubbed the "Soul Patrol" by Jumper; they ended up with these jobs while waiting for their turn to cross over.

In exchange for letting their grandfather complete anything he wants finished before moving on, the children discover that Zachariah has kidnapped him to increase his powers. The children join forces with the Soul Patrol, to destroy Zachariah and release all the captured souls. They confront Zachariah at an abandoned mine, where Mariah is able to parry his fireballs, but finds he's gained new powers; Jumper ends up captured, further increasing Zachariah's strength. In the end they discover Zachariah was really a misunderstood inventor experimenting with natural gas, and one of his inventions accidentally burned his wife to death. When he was killed, Zachariah told his wife to wait for him, knowing he wouldn't be able to cross over due to desiring revenge against his injustice. At the festival that honors the villain everyone thinks him to be, Zachariah emerges from a burning effigy. However, Claire and Ian reveal the truth, reminding Zachariah that his wife is still waiting for him to cross over. Zachariah releases all of the trapped spirits and finally moves on.

The children and their father return home to find the grandfather's spirit waiting for them; the Soul Patrol kept their promise to let him take care of his unfinished business. He reveals how proud he is of his son, something he never did in life; when asked if he has to leave right away, the grandfather explains "eternity can wait awhile" and spends time catching up with his son before moving on. The family decides to stay in town, which is changing from bashing the formerly evil ghost to telling the truth about him.

During the day, Ian and Claire visit the Soul Patrol, finding only Jumper and Ed, who explain that Mariah is talking to their bosses in the next world. Mariah returns, explaining that the little spectacle they caused to put an end to Zachariah's terror exposed the fact there is an afterlife; she is left anguished by this as she was almost done working for them, and the punishment is the extension of Mariah, Jumper and Coffin Ed's jobs. Ed visits them while they carve pumpkins with an invention of their grandfather's, avoiding getting hit by debris thanks to being a ghost – "There are some advantages to being dead."

== Cast ==
- Mark Rendall as Ian Carlyle
- Kat Dennings as Claire Carlyle
- Tommy Davidson as Jumper
- Kim Coates as Zachariah Kull
- Robert Bockstael as Richard Carlyle
- Eric Idle as Coffin Ed
- Kathy Najimy as Mariah
- Gary Reineke as Grandpa Frank Carlyle
- Nigel Bennett as Warner
- Edie Inksetter as Face
- Zoie Palmer as Rebecca Kull
- Derek Sypniewski as Wizard
- Anna Tauteiter as Fairy
- Joseph Motiki as Customs Ghost

== See also ==
- List of films set around Halloween
