= The Sinful Village =

The Sinful Village (German: Das sündige Dorf) may refer to:

- The Sinful Village (play), a play by the German writer Max Neal
- The Sinful Village (1940 film), a German film adaptation
- The Sinful Village (1954 film), a German film adaptation
- The Sinful Village (1966 film), a German film adaptation
- The Sinful Village (TV series), a German television adaptation
