= The Merry Wives of Tyrol =

1964 film

- Directed by: Hans Billian
- Written by: Hans Billian
- Produced by: Karl Heinz Busse
- Starring: Hannelore Auer; Gus Backus; Rudolf Prack
- Cinematography: Dieter Wedekind
- Edited by: Elisabeth Kleinert-Neumann
- Music by: Gerhard Narholz
- Production company: Music House
- Distributed by: Ceres-Filmverleih
- Release date: 18 September 1964
- Running time: 98 minutes
- Country: West Germany
- Language: German

The Merry Wives of Tyrol (German: Die lustigen Weiber von Tirol) is a 1964 West German musical comedy film directed by Hans Billian and starring Hannelore Auer, Gus Backus and Rudolf Prack.

The film's sets were designed by the art director Sepp Rothauer.

== Cast ==
- Hannelore Auer as Hannelore Lechner
- Gus Backus as Charly Rassell
- Rudolf Prack as Musikverleger Karl-Heinz Busch
- Heli Finkenzeller as Veronika Lechner
- Beppo Brem as Hausdiener Sepp
- Acker Bilk as himself
- Gisèle Boyer as Stasy
- Vera Complojer as Hermine Lechner - Frau Hofrat
- Marie-France Dousset as Ursi
- Eva Eden as Gisi
- Edburga Euller
- Herta Fahrenkrog as Marlene Angermann - Charlys Braut
- Brigitte Gola as Hotelgast
- Gustl Gstettenbaur as Hotelchef Simmering
- Gisela Hahn as Reni
- Irma Hartlieb as Sissy
- Renate Küster as Marianne Lechner
- Hugo Lindinger as Bürgermeister Schwammerl von Seebrügg
- Peggy March as herself
- Billy Mo as himself
- Hilde Neukam as Hotelgast
- Regina Petran as Susi
- Richard Rüdiger as Dr. Schermann, Tierarzt
- Margitta Scherr as Gertraud Lechner
- Manfred Schnelldorfer as himself
- Helmut Schopf as Sportlicher Badegast
- Lily Sedina as Hotelgast
- Mal Sondock as Theodor Reiss - Manager einer Girl-Truppe
- Peter W. Staub as Schwimmleher Emil Nass
- André Verchuren as himself

== Bibliography ==
- Hans-Michael Bock and Tim Bergfelder. The Concise Cinegraph: An Encyclopedia of German Cinema. Berghahn Books.
