= Hans Billian =

German film director (1918–2007)

- Born: 15 April 1918; Breslau, Province of Silesia
- Died: 18 December 2007 (aged 89); Gräfelfing, Bavaria, Germany
- Occupation(s): Film producer, Film director, writer

Hans Billian (born Hans Joachim Hubert Backe, 15 April 1918 in Breslau (today, Wrocław, Poland) – 18 December 2007 in Gräfelfing, Bavaria) was a German film director, screenwriter, and actor noted for the "sex comedies" he directed in the 1970s. He was also credited as Hans Billan, Phillip Halliday, and Christian Kessler.

== Early career ==
Billian originally wanted to become an opera singer but due to the deterioration of his voice during his nine years in military service he had to abandon this plan. After World War II, he settled in West Germany and started to work as an actor at theatres in Hamburg and Wolfenbüttel. He later began to work also as a director's assistant.

In 1950, he started to work for various German film producers. Especially, his work for Constantin-Film proved to be successful until 1961 when he left this company to work as a freelance screenwriter and director. Until the late 1960s, he wrote films or directed films that fell under the category Heimatfilm, such as Ich kauf' mir lieber einen Tirolerhut in 1965. In the late 1960s and early 1970s, he directed softcore sex comedies, like Pudelnackt in Oberbayern (1969) (a Bavarian sex comedy pioneer), Die Jungfrauen von Bumshausen (Run, Virgin, Run) (1970), and Das Mädchen mit der heißen Masche (Loves of a French Pussycat) (1972) (starring Sybil Danning).

== Pornographic films ==
In 1973, Billian directed hardcore short-length loops for the Swedish company Venus Film. When the ban on hardcore pornography was lifted in Germany, he started to direct numerous short-length hardcore films there. In 1975, he directed the first German full-length hardcore feature film, Bienenstich im Liebesnest (soft version known as Im Gasthaus zum scharfen Hirschen, also known as Zimmermädchen machen es gern). In 1976, he directed Josefine Mutzenbacher...wie sie wirklich war? 1. Teil (Sensational Janine) about the early life of Viennese courtesan Josephine Mutzenbacher. The film that had the title role played by Patricia Rhomberg who also had an intimate relationship with Billian was his greatest success. During this period, Billian continued to shoot loops, a number of which attracted particular attention such as Massagesalon Elvira that featured Anne Magle, the Danish porn sensation of the '70s.

Josefine Mutzenbacher...wie sie wirklich war? 1. Teil was conceived by Billian as the first part of a Josefine Mutzenbacher series but when the producer Gunter Otto of Herzog refused to finance a second part, Billian took the money from the production company Starlight and directed Die Beichte der Josefine Mutzenbacher (Josephine) in 1979. However, Otto who held the rights for the title released Josefine Mutzenbacher...wie sie wirklich war? 2. Teil (Professional Janine) in 1980. Both films were unable to reach the success of the 1976 film, particularly due to absence of Rhomberg and lack of continuity with the first film. In 1981 (Aus dem Tagebuch der Josefine Mutzenbacher ), 1987 (Die Liebesschule der Josefine Mutzenbacher ) & 1991 Billian directed three further Josefine Mutzenbacher titles. Gunter Otto made consecutive Josefine movies (Josefine Mutzenbacher – Wie sie wirklich war: 3,4,5,6. Teil) from 1982 to 1984.

In the 1990s, he directed porn videos, especially for the producer Tabu of Bochum, but these videos fell far from the quality of his work in the 1970s.

== Selected filmography ==
- Nora's Ark (1948)
- The Merry Wives of Tyrol (1964)
- Holiday in St. Tropez (1964)
- Come to the Blue Adriatic (1966)
