= Teddy Parker =

German singer (1938–2021)

- Born: Claus Herwig; 17 April 1938; Brno, First Czechoslovak Republic
- Died: 17 June 2021 (aged 83); Munich, Germany
- Occupation: Singer

Claus Herwig (17 April 1938 – 17 June 2021), known professionally as Teddy Parker, was a German singer.

== Biography ==
Herwig was born in Brno but moved to Bamberg following World War II and the expulsion of Germans from Czechoslovakia. In 1955, he moved to Munich and took choral classes. After he earned his Abitur, he studied law. In 1957, he took part in a competition for young talent and earned a contract with the record label Tempo. His style took after that of Frank Sinatra, Peter Alexander, Peter Kraus, and others.

After his state examinations, he signed a second recording contract. In 1960, he released his first single, which was under his real name, Claus Herwig. That same year, he acted in his first feature film, Hit Parade 1960. He sang with Leonie Brückner at the 1961 Deutsche Schlager-Festspiele in Wiesbaden with the titles Musikanten der Liebe and Abends in Madrid. He then recorded songs with various record companies until Muli Mexicano with Telefunken, the first title released under the name Teddy Parker. His next song, Nachtexpress nach St. Tropez, topped charts for three weeks.

Following his success in the 1960s, Parker's career lulled. In the early 1970s, he was Editor-in-Chief of Bayerischer Rundfunk and a disk jockey at Club 16 um 17. He took part in the German selection show for the Eurovision Song Contest 1972, in which he came in eleventh of twelve entries. In the 1980s, he enjoyed success in the Volkstümliche Musik genre.

Teddy Parker died in Munich on 17 June 2021 at the age of 83.

== Discography ==
=== Albums ===
- Volkstümliches Wunschkonzert mit Teddy Parker (1985)
- Nachtexpress nach St.Tropez (1996)
- Die Stimme des Herzens (1996)
- Heimat deine Sterne (1998)
- Ein Lied für dich (2004)

=== Singles ===
- Nachtexpress nach St. Tropez (1963)
- Hätt ich ein weißes Sportcoupé (1963)
- Baby ich hol dich von der Schule ab (1963)
- In Copacabana (1963)
- Sieben Tage ohne Susi (1964)
- Wie eine Ladung Dynamit (1971)
- Du, ich habe mein Herz verloren (1971)
- Ihr Name war Carmen (1973)
- So weit von daheim (1990)
- Jeder Tag ist ein Geschenk (1990)
- Für ein kleines Gebet (1990)
- Eine Tür steht immer offen (1992)
- Ein Mutterherz soll niemals weinen (1994)
- Zuerst kommst Du (1996)

== Filmography ==
- Hit Parade 1960 (1960)
- I Will Always Be Yours (1960)
- Davon träumen alle Mädchen (1961)
- When the Music Plays at Wörthersee (1962)
- Arrogance in the Salzkammergut (1963)
- ...denn die Musik und die Liebe in Tirol (1963)
- Die drei Scheinheiligen (1964)
- Holiday in St. Tropez (1964)
- Ich kauf mir lieber einen Tirolerhut (1965)
- Zum Stanglwirt (1995)
