= Elisabeth Kleinert-Neumann =

German film editor

- Occupation: Film editor
- Years active: 1933–1967

Elisabeth Kleinert-Neumann was a German film editor active from the 1930s through the 1960s.

== Selected filmography ==
- Operazione San Pietro (1967)
- The Spy with Ten Faces (1966)
- Hotel der toten Gäste (1965)
- Die lustigen Weiber von Tirol (1964)
- Holiday in St. Tropez (1964)
- ...denn die Musik und die Liebe in Tirol (1963)
- Eleven Years and One Day (1963)
- Street of Temptation (1962)
- Auf Wiedersehen (1961)
- Brandenburg Division (1960)
- Nick Knatterton’s Adventure (1959)
- The Blue Sea and You (1959)
- Tausend Sterne leuchten (1959)
- El Hakim (1957)
- The Beggar Student (1956)
- Roses in Autumn (1955)
- Regina Amstetten (1954)
- Moselfahrt aus Liebeskummer (1953)
- Liebeskrieg nach Noten (1953)
- Rape on the Moor (1952)
- Bis wir uns wiedersehn (1952)
- Tausend rote Rosen blüh'n (1952)
- Danke, es geht mir gut (1948)
- Die schwarze Robe (1944)
- Der Fall Rainer (1942)
- The Night in Venice (1942)
- Jakko (1941)
- Detours to Happiness (1939)
- The Voice of the Heart (1937)
