= Peter W. Staub =

- Born: 31 August 1910; Arbon, Switzerland
- Died: 25 December 2000 (age 90); St. Gallen, Switzerland
- Other name: Peter Wilhelm Staub
- Occupation: Actor
- Years active: 1940–1990 (film & TV)

Peter W. Staub (1910–2000) was a Swiss singer, stage, film and television actor.

== Partial filmography ==
- Mein Traum (1940) - Jimmy
- Gilberte de Courgenay (1941) - Korporal
- Emil, mer mues halt rede mitenand (1941) - Vertreter Bigler
- Bieder der Flieger (1941) - Saniez
- Knall and Fall as Imposters (1952) - Studienrat Hegetschweiler
- Carnival in White (1952) - Fietje Schwedler
- Mask in Blue (1953) - Wat Nu, chinesischer Diener
- The Divorcée (1953) - Scrop
- The Big Star Parade (1954) - Paul Grüter
- Schützenliesel (1954) - Norbert Feldmaier
- Ball at the Savoy (1955) - Viktor
- Three Men in the Snow (1955) - Herr Franke
- Father's Day (1955)
- Request Concert (1955)
- Du mein stilles Tal (1955) - Mikeletti
- Der Frontgockel (1955) - Karl Baumgärtl, Flieger
- Parole Heimat (1955) - Erich
- Yes, Yes, Love in Tyrol (1955) - Harry Frankenstein
- Ein tolles Hotel (1956) - Fred Roller
- Die Rosel vom Schwarzwald (1956) - Klaus-Peter Gemperle
- The Beautiful Master (1956) - Franzl
- The Simple Girl (1957) - Pit
- Der Kaiser und das Wäschermädel (1957) - Herr v. Schwan, Oberlehrer
- Gangsterjagd in Lederhosen (1959) - Gabel - Zeichner
- Grounds for Divorce (1960)
- Wenn d'Fraue wähle (1960) - Julius Zubi
- Musik ist Trumpf (1961) - Mr. Miller
- Adieu, Lebewohl, Goodbye (1961)
- What Is Father Doing in Italy? (1961) - Zöllner Dubi
- Der 42. Himmel (1962) - Herr Beifleiß
- Snow White and the Seven Jugglers (1962) - Burghalter, Friseur
- Holiday in St. Tropez (1964) - Philipp Kussmaul
- The Merry Wives of Tyrol (1964) - Schwimmleher Emil Nass
- Happy-End am Wörthersee (1964) - Dr. Künzli
- Heintje: A Heart Goes on a Journey (1969) - Wache
- Der Fall (1972) - Betrunkener Zuschauer beim 6-Tage-Rennen
- Old Barge, Young Love (1973) - Polizist
- The Maddest Car in the World (1975) - Hotelbesitzer Häckli
- Klassezämekunft (1988) - Heiner 'Hahei' Amstutz (final film role)

== Bibliography ==
- Kurt Gänzl. The encyclopedia of the musical theatre, Volume 2. Schirmer Books, 2001.
