= Josephine Mutzenbacher =

1906 erotic Austrian novel

Josefine Mutzenbacher
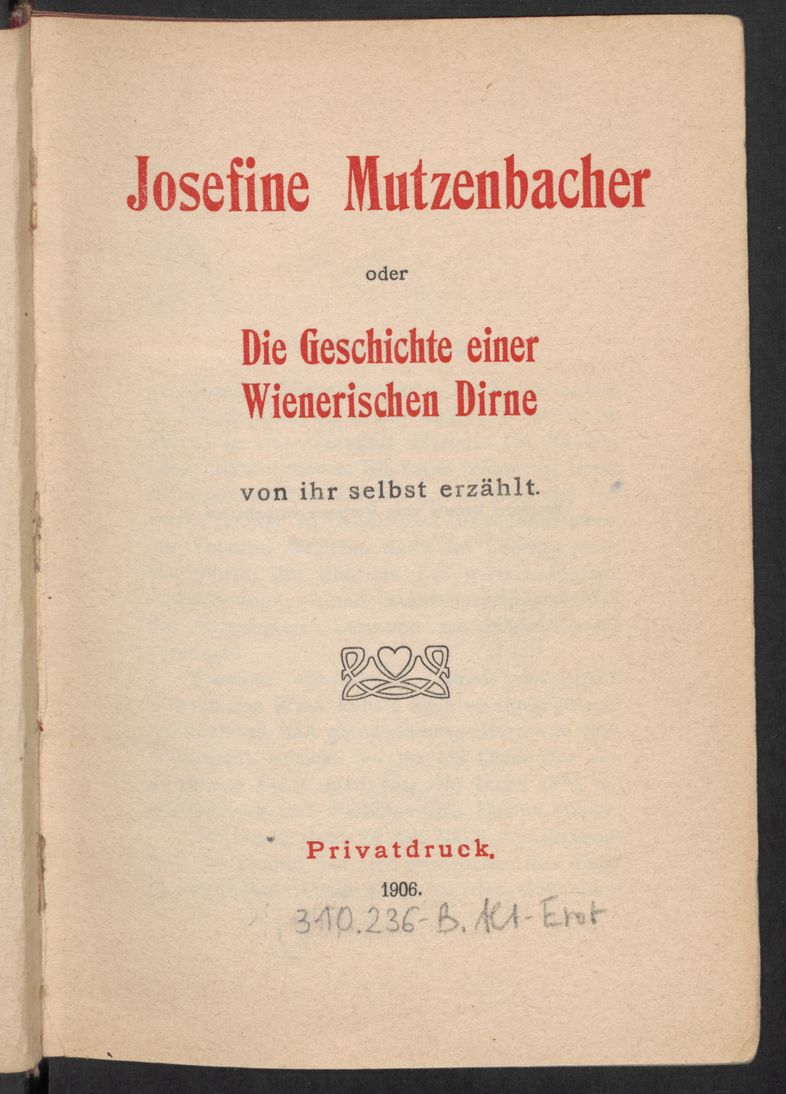
- Title page from 1906
- Author: Anon. (attributed to Felix Salten)
- Original title: Josefine Mutzenbacher oder Die Geschichte einer Wienerischen Dirne von ihr selbst erzählt
- Translator: Anon.
- Language: German
- Genre: Erotica
- Publication date: 1906
- Publication place: Austria
- English publication date: 1931/1967/1973/2018
- Media type: Print
- Pages: 383
- OCLC: 757734607

Josephine Mutzenbacher or The Story of a Viennese Whore, as Told by Herself (German: Josefine Mutzenbacher oder Die Geschichte einer Wienerischen Dirne von ihr selbst erzählt) is an erotic novel first published anonymously in Vienna, Austria, in 1906. The novel is famous in the German-speaking world, having been in print in both German and English for over 100 years and sold over 3 million copies, becoming an erotic bestseller.

Although no author claimed responsibility for the work, it was originally attributed to either Felix Salten or Arthur Schnitzler by the librarians at the University of Vienna. Today, critics, scholars, academics and the Austrian Government designate Salten as the sole author of the "pornographic classic". In 2022, a stylometric analysis showed that Felix Salten is the most probable author of the novel, the final pages excluded.

The original novel uses the specific local dialect of Vienna of that time in dialogues and is therefore used as a rare source of this dialect for linguists. It also describes, to some extent, the social and economic conditions of the lower class of that time. The novel has been translated into English, Swedish, Finnish, French, Spanish, Italian, Hungarian, Hebrew, Dutch, and Japanese among others, and been the subject of numerous films, theater productions, parodies, and university courses, as well as two sequels.

A critical, annotated edition of the German-language text was only published in 2021.

== Contents ==
=== Plot ===
The publisher's preface – formatted as an obituary and excluded from all English translations until 2018 – tells that Josefine left the manuscript to her physician before her death from complications after a surgery. Josefine Mutzenbacher was not her real name. The protagonist is said to have been born on 20 February 1852 in Vienna and died on 17 December 1904 at a sanatorium.

The plot device employed in Josephine Mutzenbacher is that of first-person narrative, structured in the format of a memoir. The story is told from the point of view of an accomplished aging 50-year-old Viennese courtesan who is looking back upon the sexual escapades she enjoyed during her unbridled youth in Vienna. Contrary to the title, almost the entirety of the book takes place when Josephine is between the ages of 5–13 years old, before she actually becomes a licensed prostitute in the brothels of Vienna. The book begins when she is five years old and ends when she is thirteen years old and starts her career as an unlicensed prostitute with a friend, to support her unemployed father.

Although the German-language text makes use of witty nicknames – for instance, the curate's genital is called "a hammer of mercy" – for human anatomy and sexual behavior, its content is entirely pornographic. The actual progression of events amounts to little more than a graphic, unapologetic description of the reckless sexuality exhibited by the heroine, all before reaching her 14th year. The style bears more than a passing resemblance to the Marquis de Sade's The 120 Days of Sodom in its unabashed "laundry list" cataloging of all manner of taboo sexual antics from children's sexual play, incest and rape to child prostitution, group sex, sado-masochism, lesbianism, and fellatio. In some constellations, Josefine appears as the active seducer, and sex is usually depicted as an uncomplicated, satisfactory experience.

=== Illustrations ===
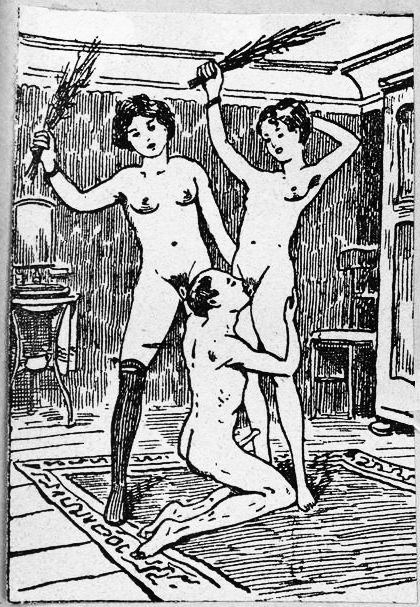
A sample illustration from a 1922 edition shows Pepi and Zenzi whipping a young male client.

The original Austrian publication was unillustrated, but a later pirated edition from 1922 contained black-and-white drawings, entirely pornographic as the text. These illustrations were bound in the archival copy of the first edition at the Austrian National Library, and have been reproduced at least in the hardcover edition of the 2018 English translation and in a 2019 Finnish translation, erroneously dated to 1906. Another illustrated German-language edition was published in the late 1960s in Liechtenstein with images by Jean Veenenbos (1932–2005).

Other illustrations have been created as well. The first English translation of 1931 was quickly pirated in New York and illustrated by Mahlon Blaine (1894–1969). The 1973 translation, Oh! Oh! Josephine, is illustrated with photographic stills from "the continental movie" of 1970, Josephine Mutzenbacher a.k.a. Naughty Knickers by Kurt Nachmann.

Also a Danish translation of 1967 contains illustrations. An incomplete Swedish translation from 1983 contains random photographs of prostitutes with scathing comments.

=== Interpretations ===
The novel Josefine Mutzenbacher has given rise to a multitude of interpretations. It has been listed both as child pornography and labeled as an apposite depiction of the milieu and manners of its time in Vienna, a travesty or a parody or a persiflage of a coming-of-age story or a novel of development, and mentioned as a rare case of a picaresque novel with a female protagonist. It has also been praised for its criticism of the bourgeois society.

The relation of the novel to the Freudian theory of sexuality has been subject to debate. The Swedish translator C.-M. Edenborg sees Josefine Mutzenbacher as an indictment of Freud's bourgeois psychology, whereas the Austrian psychoanalyst Désirée Prosquill thinks that not only are there marked thematic correspondences between Josefine Mutzenbacher (1906) and Three Essays on the Theory of Sexuality (1905) but Mutzenbacher also anticipates some issues concerning infantile sexuality that Freud added to his theory only later.

== Legal processes in German-speaking countries ==
=== Banned in Austria, 1913–1971 ===
The distribution of the novel Josefine Mutzenbacher was forbidden in Austria from 1913 on when it was taken into the list Catalogus Librorum in Austria Prohibitorum because of its obscenity.

In 1931, a bookseller called Josef Kunz was convicted in Vienna for a public act of obscenity because he had published a new edition of the novel, and the copies of the book were confiscated. In 1971, however, the Supreme Court of Austria decided that there was no longer any reason to punish a publisher for distributing the novel because there were artistic merits in the work. Still in 1988, there was another legal process to ban the novel because of obscenity, but this time, too, the Supreme Court judged in favour of the publisher.

=== The Mutzenbacher Decision ===
The Mutzenbacher Decision (Case BVerfGE 83,130) was a ruling of the Federal Constitutional Court of Germany (Bundesverfassungsgericht) on 27 November 1990 concerning whether or not the novel Josefine Mutzenbacher should be placed on a list of youth-restricted media. However, the significance of the case came to eclipse Josefine Mutzenbacher as an individual work, because it set a precedent as to which has a larger weight in German Law: Freedom of Expression or The Protection of Youth.

The final decision was made in 1992 at the Federal Constitutional Court (Bundesverfassungsgericht), putting the work once again on the list of "Media harming the youth" (Jungendgefährdenden Medien), forcing the right of Freedom of Expression (Under Article 5 III Fundamental rights) to step back.

==== Abstract ====
"Pornography and art are not mutually exclusive."

==== Preface ====
In Germany, there is a process known as indexing (German: Indizierung). The Bundesprüfstelle für jugendgefährdende Medien (BPjM or "Federal inspection department for youth-endangering media") collates books, movies, video games and music that could be harmful to young people because they contain violence, pornography, Nazism, hate speech, and similar dangerous content. The items are placed on the "List of youth-endangering media" (Liste jugendgefährdender Medien).

An item will stay on the list for 25 years, after which time the effects of the indexing will cease automatically.

Items that are indexed (placed on the list) cannot be bought by anyone under 18, are not allowed to be sold at regular bookstores or retailers that young people have access to, and are not allowed to be advertised in any manner. An item that is placed on the list becomes very difficult for adults to access as a result of these restrictions.

The issue underlying the Mutzenbacher Decision is not whether the book is legal for adults to buy, own, read, and sell – that is not disputed. The case concerns whether the intrinsic merit of the book as a work of art supersedes the potential harm its controversial contents could have on the impressionable minds of minors and whether or not it should be "indexed".

==== The history ====
In the 1960s, two separate publishing houses made new editions of the original 1906 Josefine Mutzenbacher. In 1965 Dehli Publishers of Copenhagen, Denmark, published a two volume edition, and in 1969 the German publisher Rogner & Bernhard in Munich printed another edition with a glossary by Oswald Wiener. The BPjM placed Josefine Mutzenbacher on its list, after two criminal courts declared the pornographic content of the book obscene.

The BPjM maintained that the book was pornographic and dangerous to minors because it contained explicit descriptions of sexual promiscuity, child prostitution, and incest as its exclusive subject matter, and promoted these activities as positive, insignificant, and even humorous behaviors in a manner devoid of any artistic value. The BPjM stated that the contents of the book justified it being placed on the "list of youth-endangering media" so that its availability to minors would be restricted.

In 1978 a third publishing house attempted to issue a new edition of Josefine Mutzenbacher that included a foreword and omitted the "glossary of Viennese vulgarisms" from the 1969 version. The BPjM again placed Josefine Mutzenbacher on its "list of youth-endangering media," and the Rowohlt Publishing house filed an appeal with the Federal Constitutional Court of Germany on the grounds that Josefine Mutzenbacher was a work of art that minors should not be restricted from reading.

==== The decision ====
On 27 November 1990 the Federal Constitutional Court of Germany made what is now known as "The Mutzenbacher Decision". The Court prefaced their verdict by referring to two other seminal freedom of expression cases from previous German Case Law, the Mephisto decision and the Anachronistischer Zug decision. The court ruled that under the German constitution (Grundgesetz) chapter about Freedom of Art (Kunstfreiheit), the novel Josefine Mutzenbacher was both pornography and art, and that the former is not sufficient to deny the latter.

In plain English, even though the contents of Josefine Mutzenbacher are pornographic, they are still considered art and in the process of indexing the book, the aspect of freedom of art has to be considered. The court's ruling forced the BPjM to temporarily remove the Rowohlt edition of Josefine Mutzenbacher from its list of youth-endangering media.

==== Aftermath, 1992–2017 ====
The book was added to the list again in November 1992 in a new decision by the BPjM that considered the aspect of freedom of art but deemed the aspect of protecting children to be more important. Some later editions of the book by other publishers were added to the list as well.

Again, the publisher appealed to the Administrative Court (Verwaltungsgericht) of Cologne and won the case in 1995. However, the BPjM appealed for its part and won in September 1997 at the higher instance, Oberverwaltungsgericht, and the Federal Administrative Court (Bundesverwaltungsgericht) refused further appeal in February 1998.

Therefore Josefine Mutzenbacher was taken into the list for 25 years. After this period of time had passed and the indexing ceased, the BPjM decided in November 2017 that there was no longer any reason to list the book anew. According to the BPjM, one reason was that, because of the archaic language and parodic style of depiction, the book was no longer considered to conduce its readers to imitate the abusive sexual practices described within. The BPjM also noted that according to current scholarly opinion, the book shows remarkable literary merit, for instance, by tending to present new perspectives to autobiographical works of literature.

=== The copyright process of the heirs ===
In 1976 the heirs of Felix Salten – more precisely, his granddaughter Lea Wyler – demanded the German publishing company Rogner & Bernhard to stop distributing the novel Josefine Mutzenbacher and to pay royalties. In response, the company asked for "decisive evidence" for Salten's authorship. The heirs could not provide such evidence.

Ten years later, in June 1986, the heirs instituted an action at the Munich Landgericht court against Rogner & Bernhard, claiming that Salten's authorship could be proven, although they only provided circumstantial evidence. The court, however, did not examine the question of authorship because, according to the old German Copyright Act, the anonymously published novel had become Public Domain in 1957 and the copyright could no longer be reinstituted; that is, Salten's heirs should have declared the authorship before the end of 1956. So, the case was ruled in favour of the publishing company in May 1988.

The heirs appealed to Munich Oberlandesgericht court but lost there in July 1989 and, subsequently, also lost at the Federal Court of Justice in early 1990.

== Derivative works ==
=== Literature ===
==== Sequels ====
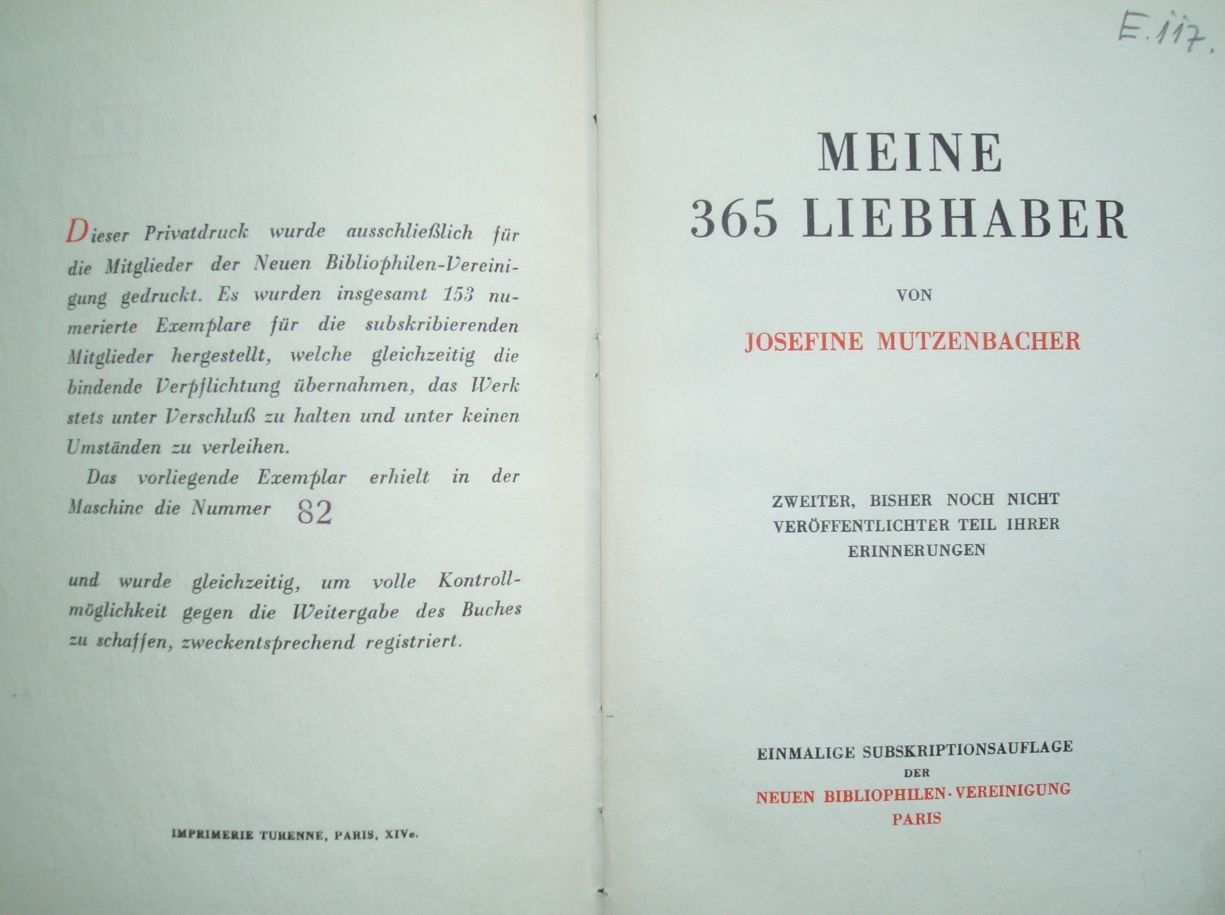
Volume 2: Meine 365 Liebhaber (first edition, c. 1925)

Two novels, also written anonymously, which present a continuation of the original Josephine Mutzenbacher, have been published. However, they are not generally ascribed to Felix Salten.

- Josefine Mutzenbacher: Meine 365 Liebhaber. [My 365 Lovers.] Paris: Neue Bibliophilen-Vereinigung, ca. 1925.
- Josephine Mutzenbacher: Meine Tochter Peperl. [My Daughter Peperl.] München: Heyne, 1974. ISBN 3-453-50056-3

Also the sequels have been translated into many languages. For instance, Oh! Oh! Josephine: Volume 2 from 1973 is an English rendering of Meine 365 Liebhaber.

==== Works influenced by Josephine Mutzenbacher ====
In 2000 the Austrian writer Franzobel published the novel Scala Santa oder Josefine Wurznbachers Höhepunkt (Scala Santa, or Josefine Wurznbacher's Climax). The title's similarity to Josephine Mutzenbacher, being only two letters different, is a play on words that is not just coincidence. The book's content is derivative as well, telling the story of the character "Pepi Wurznbacher" and her first sexual experience at age six.

The name "Pepi Wurznbacher" is taken directly from the pages of Josephine Mutzenbacher; "Pepi" was Josephine Mutzenbacher's nickname in the early chapters. Franzobel has said that he wanted his novel to be a retelling of the Josephine Mutzenbacher story set in modern day. He simply took the characters, plot elements and setting from Josephine Mutzenbacher and reworked them into a thoroughly modernized version that occurs in the 1990s. He was inspired to write the novel after being astounded at both the prevalence of child abuse stories in the German press and having read Josephine Mutzenbacher's blatantly unapologetic depiction of the same.

=== Film ===
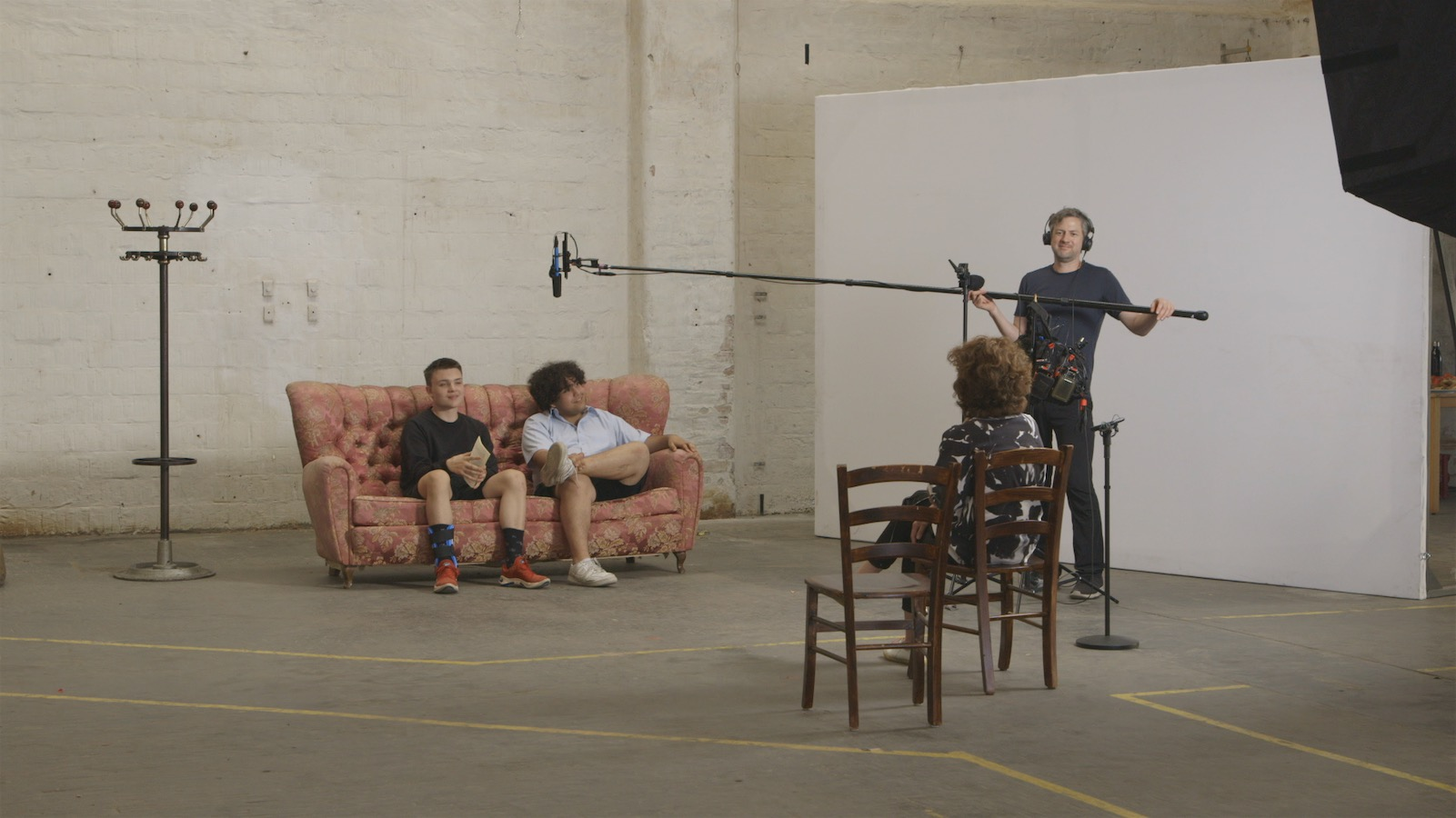
Shooting the documentary Mutzenbacher (2022). © Ruth Beckermann Filmproduktion.

The three titles directed by Kurt Nachmann are sexploitation films. In Auch Fummeln will gelernt sein, the male lead ("Peter Planer") plays a sexually dysfunctional army officer who is about to be married. Christine Schuberth reprises her role as a prostitute indistinguishable from the Josephine of the first two films, although in this one she is called Pepi. She correctly diagnoses the soldier's problem as his addiction to pornography and voyeuristic fantasy. The film ends with the soldier and his fiancée tumbling into bed as a copy of Salten's novel is consumed by flames.

The two series directed by Hans Billian and Gunter Otto are pornographic films. The first of them, Billian's Josefine Mutzenbacher wie sie wirklich war, 1. Teil, is routinely cited as one of the best films to emerge from pornography's so-called golden age, thanks to Billian's inventive direction and the unselfconscious charm of Patricia Rhomberg. Gunter Otto served as producer on the first film, but he and Billian then parted ways, with each directing his own series of sequels. Billian's Das Haus der geheimen Lüste (1979) is an unrelated pornographic feature in nineteenth-century costume that has been reissued as a Josephine Mutzenbacher film. The last two Gunter Otto films are set in modern times and do not seriously pretend to inhabit the Mutzenbacher universe.

For Mutzenbacher, Ruth Beckermann filmed a hundred men reading from and reacting to Salten's novel in what was supposedly a casting call for a new movie adaptation. She uses their responses to build a picture of male sexual attitudes, particularly attitudes to female sexuality. The documentary won the Encounters Award at the 72nd Berlin International Film Festival.

Year	German Title	Translation	Josephine	Director	Studio	English Title
1970	Josefine Mutzenbacher	Josephine Mutzenbacher	Christine Schuberth	Kurt Nachmann	Lisa-Film	Naughty Knickers (UK)
1971	Josefine Mutzenbacher II Meine 365 Liebhaber	Josephine Mutzenbacher II, my 365 lovers	Christine Schuberth	Kurt Nachmann	Lisa-Film	Don't Get your Knickers in a Twist (UK)
1972	Auch Fummeln will gelernt sein	Even fumbling has to be learned	Christine Schuberth	Kurt Nachmann	Lisa-Film	Teach Me (USA)
1976	Josefine Mutzenbacher wie sie wirklich war, 1. Teil	Josephine Mutzenbacher as she really was, part 1	Patricia Rhomberg	Hans Billian	Gunter Otto Produktion	Sensational Janine (USA)
1978	Die Beichte der Josefine Mutzenbacher	The confession of Josephine Mutzenbacher	Jane Iwanoff	Hans Billian	Starlight-Film	
1980	Josefine Mutzenbacher wie sie wirklich war, 2. Teil	Josephine Mutzenbacher as she really was, part 2	Leila Vigsö	Gunter Otto	Atlantis-Film	The Way She Was (USA)
1981	Aus dem Tagebuch der Josefine Mutzenbacher	From the diary of Josephine Mutzenbacher	Andrea Werdien	Hans Billian	Alois Brummer Filmproduktion	Professional Janine (USA)
1982	Josefine Mutzenbacher wie sie wirklich war, 3. Teil	Josephine Mutzenbacher as she really was, part 3	Uschi Karnat as Sandra Nova	Gunter Otto	Atlantis-Film	
1982	Josefine Mutzenbacher wie sie wirklich war, 4. Teil	Josephine Mutzenbacher as she really was, part 4	Uschi Karnat as Sandra Nova	Gunter Otto	Atlantis-Film	
1983	Josefine Mutzenbacher wie sie heute wär, 5. Teil, Dauernd erregt, erotische Männerträume	Josephine Mutzenbacher as she would be today, part 5, constantly aroused, men's erotic dreams	Renate Huber (aka Renate Überle) as Carmen Chevalier	Gunter Otto	Atlantis-Film	
1984	Josefine Mutzenbacher wie sie heute wär, 6. Teil, Die Nacht der wilden Schwän(z)e	Josephine Mutzenbacher as she would be today, part 6, the night of the wild swans (Schwäne) or cocks (Schwänze)	Renate Huber (aka Renate Überle) as Carmen Chevalier	Gunter Otto	Atlantis-Film	
1987	Das Lustschloss der Josefine Mutzenbacher	The pleasure palace of Josephine Mutzenbacher	Desirée Bernardy	Hans Billian	Hit-Film	Insatiable Janine (USA)
1990	Die amourösen Erlebnisse der Josefine Mutzenbacher mit Napoleon Bonaparte	The amorous adventures of Josephine Mutzenbacher and Napoleon Bonaparte	Renate Muhri	Jürgen Enz	Movie Star	
1991	Josefine Mutzenbacher, die Hure von Wien	Josephine Mutzenbacher, the whore of Vienna	Juliane W. (aka Julia Frocha) as Vanessa Velvet	Hans Billian	Televideo Filmproduktion	
2022	Mutzenbacher	Mutzenbacher	—	Ruth Beckermann	Ruth Beckermann Filmproduktion	

=== Theater and cabaret ===
The Viennese a cappella quartet called 4she regularly performs a cabaret musical theatre production based on Josephine Mutzenbacher called "The 7 Songs of Josefine Mutzenbacher" ("Die 7 Lieder der Josefine Mutzenbacher"). The show is a raunchy, humorous parody of the novel, set in a brothel, that runs approximately 75 minutes.

In 2002 the German actor Jürgen Tarrach and the jazz group CB-funk performed a live rendition of the texts of Josephine Mutzenbacher and Shakespeare set to modern music composed by Bernd Weißig and arranged by the pianist Detlef Bielke of the Günther-Fischer-Quintett at the Kalkscheune in Berlin.

In January 2005, Austrian actress Ulrike Beimpold gave several comedy cabaret live performances of the text of Josephine Mutzenbacher at the Auersperg15-Theater in Vienna, Austria.

In an event organized by the Jazzclub Regensburg, Werner Steinmassl held a live musical reading of Josephine Mutzenbacher, accompanied by Andreas Rüsing, at the Leeren Beutel Concert Hall in Ratisbon, Bavaria, Germany called "Werner Steinmassl reads Josefine Mutzenbacher" on 3 September 2005.

=== Audio adaptations ===
Both the original Josephine Mutzenbacher and the two "sequels" are available as spoken word audio CDs read by Austrian actress Ulrike Beimpold:

- Josefine Mutzenbacher oder Die Geschichte einer Wienerischen Dirne von ihr selbst erzählt. Random House Audio 2006. ISBN 3-86604-253-1.
- Josefine Mutzenbacher und ihre 365 Liebhaber. Audio CD. Götz Fritsch. Der Audio Verlag 2006. ISBN 3-89813-484-9.

In 1997 Helmut Qualtinger released "Fifi Mutzenbacher", a parody on audio CD:

- Fifi Mutzenbacher (Eine Porno-Parodie). Helmut Qualtinger (reader). Audio CD. Preiser Records (Naxos) 1997.

=== Exhibits ===
The Jewish Museum of Vienna displayed an exhibit at the Palais Eskeles called "Felix Salten: From Josephine Mutzenbacher to Bambi" where the life and work of Felix Salten was on display, which ran from December 2006 to March 2007. Austrian State Parliament Delegate Elisabeth Vitouch appeared for the opening of the exhibit at Jewish Museum Vienna and declared: "Everyone knows Bambi and Josefine Mutzenbacher even today, but the author Felix Salten is today to a large extent forgotten".

=== Academia ===
Josephine Mutzenbacher has been included in several university courses and symposiums.

- Pornography: Writing of Prostitutes COL 289 SP – Weissman, Hope Wesleyan University
- Der Sex-Akt in der Literatur. Zur Geschichte u. Repräsentation des Sex-Aktes im Spannungsfeld von "hoher Literatur, Trivialliteratur u. Pornographie" 641500 Study section, Comparative Literature Science – Babka, Anna Universität Innsbruck
- Sexuality, Eroticism, and Gender in Austrian Literature and Culture Annual Conference of the Modern Austrian Literature and Culture Association International Symposium University of Alberta 13–15 April 2007
- Literatur und Sexualität um 1900 SS 2001 510.273 – Rabelhofer, Bettina Karl-Franzens-Universität Graz

== Translations ==
There are several English translations of Josefine Mutzenbacher, some of which, however, are pirated editions of each other. Until 2018, all the English translations were missing the original publisher's introduction.

When checked against the German text, the translations differ, and the original chapter and paragraph division is usually not followed, except for the 2018 edition. The original novel is divided only in two long chapters, but most translated editions disrupt the text, each in their own way, into 20–30 chapters, sometimes with added chapter titles.

The 1973 edition, Oh! Oh! Josephine, claims to be "uncensored and uncut", but actually it is incomplete and censored, e.g., obfuscating references to anal intercourse. All these issues are replicated in the 1975 Finnish translation which is made via this English edition.

The first anonymous English translation from 1931 is abridged and leaves part of the sentences untranslated; the 1967 translation by Rudolf Schleifer, however, contains large inauthentic expansions, as shown in the following comparison:

1931 edition	1967 edition (Schleifer)	1973 edition	2018 edition
My father was a very poor man who worked as a saddler in Josef City. We lived in a tenement house away out in Ottakring, at that time a new house, which was filled from top to bottom with the poorer class of tenants. All of the tenants had many children, who were forced to play in the back yards, which were much too small for so many. I had two older brothers. My father and my mother and we three children lived in two rooms... a living-room and kitchen. We also had a roomer. The other tenants, probably fifty in all, came and went, sometimes in a friendly way, more often in anger. Most of them disappeared and we never heard from them again. I distinctly remember two of our roomers. One was a locksmith-apprentice. He had dark eyes and was a sad-looking lad; his black eyes and lark face always were covered with grime and soot. We children were very much afraid of him. He was a very silent man, never saying a word. I remember one afternoon, when I was alone in the house, he came home. I was then only five years old. My mother and my two brothers had gone to Furstenfeld and my father had not yet returned from work. The locksmith took me up from the floor, where I was playing, and held me on his lap. I wanted to cry, but he quietly told me: "Be quiet, I won't hurt you".	My father was a very poor journeyman saddler who worked from morning till evening in a shop in the Josefstadt, as the eighth district of Vienna is called. In order to be there at seven in the morning, he had to get up at five and leave half an hour later to catch the horse-drawn streetcar that delivered him after one and a half-hour's ride at a stop near his working place. "Suburbia" in the Vienna of the mid-19th century did not necessarily mean a residential section for the well-to-do middle-class, as in modern times. Rich people did live in the outer districts to the north and northwest, but the western and southern suburbs constituted what we called the "workers' ghetto". There, in gloomy tenement houses about five stories high, lived all the Viennese who were not white-collar workers. Our tenement building, filled from top to bottom with poor folk, was in the seventeenth district, called Ottakring. Nobody who never visited those tenement houses can imagine the unsanitary, primitive living conditions under which we spent our childhood and adolescence, and—in most cases—the rest of our poor lives. My parents, and my two brothers and I lived in a so-called apartment that consisted of one room and a kitchen. That was the size of all the apartments in our building and in most of the other buildings of the district. Most tenants had a lot of children who swarmed all over the buildings and crowded the small courtyards in the summer. Since I and my two older brothers made up only a "small" family, compared with the families around us having at least half a dozen brats, my parents could afford to make a little money by accepting roomers. Such roomers, who had to share our one room and a kitchen with the whole family, were called "sleepers", because the tiny rent one could charge them was for a small, iron folding bed that was placed in the kitchen at night. I remember several dozens of such sleepers who stayed with us for a while, one after another. Some left because they found work out of town, some, because they quarreled too much with my father, and others simply did not show up one evening, thus creating a vacancy for the next one. Among all those sleepers there were two who clearly stand out in my memory. One was a dark-haired young fellow with sad eyes who made a scant living as a locksmith's apprentice and hardly ever washed his sooty face. We children were a little afraid of him, perhaps because of his blackened face and also because he hardly said anything. One afternoon I was alone in our place playing with what was supposed to be a doll on the floor. My mother had taken my two brothers to a nearby empty lot that was covered with wild grass and shrubbery where the boys could play, and my father was not yet home from work. The young sleeper came home quite unexpectedly and, as usual, did not say a word. When he saw me playing on the floor, he picked me up, sat down and put me on his knees. When he noticed that I was about to cry, he whispered fiercely, "Shut your mouth! I'm not going to hurt you!"	My father was the anaemic apprentice of a saddler and worked in Josefstadt, a suburb of Vienna. We lived even further out, in a tenement building which, in those days, was relatively new. Even so it was crowded from top to bottom with poor families which had so many children that, in summer, the courtyard was too small to contain us all. I had two brothers, both of whom were some years older than myself, and the five of us, my mother, father and us three kids, lived in one room and a kitchen. In addition there was always a lodger. Altogether, we must have had fifty of these lodgers. They came and went, one after another. Sometimes they fitted in well enough, but sometimes they were a nuisance. Most of them disappeared without a trace and were never heard of again. One of these lodgers, whom I remember particularly well, was an apprentice locksmith, a dark, sad-featured young chap who had tiny black eyes and a face that was always covered with soot. His appearance, and the fact that he hardly ever spoke a word, made us children really scared of him. I still remember one afternoon when he came home early. I was about five at the time and was alone in the flat, playing quietly on the floor. My mother had taken the boys on to the common and my father had not yet returned from work. The young locksmith picked me up from the floor and sat me on his knee. I began to whimper, but he whispered nastily: 'Shut up. I ain't gonna do nuffin' to yer.'	My father was a penniless saddle-maker's help who worked in a shop in Josefstadt. Our tenement building, at that time a new one, filled from top to bottom with poor folk, was far in Ottakring. All of these people had so many children that they over-crowded the small courtyards in the summer. I myself had two older brothers, both of whom were a couple of years older than I. My father, my mother, and we three children lived in a kitchen and a room, and had also one lodger. Several dozens of such lodgers stayed with us for a while, one after another; they appeared and vanished, some friendly, some quarrelsome, and most of them disappeared without a trace, and we never heard from them. Among all those lodgers there were two who clearly stand out in my memory. One was a locksmith's apprentice, a dark-haired young fellow with a sad look and always a thoroughly sooty face. We children were afraid of him. He was quiet, too, and rarely spoke much. I remember how one afternoon he came home when I was alone in our place. I was at that time five years old and was playing on the floor of the room. My mother was with the two boys in Fürstenfeld, my father not yet home from work. The apprentice picked me up, sat down and hold me on his knees. I was about to cry, but he whispered fiercely, "Lay still, I do you nothin'!"

== Reception ==
Kathryn Schulz of The New Yorker stated that in the novel's era, the main character's "unapologetic embrace of her career" was the bulk of the negative reception, while in 2022, "what is most shocking about the book is Josefine’s youth."

== Analysis ==
According to Schulz, multiple academics tried to compare Josephine Mutzenbacher and Bambi. Shulz argued that trying to find similarities would be a "strained" act.

== Selected editions ==
- Josefine Mutzenbacher oder Die Geschichte einer Wienerischen Dirne von ihr selbst erzählt. 1906.
- Memoirs of Josefine Mutzenbacher: The Story of a Viennese Prostitute. Translated from the German and Privately Printed. “Paris” [i.e. New York?], 1931.
- Memoirs of Josefine Mutzenbacher. Illustrated by Mahlon Blaine. “Paris” [i.e. New York?], 1931.
- The Memoirs of Josephine Mutzenbacher. Translated by Paul J. Gillette. Los Angeles, Holloway House, 1966.
- The Memoirs of Josephine Mutzenbacher: The Intimate Confessions of a Courtesan. Translated by Rudolf Schleifer [Hilary E. Holt]. Introduction by Hilary E. Holt, PhD. North Hollywood, Brandon House, 1967.
- Memoirs of Josephine M. Complete and unexpurgated. Continental Classics Erotica Book, 113. Continental Classics, 1967.
- Oh! Oh! Josephine 1–2. London, King's Road Publishing, 1973. ISBN 0-284-98498-1 (vol. 1), ISBN 0-284-98499-X (vol. 2)
- Josefine Mutzenbacher or The Story of a Viennese Wench, as Told by Herself. Translated by Ilona J. Hämäläinen-Bauer. Helsinki, Books on Demand, 2018. ISBN 978-952-80-0655-8
- Ruthner, Clemens; Strasser, Melanie; Schmidt, Matthias, eds. (2021). Josefine Mutzenbacher: Kritische Ausgabe nach dem Erstdruck mit Beiträgen von Oswald Wiener (in German). Wien: Sonderzahl. ISBN 978-3-85449-574-1.

== See also ==
- Fanny Hill
