= Hannelore Auer =

Austrian singer and actress (1942–2023)

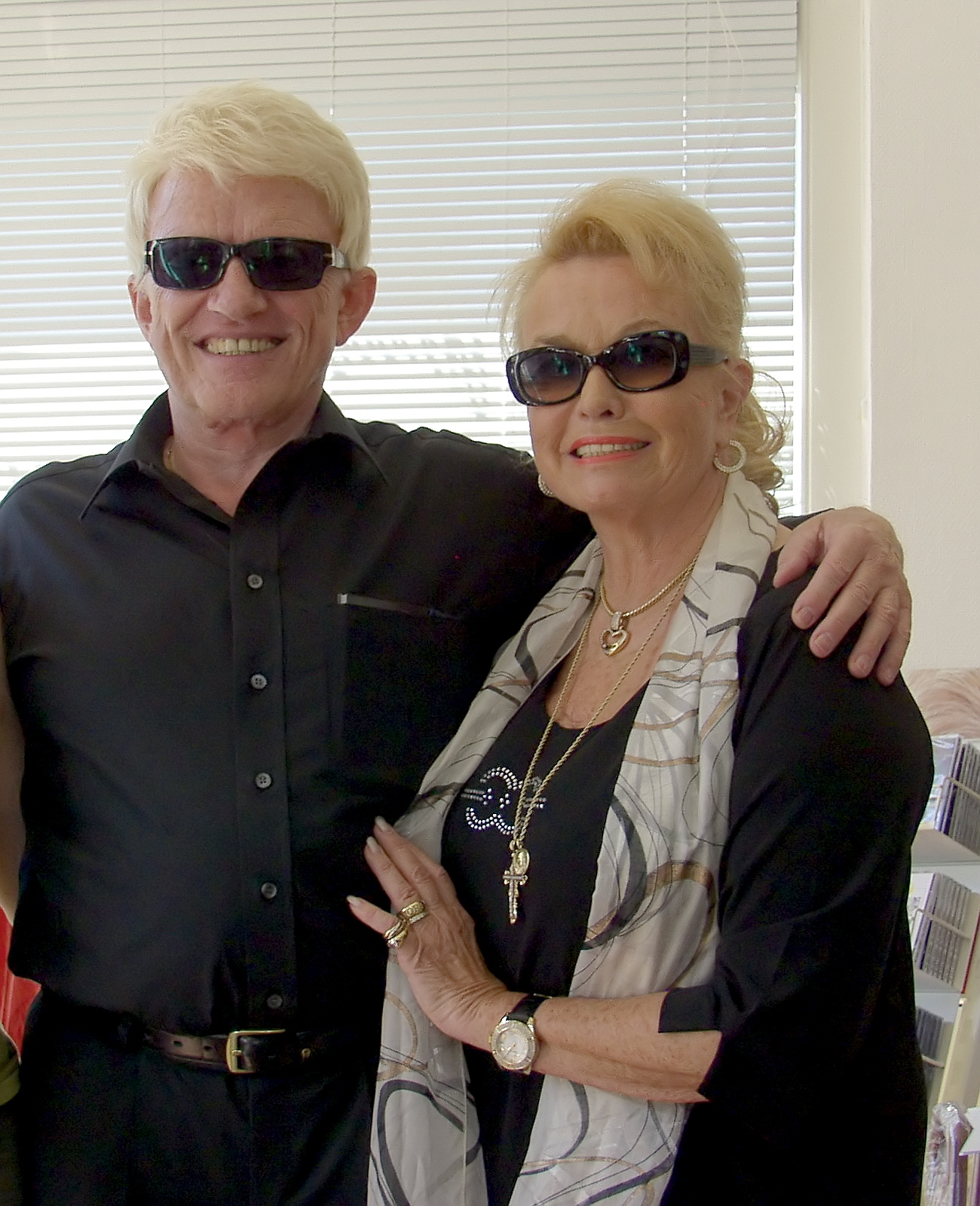
- Heino and Hannelore Kramm in 2008
- Born: 30 May 1942; Linz, Alpen- und Donau-Reichsgaue, Germany
- Died: 8 November 2023 (aged 81)
- Occupations: Singer, film actress
- Spouses: Alfred Auersperg (m. 1968–1979) Heino (m. 1979)

Hannelore Kramm née Auer (30 May 1942 – 8 November 2023) was an Austrian Schlager singer and film actress who managed the German singer Heino.

== Biography ==
Auer was romantically linked with Franz Antel and appeared in the Frau Wirtin series of the director. In 1968, she married Austrian prince Alfred (von) Auersperg (1936–1992) and after their divorce in 1979, married Heino. Heino has a son Uwe from his first marriage and an illegitimate daughter Petra, who died by suicide in 2003. Hannelore herself did not have any children. She died on 8 November 2023, at the age of 81.

== Selected filmography ==
- I'm Marrying the Director (1960)
- Our Crazy Nieces (1963)
- Don't Fool with Me (1963)
- ...denn die Musik und die Liebe in Tirol (1963)
- The Merry Wives of Tyrol (1964)
- Schweik's Awkward Years (1964)
- Holiday in St. Tropez (1964)
- Hotel of Dead Guests (1965)
- Ich kauf mir lieber einen Tirolerhut (I prefer to buy a Tyrolean hat) (1965)
- Come to the Blue Adriatic (1966)
- The Sinful Village (1966)
- The Sweet Sins of Sexy Susan (1967)
- Sexy Susan Sins Again (1968)
