= Thomas Alder =

German actor (1932–1968)

- Born: 1 January 1932; Murnau am Staffelsee, Germany
- Died: 6 May 1968 (aged 36); Munich, West Germany
- Occupation: actor

Thomas Alder (1 January 1932 in Murnau am Staffelsee, Germany – 6 May 1968 in Munich, West Germany) was a German actor.

== Selected filmography ==
- The Crimson Circle (1960)
- Hit Parade 1960 (1960)
- We Will Never Part (1960)
- The Sand Runs Red (1962)
- Two Bavarians in Bonn (1962)
- Massacre at Marble City (1964)
- Holiday in St. Tropez (1964)
- 13 Days to Die (1965)
- The Sinful Village (1966)
- Come to the Blue Adriatic (1966)
- Per un pugno di canzoni (1966)
