= Come to the Blue Adriatic =

1966 film

- Directed by: Lothar Gündisch
- Written by: José María Alonso Pesquera; Hans Billian; Esther Cruz
- Starring: Dietmar Schönherr; Hannelore Auer; Gustavo Rojo
- Cinematography: Manuel Hernández Sanjuán; Gerhard Krüger
- Edited by: Antonio Gimeno
- Music by: Gert Wilden
- Production companies: C.I.C.E.; Carthago C.C.
- Distributed by: Ceres-Filmverleih
- Release date: 21 January 1966
- Running time: 93 minutes
- Countries: West Germany; Spain
- Language: German

Come to the Blue Adriatic (German: Komm mit zur blauen Adria) is a 1966 Spanish-West German comedy film directed by Lothar Gündisch and starring Dietmar Schönherr, Hannelore Auer and Gustavo Rojo. In Spain it was known as The Red Bikini (Spanish: El bikini rojo).

Although set on the Adriatic Sea, it was actually shot on the Costa del Sol around Málaga.

== Cast ==
- Dietmar Schönherr as Walter Thomas
- Hannelore Auer as Ingrid
- Gustavo Rojo as Sr. Hernández
- Maria Brockerhoff as Renate
- Margitta Scherr as Tina
- Thomas Alder as Heribert Kindlein
- Ruth Stephan as Frl. Habicht
- Fritz Benscher as Hugo Becker
- Uschi Mumoth as Lilo
- Hannelore Hartline as Helen
- Sadie Mertzger as Katja
- Johanna König as Frl. Schnebeli
- Manfred Schnelldorfer as Joachim
- Vivi Bach as Sängerin
- Roy Etzel as Trompeter

== Bibliography ==
- Francesc Llinàs. Directores de fotografía del cine español. Filmoteca Española, 1989.
