= Max Emanuel Ainmiller =

German artist and glass painter (1807–1870)

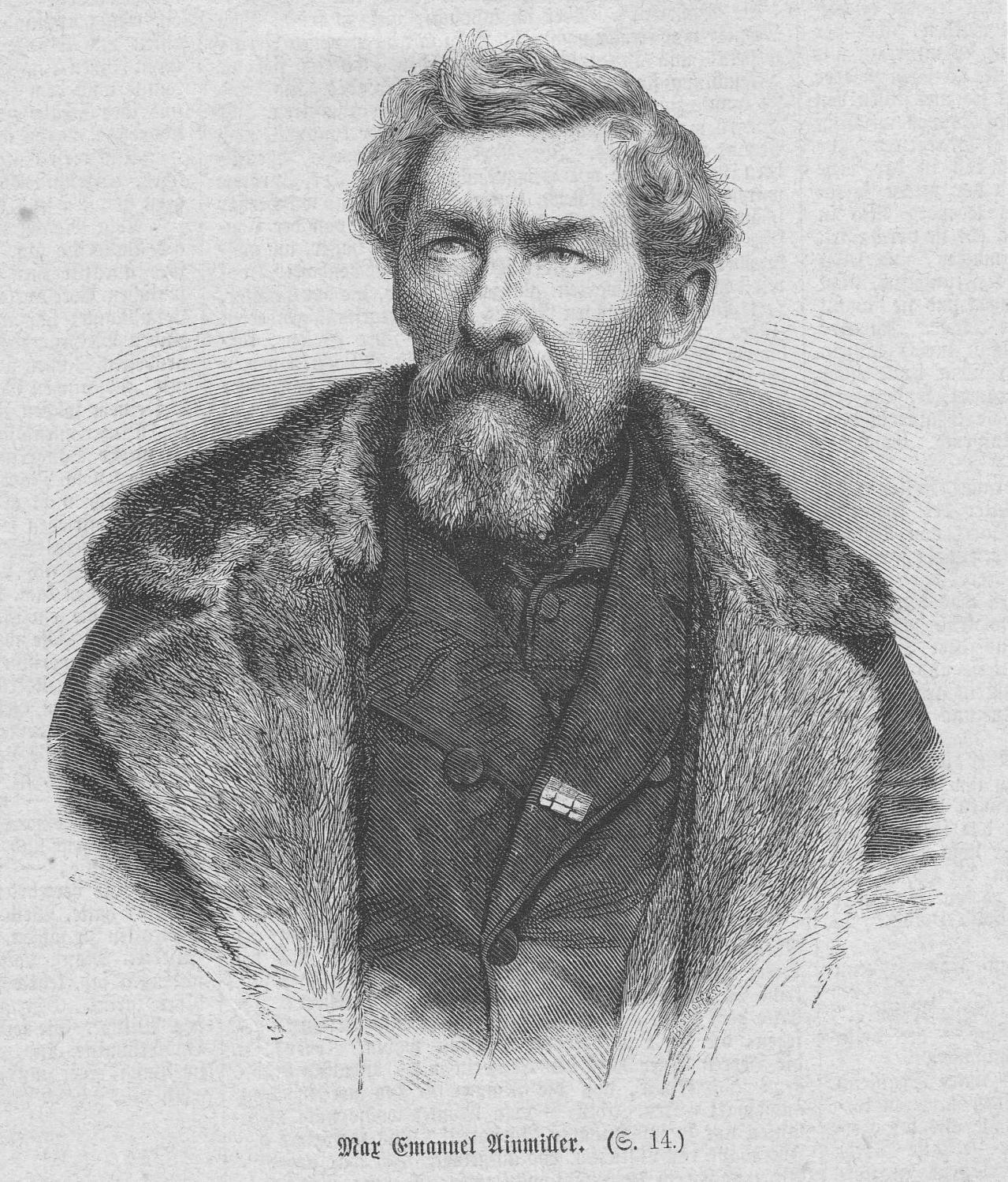
- Maximilian Emanuel Ainmüller, desenho cerca de 1860
- Born: 14 February 1807; Munich
- Died: 9 December 1870 (aged 63)
- Occupation: Glass painter

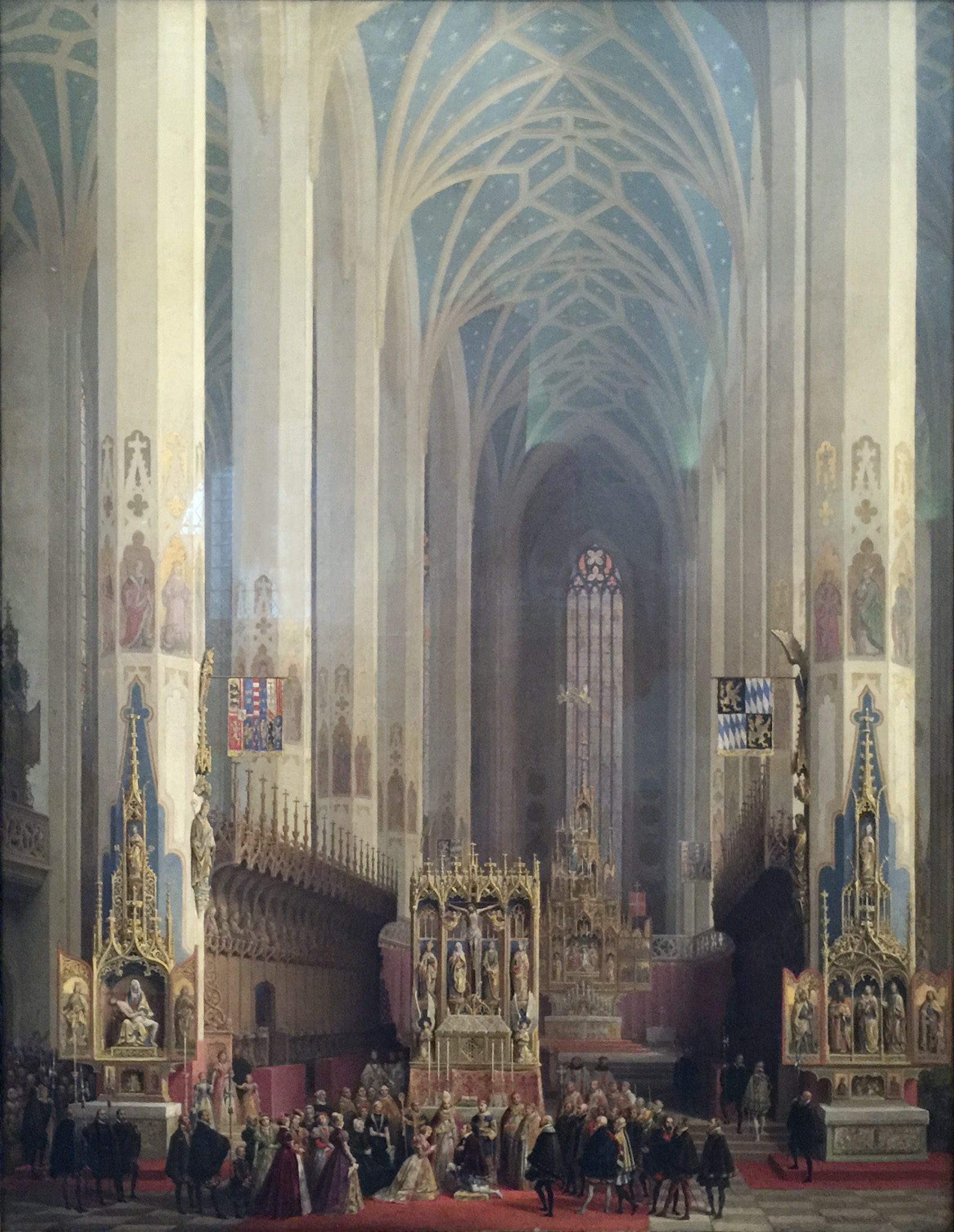
The Wedding of Wilhelm V and Renata of Lorraine

Maximilian Emanuel Ainmiller (14 February 1807 – 9 December 1870) was a German artist and glass painter.

He was born in Munich. Under the tutorage of Friedrich von Gärtner, director of the royal Nymphenburg Porcelain Manufactory, Ainmiller studied glass painting, both as a mechanical process and as an art, at the Academy of Fine Arts in Munich. In 1828 he was appointed director of the newly founded royal painted-glass manufactory at Munich. The method which he gradually perfected there was a development of the enamel process adopted in the Renaissance, and consisted in actually painting the design upon the glass, which was subjected, as each colour was laid on, to carefully adjusted heating.

The earliest specimens of Ainmiller's work are to be found in the cathedral of Regensburg. With a few exceptions, all the windows in Glasgow cathedral are from his hand. Specimens may also be seen in St Paul's Cathedral and Peterhouse, Cambridge, and the Cologne Cathedral contains some of his finest productions. Ainmiller had considerable skill as an oil-painter, especially in interiors, his pictures of the Chapel Royal at Windsor Castle and of Westminster Abbey being much admired, the latter of which is displayed in the gallery of the Neue Pinakothek in Munich. He is buried in the Alter Südfriedhof in Munich.

Maximilian was also mentor to many famous painters, including future son-in-law David Dalhoff Neal, and grandfather to dramatist Max Neal, and composer Heinrich Neal who was born a few months prior to his death. A street, Ainmillerstrasse, named in his memory, is located in the Munich district of Schwabing.

== See also ==
- List of German painters
