= Claus Biederstaedt =

German actor (1928–2020)

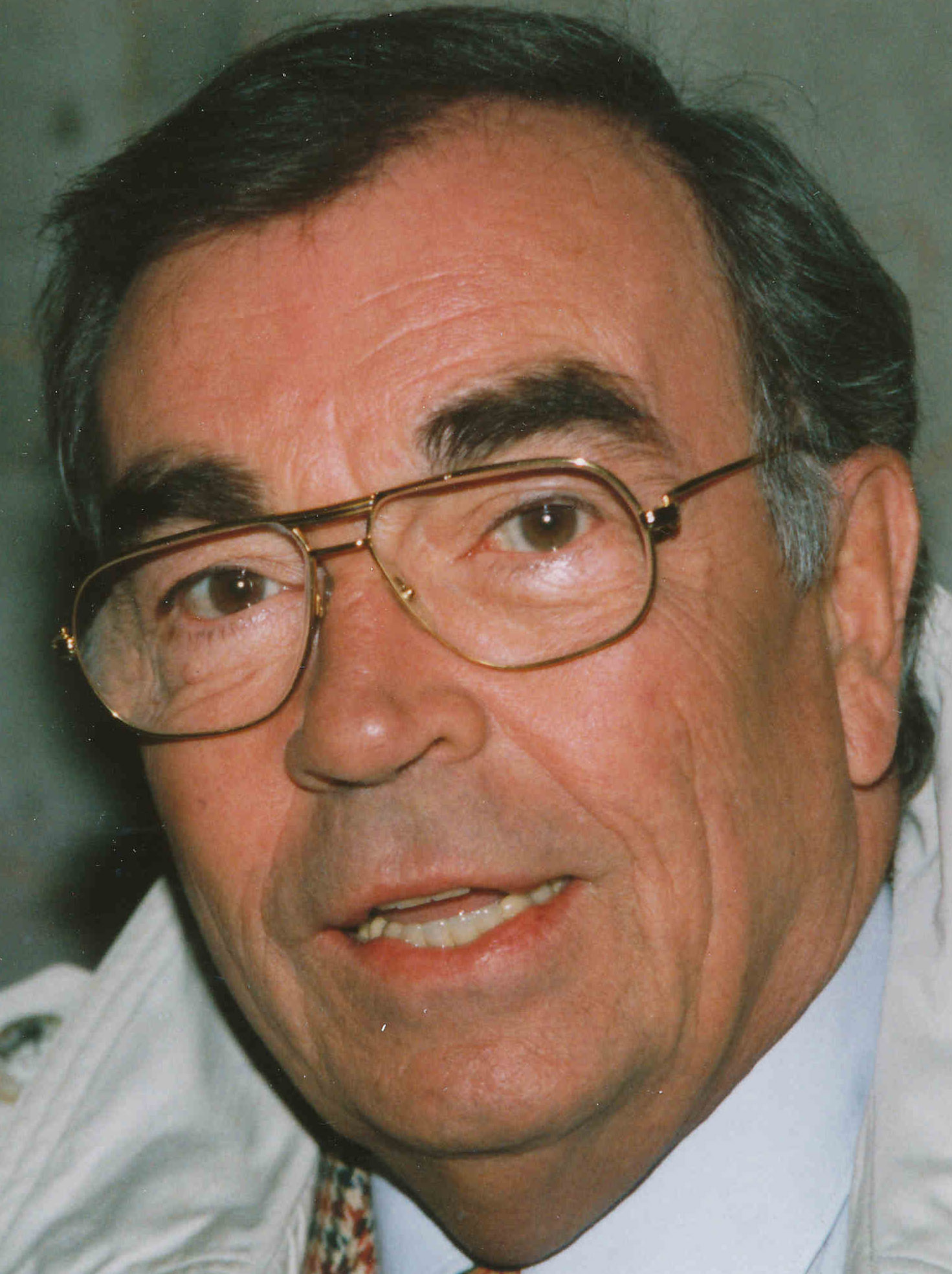
- Born: 28 June 1928; Stargard, Pomerania, Prussia, Germany
- Died: 18 June 2020 (aged 91)
- Occupations: Actor, film director, film producer
- Years active: 1952–2020

Claus Biederstaedt (28 June 1928 – 18 June 2020) was a German actor. He studied in Hamburg and began his career working with Joseph Offenbach. Among the actors for whom he dubbed were Yves Montand, Peter Falk, Marlon Brando, Vittorio Gassman, and James Garner.

== Selected filmography ==
- The Great Temptation (1952) - Famulus Huber
- A Musical War of Love (1953) - Rautenkranz
- Arlette Conquers Paris (1953) - Student Marc Tissier
- I and You (1953) - Paul
- A Love Story (1954) - von Gagern, Regiments-Adjutant
- The Crazy Clinic (1954) - Evelyns Begleiter
- Die Sonne von St. Moritz (1954) - Paul Genzmer
- Sauerbruch – Das war mein Leben (1954) - Kommissar
- Fireworks (1954) - Gärtner Robert Busch
- Don't Worry About Your Mother-in-Law (1954) - Martin Hoffmann
- The Last Summer (1954) - Der Leutnant (uncredited)
- The Eternal Waltz (1954) - Gregor Alexevitch
- Music, Music and Only Music (1955) - Maurice
- Children, Mother, and the General (1955) - Gefreiter mit der Holzhand
- Stopover in Orly (1955) - Jim
- Three Men in the Snow (1955) - Dr. Fritz Hagedorn
- Heaven Is Never Booked Up (1955) - Franz
- My Children and I (1955) - Günther Hartmann
- A Girl Without Boundaries (1955) - Georg Hartmann
- Urlaub auf Ehrenwort (1956) - Lt. Walter Prätorius
- Charley's Aunt (1956) - Ralf Dernburg
- Before Sundown (1956) - Egbert Clausen
- Black Forest Melody (1956) - Hans Homann
- Kleines Zelt und große Liebe (1956) - Peter Brahm
- Was die Schwalbe sang (1956) - Gerhard Meyen
- Das Donkosakenlied (1956) - Rolf Bender
- Die Christel von der Post (1956) - Mecky Doppler
- Die verpfuschte Hochzeitsnacht (1957) - Peter Mayer
- Kindermädchen für Papa gesucht (1957) - Peter Jäger
- Seamen (1957) - Hannes Romberg
- Es wird alles wieder gut (1957) - Manager Peter Link
- The Legs of Dolores (1957) - Dr. Hans Lorenz
- Night Nurse Ingeborg (1958) - Dr. Manfred Burger
- Petersburger Nächte (1958) - Viktor Kardoff
- Majestät auf Abwegen (1958) - Jochen Brinkmann
- Scala - total verrückt (1958) - Bob
- What a Woman Dreams of in Springtime (1959) - Fritz Bergstadt
- Tunis Top Secret (1959) - Mr. George
- Mandolins and Moonlight (1959)
- A Summer You Will Never Forget (1959) - Ernst Leuchtenthal
- Glück und Liebe in Monaco (1959) - Claus Hohberg, Reporter
- Do Not Send Your Wife to Italy (1960) - Robert Kiel
- Willy the Private Detective (1960) - Dr. Werner Meyer
- Schön ist die Liebe am Königssee (1961) - Ronald Twiss (voice, uncredited)
- What Is Father Doing in Italy? (1961) - Matthias Daniel
- Am Sonntag will mein Süsser mit mir segeln gehn (1961) - Paul, der Geschiedene
- Isola Bella (1961) - Hubert Bergmann
- When the Music Plays at Wörthersee (1962) - Hans Breuer
- The Post Has Gone (1962) - Harry Eberhardt
- Übermut im Salzkammergut (1963) - Rolf Simser
- ...denn die Musik und die Liebe in Tirol (1963) - Fred
- The World Revolves Around You (1964) - Peter Winters, Reporter
- Hotel of Dead Guests (1965) - Morton Marlowe
- Kommissar X – Drei gelbe Katzen (1966) - Baker (voice, uncredited)
- Mister Dynamit - Morgen küßt euch der Tod (1967) - Bardo Baretti (voice, uncredited)
- Unter den Dächern von St. Pauli (1970) - Dr. Pasucha (voice, uncredited)
- Tiger Gang (1971) - Supt. Ali (voice, uncredited)
- Aguirre, the Wrath of God (1972) - Brother Gaspar de Carvajal (voice, uncredited)
- Schwarzwaldfahrt aus Liebeskummer (1974) - Bernhard Klingenberg
- Auch ich war nur ein mittelmäßiger Schüler (1974) - Wolfgang Ahrens
- Derrick (1979-1982, TV Series) - Arnold Soske / Harald Linder / Answald Hohner / Dr. Homann
