= Heinrich Neal =

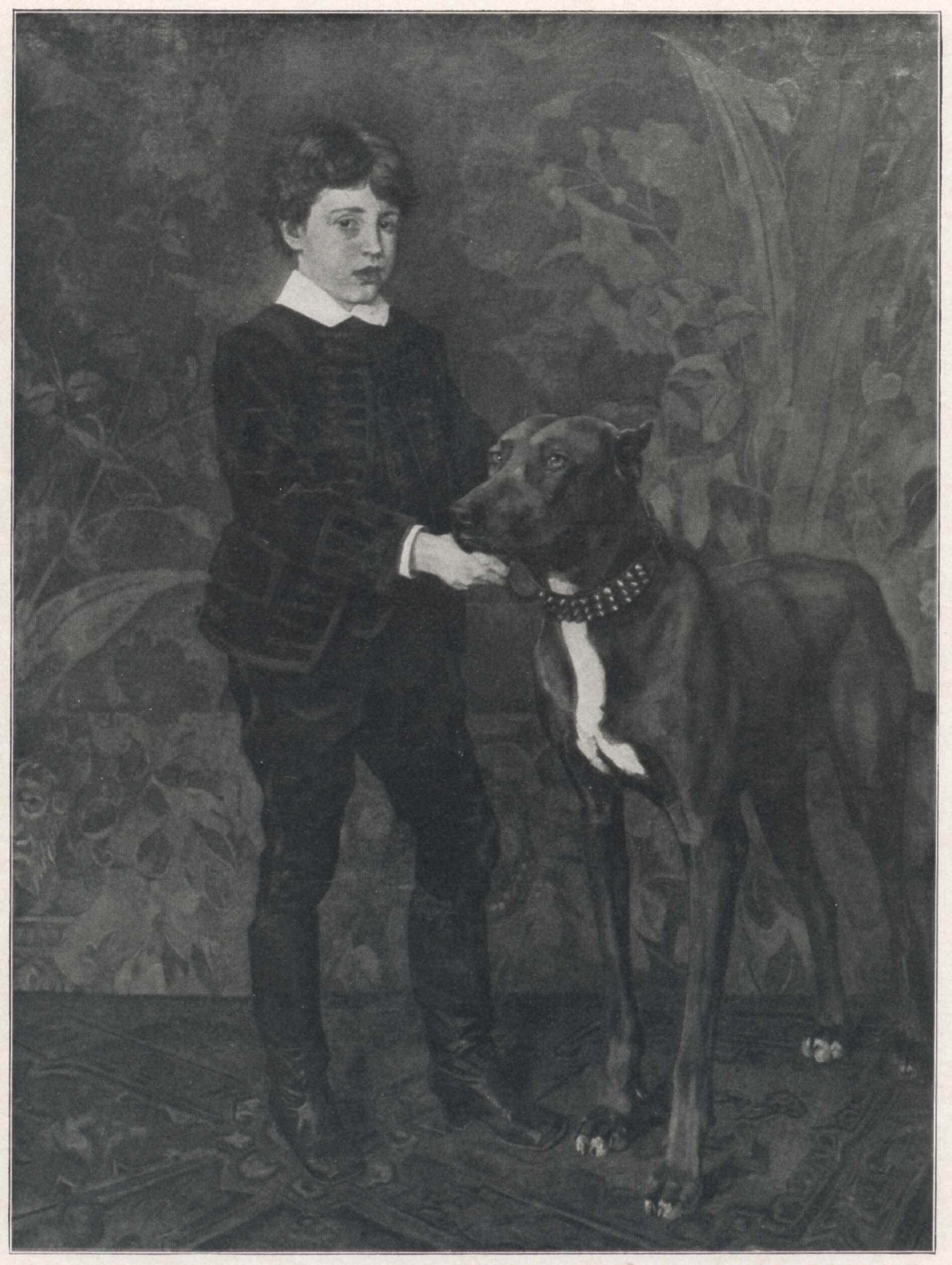
Knabenporträt mit Dogge, portrait of Heinrich Neal by Wilhelm Trübner, 1878

Heinrich Neal (September 11, 1870 – 1940) was a German Kapellmeister at Heidelberg, born to the artist David Dalhoff Neal and Marie Ainmiller, and brother to dramatist Maximilian Dalhoff Neal. His grandfather was the great glass painter Max Emanuel Ainmiller.

Heinrich graduated from the Munich Conservatory in 1888, then studied orchestral instrumentation at Dresden from 1889 to 1890, and in Paris from 1891 to 1893. He, just as his father did, had dual citizenship in Germany as well as the U.S. He married Alice Lessel on March 28, 1896, in Dresden, Germany.

Heinrich was the musical composer, who directed the Heidelberg Conservatory of Music, with his home address of Werder Strasse 7, Heidelberg, Germany.

His music includes many concert works and chamber music notably:

- "Opium" (a grad ballet)
- "Sergeant Crespo" (a comic opera)
- Hast du die Lippen mir wundgeküßt, op. 21 (Fünf Lieder) no. 5 (Text: Heinrich Heine)
- Ich stand in dunkeln Träumen, op. 21 (Fünf Lieder) no. 4 (Text: Heinrich Heine)
- Mir träumte von einem Königskind, op. 21 (Fünf Lieder) no. 3 (Text: Heinrich Heine)
- String Quartet no.1, op. 54 in E♭ major
- Bach: Inventions No. 1, 6 and 8, transcriptions for 2 pianos

Heinrich died a few months before his brother Max Neal died in the early years of the World War II.
