= Margitta Scherr =

German actress

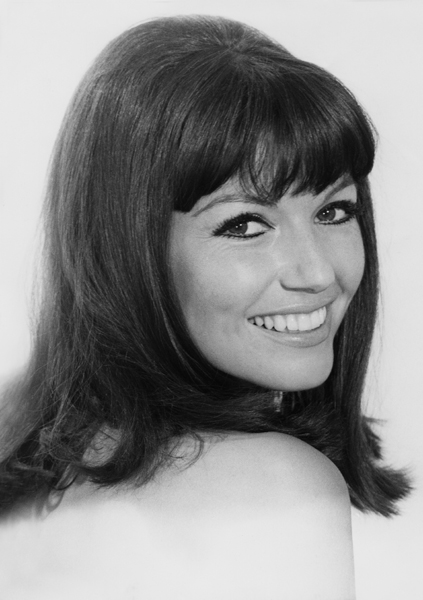
- Scherr in 1967
- Born: 15 August 1943; Chemnitz, Germany
- Died: 30 December 2020 (aged 77); Munich, Germany
- Occupation: Actress
- Years active: 1956–1972 (film & TV)

Margitta Scherr (15 August 1943 – 30 December 2020) was a German film and television actress.

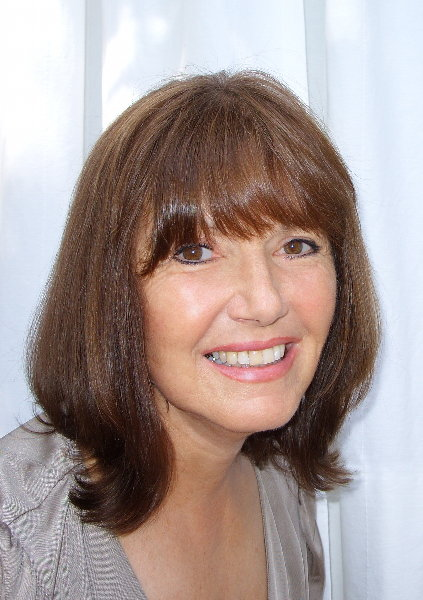
Scherr in 2008

== Selected filmography ==
- Father, Mother and Nine Children (1958)
- Hunting Party (1959)
- Of Course, the Motorists (1959)
- The Sweet Life of Count Bobby (1962)
- When the Music Plays at Wörthersee (1962)
- Holiday in St. Tropez (1964)
- The Merry Wives of Tyrol (1964)
- Our Man in Jamaica (1965)
- Come to the Blue Adriatic (1966)
- The Sinful Village (1966)
- Salto Mortale (1969–1972, TV series)

== Bibliography ==
- Claudio Honsal. Peter Alexander "Das Leben ist lebenswert": die Biographie. Amalthea, 2006.
