= Hotel of Dead Guests =

1965 film

- Directed by: Eberhard Itzenplitz
- Written by: Heather Gardiner (novel); José María Alonso Pesquera; Adolfo Aznar; Joaquín Luis Romero Marchent
- Produced by: Karl Heinz Busse
- Starring: Joachim Fuchsberger; Karin Dor; Frank Latimore; Elke Sommer
- Cinematography: Manuel Hernández Sanjuán; Dieter Wedekind
- Edited by: Elisabeth Kleinert-Neumann
- Music by: Gert Wilden
- Production companies: C.I.C.E. Carthago Films
- Distributed by: Ceres-Filmverleih
- Release date: 26 March 1965
- Running time: 96 minutes
- Countries: West Germany; Spain
- Language: German

Hotel of Dead Guests (German: Hotel der toten Gäste) is a 1965 West German mystery thriller film directed by Eberhard Itzenplitz and starring Joachim Fuchsberger, Karin Dor, Frank Latimore, Wolfgang Kieling and Elke Sommer. The film was shot at the Bavaria Studios in Munich. The film's sets were designed by the art director Walter Blokesch.

== Synopsis ==
The police are called to a hotel, filled with visitors in town for the Sanremo Music Festival, where one of the guests has been murdered.

== Cast ==
- Joachim Fuchsberger as Barney Blair
- Karin Dor as Gilly Powell
- Frank Latimore as Larry Cornell
- Hans Nielsen as Inspector Forbesa
- Renate Ewert as Lucy Balmore
- Gisela Uhlen as Ruth Cornell
- Claus Biederstaedt as Morton Marlowe
- Monika Peitsch as Agnes Green
- Ady Berber as Teddy
- Enrique Guitart as J.J. Frank
- Manuel Collado as Barutti
- Wolfgang Kieling as Jack Courtney
- Gus Backus as Bucci
- Panos Papadopulos as Janos Kovacs
- Elke Sommer as herself (singing: Ich sage "no")
- Hannelore Auer as herself (singing: In Athen gibt es ein Wiedersehn)

== Bibliography ==
- Goble, Alan. The Complete Index to Literary Sources in Film. Walter de Gruyter, 1999.
