= Sensational Janine =

1976 pornographic film by Hans Billian

- Directed by: Hans Billian
- Written by: Hans Billian
- Based on: Josephine Mutzenbacher
- Produced by: Gunter Otto
- Starring: Patricia Rhomberg
- Cinematography: Gunter Otto
- Music by: Dave Apfelbaum
- Distributed by: Herzog Filme
- Release date: 1976
- Running time: 94 minutes
- Country: West Germany
- Language: German

Sensational Janine (German: Josefine Mutzenbacher... wie sie wirklich war - 1. Teil ['Josefine Mutzenbacher... as she really was - Part 1']) is a 1976 West German hardcore costume drama-sex comedy film directed by Hans Billian. The film is an adaptation of the anonymous early 20th century novel Josephine Mutzenbacher on the sexual awakening of the eponymous and fictional fin-de-siècle Viennese courtesan.

== Background ==
Sensational Janine was released in 1979 in the United States and features director Hans Billian's girlfriend Patricia Rhomberg in the lead role. Sensational Janine became the first pornographic film to feature a humorous Viennese German, which contributed significantly to its popularity among the German-speaking audience.

== Synopsis ==
According to the 1982 book Adult Movies by Kent Smith, the film is based on the story of a turn-of-the-century woman, Josephine Mutzenbacher, "who became a famous London madam. The movie chronicles her life, from her first experience with eroticism to her eventual obsession with selling her body, and finally to the setting up of her own brothel."

== Legacy ==
American pornographic film director and critic Jim Holliday has described this film as his "all time foreign favorite" adult film. According to The Film Journal, Sensational Janine was "one of the most successful foreign x-rated films ever to cross the Atlantic". The website TV-Kult says the film is "now considered one of the best porn films of all time". The website Pornoklassiker called it "possibly the best German pornographic film."
