= Ingeborg Hoffmann =

German actress (1921–1985)

Ingeborg Hoffmann (July 1, 1921 – March 27, 1985) was a German actress, known for being the (first) wife of the writer Michael Ende.

== Life and career ==
Hoffmann was born in Munich. She started her career on stage in her youth and performed at theatres in Salzburg and Bremen during pre-war times. In 1940 she had her first character portrayal in Joe Stöckel's The Sinful Village. During World War II Ingeborg Hoffmann participated in plays which were part of the Truppenbetreuung (Engl.: troop welfare) and married an army doctor in 1942. One year later she gave birth to her only son, Michael. After her marriage had failed, she returned to Munich and picked up her career in theatres and kabaretts again. Other engagements led her to Stuttgart and Zürich. Furthermore, she worked as a dubbing actor for the channel Radio München. In 1950 she starred in Paul Verhoeven's Heart of Stone.

In 1952 she met Michael Ende, with whom she was in a relationship for the rest of her life. Hoffmann linked Ende to the booming Kabarett scene of Munich, for which he wrote sketches, e.g. for a theatre group called Die Kleinen Fische (English: The Small Fishes). They were married in 1960 and moved to Italy. Her influence on Michael Ende's artistic work and his children's and young people's classics, that are famous worldwide, is said to be immense. She died in Rome of a pulmonary embolism, only a few days after she had seen The NeverEnding Story in 1985.

== Audio books ==
- 1953: Carl Zuckmayer: Ulla Winblad oder Musik und Leben des Carl Michael Bellmann (English: Ulla Winblad or the music and life of Carl Michael Bellmann) - directed by Walter Ohm
