= David Dalhoff Neal =

American painter

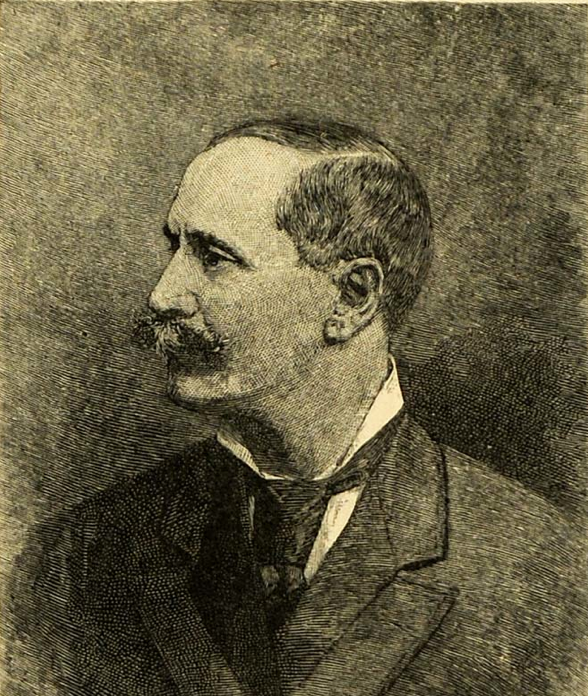
David Dalhoff Neal, age 49, engraving by fellow German artist Gustav Kruell, 1887

David Dalhoff Neal (October 20, 1838 – May 2, 1915), was an American artist.

== Early years ==
David Dalhoff Neal was born to father Stephen Bryant Neal and mother Mary (Dalhoff) Neal, on Middlesex Street, in Lowell, Massachusetts. His grandparents were Stephen Neal, and David Dalhoff and Sally (Bean) Dalhoff of Canterbury, New Hampshire, Dolhoffs that emigrated from Russia in 1763, for whom he was named. His mother's family, the Beans, migrated from the Netherlands in the early 1830s. His aunt Elizabeth Dolhoff was very artistic, and his uncle Jesse Dolhoff was a great singer.

He attended Lowell grammar schools, and high school at Lawrence, Massachusetts. Deciding to devote himself to the study of art, he then attended art classes at the recently opened Andover Academy in Andover, New Hampshire. When Neal was 14, his father died and his fortunes were "impaired", so he set sail for New Orleans. Here at the age of 15, he worked the docks as a wharf clerk with a wood shipping firm dealing in Brazilian and Honduran mahogany. After a year, he earned enough money to make his way to San Francisco, via the Isthmus of Panama.

== San Francisco (1857–1861) ==
In 1857, at the age of 19, Neal settled in San Francisco. He was hired as a draughtsman on wood by a friendly wood-engraver, who took an interest in him, and taught him the art. Soon after, he became the city's best ink drawer upon blocks used by engravers. In fact, his sketching ability was so good that he was hired, from time to time, by the police for likenesses of criminals for the Rogue's Gallery. The first exhibit of his work was at the San Francisco Mechanics' Institute in 1857, and his second was at the 1859 California State Fair. After two years he earned enough money to return to New England for a short while to take art classes at the Andover Academy, but returned to San Francisco when his money ran out. Once back, Neal quickly established himself as one of the city's best portrait artists. He painted portraits of Rev. Mark Hopkins, millionaire Ogden Mills, Judge Hoffman, and Mayor Adolph Sutro, to name a few. While living in California, Neal became friends with Bret Harte and Charles Christian Nahl, with whom he learned many of his early painting techniques.

In an interview with art critic Wilfrid Meynell, Neal recalls the conversation, which brought him to Munich:

A wealthy individual happened upon David as he was painting, and after a moment he simply asked; "When do you intend to go to Europe?"

David replied; "As soon as I have the means."
"How much have you?"
"Eight hundred dollars."
"Well, my wife and I are going to New York by the next steamer. You had better go along."

So, with that, and after four years in San Francisco, 1861 he was off to Munich to attend the Royal Academy.

== Royal Academy years (1862–1868) ==
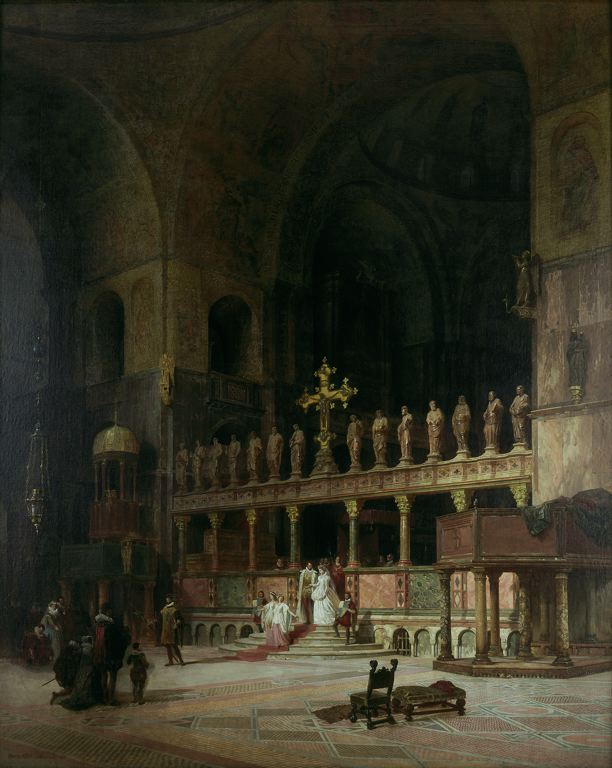
Interior of St. Mark's, Venice, first exhibited, 1869

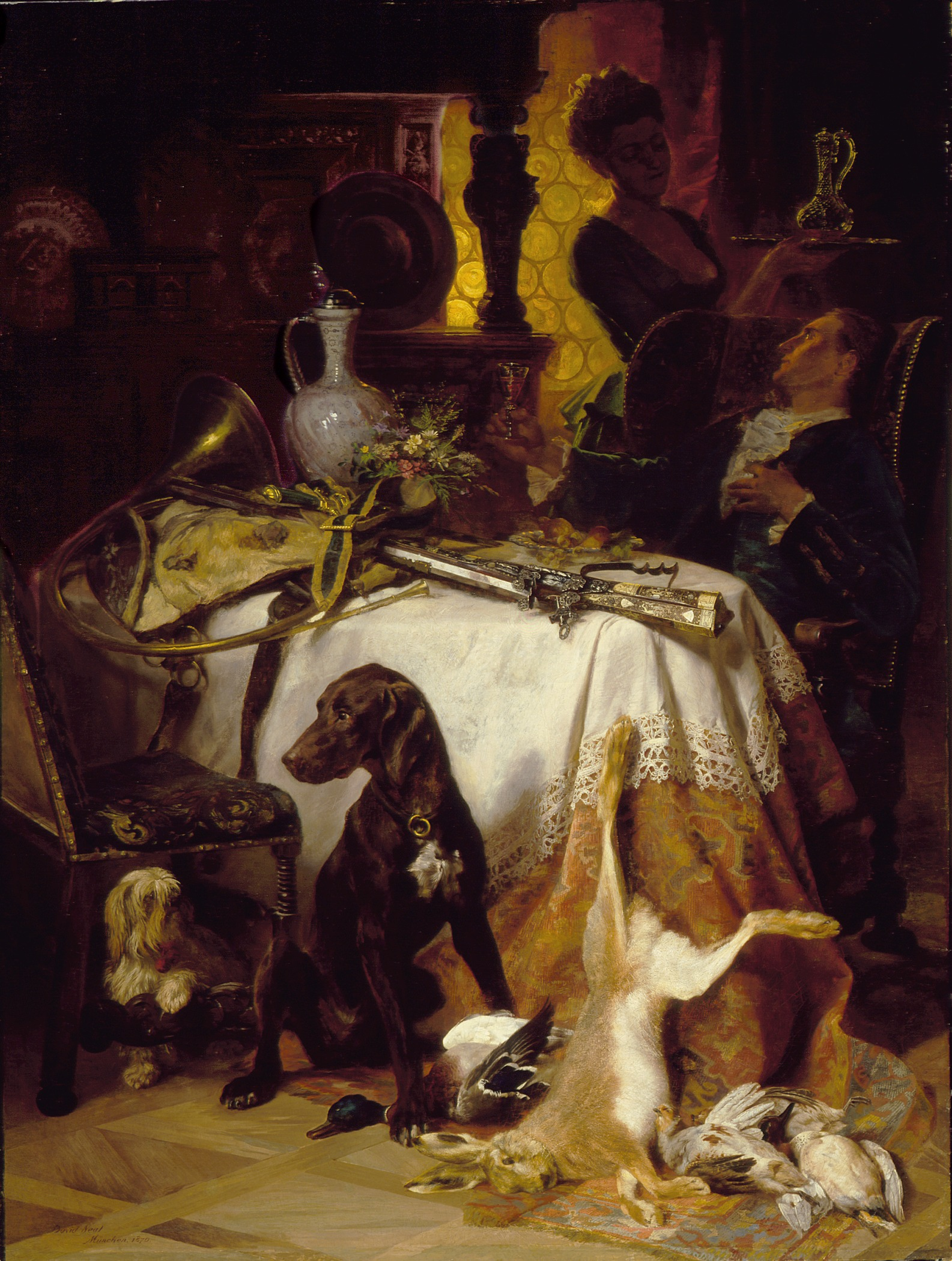
After the Hunt (1870)

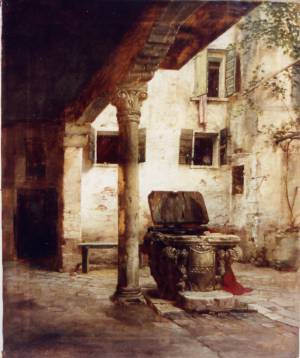
The Courtyard of Titian's House in Venice, displayed at the Whistler House Museum of Art

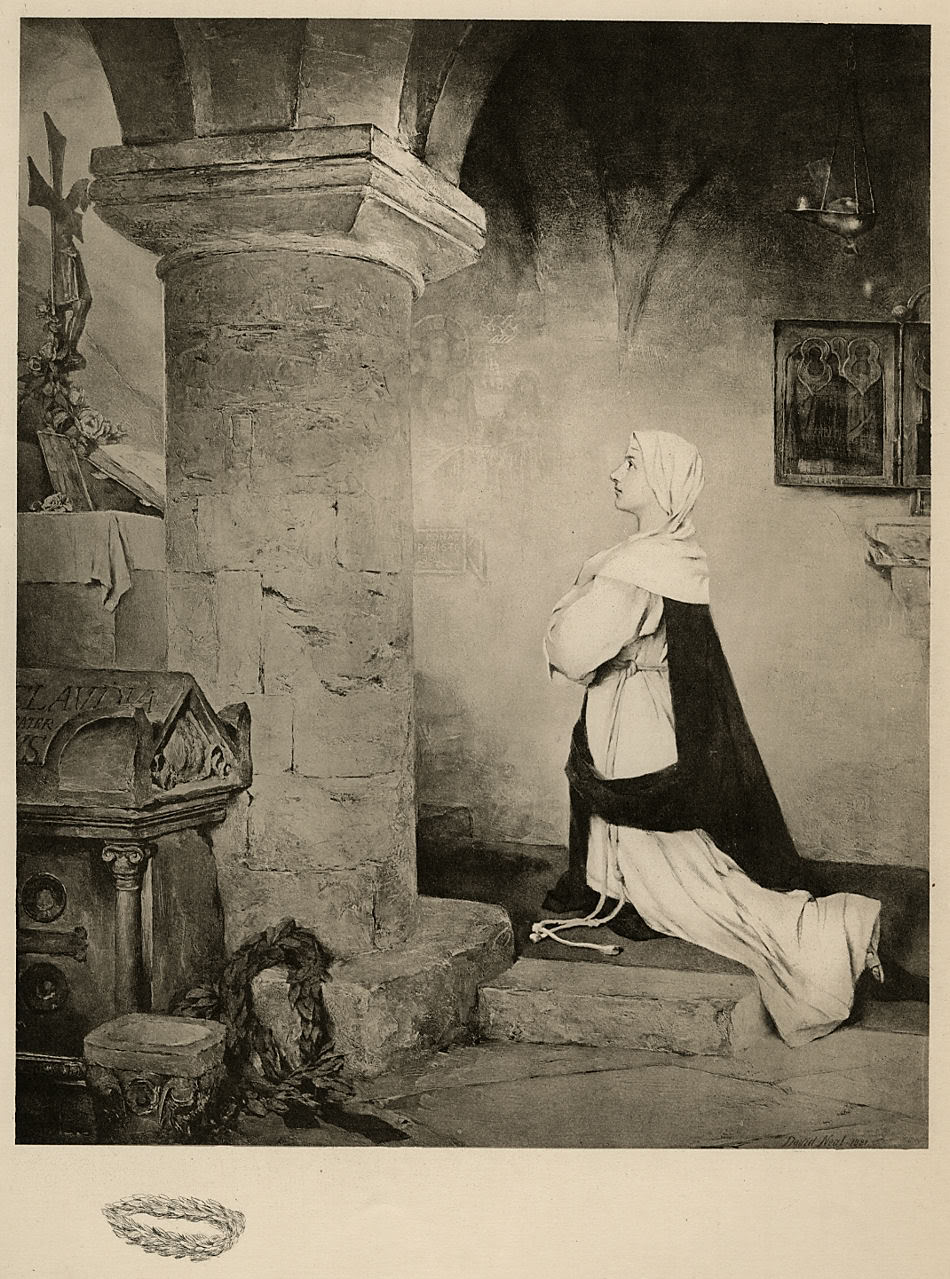
Consolation, published in 1893 by Haskell Publishing Company in Boston

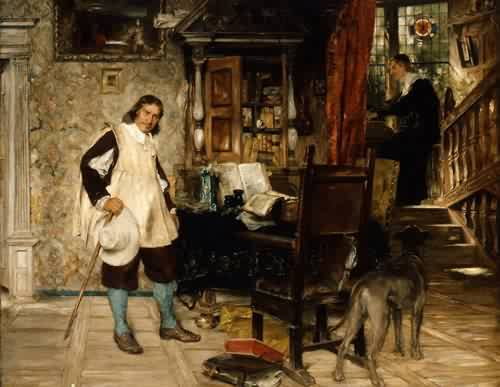
Oliver Cromwell Visits Mr. John Milton (1883)

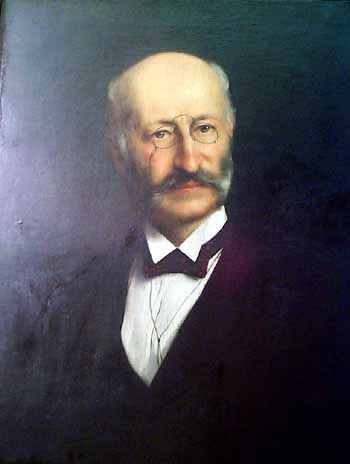
Portrait of Otto Sutro (1889)

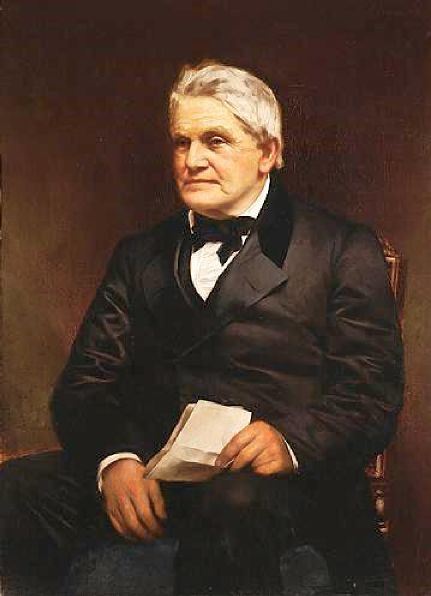
James Savage (1886)

Neal arrived in Hamburg on New Year's Eve, 1862. Now, 24 years old, he became a pupil of the Royal Academy, Munich, under Kaulbach where he concentrated on the art of drawing, and then painting and the art of architectural perspective under famous glass artist Max Emanuel Ainmiller, whose daughter he subsequently married soon after he entered the academy, despite the "... difficulties and objections that took on the realistic guise of romance". Marie Ainmiller and David Neal were married December 9, 1862. They had a son, Maximilian Dalhoff Neal, on March 26, 1865, named after Marie's father, and who would later become a great German dramatist. Under the direction of his father-in-law, David first travelled to Italy, where he painted the interior of St Mark's Basilica, Venice, and then to England, where he painted the interior of Westminster Abbey. Neal was confronted with major opposition in Westminster, being denied twice. It took a letter from Arthur Penrhyn Stanley, Dean of Westminster, before he gained permission to paint, with which he was able to come and go as he pleased through the dean's private doors. After all, it was his father-in-law that had done a lot of the glass work in the abbey.

== Piloty studio years (1869–1876) ==
In 1869 he entered the studio of Alexander Wagner, then Karl von Piloty. Under Piloty, Neal's first painting was a portrait of James Watt, which was exhibited at the Royal Academy in London where it was purchased by the Lord Mayor of London, Sir Benjamin S. Phillips. Just a few months later, Neal's mentor and father-in-law Max died on David and Marie's eighth wedding anniversary. Around the same time, Marie gave birth to their second son, Heinrich Neal, who later would become Kapellmeister at Heidelberg. Around the same time Neal painted Retour de Chasse (1870) which later became known as After the Chase, an oil-on-canvas still life that became one of his first great successes. In 1873 Neal had an exhibition back in California at the San Francisco Art Academy. He later painted The First Meeting of Mary Stuart and Rizzio, which won him the great medal of the Royal Bavarian Academy of Art, the first awarded to an American. He stayed at the studio till 1876.

== First major U.S. tour (1877–1878) ==
In 1877, Neal made a year-long whirlwind trip to the United States, bouncing from city to city, traveling and painting as he went. In a personal letter dated February 2, 1878 he writes back to a childhood friend and art collector, on Middlesex Street in Lowell, Massachusetts, addressed to Mrs. F. Cutting, that describes his hectic work schedule as an artist:

"I have four engagements here to meet, and two in New York, before I can engage to paint any more. I left three unpainted in Chicago, which I had half promised to do. ...I must positively be in Munich by the 1st of May as I have an appointment there with a gentleman who desires to purchase my next large historical picture. I am at present painting Mr. & Mrs. Talbot and shall visit Boston for a day or so and will have the pleasure of talking over the matter of your portrait with you."

Neal did not make it back to Munich till November, and not before his wife met him in Paris, where he later wrote:

"Mrs. Neal met me in Paris. Had it not been for the exhibition nothing could have kept me from hurrying home by the first train, such was my longing to see my babies. My arrival there was the occasion of a great festival on the part of the children, who had the rooms you know so well handsomely decorated. They all seemed at first to be at least a head taller, but after a week they managed to get back to their old proportions. Thirteen months are a great deal upon a child's head."

== 1879-1897 ==
Neal, his wife and sons stayed in Munich, but he traveled extensively to sell and exhibit his works, as he maintained his U.S. citizenship, and divided his time between the two countries with his address of Auen Strasse 74 & later Frauen Strasse 7, in Munich, Bavaria, as well as staying in Albert Bierstadt's house at 1111 Carnegie Hall, New York City. He was a member of the National Academy of Design in New York, as well as the Boston Art Club, 1886, and the Mark Hopkins Institute of Art. In the publication, Modern Art and Artists, in 1888, art critic Wilfrid Meynell comments on Neal's works. Neal continued to paint portraits when in the States, including the daughters of Ogden Mills, Beatrice Mills, and Gladys Mills Phipps.

== Second major U.S. tour (1897–1900) ==
Just after 35 years of marriage, his wife died on September 29, 1897. A few months later, Neal decided to return to the United States for a full two-year painting and exhibition tour. His trip started with a little scare, as the passenger ship Pretoria out of Hamburg had engine failure, and Neal along with the rest of the passengers drifted about the Atlantic, turning their fifteen-day voyage into thirty-five days. Once back in the States, Neal quickly got to work, traveling and setting up studios in Washington, Cleveland, New York, and so on, including his second exhibition at the San Francisco Art Academy in 1898. On June 18, 1899, The New York Times ran a full-page article describing David Neal's works with two paintings printed, Portrait of Mille N. and Nuns at Prayer.

== Later years ==
His son Max Neal began his career as an author and playwright, with works such as The Collie and the Cat and Der Hochtourist (co-author). When the play The Collie and the Cat was to be given at the Irving Place Theatre in New York, David had written to the editor of The New York Times on December 6, 1904 for clarification, and published as "to the Editor of the New York Times":

"In receipt of a clipping from your valuable paper, in which it is stated that "Max Neal... is said to be an American from Hoboken," allow me to say in correction that my son, Max Neal, though coming from pure New England stock, was born in Munich, and has never been in America."

Just as World War I was beginning, Neal and his family were trapped on the German side. He died on May 2, 1915, at the age of 76, as the Allies' blockade choked the life out of the city of Munich. All in all, Neal painted some seventy portraits.

== Famous works ==
- The Chapel of the Nonberg Convent, Salzburg 1864
- On the Grand Canal, Venice, 1869
- Interior of St. Mark's, Venice 1869 displayed at the Art Institute of Chicago
- After the Hunt 1870 (Interior- hunting dog with kills) displayed at the Los Angeles County Museum of Art
- The Burgomaster 1873
- The daydreamer 1873 (interior- child in thought)
- James Watt 1874 (a large historical composition shown at the Royal Academy)
- The First Meeting of Mary Stuart and Rizzio, 1876
- Portraits of Mr. & Mrs. Talbot, 1878
- Oliver Cromwell of Ely Visits Mr. John Milton, 1883 (interior, oil on canvas) displayed at the Boston Museum of Fine Arts) acquired through the Emily L. Ainsley Fund, 1978
- Nuns at Prayer, 1884, displayed at the Royal Gallery of Stuttgart
- Portrait of a Gentleman, 1886
- Portrait of Severn Teackle Wallis, 1887 (displayed in Courtroom 400, Clarence M. Mitchell Jr. Courthouse, Baltimore, MD).
- Portrait of Otto Sutro, 1889
- In the Crypt
- The Courtyard of Titian's House in Venice, displayed at the Whistler House Museum of Art in his home town of Lowell
- Portrait of actress Marie Gorden
- Portrait of the Countress Leschenfeld-Kofering
- Portrait of Mr. Saraoaw a Scandinavian merchant.
- Chapel of the Kings at Westminster (collection of F. Cutting, Boston)
- Portrait of Henry William Green, 1901 Princeton Collection
- Junge Frau mit Rosenbl, 1912 (female portrait)
- A token of Love, 1912 (female portrait)
- Boy with Violin
- John Brown in Prison
- Portraits of the three New Jersey signers of the Declaration of Independence (known last works) commissioned by the Daughters of the American Revolution.
