= Holiday in St. Tropez =

1964 film

- Directed by: Ernst Hofbauer
- Written by: Hans Billian; Max Rottmann
- Starring: Vivi Bach; Ann Smyrner; Rudolf Prack
- Cinematography: Dieter Wedekind
- Edited by: Elisabeth Kleinert-Neumann
- Music by: Gert Wilden
- Production company: Music House
- Distributed by: Constantin Film
- Release date: 14 August 1964
- Running time: 96 minutes
- Country: West Germany
- Language: German

Holiday in St. Tropez is a 1964 West German comedy film directed by Ernst Hofbauer and starring Vivi Bach, Ann Smyrner, and Rudolf Prack.

== Plot ==
Carlos Fonti and his wife Marisa are in the midst of constructing their hotel, St. Tropez, on the Adriatic coast when their workforce abruptly quits to seek employment as guest workers in Germany. This leaves the hotel only partially completed just before the start of the season, much to Carlos's dismay, especially since his niece, Vivi Sörensen, is already advertising for guests as a co-owner of the hotel from back home. Vivi rushes to the hotel and attempts to cancel bookings, but her efforts are in vain as a tour group led by Theo Reich is already en route to the Adriatic. Among the eclectic mix of guests are a governess with her six charges, journalist Michaela, Philipp Kussmaul with his two unruly children, and his wife Friedericke, who is bedridden with measles but plans to join later.

Upon arrival, the stranded vacationers are at a loss for what to do, so they decide to set up camp in the hotel garden. Their numbers swell when Carola Engelhard, who had originally planned to vacation with her parents but ran away due to their change of plans, joins them under the guise of a homeless girl named Brigitte. Meanwhile, Carola's friend Heidi Kirschmann, hoping to snag a wealthy suitor, arrives in a luxurious convertible. As the guests settle in, relationships form and entangle: Vivi connects with Ricky, Michaela with Tommy, and Carola's antics draw the attention of her parents, who ultimately spend their vacation days in a tent near the hotel.

Amidst misunderstandings and romantic entanglements, the vacationers find resolution and joy. Carola reconciles with her parents, Heidi finds companionship with Theo Reich, and Vivi and Ricky become engaged. Eventually, all the guests depart, leaving behind a tale of unexpected connections and newfound happiness.

== Cast ==
- Vivi Bach as Vivi Sörensen
- Ann Smyrner as Heidi Kirschmann
- Rudolf Prack as Robert Engelhard
- Margitta Scherr as Carola Engelhard
- Mady Rahl as Liane Engelhard
- Gerd Vespermann as Theo Reich
- Hannelore Auer as Michaela
- Thomas Alder as Ricky
- Alice Treff as Gouvernante
- Gus Backus as Tommy
- Kurt Großkurth as Carlos Fonti
- Elma Karlowa as Marisa Fonti
- Peter W. Staub as Philipp Kussmaul
- Edith Hancke as Friedericke Kussmaul
- Florian Kuehne as Rups
- Angelika Bender as Rita Kussmaul
- Enzi Fuchs as Fräulein Gerber
- Mario del Marius as Wirt
- Boris Buzančić as Julio
- Billy Mo as Sänger
- Peggy March as Sängerin
- Teddy Parker as Sänger
- Manfred Schnelldorfer as Sänger

== Bibliography ==
- Hobsch, Manfred (1998). Liebe, Tanz und 1000 Schlagerfilme: ein illustriertes Lexikon – mit allen Kinohits des deutschen Schlagerfilms von 1930 bis heute (in German). Berlin: Schwarzkopf & Schwarzkopf. ISBN 978-3-89602-166-3.
