= Gerd Vespermann =

German actor (1926–2000)

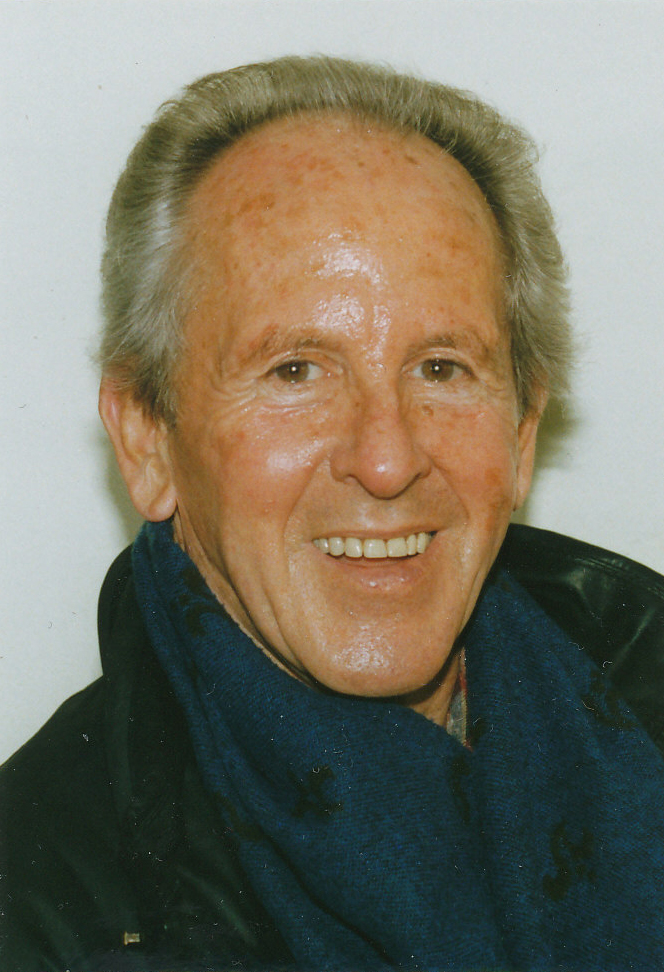
- Vespermann circa 1990
- Born: 24 July 1926; Berlin, Germany
- Died: 25 November 2000 (aged 74); Munich, Germany
- Occupation: Actor
- Years active: 1953–1997 (film & TV)

Gerd Vespermann (24 July 1926 – 25 November 2000) was a German stage, film, television, and voice actor. He was the son of the actors Kurt Vespermann and Lia Eibenschütz. He was also the German voice of Bugs Bunny in Mein Name ist Hase (The German adaptation of The Bugs Bunny Show)

He was married to the actress Hannelore Elsner from 1964 to 1966.

== Filmography ==
Year	Title	Role	Notes
1953	The Empress of China		
1954	Consul Strotthoff		
1954	Guitars of Love		
1954	Bon Voyage		
1955	The Devil's General	Theaterregisseur Rösler	Uncredited
1955	Heroism after Hours	Julius Dingelmann	(segment "Romeo und Julia auf dem Tandem")
1955	Drei Mädels vom Rhein		
1956	Teenage Wolfpack	Willi	Voice, Uncredited
1958	Wenn die Conny mit dem Peter	Rechli	
1960	Man on a String	Oswald	Uncredited
1960	Headquarters State Secret	Captain Burns	
1960	A Woman for Life	Bodo Teufelstein	Uncredited
1961	Town Without Pity		
1961	The Big Show	Prosecutor	
1961	Question 7		
1962	Life Begins at Eight	Gerber, Garderobier	
1963	...denn die Musik und die Liebe in Tirol	Paul	
1964	Holiday in St. Tropez	Theo Reich	
1964	Massacre at Marble City	Tim Fletcher	Voice, Uncredited
1966	Maigret and His Greatest Case	Inspektor Caselle	
1967	The Great Happiness	Teddy Helgers	
1968	Morning's at Seven	Roberts	
1968	Zum Teufel mit der Penne (part 2)	Stohler	
1970	The Last Escape	Blucher	
1972	Cabaret	Bobby	
1982	Dance of the Cookoos	Petrus	German version, Voice, Uncredited
1983	Non-Stop Trouble with Spies	Restaurant-Chef	

== Bibliography ==
- Bock, Hans-Michael & Bergfelder, Tim, eds. (1 September 2009). The Concise Cinegraph: Encyclopaedia of German Cinema. Berghahn Books. ISBN 978-0-8574-5565-9.
