= When the Music Plays at Wörthersee =

1962 film

- Directed by: Hans Grimm
- Written by: Max Rottmann; Lothar Gündisch; Wolfgang Felsing
- Produced by: Karl Heinz Busse; Johannes J. Frank
- Starring: Vivi Bach; Claus Biederstaedt; Grethe Weiser
- Cinematography: Dieter Wedekind
- Edited by: Lisbeth Neumann
- Music by: Gert Wilden
- Production company: Music House Film
- Distributed by: Constantin Film
- Release date: 17 July 1962
- Running time: 91 minutes
- Country: West Germany
- Language: German

When the Music Plays at Wörthersee (German: Wenn die Musik spielt am Wörthersee) is a 1962 West German musical comedy film directed by Hans Grimm and starring Vivi Bach, Claus Biederstaedt and Grethe Weiser. It was shot at the Bavaria Studios in Munich and on location around Velden am Wörther See. The film's sets were designed by the art director Wolf Englert.

== Cast ==
- Vivi Bach as Evelyn Bender
- Claus Biederstaedt as Musikstudent Hans Breuer
- Grethe Weiser as Internatsleiterin Frau von Grafenstein
- Hubert von Meyerinck as Axel Bender, Evelyns Vater
- Margitta Scherr as Gerti Leitner
- Kurt Großkurth as Chauffeur Adalbert
- Johanna König as Musikpädagogin Frl. Fingerl
- Lolita as Magd Theres
- Axel Bauer as Hausdiener Franz
- Heini Göbel as Fredericus Popp
- Cathrin Heyer as Andrea
- Ingrid Simon as Lilo
- Silvia Simon as Hannelore
- Frauke Sinjenas Dagmar
- Eddi Arent as Eddy Kummer
- Peggy Brown as Peggy Brown
- Monica Frank as Monica Frank
- Ted Herold as Ted Herold
- Teddy Parker as Teddy Parker
- The Nilsen-Brothers as Die Nilsen-Brothers
- Gerhard Wendland as Gerhard Wendland
- Red Hot Brass Band as Musikband Gerd Mai Sextett

== Bibliography ==
- Bock, Hans-Michael & Bergfelder, Tim. The Concise CineGraph. Encyclopedia of German Cinema. Berghahn Books, 2009.
- Hobsch, Manfred. Liebe, Tanz und 1000 Schlagerfilme. Schwarzkopf & Schwarzkopf, 1998.
