= The Sinful Village (1940 film) =

1940 film

- Directed by: Joe Stöckel
- Written by: Joseph Dalman; Max Neal (play)
- Starring: Joe Stöckel; Elise Aulinger; Georg Bauer
- Cinematography: Sepp Allgeier
- Edited by: Hertha von Hösslin
- Music by: Toni Thoms
- Production company: Bavaria Film
- Distributed by: Bavaria Film
- Release date: 17 September 1940
- Running time: 91 minutes
- Country: Germany
- Language: German

The Sinful Village (German: Das sündige Dorf) is a 1940 German comedy film directed by Joe Stöckel and starring Stöckel, Elise Aulinger and Georg Bauer. It is based on the play Das sündige Dorf by Max Neal. A remake was produced in 1954 with Stöckel reprising his role. Another version was released in 1966.

It was made at the Bavaria Studios in Munich and on location in Samerberg. The film's sets were designed by the art directors Rudolf Pfenninger and Ludwig Reiber.

== Cast ==
- Joe Stöckel as Thomas Stangassinger
- Elise Aulinger as Frau Stangassinger
- Georg Bauer as Sepp Stangassinger
- Albert Janschek as Toni Stangassinger
- Josef Eichheim as Korbinian Bachmaier
- Hansi Knoteck as Vevi
- Wastl Witt as Vogelhuber
- Erna Fentsch as Afra Vogelhuber
- Beppo Brem as Wegscheidbauer
- Bertl Schultes as Sonnhofer
- Ludwig Schmid-Wildy as Bürgermeister
- Julius Frey as Fastwirt
- Adolf Gondrell as Lawyer
- Margarete Haagen as Hökerin
- Maria Stadler as Kuni
- Ingeborg Hoffmann as Leni
- Emmy Sourmann as Sonnhoferin
- Hans Schulz as Gemeindediener
- Vera Complojer as Barbara Veit
- Erich Teibler as Hirtenjunge

== Bibliography ==
- Alexandra Ludewig. Screening Nostalgia: 100 Years of German Heimat Film. 2014.
