= ...denn die Musik und die Liebe in Tirol =

1963 film

- Directed by: Werner Jacobs
- Written by: Max Rottmann
- Produced by: Karl Heinz Busse; Johannes J. Frank
- Starring: Vivi Bach; Claus Biederstaedt; Hannelore Auer; Gunther Philipp
- Cinematography: Dieter Wedekind
- Edited by: Elisabeth Kleinert-Neumann
- Music by: Gert Wilden
- Release date: 20 December 1963
- Country: West Germany
- Language: German

...denn die Musik und die Liebe in Tirol is a 1963 West German musical comedy film directed by Werner Jacobs and starring Vivi Bach, Claus Biederstaedt and Hannelore Auer.

== Cast ==
- Vivi Bach - Susanne Berger
- Claus Biederstaedt - Fred
- Hannelore Auer ... Monika
- Gunther Philipp ... Herbert Petunius - Unterhaltungsboß vom Fernsehen
- Corny Collins - Heidi
- Trude Herr - Rehlein
- Hubert von Meyerinck - Oskar Ortshaus
- Gus Backus - Peter
- Franz Muxeneder - Krummblick
- Hugo Lindinger - Narbe
- Gerd Vespermann - Paul
- Inge Kuntschnigg - Renate
- Aliha Krause - Gertie
- Marie France - Yvonne
- Elke Sommer
- Peppino Di Capri
