= The Sinful Village (1954 film) =

1954 film

- Directed by: Ferdinand Dörfler
- Written by: Max Neal (play); Joe Stöckel; Joseph Dalman
- Produced by: Ferdinand Dörfler
- Starring: Joe Stöckel; Günther Lüders; Renate Mannhardt
- Cinematography: Heinz-Günter Görisch; Bruno Mondi
- Edited by: Jutta Hering; Hildegard Neumann
- Music by: Emil Ferstl
- Production company: Dörfler-Filmproduktion
- Distributed by: Deutsche Film Hansa
- Release date: 10 September 1954
- Running time: 93 minutes
- Country: West Germany
- Language: German

The Sinful Village (German: Das sündige Dorf) is a 1954 West German comedy film directed by Ferdinand Dörfler and starring Joe Stöckel, Günther Lüders and Renate Mannhardt. It was based on the play Das sündige Dorf by Max Neal. It is a remake of the 1940 film of the same title.

It was shot at the Bavaria Studios in Munich. The film's sets were designed by the art director Wolf Englert and Max Mellin.

== Main cast ==
- Joe Stöckel as Thomas Stangassinger
- Günther Lüders as Christian Süßbier
- Renate Mannhardt as Afra
- Hanna Hutten as Vevi
- Elise Aulinger as Therese Stangassinger
- Beppo Brem as Wegscheidbauer
- Walter Reyer as Sepp Stangassinger
- Albert Rueprecht as Toni Stangassinger
- Wastl Witt as Mathias Vogelhuber

== See also ==
- The Sinful Village (1940)
- The Sinful Village (1966)

== Bibliography ==
- Alexandra Ludewig. Screening Nostalgia: 100 Years of German Heimat Film. 2014.
