= Manfred Schnelldorfer =

German figure skater

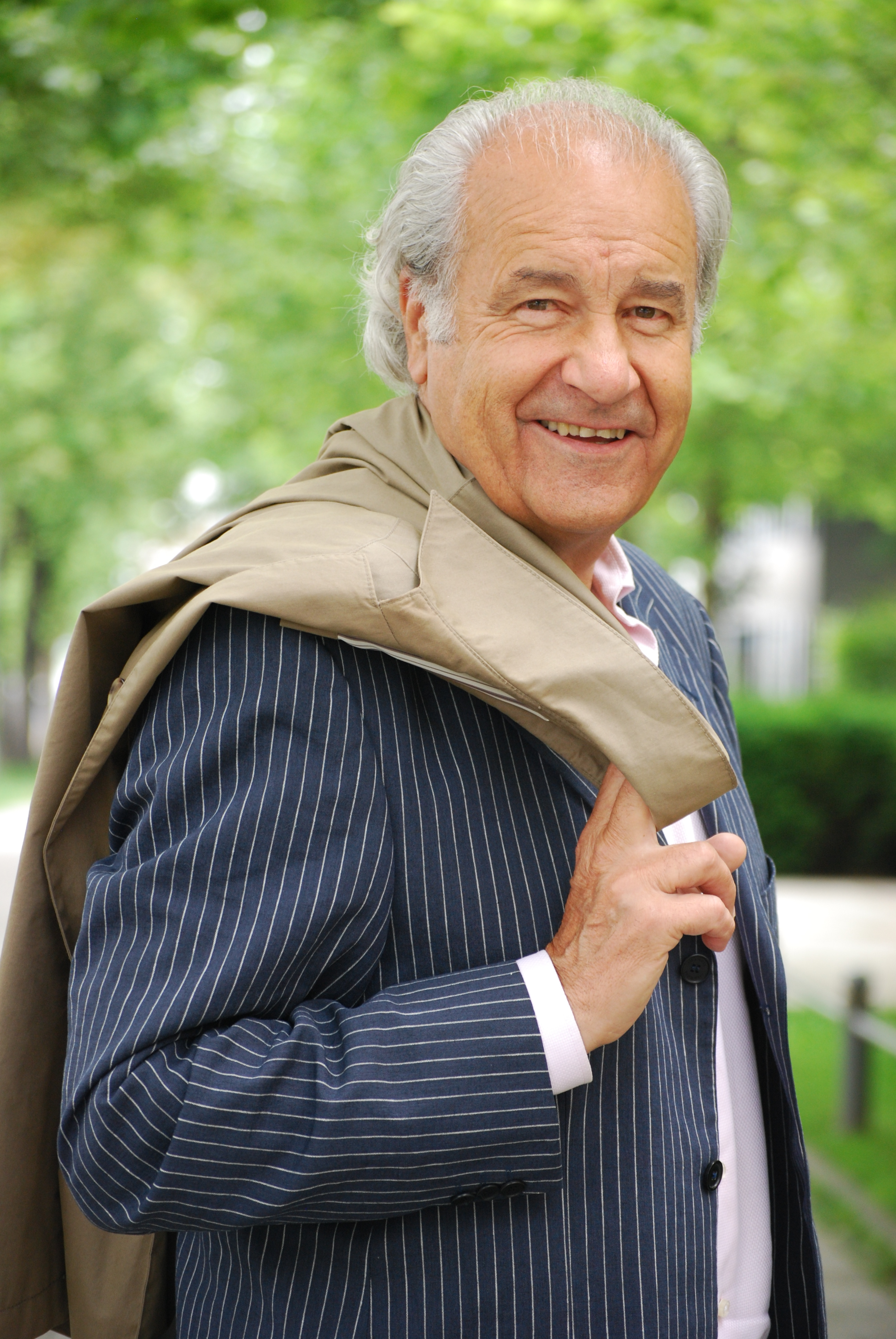
- Manfred Schnelldorfer (2011)

Personal information
- Born: 2 May 1943 (age 83) Munich, Bavaria

Figure skating career
- Country: Germany
- Skating club: Munich ERC
- Retired: 1964
Medal record
Men's figure skating
Representing Germany
Olympic Games
Gold medal – first place	1964 Innsbruck	Singles
Representing West Germany
World Championships
Gold medal – first place	1964 Dortmund	Singles
Bronze medal – third place	1963 Cortina d'Ampezzo	Singles
European Championships
Silver medal – second place	1964 Grenoble	Singles
Silver medal – second place	1963 Budapest	Singles
Bronze medal – third place	1962 Geneva	Singles
Bronze medal – third place	1961 Berlin	Singles
Bronze medal – third place	1960 Garmisch-Partenkirchen	Singles

Manfred Schnelldorfer (born 2 May 1943) is a German former figure skater. He is the 1964 Olympic champion, the 1964 World champion, and an eight-time German national champion.

== Personal life ==
Manfred Schnelldorfer was born on 2 May 1943 in Munich, Bavaria, the son of two figure skating coaches. His father had skated in an ice revue but saw its milieu as a harmful influence.

Manfred Schnelldorfer studied architecture at TH-München but put his studies on hold for financial reasons. A resident of Munich, he is married and has two children.

== Career ==
=== Competitive ===
Schnelldorfer won his first competition at age eight. He was coached by his parents and skated for the Munich ERC club. Internationally, he represented the Federal Republic of Germany (West Germany).

Schnelldorfer finished second behind Hans-Jürgen Bäumler at the German Junior Championships. The following year, he won the German senior title while Bäumler finished fourth.

At age 20, he won the gold medal at the 1964 Winter Olympics in Innsbruck, became one of the youngest male figure skating Olympic champions. His victory was a surprise. The favorite was Alain Calmat of France, who won the Europeans between 1962 and 1964 and was silver medalist at the 1963 Worlds.

In all, Schnelldorfer was an eight-time German champion, one-time World champion (1964), three-time bronze and two-time silver medalist at the Europeans.

=== Post-competitive ===
After his Olympic win, the Ice Capades offered Schnelldorfer a $1.5 million three-year contract but he declined because of a promise to his parents. For two years beginning in 1967, he served as the sports director, officially "national coach", of the Deutsche Eislauf Union. After his parents gave their approval, he performed with the Deutsche Eistheater from 1969 to 1973.

Schnelldorfer was also a pop singer (German: Schlagersänger) and actor before becoming a coach and sport teacher. He was the first West German national coach for figure skating between 1974 and 1981.

Schnelldorfer owns some sport shops.

=== Songs ===
- Wenn du mal allein bist (When you are once alone)
- Deine schönen blauen Augen (Your beautiful blue eyes)
- Mizzie

=== Films ===
- Holiday in St. Tropez (1964)
- Ich kauf' mir lieber einen Tirolerhut (1965) (I prefer to buy a Tiroler hat)
- Tausend Takte Übermut (1965) (Thousand takts high spirits)
- Spukschloß im Salzkammergut (1966)
- Komm mit zur blauen Adria (1966) (Come to the Blue Adriatic)

== Competitive highlights ==
International
Event	1954	1955	1956	1957	1958	1959	1960	1961	1962	1963	1964
Olympics							8th				1st
Worlds			WD	11th	15th		7th		5th	3rd	1st
Europeans		10th	10th	7th	7th	5th	3rd	3rd	3rd	2nd	2nd
National
German	1st J	2nd	1st	1st	1st	1st	1st	1st		1st	1st
J: Junior level; WD: Withdrew
