= Vivi Bach =

Danish actress (1939–2013)

- Born: Vivi Bak; 3 September 1939; Copenhagen, Denmark
- Died: 22 April 2013 (aged 73); Ibiza, Spain
- Occupations: Actress, model
- Years active: 1958–1974
- Spouse: Dietmar Schönherr (m. 1965)

Vivi Bach (3 September 1939 – 22 April 2013) was a Danish film actress. She appeared in 48 films between 1958 and 1974. Bach was born as Vivi Bak in Copenhagen, Denmark, and died on Ibiza, Spain, where she lived with her husband, the Austrian film actor Dietmar Schönherr.

== Selected filmography ==
- Krudt og klunker (1958)
- Pigen og vandpytten (1958)
- Soldaterkammerater rykker ud (1959)
- We Will Never Part (1960)
- Guitars Sound Softly Through the Night (1960)
- Crime Tango (1960)
- Our Crazy Aunts (1961)
- The Adventures of Count Bobby (1961)
- The Sold Grandfather (1962)
- The Post Has Gone (1962)
- When the Music Plays at Wörthersee (1962)
- Death Drums Along the River (1963)
- Our Crazy Nieces (1963)
- Bullets Don't Argue (1964)
- Holiday in St. Tropez (1964)
- Mozambique (1965)
- Love Italian Style (1965)
- Come to the Blue Adriatic (1966)
- The Spy with Ten Faces (1966)
- Per un pugno di canzoni (1966)
- The Pipes (1966)
- Ski Fever (1966)
- Electra One (1967)
- Love Thy Neighbour (1967)
- Glorious Times at the Spessart Inn (1967)
- Onkel Joakims hemmelighed (1967)
- Assignment K (1967)
- Ein Tag ist schöner als der andere (1969)
