= The Sinful Village (1966 film) =

1966 film directed by Werner Jacobs

- Directed by: Werner Jacobs
- Written by: Joseph Dalman; Max Neal (play); Joe Stöckel (1940 screenplay)
- Starring: Michl Lang; Marianne Lindner; Gunther Philipp
- Cinematography: Gerhard Krüger
- Music by: Mladen Franko
- Production company: Music House Film
- Distributed by: Nora-Filmverleih
- Release date: 25 August 1966
- Running time: 95 minutes
- Country: West Germany
- Language: German

The Sinful Village (German: Das sündige Dorf) is a 1966 West German comedy film directed by Werner Jacobs and starring Michl Lang, Marianne Lindner and Gunther Philipp. It was based on the play Das sündige Dorf by Max Neal which had previously been made into a 1940 film of the same title.

== Cast ==
- Michl Lang as Thomas Stangassinger
- Marianne Lindner as Therese Stangassinger
- Gunther Philipp as Korbinian
- Thomas Alder as Sepp Stangassinger
- Hannelore Auer as Afra
- Hans-Jürgen Bäumler as Herbert Stangassianger
- Beppo Brem as Vogelhuber
- Peggy March as Sängerin
- Franz Muxeneder as Wegscheidbauer
- Margitta Scherr as Vevi
- Ruth Stephan as Barbara Veit
- Manfred Streibert as Boeller-Birtel
- Hubert von Meyerinck as Anwalt

== See also ==
- The Sinful Village (1940)
- The Sinful Village (1954)

== Bibliography ==
- Goble, Alan. The Complete Index to Literary Sources in Film. Walter de Gruyter, 1999.
