= Patricia Rhomberg =

Austrian pornographic film actress

- Years active: 1975–1979

Patricia Rhomberg is an Austrian pornographic film actress who starred in the 1976 West German pornographic film Sensational Janine.

== Josephine Mutzenbacher ==
Rhomberg starred in a 1976 pornographic film based on the life of Viennese prostitute Josephine Mutzenbacher, titled Josefine Mutzenbacher wie sie wirklich war, 1. Teil ['Josefine Mutzenbacher as she really was, Part 1'] (released in the United States in 1979 as Sensational Janine). This film brought her fame in Germany. It inspired numerous sequels, but the original is the only one in which Rhomberg appears.
