= Max Neal =

German playwright (1865–1941)

Maximilian Dalhoff Neal (26 March 1865 – 1 January 1941) was a German playwright, born to the artist David Dalhoff Neal and wife Marie Ainmiller, and later brother to composer Heinrich Neal. His maternal grandfather was the great glass painter Max Emanuel Ainmiller.

== Biography ==
Max Neal's first trip to the U.S. was in 1904, to have his play "The Collie and the Cat", performed at the famous German Theatre, Irving Place Theatre in New York City. When the play was advertised in The New York Times, Max Neals's father David, had written to the editor of The New York Times on 6 December 1904 for clarification, and published as "to the Editor of the New York Times": "In receipt of a clipping from your valuable paper, in which it is stated that 'Max Neal... is said to be an American from Hoboken,' allow me to say in correction that my son, Max Neal, though coming from pure New England stock, was born in Munich, and has never been in America."

Neal teamed up with friend Max Ferner to write the libretto for two operettas for Austrian Composer Karl Michael Ziehrer which were performed in September 1913 and then again in February 1916.

Neal's first silver screen movie was a silent, black & white film called Das Geheimnis der grünen Villa that debuted in 1922, of which he was the sole writer, and was directed by Philipp Lother Mayring.

According to a 24 June 1922 article in The New York Times titled "Woods Back with 40 Foreign Plays", producers Albert H. Woods and Charles B. Dillingham traveled to Europe to collect plays to re-produce in the States, of which Parquette No. 6 by Max Neal and Hans Gerbeck were one. Woods also described Germany as "... the livest country in the world theatrically at the present time, France is busy and England is the deadest."

Just as his father had died at the onset of World War I, Max Neal died, also in Munich, Germany, and also at the age of 76 in the onset of World War II on 1 January 1941, less than two months after his friend Max Ferner (59) had died.

== Plays ==
- Der müde Theodor (1913, co-author Max Ferner)
- Der heilige Florian (1913, co-author Philipp Weichand)
- Fürst Casimir, operetta by Karl Michael Ziehrer (1913, co-author Max Ferner)
- Im siebenten Himmel, operetta by Karl Michael Ziehrer (1916, co-author Max Ferner)
- Die drei Dorfheiligen (1920, co-author Max Ferner)
- Das sündige Dorf (a.k.a. Der Mann im Fegfeuer, 1925)
- Der Hochtourist (1927, co-author Curt Kraatz)
- Der Hunderter im Westentaschl (1935, co-author Max Ferner)

== Filmography ==
- Der müde Theodor (1918, based on the play Der müde Theodor)
- Trötte Teodor (Sweden, 1931, based on the play Der müde Theodor)
- Der Hochtourist (1931, based on the play Der Hochtourist)
- Service de nuit (France, 1932, based on the play Der müde Theodor)
- Der müde Theodor (1936, based on the play Der müde Theodor)
- Thunder, Lightning and Sunshine (1936, based on the play Der Hunderter im Westentaschl)
- The Sinful Village (1940, based on the play Das sündige Dorf)
- Der scheinheilige Florian (1941, based on the play Der heilige Florian)
- Der Hochtourist (1942, based on the play Der Hochtourist)
- Trötte Teodor (Sweden, 1945, based on the play Der müde Theodor)
- Die drei Dorfheiligen (1949, based on the play Die drei Dorfheiligen)
- The Sinful Village (1954, based on the play Das sündige Dorf)
- Tired Theodore (1957, based on the play Der müde Theodor)
- Der Hochtourist (1961, based on the play Der Hochtourist)
- The Sinful Village (1966, based on the play Das sündige Dorf)

=== Screenwriter ===
- Das Geheimnis der grünen Villa (1922)
- A halott szerelme (1922)
