= Schreiber (surname) =

Schreiber is a German surname meaning "scribe" or "writer"; often compared to English Clark or Clerk. Notable people with the name include:

== Arts & entertainment ==
- Avery Schreiber (1935–2002), American comedian
- Charlotte Schreiber (1834–1922), English-Canadian painter and illustrator
- Dan Schreiber, United Kingdom radio producer
- Liev Schreiber (born 1967), American actor, half-brother of Pablo
- Linda Schreiber, American television soap opera writer
- Pablo Schreiber (born 1978), American actor, half-brother of Liev
- Ryan Schreiber, editor-in-chief of Pitchfork Media
- Terry Schreiber (born 1937), American theater director
- Ulrich Schreiber (born 1951), German director of the International Literature Festival Berlin

== Journalism ==
- Claudia Schreiber (born 1958), German journalist
- Constantin Schreiber (born 1979), German journalist
- Ernie Schreiber, editor of the Lancaster New Era
- Flora Rheta Schreiber (1918–1988), American journalist
- Jean-Jacques Servan-Schreiber or JJSS (1924–2006), French journalist and politician
- Jürgen Schreiber (journalist) (1947–2022), German investigative journalist
- Le Anne Schreiber (1945–2019), American journalist

== Military ==
- Edmond Schreiber (1890–1978), British general of World War II
- Franz Schreiber (1904–1976), Standartenführer in the German Waffen SS
- Gustav Schreiber (1916–1995), Hauptscharführer in the German Waffen SS
- Helmuth Schreiber (1917–2008), Sturmbannführer in the German Waffen-SS
- Josef Schreiber (1919–1945), German soldier in the Wehrmacht during World War II
- Leroy A. Schreiber (1917–1944), American fighter pilot and flying ace during World War II
- Walter Schreiber (1893–1970), German military officer and doctor

== Politics ==
- Cindy Schreiber-Beck (1954–2025), American politician in North Dakota
- Ernie Schreiber (born 1929), German-born Canadian politician
- Eva Schreiber (1958–2023), German politician
- Grzegorz Schreiber (born 1961), Polish politician
- Jannik Schreiber (born 1985), German politician
- Leon Schreiber (born 1988), South African writer and politician
- Łukasz Schreiber (born 1987), Polish politician, son of Grzegorz
- Mark Schreiber, Baron Marlesford (1931–2025), British Conservative politician
- Mark Schreiber (Kansas politician), member of the Kansas House of Representatives
- Martin E. Schreiber (1904–1997), American carpenter, real estate agent and politician, father of Martin J.
- Martin J. Schreiber (born 1939), American politician, publisher, and lobbyist; governor of Wisconsin (1977–1979)
- Patrick Schreiber (born 1979), German politician
- Suzanne Schreiber, member of the Oklahoma House of Representatives
- Walther Schreiber (1884–1958), German politician; mayor of Berlin (1953–1955)

== Religion ==
- Emanuel Schreiber (1852–1932), American rabbi
- Hermann Schreiber (1882–1954) German doctor of philosophy, rabbi and journalist
- Moses Schreiber or Moshe Sofer (1762–1839), European rabbi
- Simon Schreiber (1821–1883), Austrian rabbi

== Science ==
- David Servan-Schreiber (1961–2011), French physician and neuroscientist
- Hieronymus Schreiber (died 1547), German doctor, mathematician and astronomer
- Johann Friedrich Schreiber (1705–1760), German physician and philosopher
- Raemer Schreiber (1910–1998), American physicist
- Robert D. Schreiber (born 1946), American immunologist
- Stuart Schreiber (born 1956), American chemical biologist
- Urs Schreiber (born 1974), German mathematician and theoretical physicist
- William F. Schreiber (1925–2009), American electrical engineer and professor

== Sports ==
=== Baseball ===
- Barney Schreiber (1882–1964), American baseball player
- Doug Schreiber (born 1963), American baseball coach
- Hank Schreiber (1891–1968), American baseball player
- John Schreiber (baseball) (born 1994), American baseball pitcher
- Paul Schreiber (1902–1982), American baseball player
- Ted Schreiber (1938–2022), American baseball player

=== Other ===
- Adam Schreiber (born 1962), American football player
- Andreas Schreiber (born 1987), Swedish basketball player
- Birgit Schreiber, German cross country skier
- Christian Schreiber (born 1980), German rower
- Daniela Schreiber (born 1989), German swimmer
- Edwin Schreiber (1936–2010), South African cricketer
- Elaine Schreiber (1939–2017), Australian table tennis player
- Hartmut Schreiber (born 1944), German rower
- Jens Schreiber (born 1982), German swimmer
- Larry Schreiber (born 1947), American football player
- Marie Schreiber (born 2003), Luxembourgish cyclist
- Olaf Schreiber (born 1969), German footballer
- Peter Schreiber (born 1964), German javelin thrower
- Robin Schreiber (born 1949/1950), American basketball superfan
- Thomas Schreiber (bobsledder), Swiss bobsledder
- Wally Schreiber (born 1962), Canadian hockey player
- Zahra Schreiber (born 1986), American professional wrestler

== Writers ==
- Boris Schreiber (1923–2008), French writer
- Brad Schreiber, American writer
- Ellen Schreiber, American young-adult fiction author
- Jasmin Schreiber (born 1988), German biologist, science journalist, writer, photographer, and translator
- Jan Schreiber (born 1941), American poet
- Joe Schreiber (born 1969), American author
- John Schreiber (writer) (born 1954), American writer and teacher
- Mark Schreiber (writer), American writer

== Other ==
- Benjamin Schreiber (disambiguation), multiple people
- Chaim Schreiber, founder of Schreiber Furniture in the United Kingdom
- Charles Schreiber (1826–1884), English academic, fine arts collector and politician
- Christian Schreiber (philosopher) (1781–1857), German philosopher
- Collingwood Schreiber (1831–1918), English-Canadian surveyor, engineer and civil servant
- Dan Schreiber (poker player) (born 1985), American pro gamer and poker player
- Daniel Schreiber (born 1971), British-Israeli founder of Lemonade, Inc.
- Gaby Schreiber (1904–1976), British industrial and interior designer
- Jürgen Schreiber (businessman) (born 1962), German manager in international retail business
- Karlheinz Schreiber (born 1934), German-born lobbyist, fundraiser, arms dealer, and businessman
- Charlotte Elizabeth Schreiber or Lady Charlotte Guest (1812–1895), English translator and business woman
- Thomas Schreiber (innkeeper) (c. 1598–1629), German innkeeper executed for witchcraft
- Timothy Schreiber, London-based, German-born architect and design artist
- Zvi Schreiber (born 1969), British-Israeli serial entrepreneur
