= John Schreiber =

John Schreiber may refer to:

- John Schreiber (baseball) (born 1994), American baseball pitcher
- John Schreiber (writer) (born 1954), American author, teacher, and theater director

== See also ==
- Schreiber (surname)
