= Mark Schreiber =

Mark Schreiber may refer to:

- Mark Schreiber, Baron Marlesford (1931–2025), British Conservative politician
- Mark Schreiber (Kansas politician), member of the Kansas House of Representatives
- Mark Schreiber (writer) (born 1960), American writer

== See also ==
- Schreiber (surname)
