= List of people with kidney stones =

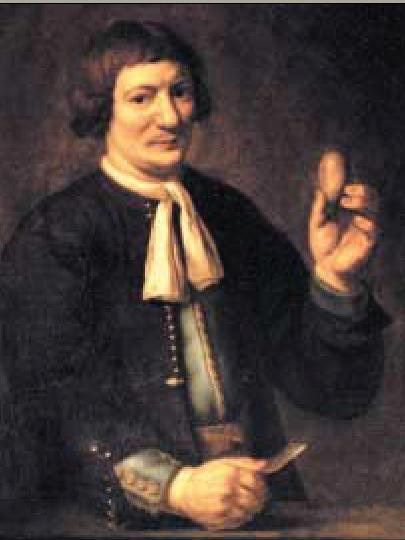
Portrait of Jan de Doot holding the stone he claims to have removed from his body using a knife

There are a number of documented cases of historical figures and distinguished members of society who had kidney stones. This condition is caused by nephrolithiasis, which are more commonly known as kidney stones, or urolithiasis, where the stone forms in the urinary system. These are crystal deposits that can accrete in the urinary system when certain chemical substances become concentrated in the urine. Among the symptoms associated with nephrolithiasis are intense colicky pain, nausea, fever, chills, and the reduction or blockage of urine flow. Historically, the condition of having a kidney or bladder stone was referred to as "the stone" or "the gravel".

In certain cases, kidney stone formation played a pivotal role in history. Most notably, some members of the royalty and military leaders became debilitated at important moments, such as Napoleon III of France during the Franco-Prussian War of 1870 and Athenian commander Nicias in the disastrous Sicilian Expedition of 415-413 BC. Despite this condition, artists such as Arthur Sullivan and Michel de Montaigne managed to produce historically distinguished works; providing an example of perseverance in the face of severe and chronic pain. The medical advances of the twentieth century have allowed patients to survive the condition, whereas in the past it may have proven debilitating or fatal (as shown by the examples below).

Kidney stones can reach exceptional size. In December 2003, a kidney stone weighing 356 g (12.5 oz) was removed from the right kidney of Peter Baulman of Australia. At its widest point, the stone measured 11.86 cm (4.66 in). In 2017, a 2 kg (4.4 lb) stone spanning 20 cm was surgically removed from Abdul Abu Al Hajjar in Kensington, England. As of August 2006, the most kidney stones ever passed naturally was 5,704 by Canadian Donald Winfield. The largest number removed through surgery was 728, during a three-hour operation upon Mangilal Jain of India, on January 27, 2004.

== Actors and media figures ==
- In 1954, movie actress Ava Gardner was hospitalized in Madrid with kidney stones. In her torment, she is said to have yelled curses that caused the Spanish nuns to blush.
- During the shooting of the film Family Plot, Alfred Hitchcock underwent surgery for colitis and a kidney stone. He was also fitted with a pacemaker.
- Hollywood talent agent Lew Wasserman was suffering from a kidney stone during the 1970s. As he was about to embark on an oceanic voyage, he insisted that it be surgically removed despite the risk and the reluctance of his doctor.
- Early in the filming of Live and Let Die (1973), actor Roger Moore was hospitalized from a pre-existing kidney stone condition.
- During the shooting of the City Heat (1984), actor Burt Reynolds became debilitated from a kidney stone, and had to resort to medications to continue filming. He also suffered a broken jaw when struck by a metal chair and displayed inner ear problems.
- Commentator Bill O'Reilly dislikes doctors, and so for two years he avoided medical attention for a kidney stone. It was surgically removed in 2002 and he was back on the air within four hours.
- On October 19, 2005, while working on the set of Boston Legal, actor William Shatner was taken to the emergency room for lower back pain. He eventually passed a kidney stone, but recovered and soon returned to work. Shatner sold his kidney stone in 2006 for $75,000 to GoldenPalace.com. The money went to a housing charity, and a home was built for a family which had lost theirs in Hurricane Katrina.
- While writing his book A Year at the Movies, former Mystery Science Theater 3000 cast member Kevin Murphy (Tom Servo) passed a kidney stone, an experience he documented.
- American comedian Jeff Foxworthy passed five kidney stones, an experience which he has described during his stand-up routine.
- English radio producer Karl Pilkington was diagnosed with kidney stones in late August 2006.
- Other actors and media figures who have suffered through a kidney stone include Tim Burton, Jamie Kennedy, Rob Schneider, Kiefer Sutherland, Michael McIntyre, Mike Vogel and Luis dela Torre.

== Artists and musicians ==
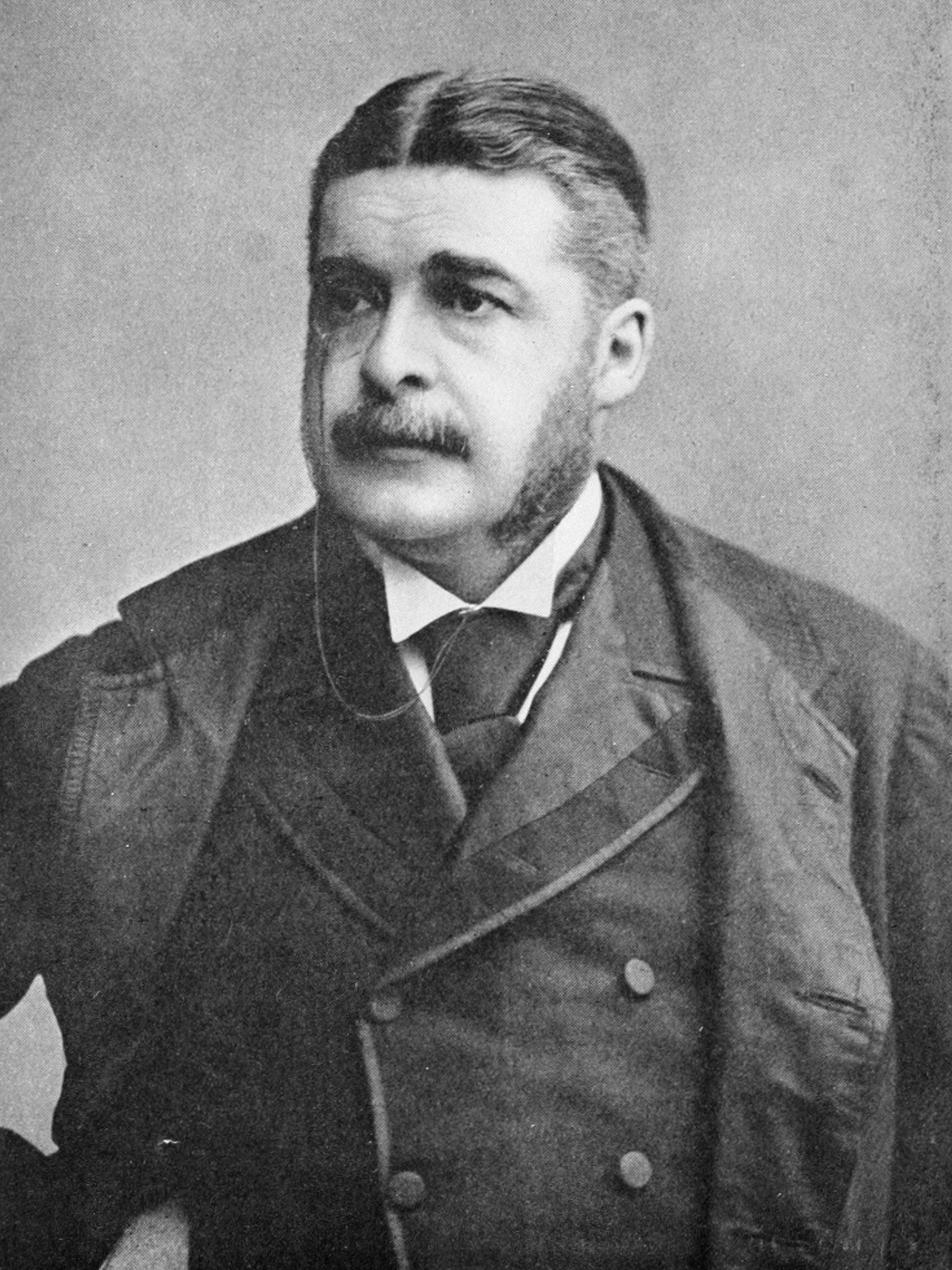
Arthur Sullivan wrote the comic opera H.M.S. Pinafore in between bouts of excruciating pain from his kidney stones.

- In 1549, Italian Renaissance painter Michelangelo was treated for kidney stones by anatomist Realdo Colombo. Michelangelo appears to have suffered for many years from recurrent uric acid stones and may have died from obstructive nephropathy. His condition may account for his artistic interest in kidneys.
- Five years after retiring because of ill health, in 1612 Italian composer Giovanni Gabrieli died from an attack of kidney stones.
- Arthur Sullivan, of the musical partnership Gilbert and Sullivan, began to suffer from kidney stones in 1872. This would affect him for the remainder of his life, although he would continue to write while suffering from pain. He underwent surgery in 1874 in an attempt to treat the condition.
- Crooner Bing Crosby suffered from recurring kidney stones from 1951 onward, according to biographer George Carpozi Jr.
- Among his many medical maladies, in 1964 composer Cole Porter was hospitalized for the removal of kidney stones. He died two days later, most likely bronchopneumonia in his chest. He was also found to have chronic nephrosclerosis, or degeneration of the kidneys.
- Opera singer Birgit Nilsson painfully passed a kidney stone following a concert in Göteborg, Sweden.
- Tony-award winning composer Charles Strouse became infected as a result of a kidney stone. He recovered after treatment with antibiotics and the removal of the stone.
- Chart singer Peter Andre was forced to postpone two shows at Plymouth Pavilions in 2010 because of a kidney stone.
- Other artists and musicians who have suffered from a kidney stone include Nick Drake, Billy Joel, Gene Simmons, and Adam Young.

== Authors ==
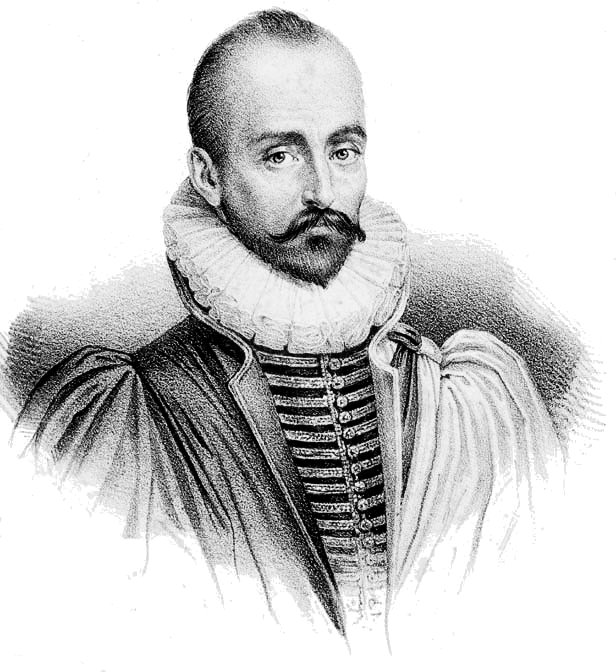
Michel de Montaigne wrote of his condition that, "I am at grips with the worst of all maladies, the most sudden, the most painful, the most mortal and the most irremediable. I have already experienced five or six very long and painful bouts of it."

- The post-mortem examination of noted diarist Samuel Pepys revealed, "a nest of no less than seven stones" in his left kidney. These weighed a total of 4.5 ounces. When he was younger, Pepys had undergone bladder surgery, pre-anesthesia, for removal of a large stone. He carried this stone with him to try to persuade fellow sufferers to endure the painful surgery.
- Michel de Montaigne, the French Renaissance writer who popularized the essay, began to suffer from chronic kidney stones in 1578. His father had died from kidney stones.
- Ciro di Pers, an Italian Baroque poet and man of letters, began to suffer from chronic kidney stones in late life.
- Mary Ann Evans wrote under the male pen name of George Eliot. She had suffered from various health problems for all of her life, and starting in February 1874 she endured a series of kidney stone attacks that lasted until her death.
- While visiting Italy, the author Llewelyn Powys (who lived from 1884 to 1939) began coughing up blood because of his tuberculosis and also suffered from a kidney stone. After he returned home to Dorset, he passed the stone with excruciating pain. He had to take medication for the remainder of his life to avoid forming another stone.
- American author Jack London used morphine to alleviate the pain of kidney stones. He most likely died at the age of forty from kidney failure and possibly a toxic dose of pain reliever.
- At the end of her life in 1980, author Ethel Wilson was hospitalized and suffering from recurrent small strokes. The day before she died, she was in physical distress from passing a kidney stone. A doctor injected her with medication to ease the pain.
- Author Isaac Asimov suffered from kidney stones, and wrote about how his pain was treated with morphine, saying that he feared becoming addicted to morphine if he ever needed it again. During the 1980s, his problem with kidney stones developed into kidney disease, which resulted in multiple hospitalizations.
- In his book A Year at the Movies, Mystery Science Theater 3000 writer and performer Kevin Murphy describes his ordeal with a kidney stone: "Being gut-stabbed with a dirty spoon in a prison cafeteria is less painful."
- Chuck Palahniuk, the author of Fight Club, wrote about his experience with passing a kidney stone in his nonfiction book Stranger Than Fiction: True Stories.
- Washington Post columnist and Pulitzer Prize winner Art Buchwald suffered from a kidney stone late in his life.
- During a book tour, best selling author David Sedaris started passing a kidney stone. He completed several lectures while on pain medication.

== Nobility and royalty ==
- Caesar Augustus, the first emperor of the Roman Empire, suffered from various physical maladies including kidney and bladder stones.
- From at least 1518, Frederick III, Elector of Saxony suffered from gout and kidney stones.
- James I of England suffered from several symptoms characteristic of kidney stones, including abdominal colic and passing red urine. Following his death in 1625, stones were found in his kidney.
- While he was alive, King Louis XIV of France frequently voided kidney stones but without suffering apparent pain. A small stone was found in the left kidney of his corpse.
- In 1722 the Russian ruler Peter the Great began to experience kidney problems. The symptoms grew worse during 1723 and by the following year it was diagnosed as the stone. He suffered from extreme pain in the loins and then tumors began to form on his thighs. Early in 1725 he died.
- Empress Anna of Russia was known to suffer from kidney stones, and in 1740 her condition became more acute. After becoming bedridden, she died later the same year. An autopsy showed that the stones resembled branching coral.
- After his death, British King George IV was found to have a bladder stone that had become encysted. A year before his death he had complained of a pain in his bladder.
- With his health deteriorating, in 1860 Lord Cochrane twice underwent surgery for kidney stones. He died during the second operation.
- King Leopold I of Belgium underwent a lithotrity in 1862 for the removal of a kidney stone. However, the operation was only partly successful and he underwent a second surgery in 1863. For the latter operation, Sir Henry Thompson was appointed surgeon-extraordinary to the King.
- Napoleon I of France became ill with a kidney stone during the Battle of Borodino, September 7, 1812. This condition may help explain his unoriginal tactics during the battle.
- Dom Pedro I of Brazil suffered from frequent kidney stone attacks.
- Napoleon III of France may have lost the Franco-Prussian war of 1870 in part because of a massive kidney stone. He died from kidney stone surgery in 1873.
- Māori Queen Dame Te Atairangikaahu was hospitalized for kidney surgery in 2005, a few weeks after the 40th anniversary of her coronation.

== Politicians and military commanders ==
- In the disastrous Sicilian Expedition (415-413 BC), the Athenian commander Nicias was afflicted with kidney stones during the entire period he was in charge.
- The English military and political leader Oliver Cromwell may have suffered from kidney stones during the 1650s. His doctor said that, "being much troubled with the stone, he used sometimes to swill down several sorts of liquor, and then stir his body by some violent motion ... that by such agitation he might disburden his bladder."
- In 1659, Myles Standish, who served as military officer of the Pilgrims at Plymouth Colony, became "sick of the stone" and died after suffering much "dolorous pain".
- Sir Robert Walpole, generally regarded as the first Prime Minister of Great Britain, suffered from the stone, as did his brother Horace Walpole and his mother Catherine.
- John Hart, a member of the Continental Congress representing New Jersey and signer of the Declaration of Independence, died of kidney stones in 1779 after much suffering.
- British General James Wolfe suffered from "the gravel" prior to the Battle of Quebec during the Seven Years' War.
- Virginia Governor Patrick Henry complained in a letter written in 1799 that he was suffering from "the Gravel" which "rendered it impossible for me to ride out to Day."

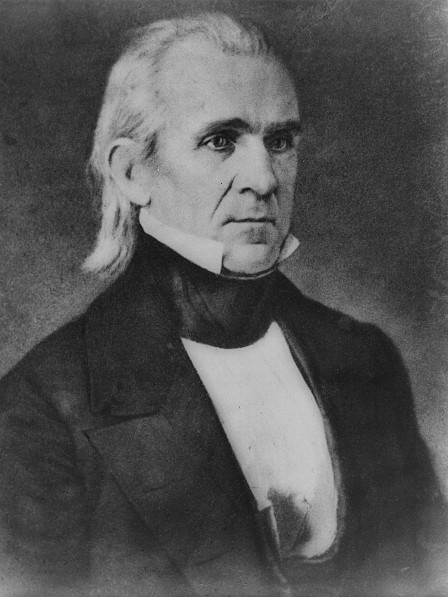
The dangerous and painful surgery used to remove a stone through James K. Polk's perineum may have left him unable to conceive a child.

- The eleventh President of the United States, James K. Polk, suffered from kidney stones during his youth. At the age of seventeen he underwent a successful lithotomy without anaesthetic for removal of a urinary stone. Thereafter he was sufficiently well to be able to receive a formal education.
- Colonel Edward M. House was the foreign policy advisor to President Woodrow Wilson until removed from that post in 1919. In that year he suffered through a painful kidney stone, and he had recurrences in 1928 and 1930.
- In 1959, Indian Prime Minister Indira Gandhi began to suffering from severe pain in the stomach and back. She was diagnosed with a kidney stone and underwent successful surgery in February 1960 to have it removed.
- Sukarno, the first President of Indonesia, suffered from recurrent kidney stones. He was twice forced to seek medical treatment in Vienna; the second time for removal of a kidney stone.
- U.S. President Lyndon B. Johnson suffered from kidney stones at various times in his life. He was reluctant to seek treatment because of the effect it may have on his political image.
- The perjury trial of Deputy White House Chief of Staff Michael Deaver was twice delayed because he was suffering from kidney stones.
- Bosnian Serb military commander Ratko Mladić underwent surgery in Belgrade for a kidney stone in 1995, during the final year of the Serbian conflict with Bosnia. He was later indicted by the UN War Crimes Tribunal for genocide and other crimes.
- Former Speaker of the United States House of Representatives, Dennis Hastert, has had a number of kidney stones, necessitating kidney stone removal surgery. Senator John McCain has had four small kidney stones and he took the diuretic hydrochlorothiazide to prevent their formation. Other congress members who have experienced kidney stones include Representatives Tom Price and Mike Simpson, and Senator Ted Kennedy.
- Former White House Deputy Chief of Staff Karl Rove under U.S. President George W. Bush was hospitalized in September 2005 due to kidney stones.
- Former Deputy Prime Minister of the United Kingdom John Prescott was hospitalized on Christmas Day, 2006 for a kidney stone.
- Senior CIA lawyer John Rizzo had a number of kidney stone attacks, beginning in 1968.
- Other political figures who have had a kidney stone include U.S. Treasury Secretary Timothy Geithner and British Labour politician Peter Mandelson.

== Religious figures ==
- Pope Vigilius, whose papacy began in 537, died in Sicily while suffering from kidney stones, 555.
- Saint Ailred of Rievaulx took frequent baths and consumed wine to alleviate the severe pain from his kidney stones.
- The German monk Martin Luther periodically suffered from kidney stones, and he almost died in 1537 from being unable to urinate. During his lengthy journey home, the jostling motion of the carriage released the stone and so spared his life.
- During his life, the French Protestant John Calvin would suffer from a variety of physical ailments, including kidney stones, arthritis, a bleeding stomach, gout and nephritis.
- Cardinal Mazarin, the successor to Cardinal Richelieu as the French King's Chief Minister, began to suffer from kidney stones in 1659. He died two years later while also suffering from gout and deteriorating health.

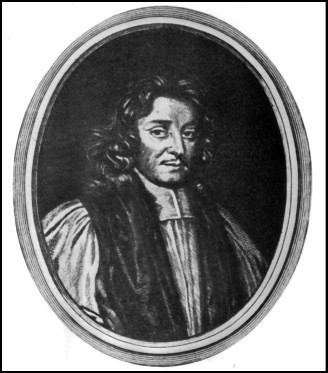
To treat his kidney stones, John Wilkins was fed, "four red-hot oyster shells in a quart of cider and blistering with cantharides."

- After surviving the plague year of 1665, English clergyman, author and chief founder of the Royal Society John Wilkins became ill from kidney stones and he was unable to pass urine. He most likely died from the opiates or other medications that were used to treat his condition.
- Pope Innocent XI survived primitive surgery for the extraction of kidney stones. After his death in 1689, he was found to have a "stone weighing nine ounces in the left kidney and another weighing six ounces in the right side."
- Mary Baker Eddy was the founder of Christian Science, a movement that discouraged its members from seeking help from doctors for their illnesses. In 1903 she began to suffer from extreme pain and consented to a visit by a doctor. After a diagnosis of kidney stones, she agreed to injections of morphine to alleviate the pain.
- In 1954, when Billy Graham was preparing to preach at Berlin's Olympic Stadium, he began to suffer pain from a kidney stone. Wondering whether the Devil might be mounting a vengeful attack against him, he chose to continue the public service without painkillers, rather than appearing groggy or undergoing hospitalization.
- After praying to Mother Teresa, a 1/2-inch-diameter (13 mm) kidney stone disappeared from the lower ureter of Father V. M. Thomas in Guwahati, India. This occurred a day before the priest was scheduled to undergo surgery for the stone's removal. The surgeon said that, "the disappearance of the calculus (stone) was beyond medical explanation." This alleged miracle was used to support the case for sainthood of Mother Teresa.
- In 2010, David Zubik, bishop of the Catholic Diocese of Pittsburgh, was hospitalized with kidney stones.

== Scholars, scientists and philosophers ==
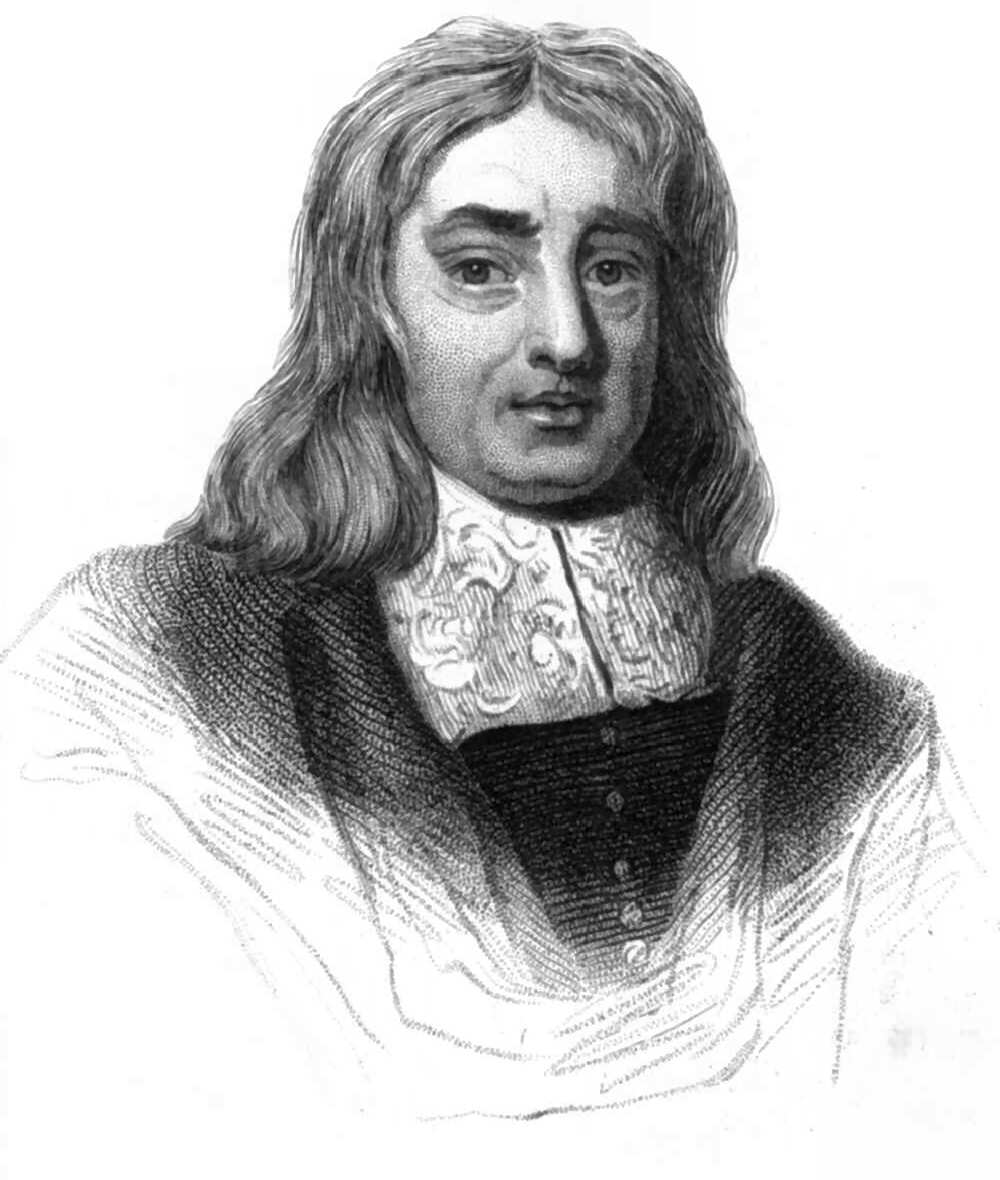
Thomas Sydenham began to suffer from kidney stones at the age of 25.

- In 271 or 270 BC, the Greek Philosopher Epicurus died from a stone blockage of his urinary tract lasting a fortnight, according to his successor Hermarchus and reported by his biographer Diogenes Laërtius.
- The Dutch humanist and theologian Desiderius Erasmus suffered from gout, kidney stone and hypochondria.
- In describing his kidney stones, the physician Thomas Sydenham said, "The pain is like that of a dislocation and yet parts feel as if cold water had been poured over them... Now it is a gnawing pain and now it is a pressure and tightening. So exquisite and lively meanwhile is the feeling of the part affected, that it cannot bear the weight of the bedclothes nor the jar of a person walking in the room."
- Robert Boyle, regarded as the first modern chemist, was troubled for much of his adult life by kidney stones.
- After retiring from the Lumleian lectureship at Cambridge University in 1655, the aging physician William Harvey was known to suffer from gout and kidney stones. He is noted for his correct description of blood and the circulatory system.
- In 1686, Danish anatomist and geologist Nicholas Steno became gravely ill from kidney stones. He suffered great pain and his stomach became distended. Shortly before he died, he prayed that, "My God I beg you not to take the pains from me, but to give me the patience to bear them."
- Georges-Louis Leclerc, Comte de Buffon, French naturalist, suffered from kidney stones in 1771 and their "passing caused him very sharp pains". He had 57 stones at time of autopsy in 1788.
- During Sir Isaac Newton's later life, he was troubled by painful urinary incontinence, probably due to uric acid stones in the bladder.
- The distinguished mathematician and philosopher Gottfried Leibniz died from a combination of gout and the stone. Although he was a member of several distinguished societies, he had fallen into such disfavor that only one man came to his funeral.
- In the final years of his life, Benjamin Franklin is known to have used laudanum, an alcoholic herbal preparation of opium, to alleviate the pain of recurrent kidney stones.
- The eminent Italian anatomist and surgeon Antonio Scarpa suffered severely from a stone for several years. This caused a bladder inflammation which led to his demise in 1832.

== Sports figures ==
- Nearing the end of his life, in 1985 the father of competitive weightlifting, Bob Hoffman, suffered from a number of physical ailments, including kidney stones.
- New York Giants football coach Bill Parcells underwent medical treatment for a kidney stone in 1990. Against his doctor's advice, Bill Parcels attempted to coach the next game against the Minnesota Vikings, but a reporter noted he "appeared drawn and in pain".
- During a 1996 attempt to cross Antarctica, explorer and endurance record holder Sir Ranulph Fiennes was forced to turn back because of kidney stones. He lists it as his most painful experience.
- Los Angeles Lakers head coach Phil Jackson underwent a lithotripsy procedure to treat a kidney stone in 2003. It was the first time he missed a game as coach. He had experienced symptoms for two years prior to the surgery.
- Professional golfer Davis Love III had to withdraw from the 2007 Wyndham Championship to undergo surgery for a kidney stone. Afterward he said that, "Except for feeling like I've been punched in the side, I feel fine."
- Bernhard Langer had to pull out of the 2007 Deutsche Bank Players' Championship to undergo an operation for kidney stone removal.
- Blackpool F.C. boss Ian Holloway was taken to hospital in August 2007 with a kidney stone.
- In June 2003 at the Texas State Skeet Shooting Championships (Waco, Texas), Houston area skeet shooter Michael Fox began experiencing severe discomfort and pain of a kidney stone upon beginning the Doubles event. Somehow, throughout the one hour event he was not only able to complete the 100 target competition, but also maintained his focus by shooting a perfect score - breaking all 100 targets. He finished second out of 174 competitors, losing the tie-breaking shootoff to eventual champion Jason Ward.
- In March 2009, driver Martin Truex Jr. was hospitalized before the Atlanta's Cup race with a kidney stone. Because of the NASCAR drug regulations, he decided to forgo medications while passing the stone so that he could compete in the race.
- During the 2009 National Hockey League playoffs, all-star right winger Mark Recchi underwent surgery to have a kidney stone removed. He said of the pain, "I don't wish it on anybody."
- In December 2011, Marcus Thornton of the Sacramento Kings suffered a kidney stone.
- In November 2017, Vince Carter of the Sacramento Kings suffered a kidney stone
- Winner of the 2003 Grand National, Jockey Barry Geraghty was hospitalized with a kidney stone in 2015. He said, "I was in a lot of pain and had to have plenty of morphine."
- At the age of 50, Olympic gold medalist Caitlyn Jenner (then Bruce) (Note: Jenner changed her name due to gender transition in 2015.) discovered that she had a kidney stone after undergoing a full body EBCT scan.
- During 2016, FC Barcelona forward Lionel Messi apparently played three games with a stone in his kidney. He used tranquillizers during the games, then underwent a lithotripsy to break up the stone.
- Golfer Bubba Watson passed two kidney stones in five years.

=== Baseball ===
- Baseball Hall of Famer Tony Gwynn had a kidney stone removed arthroscopically in 1997.
- New York Mets' relief pitcher Dennis Cook began to suffer from a kidney stone just as his team reached the World Series in 2000. However, he was able to pitch during the first game.
- In 2004, Minnesota Twins catcher Joe Mauer had surgery for kidney stones. A stent was used to allow two stones to successfully pass.
- Chicago White Sox manager Ozzie Guillén was hospitalized while passing a kidney stone in 2004. He said, "that was something I don't wish anybody has, even my worst enemy."
- Rich Aurilia, an infielder for the San Francisco Giants, was rushed to a hospital in 2008 because of a kidney stone. He said, "it felt like somebody stuck a knife in my rib cage".
- Other current or former baseball players who have had kidney stones include Mike Cameron, Derek Bell, Tony Fernández, Bobby Jenks, Whitey Kurowski, Bill Mazeroski, Tom Niedenfuer, Miguel Olivo, Jay Payton, Brian Roberts, Tim Salmon, Joe Saunders, James Shields, Josh Willingham and Robin Yount.

== Others ==
- The Soap Lady, a mysterious mummified female on exhibit at the Mütter Museum, may have suffered from a kidney stone or gallstone.

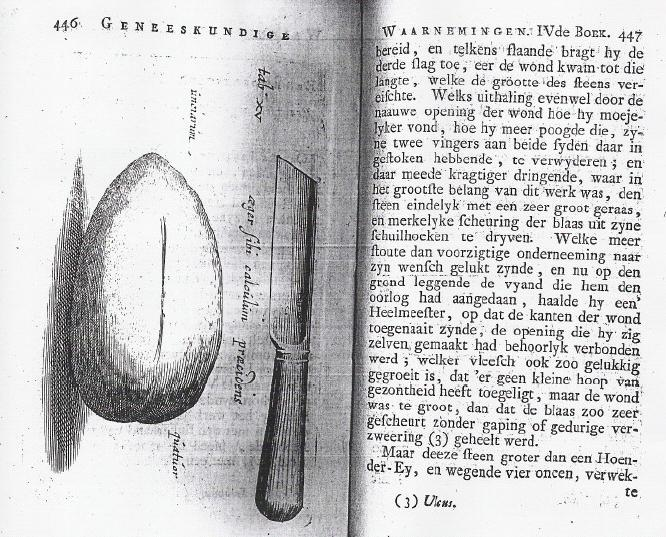
This illustration displays the stone that Jan de Doot claims he removed from his own bladder.

- Dutch blacksmith Jan de Doot is remembered for having his portrait painted with the "four ounce palpable stone" that he supposedly removed from his perineum using a kitchen knife in 1651.
- In 1981, Bart Giamatti, the President of Yale University and future Commissioner of Baseball, had a kidney stone removed.
- Socialite Lydia Hearst-Shaw, granddaughter of William Randolph Hearst, has kidney stones.
- The CIA believes that terrorist Osama bin Laden may have had kidney stones, an enlarged heart, low blood pressure and two missing toes.
- Between 2001 and 2006, 14 American astronauts developed kidney stones during space missions. During long-duration space flights, astronauts are at higher risk for kidney stones because of an increase in the amount of calcium in their blood. This is caused by a loss of bone density in zero gravity.
- In January 2014, Jeff Bezos, the founder and CEO of Amazon.com suffered a kidney stone.
- In March 2015, Benjamin Schreiber, who was serving a life sentence for murder, was hospitalized for severe kidney stones, which required resuscitation. After he recovered, he unsuccessfully filed for post-conviction relief, claiming that his sentence ended as he temporarily died.
- In September 2017, Linux creator Linus Torvalds passed a kidney stone over an interval he described as "seven hours of pure agony".

=== Fictional ===
Fictional incidents of kidney stones have been portrayed in the media on several occasions.

- In season one, episode 11 of Modern Family, Phil Dunphy (Ty Burrell) is seen writhing on the bed because of a kidney stone, and Claire has to drive him to the hospital.
- In season five, episode 11 of Reba entitled "Brock's Got Stones", Brock Hart has kidney stones, and passes them on his own.
- In season two, episodes 15–16 of Deadwood, Al Swearengen (Ian McShane) has kidney stones. These are painfully treated by Doc Cochran (Brad Dourif) using a makeshift device.
- During the 100th episode of the situational comedy Friends, Joey Tribbiani (Matt LeBlanc) suffers back pains and later passes kidney stones.
- On an episode of Seinfeld, Cosmo Kramer (Michael Richards) has a kidney stone. He eventually passes the stone at a carnival, but the pain induced by its passing causes him to scream so loudly that he interrupts the circus and causes a tightrope walker to fall.
- In an episode of the TV comedy M*A*S*H, Maxwell Klinger suffers through and passes a kidney stone.

== See also ==
- Pain
