= Berlin International Literature Festival =

Annual literary event in Berlin, Germany

Logo of the Berlin International Literature Festival

The Berlin International Literature Festival (German: internationales literaturfestival berlin) or ilb is an annual event based in Berlin. Every September, the festival presents contemporary poetry, prose, nonfiction, graphic novels and international children's and young adult literature. Renowned authors present themselves next to new talents within the wide-ranging and political programme. The festival is an event of the "Peter-Weiss-Stiftung für Kunst und Kultur e.V." The founder and former festival director is Ulrich Schreiber. Since 2023, Lavinia Frey has been the director of the festival.

The festival takes place at various locations in Berlin. Since 2005, the main venue has been the Haus der Berliner Festspiele. The festival is primarily supported by the Hauptstadtkulturfonds (Capital Cultural Fund). Other sponsors include the Federal Foreign Office, the Heinrich Böll Foundation, the Foundation Jan Michalski, as well as various other embassies, cultural institutes, and publishers.

== Program ==
The festival's program is divided into literary events, book premieres, and political discussions. A day of the festival is also dedicated to graphic novels. Since 2002, internationally renowned guest authors of the ilb have voluntarily visited Berlin prisons during the festival to read from their books and discuss them with inmates. Since 2005, there have been annual collaborations with Science Year, an initiative by the Federal Ministry of Education and Research. Since 2019, the ilb has cooperated with the Cluster of Excellence "Temporal Communities: Doing Literature in a Global Perspective" at the Free University of Berlin. At all events, texts are presented by the authors in the language they were written, followed by a German translation, which are performed by actors. A discussion between the presenter, author and audience typically follows each reading.

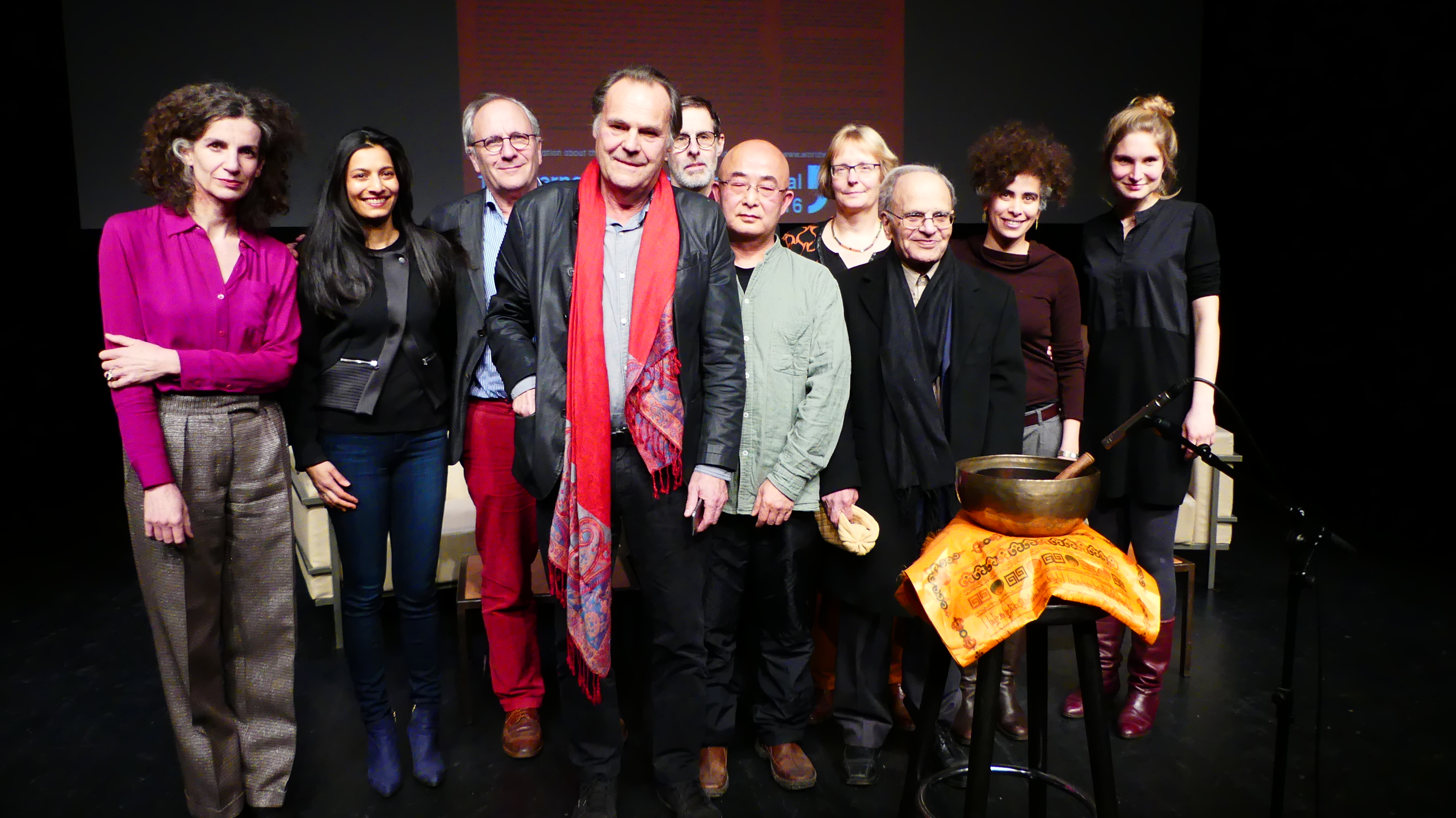
Worldwide Reading for Ashraf Fayadh on 14 January 2016

In November 2015, the Berlin International Literature Festival published an appeal to support Ashraf Fayadh, a Palestinian-Saudi Arabian poet imprisoned and lashed for apostasy, with a Worldwide Reading on 14 January 2016.

Every year, the ilb opens with a celebratory opening event. The opening speakers for each year have been:

- Beata Umubyeyi Mairesse (2024)
- Francesca Melandri (2023)
- David van Reybrouck (2022)
- Leïla Slimani (2021)
- Mario Vargas-Llosa (2020)
- Petina Gappah (2019)
- Eva Menasse (2018)
- Elif Shafak (2017)
- César Aira (2016)
- Javier Marías (2015)
- Pankaj Mishra (2014)
- Taiye Selasi (2013)
- Liao Yiwu (2012)
- Tahar Ben Jelloun (2011)
- Juan Goytisolo (2010)
- Arundhati Roy (2009)
- Nancy Huston (2008)
- David Grossman (2007)
- Édouard Glissant (2006)
- Carlos Fuentes (2005)
- Antjie Krog (2004)
- Shashi Tharoor (2003)
- Dževad Karahasan (2002)
- Charles Simic (2001).

== Das außergewöhnliche Buch ==
Das außergewöhnliche Buch (translation: The Extraordinary Book) is an international children's and youth literature prize. Since 2012, it has been awarded every year in September by the Children's and Youth Literature section of the festival. The award honors remarkable books for children, teenagers and young adults.

The books are selected by a group of voting members that changes annually. The voting group consists mainly of international adult writers and illustrators, and has also included scientists, politicians and young writers. Each member selects one book to be awarded. Members in previous years have included Azouz Begag, John Boyne, Jennifer Clement, Roddy Doyle, Jón Gnarr, David Graeber, Robert Habeck, Navid Kermani, Geert Mak, Scott McCloud, David Van Reybrouck, Boualem Sansal, Riad Sattouf, Raoul Schrott, and Meg Wolitzer.

From 2012 to 2020, 240 books have been awarded, including The Invisible Cities, The Adventures of Pinocchio, The Diary of a Young Girl, the Struwwelpeter, Odyssey, The Little Prince, The Treasure Island, and Around the World in Eighty Days.

=== Multiple award-winning books ===
- Momo by Michael Ende (2012, 2013, twice in 2019)
- The Arrival by Shaun Tan (2013, 2015, 2016, 2019)
- Ronia, the Robber's Daughter by Astrid Lindgren (2012, 2018, 2019)
- Watership Down by Richard Adams (2018, 2020)
- Skellig by David Almond (2016, 2020)
- Don Quixote by Miguel de Cervantes (2016, 2020)
- The Alchemist by Paulo Coelho (2012, 2019)
- Danny Champion of the World by Roald Dahl (2015, 2016)
- Emil and the Detectives by Erich Kästner (2015, 2017)
- The golden compass by Philip Pullman (2012, 2014)
- History of Western Philosophy by Bertrand Russell (2012, 2013)
- Holes by Louis Sachar (2013, 2014)
- The River by Alessandro Sanna (2016, 2018)
- Where the Sidewalk Ends by Shel Silverstein (2014, 2016)
- The Treasure Island by Robert Louis Stevenson (2012, 2014)
- Brown Girl Dreaming by Jacqueline Woodson (2016, 2018)

=== Multiple award-winning writers ===
- Michael Ende, six-time winner for The Night of Wishes, The Neverending Story and Momo
- Roald Dahl, five-time winner for Charlie and the Chocolate Factory, Danny Champion of the World, The Wonderful Story of Henry Sugar and Six More and The BFG
- Shaun Tan, five-time winner for The Lost Thing and The Arrival
- Astrid Lindgren, four-time winner for Mio, My Son and Ronia, the Robber's Daughter
- Tonke Dragt, three-time winner for Letter to the King, Aan de andere kant van de deur and Torenhoog en mijlenbreed
- Erich Kästner, three-time winner for The 35th of May, or Conrad's Ride to the South Seas and Emil and the Detectives
- Mark Twain, three-time winner for The Adventures of Huckleberry Finn, The Adventures of Tom Sawyer and Roughing It

== Guests ==
Since 2001, more than 2,500 authors from more than 120 countries have presented their work at the festival, among them Nobel Prize Winners Svetlana Alexievich, J. M. Coetzee, Nadine Gordimer, Günter Grass, Doris Lessing, Herta Müller, Orhan Pamuk, Wole Soyinka, Mario Vargas Llosa, Gao Xingjian as well as Charles Simic, Han Kang, Juli Zeh, Rebecca Solnit, Monica Ali, Samantha Schweblin, Carla Guelfenbein, Yasmina Reza, Mona Eltahawy, Hanan al-Shaykh, Marie NDiaye, Ozge Samanci, Dacia Maraini, Ljudmila Ulitzkaya, Bernice Chauly, Laksmi Pamuntiak, and Antonio Tabucchi.

== Publications ==
- Catalogue: The annual festival catalogue in contained photos, biographies and selected bibliographies of all participating writers.The catalogue was published until 2021.
- The Berlin Anthology: All authors who participated in the program section 'Literatures of the World' come together and select 99 poems, that will be published in their original language and a German translation.
- Scritture Giovani: Each year, the ilb publishes five short stories which have been exclusively written for the ilb Scritture Giovani contest according to a specific theme in the languages of the five participating countries (UK, Italy, Norway, Germany and a guest country).
