= Lipník nad Bečvou =

Town in Olomouc Region in the Czech Republic

- Town
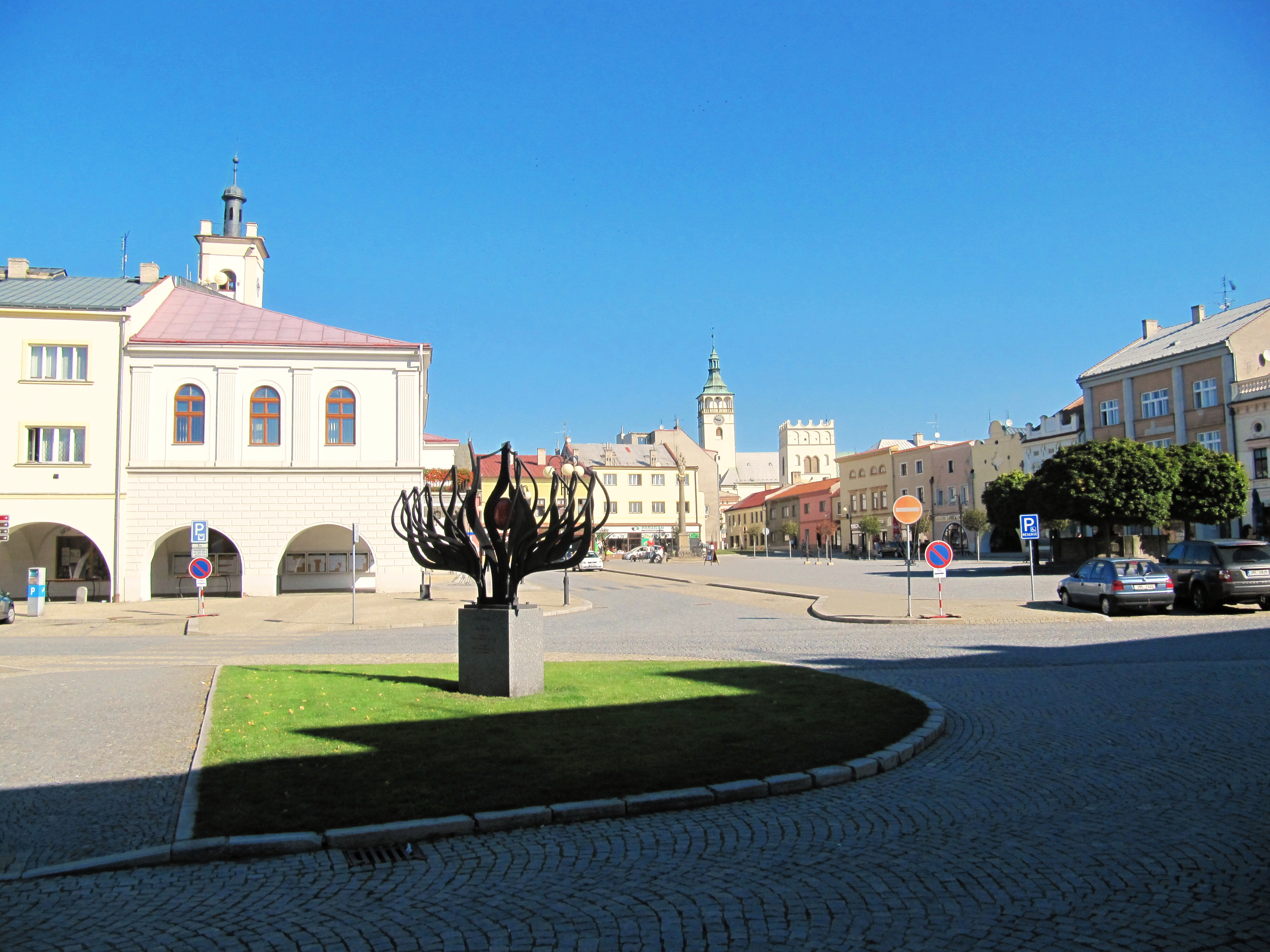
- Town square

- Flag Coat of arms

- Location in the Czech Republic
- Coordinates: 49°31′39″N 17°35′11″E
- Country: Czech Republic
- Region: Olomouc
- District: Přerov
- First mentioned: 1238

Government
  - Mayor: Miloslav Přikryl

Area
  - Total: 30.62 km^{2} (11.82 sq mi)
- Elevation: 233 m (764 ft)

Population (2026-01-01)
  - Total: 8,000
  - Density: 260/km^{2} (680/sq mi)
- Time zone: UTC+1 (CET)
  - Summer (DST): UTC+2 (CEST)
- Postal code: 751 31
- Website: www.mesto-lipnik.cz

Lipník nad Bečvou (Czech pronunciation: [ˈlɪpɲiːk ˈnad bɛtʃvou]; German: Leipnik) is a town in Přerov District in the Olomouc Region of the Czech Republic. It has about 8,000 inhabitants. The town proper is located on the Bečva River in the Moravian Gate.

Lipník nad Bečvou became a town in the first half of the 14th century. The historic town centre is well preserved and is protected as an urban monument reservation.

== Administrative division ==
Lipník nad Bečvou consists of five municipal parts (in brackets population according to the 2021 census):

- Lipník nad Bečvou I-Město (6,607)
- Lipník nad Bečvou III-Nové Dvory (220)
- Lipník nad Bečvou V-Podhoří (308)
- Lipník nad Bečvou VI-Loučka (460)
- Lipník nad Bečvou VII-Trnávka (115)

== Geography ==
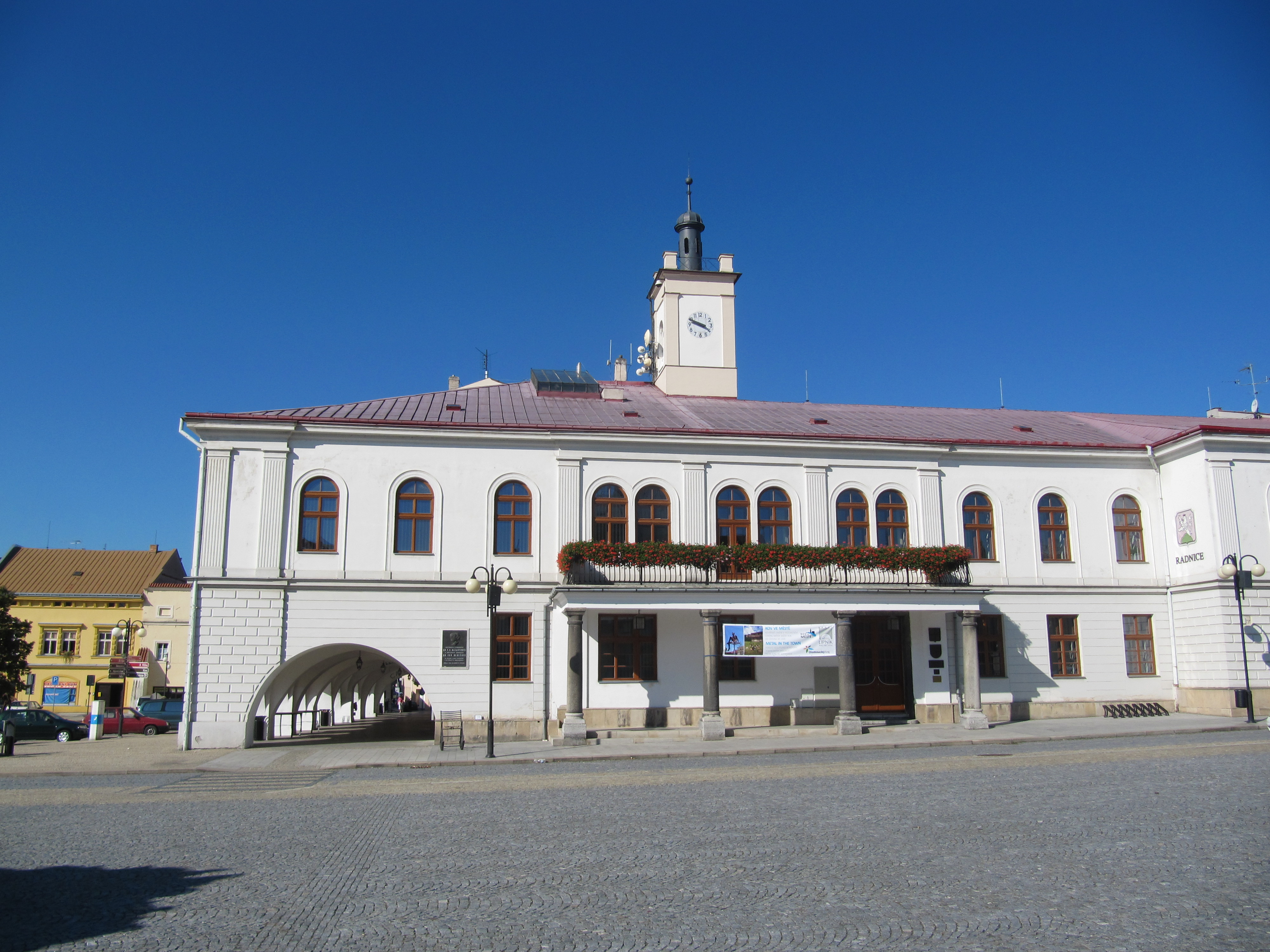
Town hall

Lipník nad Bečvou is located about 12 kilometres (7 mi) northeast of Přerov and 23 km (14 mi) southeast of Olomouc. It lies in the Moravian Gate lowland. A small northeastern part of the municipal territory extends into the Nízký Jeseník mountain range and contains the highest point of Lipník nad Bečvou, which is the hill Juřacka at 589 m (1,932 ft) above sea level. The town is situated on the right bank of the Bečva River.

== History ==
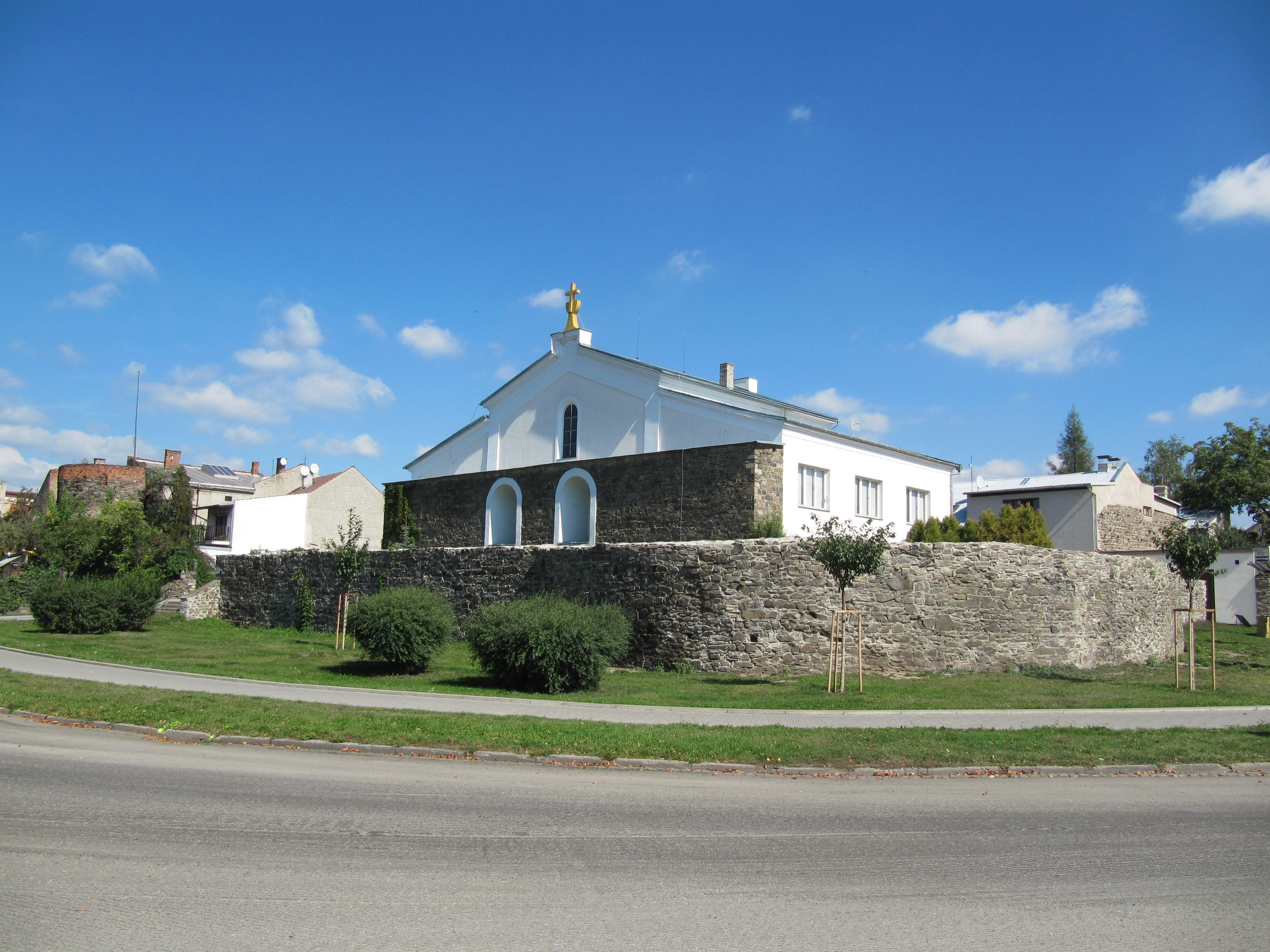
Town walls and former synagogue

The first written mention of Lipník is from 1238. It was a settlement on an important trade route that passed through the Moravian Gate and led to Silesia. Between 1256 and 1266, Drahotuš Castle was founded on a nearby hill and Lipník became the economic centre of the newly established estate. King John of Bohemia bought Lipník probably from Duke Nicholas I and then sold the estate to the Lords of Kravaře in 1325. The settlement prospered and developed because according to a deed from 1349, Lipník was already a rich town. During the rule of the Lords of Kravaře, Lipník obtained various privileges.

Lipník was owned by the lord of Sovinec in 1447–1467 and by the Kostka of Postupice family in 1467–1475. In 1475, the estate was bought by Vilém II of Pernštejn and attached to his extensive assets. In the 16th century, owned by the Pernštejns, Lipník experienced economic growth and general prosperity. The town fortifications were strengthened and guilds were established. The Jewish population was documented from 1454, a Jewish quarter was formed in the first third of the 16th century at the latest.

In 1580, Lipník was obtained by marriage by Peter Vok of Rosenberg, but he was forced to sell it to the Bruntálský of Vrbno family in 1593. They had built a Renaissance castle here in 1609. The properties of the Bruntálský of Vrbno family were confiscated after Bohemian Revolt, and the town was acquired by Cardinal Franz von Dietrichstein. The Dietrichstein family owned Lipník until 1858. In 1634, Franz von Dietrichstein invited the Piarists into the town. They operated here until 1884.

The plague epidemic of 1623–1624 and the Thirty Years' War caused a significant decline in population and economic losses. The stagnation of the town lasted until the 1840s when the town gates and some bastions were demolished, the imperial road was relocated and, above all, Emperor Ferdinand Northern Railway was built. Lipník became an important transhipment point, which brought a new economic impetus. Large markets were held here and crafts developed. In the second half of the 19th century, the town became industrialised.

A large fire in 1858 caused Neoclassical reconstructions in the town centre.

From 1976 to 1990, Bohuslávky was a municipal part of Lipník nad Bečvou under the name Lipník nad Bečvou II-Bohuslávky. From 1976 to 1991, Týn nad Bečvou was a municipal part of Lipník nad Bečvou under the name Lipník nad Bečvou IV-Týn nad Bečvou.

== Demographics ==
Historical population

Year	Pop.	±%
1869	7,096	—
1880	7,365	+3.8%
1890	7,410	+0.6%
1900	7,868	+6.2%
1910	7,965	+1.2%

Year	Pop.	±%
1921	7,549	−5.2%
1930	8,615	+14.1%
1950	8,624	+0.1%
1961	8,300	−3.8%
1970	8,470	+2.0%

Year	Pop.	±%
1980	7,949	−6.2%
1991	8,736	+9.9%
2001	8,575	−1.8%
2011	7,969	−7.1%
2021	7,710	−3.3%

Source: Censuses

== Transport ==
The D1 motorway leading from Přerov to Ostrava bypasses the town in the north. The branch of the motorway, which continues as the D35 leading to Olomouc, separates from D1 on the municipal border.

Lipník nad Bečvou is located on the international railway line Prague–Púchov and on the regional line Přerov–Valašské Meziříčí.

== Sights ==
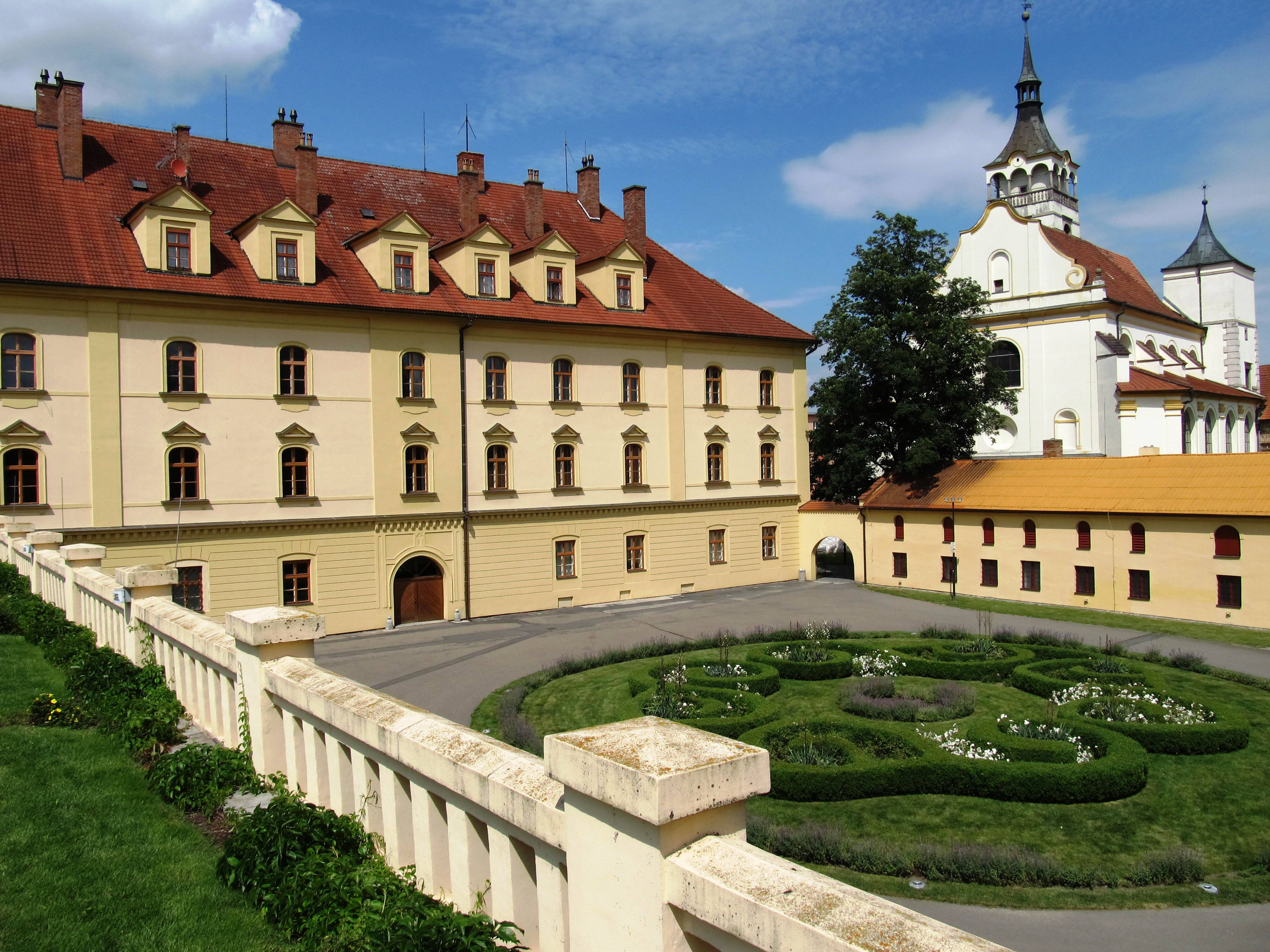
Lipník nad Bečvou Castle and Church of Saint Francis of Assisi

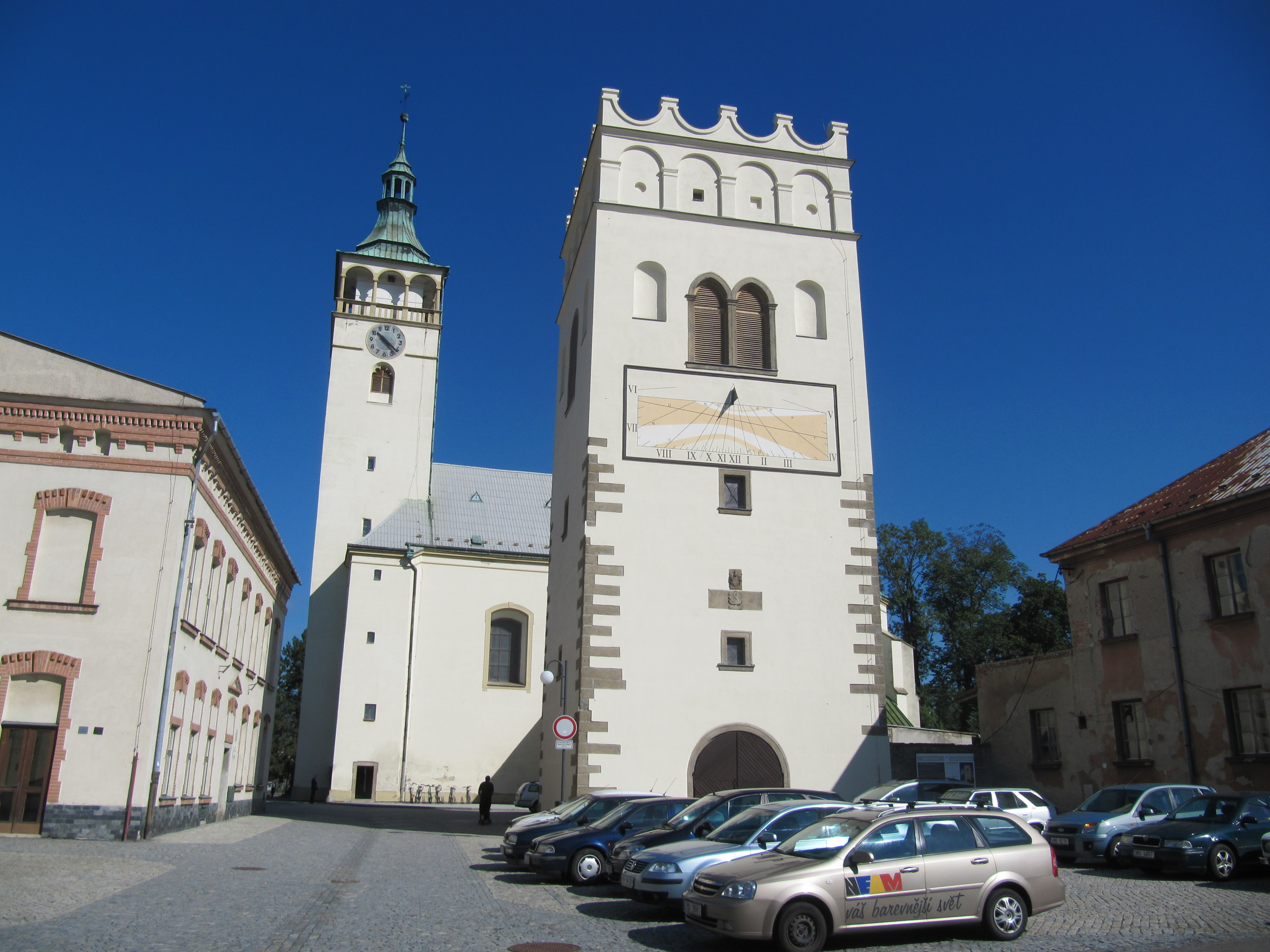
Church of Saint James the Great and the bell tower

Lipník nad Bečvou has a valuable historic core with highly preserved original layout. The town centre is formed by the square Náměstí T. G. Masaryka in the shape of the letter L, and its surroundings, delimited by fragments of the town fortifications. The town centre contains 109 houses, which are protected as cultural monuments, and is protected as an urban monument reservation.

The town square is lined with Renaissance houses with arcades. The town hall was completely reconstructed in the Neoclassical style in 1851. In the middle of the square are two fountains from 1699 and 1859, and a Marian column from 1694.

Next to the square is located the Church of Saint James the Great. This originally Gothic parish church was built before 1400. The tower, today 52 metres (171 ft) high, was raised in 1596 and embellished with a Renaissance arcade gallery. In the 1760s, Baroque modifications were made and also its contemporary interior was created. The separate bell tower next to the church dates from 1609. It is the only bell tower in Moravia preserved in the original late Renaissance style. It contains three bells, including Jakub, which was created in 1464, and Michal, which is one of the largest bells in Moravia.

The Renaissance castle was reconstructed in the Neoclassical style in the 1860s. Today it houses a part of the municipal office. The castle includes an English-style castle park, founded originally as a French formal garden in the mid-17th century. The terrace on the roof of the former stables is arranged as a garden. Next to the castle is located the former Piarist college (built in 1637–1641) and the Church of Saint Francis of Assisi (built in 1682–1687). The church is used for cultural purposes, but the college is in poor condition and inaccessible.

The large Jewish community is commemorated by several monuments, including the former synagogue and two Jewish cemeteries. The synagogue was first mentioned in 1540 and was built shortly before that, together with the town walls. It is the second oldest preserved synagogue in the country. Today it serves as a prayer house of the Czechoslovak Hussite Church.

== Notable people ==
- Yair Bacharach (1639–1702), German rabbi
- Gregor Mendel (1822–1884), Austrian biologist; studied here in 1833–1834
- Wilhelm von Gutmann (1826–1895), Austrian businessman
- Sigmund Friedl (1851–1914), Austrian philatelist
- Emanuel Schreiber (1852–1932), Austrian rabbi and publicist
- Bernhard Münz (1856–1919), Austrian writer and philosopher
- Pavel Vranský (1921–2018), World War II pilot
- Jan Smolík (born 1942), cyclist

== Twin towns – sister cities ==
Lipník nad Bečvou is twinned with:

- Zdzieszowice, Poland
