= Wunschpunsch =

Children's animated series

- German DVD cover featuring the main characters of the show, Jacob (left) and Mauricio (right).
- Also known as: Wounchpounch (French); Der Wunschpunsch (German)
- Genre: Fantasy; Comedy; Slapstick
- Inspired by: The Night of Wishes by Michael Ende
- Developed by: Natalie Altmann; Sophie Decroistte
- Written by: Joël Bassaget; Sylvie Chanteux; Jean Cheville; Fréderique Lenior; Lasar Maravédie; Laurent O'Helix; Claire Paoletti; Olivier Vanelle; Hélène Skantzikas
- Directed by: Philippe Amador
- Starring: Kathleen Fee; Holly Gauthier-Frankel; Susan Glover; Vlasta Vrána; Mark Gamacho; Robert Hidgen; Harry Hill; Rick Jones; Pier Kohl; Pierre Lenoir; Pauline Little; Ricky Mabe; Joanna Noyes; Michael Rudder
- Composers: Haim Saban; Shuki Levy; (as Michel Dax); Deddy Tzur
- Countries of origin: France; Canada
- Original language: English
- No. of seasons: 2
- No. of episodes: 52

Production
- Executive producers: Jacqueline Tordjman; Jacques Pettigrew; Ralf Fronz
- Producers: Bruno Bianchi; Hubert Gariépy
- Running time: 25 minutes
- Production companies: Saban International Paris; CinéGroupe (Note: As CinéGroupe W.P. Inc. Animation services by AKOM Production Co. and Nightstorm Media, ink-and-paint by CinéGroupe Toonteck and Toon Factory.); Ventura Film Distributors B.V; ARD Degeto
- Budget: $13 million

Original release
- Network: Fox Kids (international); TF1 (France); Télévision de Radio-Canada (Canada); Kika (Germany)
- Release: October 14, 2000 – March 16, 2002

Wunschpunsch (French: Wounchpounch, German: Der Wunschpunsch lit. "Wish Punch") is a children's animated series based on the 1989 German novel The Night of Wishes by Michael Ende. The series is a co-production between Saban International Paris, CinéGroupe and TF1, with the participation of Ventura Film Distributors B.V. and ARD/Degeto, and with the collaboration of Radio-Canada. The series centres on two animals, a cat named Mauricio and a raven named Jacob, as they stop the wicked and crazy spells created by their owners, Bubonic and Tyrannia.

The series initially debuted on TF1 in France on October 14, 2000, followed by a subsequent pay-TV debut on Fox Kids channels throughout Europe. The series would make its debut in Canada and Germany the following year on Radio-Canada and Kika, respectively.

== Plot ==
In every episode, an eccentric wizard named Bubonic and his aunt, a vain witch named Tyrannia, must wreak havoc on the city in which they live or suffer a severe punishment from their supervisor, Maledictus T. Maggot. Using a magical parchment, they cast a spell whose effects will become permanent if it is not reversed within 7 hours. Bubonic's and Tyrannia's pets, Mauricio di Mauro and Jacob Scribble, must seek out Aunt Noah, an old turtle at the local zoo and head of the Animal Council, for a riddle on how to reverse the spell, which they manage to do in the nick of time. Bubonic and Tyrannia, who have often been inconvenienced by their own spell due to their clumsiness, are puzzled or relieved at their magic being reversed, before being punished by Maggot for their failure.

== Characters ==
- Mauricio di Mauro: Bubonic's pet, a chubby cat with a large appetite. He likes to brag about his lineage, which goes back to medieval/Venetian times. He is eager and happy-go-lucky, but he's much smarter than he seems. He carries around with him a small red pocket watch, which he uses to keep track of how long he and Jacob have left until each spell is permanent. He is voiced by Rick Jones.
- Jacob Scribble: Tyrannia's pet, a stocky old raven frequently complaining about his rheumatism. He can be uptight, sarcastic, arrogant and proud, but he's good at heart and he genuinely loves and cares for Mauricio. Although he has a main love interest named Ravenia, he is a womaniser despite his plain appearance and, like his book counterpart, has multiple wives. He is talented at many things, such as cello playing, skiing and ice skating. He is voiced by Harry Hill.
- Bubonic Preposteror: An old cranky wizard. He likes to keep things traditional, eschewing modern technology. He fits into the stereotypical view of an old medieval wizard living in a derelict tower. His hobbies include playing his cello and gardening, but as expected from an evil wizard, his garden is full of dangerous flesh eating plants and his cello playing is horrible. He is voiced by Rick Jones.
- Tyrannia Vampirella: Bubonic's aunt. Despite being older than her nephew, Tyrannia embraces modern technology and fashion, to the point of calling Bubonic an old fashioned relic. Much to Bubonic's annoyance, she also likes loud music. She wears a different outfit (and sometimes hairstyle/color) in every episode. She is voiced by Kathleen Fee.
- Maledictus T. Maggot: The supervisor of the two wizards, a very powerful wizard himself and the main antagonist of the series. Maggot looks like a combination between a humanoid bug and amphibian. At the start of almost every episode he appears before the wizards and reminds them they need to cast an evil curse on the city or the consequences will be nasty. Naturally, due to the interference of two protagonists (Mauricio and Jacob), their curse fails, causing Maggot to punish the wizards, usually turning them into something related to the curse of the episode. Despite the fact that he's evil and grumpy, he is happily married. He is voiced by Vlasta Vrána.
- Auntie Noah: A wise old tortoise living in the Megalopolis Zoo. She assists Mauricio and Jacob by giving advice on how to break the curse, always in the form of a riddle. She has some magical abilities of her own, such as in "Life With Maggot" when she visits Mauricio and Jacob in a dream. Although she is not from the original novel, she is inspired by other turtles and tortoises from Ende's works such as Morla from The Neverending Story and Cassiopeia from Momo. She is voiced by Joanna Noyes.
- The Cozy family: The neighbors of the wizards. Mauricio is on good terms with their son Kip. They are seen in most episodes to show the effects of the wizards' newest curse.
- Mayor Plaga: The overweight mayor of Megalopolis, a typical self-centered politician. He isn't very competent but he cares about his city.
- Chief Hydrant: The local firefighter who has a bitter rivalry with the Mayor.
- Barbara Blabber: The local news reporter who is full of herself. Bubonic is attracted to her.
- The animal council: A lioness, goat, pig and monkey who are Auntie Noah's subordinates.
- Meathead: Bubonic's pet carnivorous plant.
- Oak Foot: Chief Hydrant's pet dog. He sometimes helps Mauricio and Jacob on their missions.
- Mrs. Maggot: Maggot's wife. She loves and cares for her husband, and although she's not evil like him, she gently bosses him around. In the final episode she temporarily replaced him as Tyrannia and Bubonic's supervisor due to him getting sick.

== Episodes ==
=== Series overview ===
Season	Episodes	Originally released	
Season	Episodes	First released	Last released
1	26	October 14, 2000	April 7, 2001
2	26	September 22, 2001	March 16, 2002

=== Season 1 (2000-2001) ===
No. overall	No. in season	Title	Original release date
1	1	"Plant Panic"	October 14, 2000
Tyrannia and Bubonic make the plants grow and turn evil.
2	2	"Double Trouble"	October 21, 2000
Tyrannia and Bubonic make any mirror create a double of a person who looks at it.
3	3	"Worst Noel"	October 28, 2000
Tyrannia and Bubonic ruin Christmas by making the toys received by the children alive and evil.
4	4	"Terrible Toddlers"	November 4, 2000
Inspired by an idea from their boss Maggot, Tyrannia and Bubonic turn everyone into children.
5	5	"Colorless Chaos"	November 11, 2000
Tyrannia and Bubonic turn the city black and white.
6	6	"Off the Walls"	November 18, 2000
Tyrannia and Bubonic make paintings alive.
7	7	"Prehistorical Populace"	November 25, 2000
Tyrannia and Bubonic turn everyone into cavemen.
8	8	"Big Feet"	December 2, 2000
Tyrannia and Bubonic accidentally enlarge everyone's feet.
9	9	"The King's Aunt"	December 9, 2000
Tyrannia and Bubonic turn the city back to the Middle Ages. However, Bubonic sabotages the spell in order to make himself a king and turn Tyrannia into his slave.
10	10	"Appliance Alliance"	December 16, 2000
Tyrannia and Bubonic make electrical appliances come to life and do what they want.
11	11	"Invasion of the Giant Insects"	December 23, 2000
Tyrannia and Bubonic make insects huge and menacing.
12	12	"Wishful Thinking"	December 30, 2000
Tyrannia and Bubonic make anyone's wish come true, but the wish usually turns against the person. This is the first episode where Tyrannia and Bubonic try to get rid of Maggot from their lives and did not receive their punishment at the end.
13	13	"The Beastie Brew"	January 6, 2001
Tyrannia and Bubonic turn everyone into animals.
14	14	"Once Upon a Potion"	January 13, 2001
Tyrannia and Bubonic make fairy tale characters come to life.
15	15	"Car Wars"	January 20, 2001
Tyrannia and Bubonic turn everyone into cars.
16	16	"The Wild Wild Pets"	January 27, 2001
Tyrannia and Bubonic turn domestic pets into wild animals, including Mauricio who was half blasted by the magic, except for Jacob since ravens are not domestic pets.
17	17	"Wacky Weather"	February 3, 2001
Tyrannia and Bubonic make the weather change constantly and unexpectedly.
18	18	"Lost Spell"	February 10, 2001
Tyrannia and Bubonic make everyone's things get lost.
19	19	"Poubelle and Back"	February 17, 2001
Tyrannia and Bubonic make garbage double and return to the place of the person who threw it away.
20	20	"Sand Witch"	February 24, 2001
Tyrannia and Bubonic turn the city into a desert.
21	21	"Bubonic Plague"	March 3, 2001
Tyrannia and Bubonic turn everyone into themselves (men are turned into Bubonic and women are turned into Tyrannia). Things become more complicated when Jacob accidentally gets turned into a chicken.
22	22	"Ghost Town"	March 10, 2001
Tyrannia and Bubonic turn the city into a ghost town, causing spirits to roam around freely. Whenever a ghost successfully scares someone, it multiplies into two.
23	23	"You Must Be Joking"	March 17, 2001
Tyrannia and Bubonic turn everyone into practical jokers.
24	24	"By a Hair's Breadth"	March 24, 2001
Tyrannia and Bubonic make everyone's hair grow everywhere on their body except the head.
25	25	"Goin' Garbanzo"	March 31, 2001
Tyrannia and Bubonic turn everyone's heads into fruit, vegetables and plants. Tyrannia and Meathead accidentally merge with each other when they fall into the cauldron during the spellcasting.
26	26	"Night of Wishes"	April 7, 2001
This episode, based on the main book, recalls how Mauricio and Jacob first met, and Tyrannia and Bubonic's first spell which polluted the city.

=== Season 2 (2001-2002) ===
No. overall	No. in season	Title	Original release date
27	1	"Life with Maggot"	September 22, 2001
Maggot takes Mauricio and Jacob away from Tyrannia and Bubonic to his house. Mauricio and Jacob seem to have a great time with Mrs. Maggot. Meanwhile, in order to have pets around, Tyrannia and Bubonic separate other pets from their owners. Note: The English Dub of this episode has 2 shots missing, as some recordings online of the Russian Dub that use the English Audio left the removed shots (which are present in this) mute.
28	2	"Let's Break a Deal"	September 29, 2001
Bubonic meets a mysterious wizard who gives him great powers. Bubonic then uses his new advanced powers to turn the city upside down.
29	3	"Slowly But Surely"	October 6, 2001
Tyrannia and Bubonic make everyone very slow. Only those who are awake when the spell was cast don't get affected by it.
30	4	"Gloom with a View"	October 13, 2001
Tyrannia and Bubonic make everyone very depressed.
31	5	"Mayor for a Day"	October 20, 2001
In order to not have an amusement park in their yard, Tyrannia decides to switch Bubonic's body with the Mayor's. It works, but everything goes out of control when Bubonic and the Mayor decide to stay in each other's bodies permanently and Mauricio and Jacob have switched bodies too.
32	6	"Good for Nothing"	October 27, 2001
Tyrannia and Bubonic make everyone useless in anything they're good at.
33	7	"Fancy Footwork"	November 3, 2001
Tyrannia and Bubonic make everyone's shoes dance without stopping.
34	8	"Shadow of a Doubt"	November 10, 2001
Tyrannia and Bubonic turn everyone into shadows whenever they are exposed to sunlight.
35	9	"Nice Wizards"	November 17, 2001
Tyrannia and Bubonic plan to dispel Maggot's evil attitude and turn it into a nice one. Mauricio and Jacob decide to sabotage the spell to also affect their owners. It works, but Tyrannia and Bubonic's niceness goes out of control when they get everyone into trouble while helping.
36	10	"Inspector Maggot"	November 24, 2001
In order to get rid of Maggot from their lives, Tyrannia and Bubonic make him the inspector of everyone in the city.
37	11	"Vanity Spell"	December 1, 2001
Tyrannia and Bubonic make all adults in the city extremely self-centered and to not pay attention to children.
38	12	"Drop Me a Line"	December 8, 2001
Tyrannia and Bubonic make lines endless.
39	13	"Money Can't Buy Happiness"	December 15, 2001
Tyrannia and Bubonic make money multiply, causing everyone to become greedy.
40	14	"Happy Valentine"	December 22, 2001
Tyrannia and Bubonic ruin Valentine's Day by making everyone's lover turn against that person after reading a Valentine card.
41	15	"Simply Irresistible"	December 29, 2001
Bubonic reluctantly agrees to help Tyrannia become irresistible to the men in the city. However, when Maggot also becomes attracted to her, everything goes out of control.
42	16	"Ty-me Travel"	January 5, 2002
Tyrannia and Bubonic, along with Mauricio and Jacob, go back in time – to the Middle Ages – to prevent Maggot's parents from meeting to prevent him from being born and getting involved in their lives. However, they forget to create a way back to the 21st century, causing them to be trapped in the past (much to Jacob's dismay, since birds like him were often cooked and eaten in Middle Ages).
43	17	"The Great Escape"	January 12, 2002
Tyrannia and Bubonic make walls permeable, which ruins everyone's privacy.
44	18	"Two Cute"	January 19, 2002
Tyrannia and Bubonic glue people who are arguing together. Maurizio and Jacob have a fallout and are glued to each other too.
45	19	"Quiz the Wizard"	January 26, 2002
Tyrannia and Bubonic turn the city into game shows.
46	20	"Achoo!"	February 2, 2002
When Tyrannia comes down with a bad cold, she and Bubonic make everyone excluding Mauricio and Jacob sneeze constantly, as if they caught her cold.
47	21	"The Big Shrinking Spell"	February 9, 2002
Tyrannia and Bubonic make everyone shrink when they get wet.
48	22	"Abominable Behavior"	February 16, 2002
Tyrannia and Bubonic make snowmen alive and malicious.
49	23	"The Pinocchio Syndrome"	February 23, 2002
Tyrannia and Bubonic turn everyone into liars. A sabotage made by Mauricio results in everyone's noses get longer whenever they lie, exposing them.
50	24	"Perchance to Dream - Not!"	March 2, 2002
Tyrannia and Bubonic turn everyone's dreams into nightmares, which later become real during the day. As in Slowly But Surely, only those who are awake when the spell is cast are unaffected, including the wizards and Jacob.
51	25	"It's a Dog's Life"	March 9, 2002
Tyrannia and Bubonic turn everyone into dogs.
52	26	"The War of the Sex"	March 16, 2002
Tyrannia and Bubonic make the city's men and women turn against each other. Maggot is sick and his wife temporarily takes his place as Tyrannia and Bubonic's supervisor.

== Development and broadcast ==
The show was first confirmed to be in development in August 1996 under the book's title of Night of the Wishes, when Saban Entertainment and the German ARD network agreed to a three-year, $50 million co-production and library program licensing agreement. The other show to be produced in the agreement was Jim Button.

In February 2000, the series began development under the name Wunschpunsch, being produced by the French Saban International Paris and the Canadian CinéGroupe, and was pre-sold to Radio-Canada and TF1 in the same month. By October 2000, the show was confirmed to air on Fox Kids networks around Europe and the Middle East and later premiered in France near the end of the year.

The series premiered on Radio-Canada in French on September 8, 2001. Followed on with a German broadcast on KiKA on November 9, 2001, airing every weekday, and on ARD November 18, 2001, where a new episode aired every Sunday.

From 2009-2010, the series reran on Jetix Play. Reruns of the series aired in the Netherlands in 2011–2012 on Disney Channel, and between July 2016 and February 2017 on Unis, in Canada.
