= Benjamin Schreiber =

Benjamin Schreiber may refer to:

- Benjamin Schreiber (criminal) (1952 or 1953–2023), American murderer
- Benjamin F. Schreiber (1885–1972), American lawyer and judge
