= Bernhard Münz =

Austrian writer, philosopher, and librarian

- Born: 1 February 1856; Leipnik, Austrian Empire
- Died: 17 December 1919 (aged 63); Vienna, First Austrian Republic
- Spouse: Amalie Müller (m. 1888)

Education
- Thesis: Die platonische Ideenlehre (1877)
- Doctoral advisor: Franz Brentano

Bernhard Münz (1 February 1856 – 17 December 1919) was a writer, philosopher, and librarian from Austria-Hungary.

== Biography ==
He was born in Leipnik (now Lipník, Czech Republic) to Jewish parents Johanna (née Weinreb) and Jakob Münz. His younger brother was journalist Sigmund Münz.

Münz studied classical philology and philosophy at the University of Vienna, the University of Innsbruck, and the Ludwig-Maximilians-Universität München, completing a Ph.D. at the former in 1877 under the supervision of Franz Brentano. After working briefly at the university library at the University of Graz, he became in 1889 amanuensis in the library of the Israelitische Kultusgemeinde Wien, and succeeded Samuel Hammerschlag as its director in 1900.

He wrote magazine articles for various publications, including Ost und West, the Allgemeine Zeitung des Judentums, the Neue Freie Presse, and Deutschland. He promoted Salomon Wininger's project of compiling a Jewish national biography and was on the editorial board from 1915; the first volume appeared in 1925. He was vice president of the journalists' and writers' association Concordia and did much to build up the association's charitable work for widows and orphans.

== Publications ==
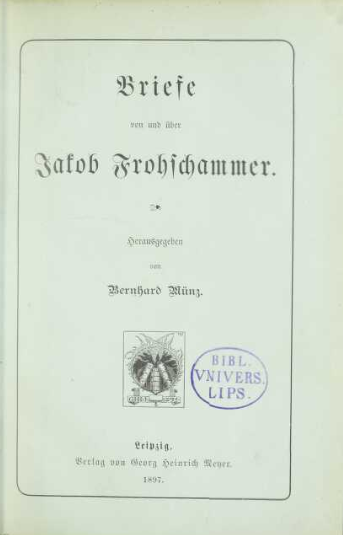
Title page of Briefe von und über Jakob Frohschammer

- Die Keime der Erkenntnisstheorie in der vorsophistischen Periode der griechischen Philosophie. Vienna: C. Konegen. 1880. hdl:2027/mdp.39015068014144.
- Die Erkenntniss- und Sensationstheorie des Protagoras. Vienna: C. Konegen. 1880.
- Die Vorsokratische Ethik. Halle. 1882.
- Protagoras und Kein Ende. Halle. 1883.
- Lebens- und Weltfragen. Vienna: C. Konegen. 1886.
- Jakob Frohschammer, der Philosoph der Weltphantasie. Breslau: S. Schottlaender. 1894.
- Briefe von und über Jakob Frohschammer. Leipzig: Georg Heinrich Meyer. 1897.
- P. Simon Rettenbacher. Vienna. 1898.
- Adolph Pichler. Leipzig: Baum. 1899.
- Moriz Lazarus. Berlin: F. Dümmler. 1900.
- Hieronymus Lorm. Vienna. 1901.
- M. E. delle Grazie als Dichterin und Denkerin. Vienna: W. Braumüller. 1902.
- Literarische Physiognomien. Vienna: W. Braumüller. 1903.
- Goethe als Erzieher. Vienna: W. Braumüller. 1904.
- Hebbel als Denker. Munich: Georg Müller. 1913 [1907].
- Ibsen als Erzieher. Leipzig: Xenien. 1908.
- Shakespeare als Philosoph. Halle: Niemeyer. 1918.
