= Özge Samancı =

Turkist-American artist and author (born 1975)

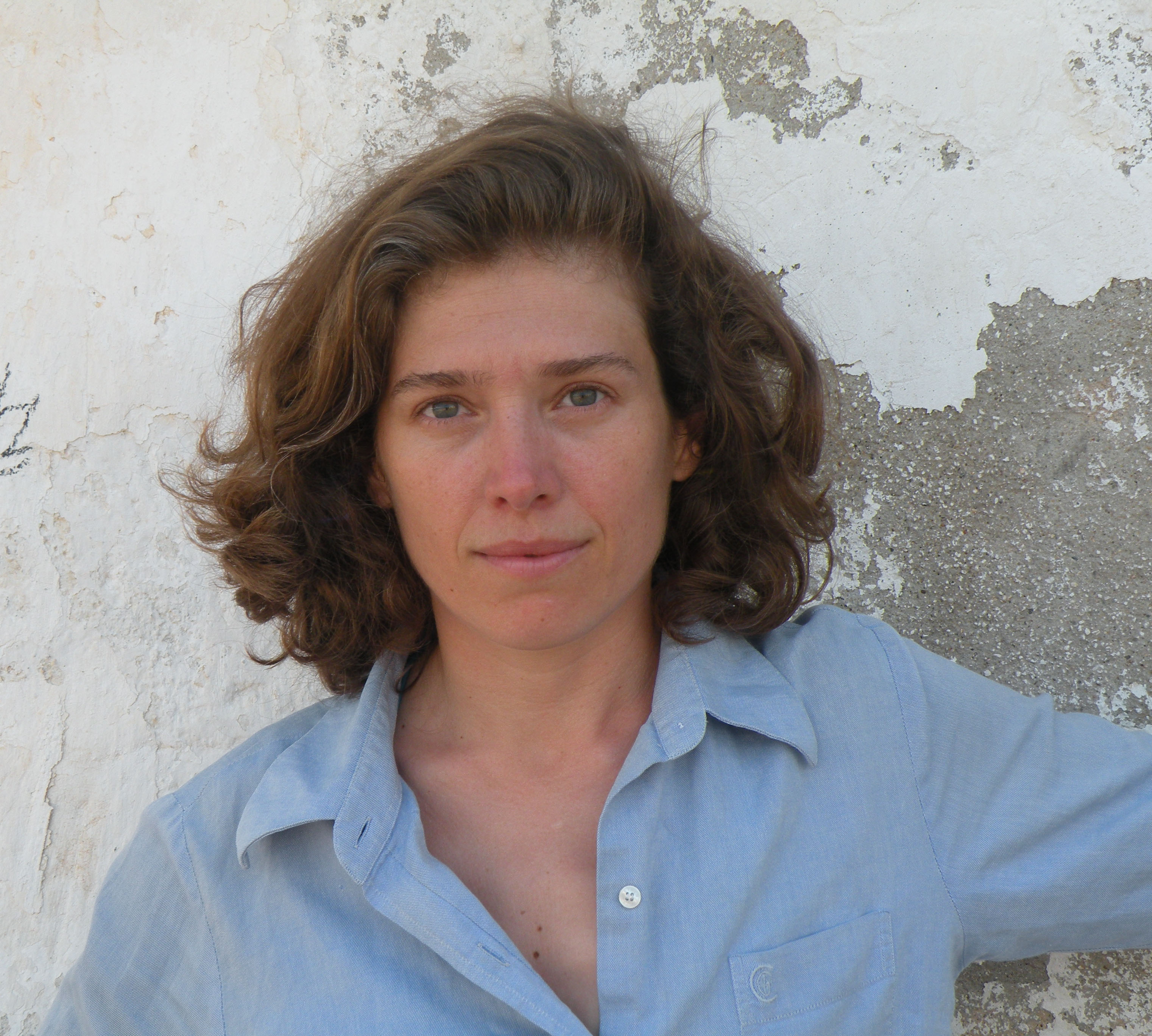
- Born: July 21, 1975 (age 51); İzmir, Turkey
- Occupations: Media Artist, author, professor
- Website: Özge Samancı; Comics

Özge Samancı (born 21 July 1975 in İzmir) is a Turkish-American media artist, and a professor at Northwestern University`s School of Communication. She creates media art installations and graphic novels. Her art installations merge computer code and bio-sensors with comics, animation, interactive narrations, performance, and projection art. Her installations use media arts to break down people's mental and emotional barriers and hear about environmental issues. Her graphic novels combine drawings with three-dimensional objects.

She is the author of an autobiographical graphic novel Dare to Disappoint (Farrar Straux Giroux, 2015).

She won a 2017 Berlin Prize with her graphic novel project Not Here but Everywhere. Her graphic novel Dare to Disappoint received international press attention and in 2016 won both Middle East Book Award and 30th Annual New York Book Show Award. She was a guest at the Berlin International Literature Festival. She won the 2020 Distinguished Alumna Award from Georgia Institute of Technology.

== Life ==
Samanci was born in 1975. She grew up in the coastal city of Izmir with her teacher parents. She studied mathematics at Boğaziçi University and published cartoons in humor and film magazines. She moved to the United States to pursue a Ph.D. on digital media at the Georgia Institute of Technology. Her interest in comics expanded into visual arts and experimental media and she received an Andrew Mellon Postdoctoral Fellowship in the Art Practice Department of University of California, Berkeley.

== Graphic novels and comics ==
Dare to Disappoint is Samanci's graphic coming-of-age memoir published by Farrar Straus and Giroux. Her story takes place after the military coup leading to Turkey's rapid change to neo-capitalism from 1980 to 2000. The book was translated into six languages. After going through the struggle of obtaining a degree in mathematics to please her father and society, she becomes a cartoonist and media artist.

Evil Eyes Sea, her second graphic novel, is inspired by semi-autobiographical details. Ece and Meltem are economically struggling engineering students. They witness a freak accident. Ece and Meltem’s investigation into the accident will lead them on a search for truth and treasure hidden under the Bosphorus. Their hopes of solving their personal financial troubles become entangled with a political corruption story. Evil Eyes Sea was in the Best Graphic Novels of 2024 list of and The Guardian. won the Cartoonist Studio Prize 2025 and 2026 Max and Moritz Prize, Best International Comic

Her drawings have appeared in The New Yorker, The Wall Street Journal, Slate Magazine, The Huffington Post, Airmail, Guernica and The Rumpus. Samanci ran Ordinary Things, an online comics journal with more than 1800 comic-collage images depicting her daily observations, from 2016 through 2020.

== Interactive art installations ==
Wastwaste is data driven and it draws parallels between space and marine pollution.

In You Are the Ocean, participants can control the installation's oceanic imagery with their minds.

Fiber Optic Ocean composes music generated by live data from sharks and humans.

Her interactive installations have been exhibited internationally, NOVA – RIO Biennial of Art and Technology at the Museu do Amanhã, Siggraph Art Gallery, FILE festival, Currents New Media, Science Gallery, The Tech Museum of Innovation, WRO Media Art Biennale, Athens International Festival of Digital Arts and New Media, Piksel Electronic Arts Festival, Ibrida Festival, Fondazione Dino Zoli Arte Contemporanea, and ISEA among others.

== Awards and recognition ==
- 2026, Max and Moritz Prize, Best International Comic
- 2025, The Cartoonist Studio Prize
- 2023, The Artist Fellowship Award, Media Arts, Illinois Arts Council Agency (IACA)
- 2022, Nomination to Wolinski Prize with Dare to Disappoint
- 2020, The Ivan Allen College of Liberal Arts Distinguished Alumni Award, Georgia Institute of Technology
- 2017, Berlin Prize, American Academy in Berlin
- 2016, Dare to Disappoint, Middle East Book Award
- 2016, Dare to Disappoint, 30th Annual New York Book Show
- 2015, Clarence Simon Award for Teaching and Mentoring
- 2015, Fall, Dare to Disappoint was awarded the designation of “A Junior Library Guild Selection”

== Bibliography ==
- 2024, Evil Eyes Sea (Graphic Novel), Uncivilized Books.
- 2015, Dare to Disappoint (Autobiographical Graphic Novel), Farrar, Straus and Giroux. Translated to Dutch, Korean, Italian, Turkish, Persian, Romanian.
- 2004, Animasyonun Onlenemez Yukselisi (The Irresistible Rise of Animation), Istanbul Bilgi University Publications.
