= Princes in Exile =

Canadian coming of age drama

Princes in Exile is a 1990 Canadian feature-length coming of age drama about a group of young people at a summer camp for kids with cancer, directed by Giles Walker, written by Joe Wiesenfeld, based on a novel of the same name by Mark Schreiber. The film follows a 17-year-old protagonist, Ryan, played by Zachary Ansley, and the friends he makes over the summer. The film title is derived from the joking term the film characters adopt to describe themselves. Other characters in the film include Robert (Nicholas Shields), the camp's daredevil, who suffers from Lymphoid leukemia, as well as Holly (Stacie Mistysyn), a girl who has lost part of her leg, who becomes emotionally involved with Ryan. Chuck Shamata plays the camp director. The 103-minute film was produced by John Dunning and was a co-production of Cinepix, the Canadian Broadcasting Corporation and National Film Board of Canada. It was released theatrically in the United States by Fries Entertainment.

The film received the best screenplay award at the Montreal World Film Festival.
