= Bohuslávky =

- Municipality
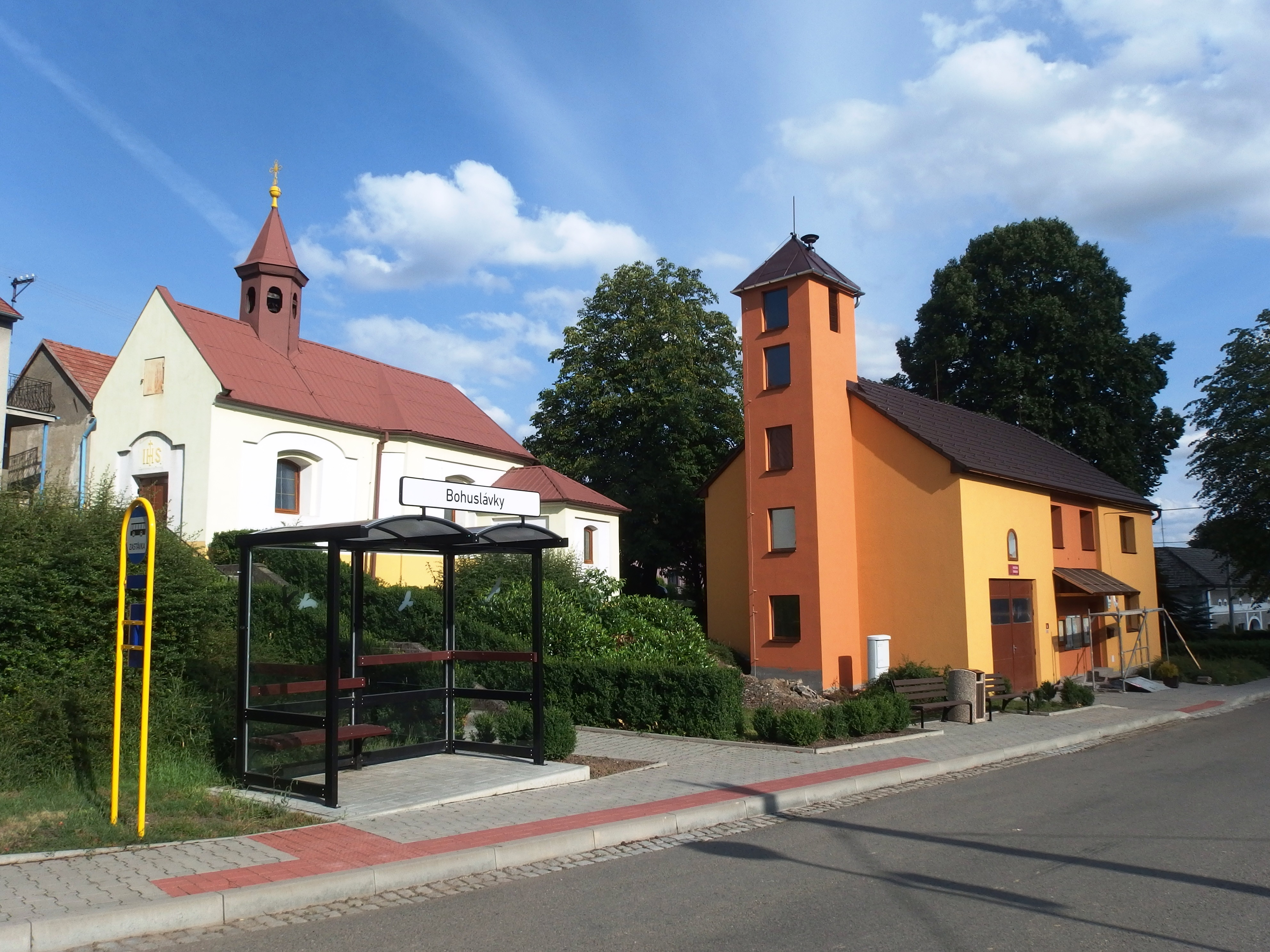
- Chapel of All Saints and the municipal office

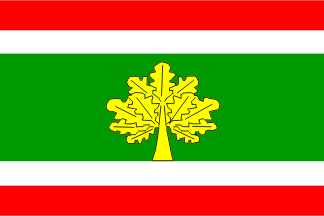
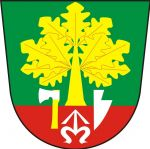
- Flag Coat of arms

- Location in the Czech Republic
- Coordinates: 49°33′19″N 17°34′4″E
- Country: Czech Republic
- Region: Olomouc
- District: Přerov
- First mentioned: 1322

Area
  - Total: 2.89 km^{2} (1.12 sq mi)
- Elevation: 297 m (974 ft)

Population (2026-01-01)
  - Total: 323
  - Density: 112/km^{2} (289/sq mi)
- Time zone: UTC+1 (CET)
  - Summer (DST): UTC+2 (CEST)
- Postal code: 751 31
- Website: www.bohuslavky.cz

Bohuslávky is a municipality and village in Přerov District in the Olomouc Region of the Czech Republic. It has about 300 inhabitants.

Bohuslávky lies approximately 14 kilometres (9 mi) north-east of Přerov, 24 km (15 mi) east of Olomouc, and 234 km (145 mi) east of Prague.

== Demographics ==
Historical population
Year	Pop.	±%
1869	267	—
1880	301	+12.7%
1890	317	+5.3%
1900	340	+7.3%
1910	355	+4.4%
1921	364	+2.5%
1930	393	+8.0%
1950	376	−4.3%
1961	413	+9.8%
1970	417	+1.0%
1980	418	+0.2%
1991	367	−12.2%
2001	345	−6.0%
2011	338	−2.0%
2021	307	−9.2%
Source: Censuses
