= Ulrich Schreiber =

Ulrich Schreiber (born July 5, 1951 in Solingen, Germany) is a German cultural manager. He is the founder and was the director of the International Literature Festival Berlin until March 2023. He is co-founder and co-director of the International Literature Festival Odesa with Hans Ruprecht.

== Life ==
Schreiber studied civil engineering from 1970 to 1973 and Philosophy, Politics and Russian at the FU Berlin from 1973 to 1981. He passed the II State Examination in Celle in 1984.

From 1979 to 1981 he was editor of the magazine Moderne Zeiten. In 1980 he co-founded - with Wolfgang Fritz Haug, Robert Jungk, Helmut Gollwitzer and others - the Berlin People's University, as well as the Hamburg People's University in 1983. In 1985 he directed the German-Italian Cultural Festival in Hamburg, the core of which was an international congress on Antonio Gramsci and Rosa Luxemburg. In the 1980s and 1990s, he worked as a cultural manager and architect in Hamburg, Stuttgart and Berlin. In 1989 he founded the International Peter Weiss Society, which he chaired until 1998. In 1998 he organized the Thomas Bernhard Days in Berlin at the Literaturhaus Berlin.

In 2001, he founded the International Literature Festival Berlin, which is organized by the Peter Weiss Foundation. With Dr. Rolf Hosfeld, he served on the board of the Foundation from 1993 to 2022.

Since 2005, Schreiber is one of the co-initiators of the PEN World Voices festival in New York. He also participated in the organization of the New York Festival of International Literature and a literary festival in Mumbai in 2007. He created the Graphic Novel Day with the international literature festival berlin in 2011, in collaboration with EUNIC. He has organized the Worldwide Readings since 2006, and Worldwide Screenings since 2020. Schreiber was a member of the PEN Center Germany, and was one of the co-founders of PEN Berlin in 2022. In 2015 he initiated the Odessa International Literature Festival with Hans Ruprecht. From 2015 to 2023, he was a member of the General Assembly of the Heinrich Böll Foundation.

Ulrich Schreiber lives together with his wife Claudia Benker-Schreiber in Berlin, Germany.

== Writings (in German) ==
As an author

- The political theory of Antonio Gramsci, Berlin 1980, 4th edition 1994

As a publisher

- White-Book of cultural and educational policies in Hamburg (Weißbuch für Kulturpolitik in Hamburg). Hamburg 1986
- The imagery of Peter Weiss (Die Bilderwelt des Peter Weiss). Hamburg/Berlin 1995
- Anthologies and ilb catalogues of 2001–2022
- Refugees Worldwide 1-3, Literary Reportages, Berlin 2017 - 2022

== Films ==
- What Matters, in collaboration with Norbert Kron, 2017
- Voices on War - new film on the Ukraine War, in collaboration with Norbert Kron, 2022

== Awards ==
In 2015, Schreiber was awarded the decoration of "Chevalier de l'Ordre des Arts et des Lettres" by the French Ministry of Culture for his "contribution to the radiance of the arts and literature in France and the world".
