= Emanuel Schreiber =

American rabbi (1852-1932)

Emanuel Schreiber (December 13, 1852, in Lipník nad Bečvou, Moravia – March 1932, in Chicago) was an American rabbi.

== Life ==
Schreiber received his education at the Talmudical college of his native town, the rabbinical seminary at Eisenstadt, Hungary, and the Hochschule in Berlin (Ph.D., Heidelberg, 1873). In 1874 he was appointed teacher at the Samson School at Wolfenbüttel, and subsequently became rabbi of Elbing (1875) and Bonn on the Rhine (1878). Later, Schreiber came to the United States, having in 1881 accepted a call to the rabbinate of Mobile, Ala., where he remained until 1883, when he was elected rabbi of Denver, Colorado. He then held successively the rabbinates of Los Angeles, California (1885–89); Little Rock, Arkansas (1889–91); Spokane, Washington (1891–92); Toledo, Ohio (1892–97); and Youngstown, Ohio (1897–1899). From 1899 he was rabbi of Congregation Emanu-El, Chicago.

Schreiber was editor of the "Jüdische Gemeinde- und Familien-Zeitung" (later "Die Reform") from 1876 to 1881, and of the "Chicago Occident" from 1893 to 1896; and he wrote many essays for the Jewish press. Of his works may be mentioned:

- "Die Principien des Judenthums Verglichen mit Denen des Christentums," Leipzig, 1877
- "Abraham Geiger," ib. 1879
- "Erzählungen der Heiligen Schrift," 4th ed., Leipzig, 1880
- "Die Selbstkritik der Juden," Berlin, 1880, and Leipzig, 1890
- "Graetz's Geschichtsbauerei," ib. 1881
- "Der Talmud vom Standpunkt des Modernen Judenthums," ib. 1881
- "The Talmud," Denver, 1884
- "Reform Judaism and Its Pioneers," Spokane, 1892
- "Moses Bloch, a Biography," Chicago, 1894
- "The Bible in the Light of Science," Pittsburg, 1897.
