= Johann Friedrich Schreiber =

Johann Friedrich Schreiber Latinized as Ioannis Fredrici Schreiber (May 25, 1705 – January 28, 1760) was a German physician and philosopher. He attempted to make medicine into system that was mechanistic and mathematical according to the iatromathematical or iatromechanical school.

== Life and work ==
Schreiber was born in Königsberg. In 1721, he went to study medicine at the University of Königsberg where his father Michael Schreiber (1662-1717) was professor of theology. He then moved to the University of Leiden where he became a friend of fellow student Albrecht Haller. In 1728 he received his doctorate in medicine and practiced briefly. He was interested in academics and he contacted Christian Wolff (1679-1754) and sought to apply his philosophy in medicine. He joined Leipzig University where he taught from 1729. In 1731 he published Elementorum Medicinae physico-mathematicorum. The preface was written by Wolff. Schreiber subscribed to the iatromechanical school which sought to treat medicine as a form of applied mathematics and physics. He followed ideas from Archibald Pitcairne (1652-1713) and Herman Boerhaave (1668-1738) under whom he studied at Leiden. He sought a mathematical deductive approach within medicine. He considered the soul to be outside the scope of medicine and considers the human body to be a composite. He approaches the description of the body along the lines of geometry with points (cells), forming fibres which made up surfaces (membrane boundaries), and surfaces forming curves or tubes (veins and arteries) and more complex structures. In the book he deals with solids and liquids in the first part followed by veins and arteries. He made a distinction between natural and artificial medicine noting that there was a natural disposition of the body towards health. Forces (vires) acted to move the body towards health (sanitas) and disease (morbus) and that a mathematical understanding was what medicine should seek. He believed that every physician should understand physics and sought to explain the flow of blood using atmospheric pressure. In 1731 he left Germany and moved to Russia to work in the army as a military doctor and served in Crimea. In 1732 he wrote a biography of his teacher Frederik Ruysch. In 1738 he was appointed city physician in Moscow. From 1741 he worked as a professor of anatomy and surgery at St. Petersburg becoming an influential teacher. He wrote a book on the outbreak of plague in Ukraine in 1744. In 1757 he wrote Almagestum medicum. Schreiber sought to return to Germany but died in St. Petersburg.
