= The Night of Wishes =

1989 children's book by Michael Ende

The Night of Wishes: Or the Satanarchaeolidealcohellish Notion Potion
- Author: Michael Ende
- Original title: Der satanarchäolügenialkohöllische Wunschpunsch
- Language: German
- Genre: Fantasy
- Publication place: Germany
- Media type: Print

The Night of Wishes: Or the Satanarchaeolidealcohellish Notion Potion is a German fantasy book by the German children's book author Michael Ende that was first published in 1989 and awarded with the Swiss literary award "La vache qui lit" in 1990. The original German title was Der satanarchäolügenialkohöllische Wunschpunsch.

== Plot ==
At 5 pm on New Year's Eve (significantly called St. Sylvester's Day in Germany), evil sorcerer Beelzebub Preposteror is visited by Maledictus T. Maggot, an emissary of Preposteror's namesake and patron, the Minister of Pitch Darkness. Maggot informs Preposteror that he has failed to meet the terms of a contract that requires a certain number of evil deeds. Preposteror offers the excuse that the High Council of the Animals has sent the cat Maurizio as a spy, which has forced him to be more cautious in his work. Maggot threatens Preposteror with a "seizure" should he not fulfill his quota until midnight.

Preposteror joins forces with his aunt, the evil witch Tyrannia Vampirella, who has also been contacted by Maggot on behalf of her patron Mammon and has similarly been inconvenienced by the raven spy Jacob. Together, they try to brew the eponymous Notion Potion that can grant any wish to the drinker, hoping to fulfill their contracts in time. They are unconcerned with keeping their work secret from the animals because the potion grants wishes in reverse – e.g. if they wish someone good health, the person will become sick instead.

While the magicians follow the potion's long and complicated recipe, constantly getting in each other's way, Maurizio and Jacob wander the streets, searching for a way to stop the evil plan. As they reach the city cathedral, Jacob remembers overhearing a weakness of the potion: if it has not been fully drunk before the church bells ring at midnight, the potion will not reverse the wishes made on it, but instead grant them exactly as spoken. Maurizio, thrilled by this glimmer of hope, starts to climb the cathedral's clock tower in an attempt to ring the bells. Jacob soon realizes that only the true New Year's bell rings will work, but Maurizio continues to climb the tower in the freezing cold, and Jacob eventually follows him. Upon reaching the belfry, the two animals faint from exhaustion. When they wake up, they are surprised to find themselves facing Pope Sylvester I, who, as every year, has appeared from the hereafter to ring the bells. Due to existing outside time, St. Sylvester is able to prematurely give them a note of the midnight bell chimes; although it will only sound at midnight, it can retroactively ruin the potion if added to it.

Maurizio and Jacob travel at the speed of sound back to Preposteror's home thanks to the note, which they secretly drop in the recently finished potion. The magicians start wishing the world all the best with every sip of the potion, believing they are causing harm. By the time midnight approaches, they are both heavily inebriated and out of wishes to make, so they decide to have fun at their pets' expense. After wishing them "health", the two animals fully recover from their ordeal. The magicians are stunned, but too drunk to understand what has happened. As the raven and the cat flee the house, the magicians try to curse each other, but instead turn beautiful and kindly. They finally realize that the potion has granted all their wishes literally and struggle to make an evil wish with its last drops, but are now too good to wish harm on anyone. In a panic, they wish to turn back the way they were and pass out drunk.

After midnight, Maggot impounds the magicians' souls while Maurizio and Jacob watch the night sky, enthusiastically planning their future in the better world that Preposteror and Vampirella unwittingly brought into being.

== Characters ==
Note: Unless otherwise stated, the information on the figures refers to the hardcover edition published by Thienemann-Esslinger Verlag, 12th edition 2016.

- The evil sorcerer Beelzebub Preposteror (Beelzebub Irrwitzer) is 187 years old and thus relatively young for his peers. He is a tall, bald, gaunt-looking man with protruding ears, a hooked nose and a thin-lipped mouth that is shriveled "like a sun-dried apple." He wears a silk dressing gown in his favorite color, poison green. The magician is named after his patron, the devil Beelzebub, the minister of pitch darkness.
- The money witch Tyrannia Vampirella (Aunt Tyti, Tyrannja Vamperl) is almost 300 years old, but "still very active in her profession.” She is literally as wide as she is tall. Her visibly aged "pug face” is heavily made-up. She wears a sulfur-yellow evening dress with black stripes and an enormous amount of jewelry. Instead of a handbag, she carries a small safe with her. Her patron is Mammon, the Infernal Minister of Finance.
- The young three-colored tomcat Mauricio di Mauro (Maurizio di Mauro) is a spy of the "High Council of Animals". During his time with Preposteror, he has become rotund and lethargic and has neglected his mission. He initially let himself be deceived and thinks of Preposteror as a "benefactor of the animals". Although he is just an ordinary street cat, he dreams of being a singer from an old noble Neapolitan family.
- The old pessimistic raven Jacob Scribble (Jakob Krakel) is also a spy of the "High Council of the Animals", namely of Tyrannia Vampirella. He is rather battered, appearing like a big potato "... in which someone has stuck a few black feathers." He enlightens Maurizio about the true nature of Preposteror.
- Maledictus T. Maggot (Maledictus Made) is an official of the devil. He is dressed in black and wears a coat, hat and gloves. His face is pale, his eyes are colorless and lack lids.
- Every year the statue of Pope Sylvester I (Silvester I.) comes to life on its name day to ring the cathedral bells at midnight. He is a thin old man who wears an embroidered gold coat with a bishop's miter and crozier. He has bushy white eyebrows and his eyes are water blue.

== Title ==
German title read out

The word satanarchäolügenialkohöllisch is a portmanteau from the German words Satan, Anarchie (anarchy), Archäologie (archaeology), Lüge (lie), genial (ingenious), Alkohol (alcohol) and höllisch (hellish).

== Adaptations ==
- Wunschpunsch (2000-2002), animated series directed by Philippe Amador
