= John Schreiber (writer) =

American author, teacher, and theater director

John Schreiber (born 1954) is an American author, teacher, and theater director. He has taught for over 40 years in southern Minnesota, was a finalist for Minnesota Teacher of the Year in 2003, and has directed over 140 plays and musicals. In 2012, he was Minnesota's first Theater Educator of the Year.

== Biography ==
As an author, Schreiber is best known as the writer of the Ironwood County Chronicles, a series of novels that take place in southern Minnesota. Schreiber's Chronicles consist of: Hillcrest Journal (published 2002), Passing Through Paradise (2003 first edition), Life on the Fly (2005), and Catching the Stream (2015). The short story collection Tales from 2 A.M. (2004) also includes some stories based in the fictional Ironwood County.

The fictional Ironwood County is located between Steele County, Minnesota, Dodge County, Minnesota, and Olmsted County. Unlike other novels based in small towns, the Ironwood County series portrays small towns as realistic microcosms of humanity, not as idyllic, romantic locales nor as backwater societies.

In 2007, Schreiber published Heartstone, an epic fantasy that employs a fast-paced, cinematic writing style "with no transitions between scenes." The fantasy revolves around Derrick, a lame young man who discovers he has the power to unlock unlimited power through heartstone, and his struggle to maintain his "true beliefs."

In the fall of 2008, a second edition of Passing Through Paradise was released in both hardcover and paperback. This edition is recognizable by its red cover with a childlike crayon sketch. The second edition includes discussion questions for book clubs as well as a map of Paradise. The first edition has a yellow cover with a photograph of a railroad trestle in Kenyon, Minnesota.

He has also written two short plays, "I AM: the Jesus Incident" (included in Tales from 2 A.M.), a religious play that has been performed by numerous churches throughout the world, and "I Never Saw a Moor", a one-act play that explores the pain and alienation felt by those who have epilepsy.

The sequel to Heartstone entitled Heartstone: Under the Shadow was published in August, 2011 in both paperback and ebook formats. It centers around Derrick, ten years after the events recounted in Heartstone. His wife is kidnapped by the Shadow Empire and he must design a plan to rescue her without plunging his country into war.

In 2014 he released three shorter ebooks: "Galactic Pariah: the Legend of Methuselah Brown," "Me and Josh and Gideon," and "The New Jerusalem Poems and I AM: the Jesus Incident."

In 2015 to 2020, Schreiber published Catching the Stream, the sequel to Life on the Fly. It continues the adventures of protagonist Matthew Blake and includes many of the supporting characters from the previous Ironwood County novels. He also published several ebooks: The New Jerusalem Poems that includes the play 'I AM: the Jesus Incident'; and The Shape of the Hero in Modern Fantasy.

Since then he has published The Highly Irregulars series, since collected into two volumes, and the "After" series, starting with Wilderness Road (2025) and When Lanterns Die (planned 2026).

== Bibliography ==
=== Ironwood County novels ===
- Hillcrest Journal
- Passing Through Paradise
- Life on the Fly
- Catching the Stream
- Kindle Vella: On the Corner of Hope and Hell: My Secret Journal Dedicated to my (Dumb) Brother Who Killed Himself by Anonymous

=== Fantasy ===
- Heartstone
- Heartstone: Under the Shadow
- Tales from 2 A.M.

=== After series (also known as Wilderness Road Trilogy) ===
- Wilderness Road
- When Lanterns Die

=== Irregulars Series ===
• The Highly Irregulars: Their Collected Stories, Volumes 1 and 2

=== Kindle books ===
- Galactic Pariah: the Legend of Methuselah Brown
- The Shape of the Hero in Modern Epic Fantasy
- New Jerusalem Poems and 'I AM: the Jesus Incident
- Monsters in Paradise
- Me and Josh and Gideon
