= Mark Schreiber (writer) =

American writer (born 1960)

Mark Schreiber (born 1960 in Cincinnati, Ohio) is an American writer. He has written over forty books, mostly novels but also memoirs, essays and general science.

== Biography ==
Schreiber graduated high school at age fifteen and began writing full-time.

His seventh novel, Princes in Exile, was written when he was twenty and published by Beaufort Books in New York in 1983. It received the Silver Feather award in Germany, the Jury of Young Readers award in Austria and was shortlisted for the Austria Prize. It was published in ten countries and adapted into a film, produced by John Dunning and André Link.

In 2000 Schreiber met Olga Sidorova, a Russian solo trapezist then starring in Cirque du Soleil’s Saltimbanco. He wrote a book about her and other members in the cast, including Olympian Elena Grosheva, Alya Titarenko and Jesko von den Steinen.

His young adult novel Starcrossed was published by Flux and translated into French and Turkish.

His science book How to Build an Elephant was published as an app by SwagSoft in 2014. He has also published educational apps for children with Fluxtech.

His business book, Rebranding Branding: Branding for the New Millennium, co-written with Darren Taylor, was published by Clavier Press in 2017.

He has published numerous articles, including a My Turn essay in Newsweek in January 2008.

He has twice received the State of Ohio Individual Artists Fellowship.

Since 2015 Schreiber has been a digital nomad, living in Amsterdam, Singapore, Melbourne, Costa Rica and the United States.

== Selected works ==
- Princes in Exile. Stoddart Publishing, 1983
  - In German: Prinzen im Exil. Transl. Ulla Neckenauer. Editor Jungbrunnen, Vienna 1994
- Carnelian (2000)
- Dreams of the Solo Trapeze: Offstage with the Cirque du Soleil (2005)
- Starcrossed (2007)
- Pebble Beach (2007)
- How to Build an Elephant (2007)
