= Benjamin Schreiber (criminal) =

American murderer (1952 or 1953–2023)

- Born: Benjamin Edward Schreiber; 1952 or 1953
- Died: April 7, 2023 (aged 70); Fort Dodge, Iowa, US
- Known for: Claim that his sentence ended after he was resuscitated
- Status: Dead
- Conviction: First-degree murder
- Penalty: Life imprisonment

Details
- Victims: John Dale Terry
- Date: July 27, 1996
- Locations: Agency, Iowa, US
- Weapon: Axe handle (Note: While The Des Moines Register reported that Schreiber used a pickaxe handle, most other sources report an axe handle.)
- Date apprehended: July 30, 1996
- Imprisoned at: Iowa State Penitentiary

Benjamin Edward Schreiber (1952 or 1953 – April 7, 2023) was an American criminal who murdered John Dale Terry, a 39-year-old man, near Agency, Iowa, on July 27, 1996. While serving a life sentence at the Iowa State Penitentiary, he developed sepsis from severe kidney stones, requiring him to be resuscitated. He then unsuccessfully claimed that his life sentence ended as he had temporarily died.

Schreiber bludgeoned Terry with an axe handle at an abandoned trailer south of Agency; Evelyn Tangie, Terry's girlfriend, was also at the scene. He was arrested on July 30 and held at the Wapello County Jail. While he sought for his charges to be dropped, he was found guilty on August 22, 1997. While imprisoned at the Iowa State Penitentiary, Schreiber unsuccessfully appealed his sentence and filed a lawsuit alongside three other prisoners claiming that being required to give a blood sample for DNA profiling was unconstitutional as the law was passed after they were convicted; the Iowa Supreme Court ruled against them in 2003. He was sent to the University of Iowa Hospitals & Clinics on March 30, 2015, after developing kidney stones. Despite signing a do not resuscitate order, he received fluid resuscitation and his heart was restarted five times. He filed for post-conviction relief in April 2018, claiming that he had temporarily died. His request was dismissed by a district court and the Iowa Court of Appeals affirmed the dismissal on November 6, 2019. He died of natural causes at a hospital in Fort Dodge, Iowa, at the age of 70.

== Biography ==
Benjamin Edward Schreiber was born in 1952 or 1953. He lived in Ottumwa, Iowa, at the time of the murder of Terry.

On the night of July 27, 1996, Schreiber, who was then 43, went to an abandoned trailer south of Agency with Terry and Evelyn Tangie, Terry's girlfriend. Schreiber bludgeoned Terry with an axe handle and fled the scene with Tangie. Schreiber threw the axe handle from his car west of Agency; it was found the next day with blood and hair on it. Terry's body was found the next morning, and Schreiber was arrested at his house at 11:09 p.m. CDT on July 30.

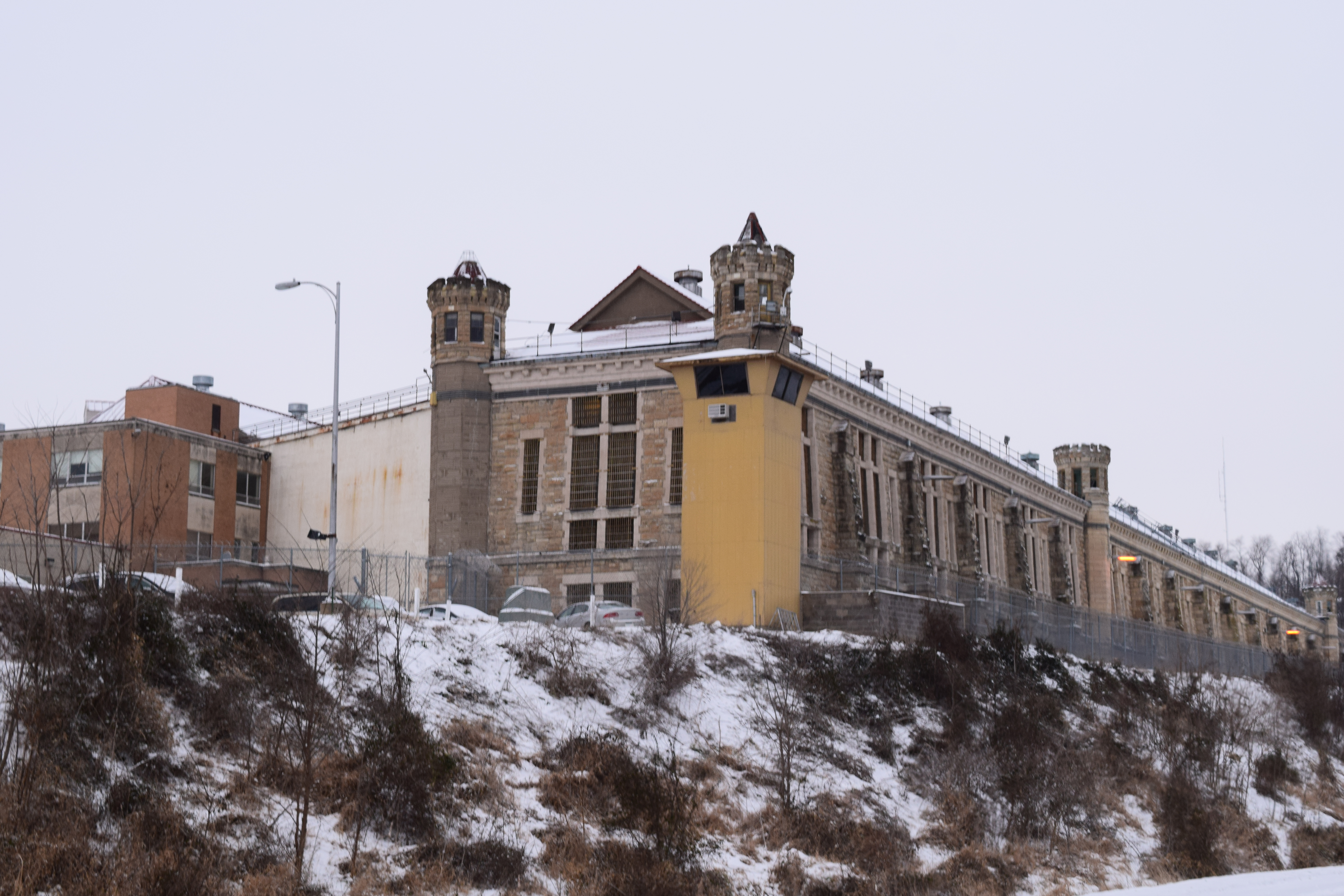
Schreiber served his sentence at the Iowa State Penitentiary.

Schreiber was held at the Wapello County Jail with a US$250,000 bond (equivalent to $460,000 in 2024); a preliminary hearing was set for August 7. He pleaded his innocence on July 31. Tangie was also charged and arrested with a $250,000 bond in March 1997; she was set to be arraigned on March 31. Schreiber sought for his charges to be dismissed due to insufficient evidence; a hearing was scheduled for August 4, 1997, 14 days before his trial was set to begin. Despite his attempts, he was convicted of first-degree murder on August 22, after roughly two hours of deliberation. His sentencing was set for October 6, while Tangie's trial was set for November. He was sentenced to life in prison without the possibility of parole. While Tangie was convicted of second-degree murder, her conviction was overturned and a retrial was ordered by the Iowa Court of Appeals on February 9, 2000, saying that Charles Denham, a third party, relaying Schreiber's statements violated the Confrontation Clause of the Sixth Amendment to the United States Constitution.

Schreiber appealed his sentence, claiming that he was unable to show in the trial that Terry had a criminal history and he could have been killed by someone else while committing a crime. The Iowa Court of Appeals upheld his conviction on March 31, 1999, saying that Terry's activities were irrelevant to the case and evidence against Schreiber was strong.

In 2000, while imprisoned at the Iowa State Penitentiary, Schreiber filed a lawsuit alongside three other prisoners – Gentric Hicks, Bobby Smith, and Archie Bear – claiming that a 1999 law requiring felons to give a blood sample for DNA profiling was unconstitutional because they were not sentenced to the profiling; the law was passed after their convictions. The Iowa Supreme Court ruled against the prisoners on July 16, 2003, saying that the law did not further punish them but was a deterrent from future crimes. Attorney general Tom Miller supported the ruling.

Schreiber died of natural causes around 10:55 p.m. CDT on April 7, 2023, at a UnityPoint Health center in Fort Dodge, Iowa. He was 70 years old.

== Disease and resuscitation ==
Schreiber is either alive, in which case he must remain in prison, or he is dead, in which case this appeal is moot. We conclude [the law] requires Schreiber to stay in prison for the rest of his natural life, regardless of whether he was resuscitated against his wishes in 2015.

— Amanda Potterfield in the Court of Appeals opinion against Schreiber

External documents
- Court of Appeals opinion

On March 30, 2015, Schreiber was sent from the Iowa State Penitentiary to the University of Iowa Hospitals & Clinics unconscious (Note: While The New York Times reported that Schreiber fell unconscious at the hospital, Oxygen and CNN reported he lost consciousness at the prison; The Des Moines Register reported that he lost consciousness "by the time he arrived at the hospital".) after experiencing seizures and a fever; he developed sepsis from severe kidney stones. Despite signing a do not resuscitate order, which his brother confirmed to the hospital, his heart was restarted five times and he received intravenous fluid resuscitation.

Schreiber requested post-conviction relief in April 2018, claiming that as he temporarily died, his life sentence had ended. A district court in Wapello County dismissed Schreiber's request and the Iowa Court of Appeals affirmed the district court dismissal on November 6, 2019. In the Court of Appeals opinion, judge Amanda Potterfield described Schreiber's claim as "unpersuasive and without merit" and said that his sentence did not end until a medical examiner declared him dead. She also said that the court does "not believe the legislature intended this provision [...] to set criminal defendants free whenever medical procedures during their incarceration lead to their resuscitation by medical professionals". Schreiber also claimed that his right to due process was violated when the hospital ignored his do not resuscitate order; neither court considered this claim. His appeal was compared to that of Jerry Rosenberg, a New York City murderer who unsuccessfully argued that his life sentence ended when his heart stopped during surgery.
