= Lionheart =

Lionheart, Lion Heart, Lionsheart, Lionhearts or Lion's Heart may refer to:

== People ==
- Richard the Lionheart, a name for Richard I of England
- Dan Wheldon (1978–2011), race car driver who was nicknamed "Lionheart"
- Lion-Heart, nickname of English professional kickboxer Abdul Ali (born 1969), also known as Ali Jacko
- Lionheart, nickname of Anthony Smith (born 1988), a mixed martial artist
- Lionheart, a former ringname of professional wrestler Chris Jericho
- Lionheart (UK wrestler) (1982–2019), ring name of British professional wrestler Adrian McCallum

== Music ==
- Lionheart (British band), a British rock band
- Lionheart (American band), an American hardcore band
- Lionsheart, a British heavy metal band
- Lionheart Music Group, a Swedish record label

=== Albums ===
- Lion Heart (album), by South Korean girl group Girls' Generation, 2015
- Lionheart (Kate Bush album), 1978
- Lionheart (Saxon album), 2004
- Lionheart (Serenity album), 2017
- Lionhearts, an album by Maddy Prior, 2003
- Lionheart, an album by Noel Richards, 1989

=== Songs ===
- "Lionheart", by Battle Beast on their 2015 album Unholy Savior
- "Lionheart", by Blind Guardian on their 2006 album A Twist in the Myth
- "Lionheart", by Bury Tomorrow on their 2012 album The Union of Crowns
- "Lionheart", by Demi Lovato on her 2015 album Confident
- "Lionheart", by Lorna Shore on their 2025 album I Feel the Everblack Festering Within Me
- "Lionheart", by PUP on their self-titled 2013 album PUP
- "Lionheart", by War of Ages on their 2014 album Supreme Chaos
- "Lionheart (Fearless)", by Joel Corry and Tom Grennan 2022
- "Lion Heart" (song), by Girls' Generation
- "Lion Heart", by Krokus on their 1995 album To Rock or Not to Be
- "lionheart (the real me)", by Billlie on their 2023 album The Billage of Perception: Chapter Three

== Film and television ==
- Heart of a Lion, a 2013 Finnish film
- Lionheart (1968 film), directed by Michael Forlong
- Lionheart (1987 film), directed by Franklin J. Schaffner
- Lionheart (1990 film), starring Jean-Claude Van Damme
- Lionheart (2016 film), an American boxing film short
- Lionheart (2018 film), a Nigerian feature film directed by Genevieve Nnaji
- The Lionhearts, 1998 American animated series
- Lion's Heart, a 1972 Hong Kong film
- Lion.Hearts, a 2009 Chinese language TV series
- "Lionheart", the first episode of Power Rangers Wild Force

== Literature ==
- Lionheart (Marvel Comics), a Marvel Comics character
- Lionheart, a DC Comics character in the "Bloodlines" crossover
- Lionheart, a comic serial by Tom Stazer, featured in Fantagraphics Books' Critters series
- Lionheart, a 1965 adventure novel by Alexander Fullerton
- Lionheart, a historical novel by American author Sharon Kay Penman about the life of Richard I of England

== Video games ==
- Lionheart (video game), a 1993 platform-genre video game
- Lionheart: Legacy of the Crusader, a 2003 video game
- Lionheart: Kings' Crusade, a 2010 video game

== Other uses ==
- Lionheart Radio, a community radio station
- Lionheart (yacht), a yacht owned by Sir Philip Green
- Griffon Lionheart, an airplane modeled after the Beechcraft Staggerwing
- Lisa Lionheart, a fictional fashion doll and the subject of "Lisa vs. Malibu Stacy", a 1994 episode of The Simpsons
- Lion's Heart (organization), a teen-based volunteer program headquartered in California
- Lionheart (supplement), a 1987 role-playing supplement
- Lionheart, Heroic Warrior from Supernaturals (toy line)

== See also ==
- The Brothers Lionheart, a fantasy novel for children by Astrid Lindgren
- "Heart of a Lion", a 1986 song released on the 2004 album Metalogy by Judas Priest
- Sher Dil (disambiguation)
