= No Orchids for Miss Blandish =

No Orchids for Miss Blandish may refer to:

- No Orchids for Miss Blandish (novel), a 1939 crime novel
- No Orchids for Miss Blandish (play), a 1943 British stage adaptation
- No Orchids for Miss Blandish (film), a 1948 British film adaptation
