= The Flesh of the Orchid =

The Flesh of the Orchid may refer to:

- The Flesh of the Orchid (novel), a 1948 novel by James Hadley Chase
- La Chair de l'orchidée, a 1975 film, adapted from the novel
