= GingaMingaYo (The Strange World) =

- Japanese version standard cover

Single by Billlie

from the EP The Collective Soul and Unconscious: Chapter One
- Language: Korean
- B-side: "Everybody's Got a Secret" (Japanese)
- Released: February 23, 2022
- Genre: K-pop
- Length: 3:35
- Label: Mystic Story; Kakao
- Composers: Hyuk Shin (153CreatorsClub); MRey (153CreatorsClub); Ashley Alisha (153/Joombas); Le'mon (153/Joombas)
- Lyricist: Le'mon
- Producer: Han Peacedelic Jungsu

Billlie singles chronology
"Snowy Night" (2021)	"GingaMingaYo (The Strange World)" (2022)	"Patbingsu" (2022)

Music video
- "GingaMingaYo (The Strange World)" on YouTube

"GingaMingaYo (The Strange World)" title card

"GingaMingaYo (The Strange World)" (from Korean: 긴가민가요; RR: Gingamingayo, meaning "uncertain") is a song recorded by South Korean girl group Billlie for their second extended play The Collective Soul and Unconscious: Chapter One. It was released as the lead single by Mystic Story on February 23, 2022. It was written by Le'mon and Hyuk Shin, MRey, Ashley Alisha and Le'mon of 153/Joombas worked on composing while Han Peacedelic Jungsu produced the song. "GingaMingaYo" is a pop song with elements of bass house. Lyrically, It contains the questions and emotions that one asks oneself during the process of becoming an adult. The Japanese version was released on May 17, 2023, as the group's debut single in Japan.

== Composition and lyrics ==
The title track "GingaMingaYo (The Strange World)" was written by Lemon, composed by Hyuk Shin (153CreatorsClub), MRey (153CreatorsClub), Ashley Alisha (153/Joombas), Le'mon (153/Joombas) and was arranged by MRay (153/Joombas). "Ginga minga" is a Korean expression meaning uncertainty. As the title implies, the song is about being confused with the changes in life as one grows up. The title which is written in Korean and English is composed in the key of B flat minor, with a tempo of 122 beats per minute with a running time of 3 minutes and 35 seconds.

== Background and reception ==
"GingaMingaYo" was first announced on 11 February 2022, through a track list image released by Mystic Story on different social media platforms. It was first heard on 21 February through the highlight medley and the official track was released alongside the EP on 23 February 2022, accompanied by its music video uploaded on YouTube by Mystic Story.

Many critics observed "GingaMingaYo" to have more of a lighter, more whimsical feel with catchy deep house beats that's giving a playful and fun mood compared to their debut song "Ring X Ring". Time noted down that Funky synths and Billlie’s animated chants propel the song, creating a fun number that piques a listener’s curiosity as much as it boosts their energy.

== Promotion ==
3 members were interviewed by The Korea Times to promote the album on February 23, 2022, following the cancellation of their media showcase. They subsequently premiered the song after 13 days of release on SBS MTV's The Show. The group also performed on M Countdown, Music Bank, Inkigayo, Show! Music Core, Show Champion and Simply Con-Tour.

== Music video ==
Prior to the release, a teaser was released and the music video was released on February 23, 2022. It was directed by Hong Wonki And Shim Jihyoung from Zanybros, where they portray the girls transcending from their everyday life to a strange world where they explore the deeper layers of their unconsciousness. This is the second time Zanybros has directed a music video for Billlie with the first one being for "Snowy Night".

== Commercial performance ==
"GingaMingaYo (The Strange World)" did not enter the Gaon Digital Chart, but appeared at number 123 on the component Download Chart and then went on to peak at 92 the following week. In Japan, the song debuted at number 6 on the Billboard Japan Heatseekers Songs Chart.

== Accolades ==
Mid-year lists
Publication	List	Rank	Ref.
Time	The Best K-pop Songs and Albums of 2022 So Far (Songs)	—N/a	
NME	The 15 best K-pop songs of 2022 – So Far	15	

Year-end lists
Publication	List	Rank	Ref.
Idology	Top 20 Songs of 2022	—N/a	

== Personnel ==
Credits are adopted from Melon.

=== Recording and management ===
- Recorded and digital edited at 153/Joombas Studio (Seoul, South Korea)
- Mixed at Studio89 and Glabudio Studio (Seoul, South Korea)
- Published by 153/Joombas Publishing, EKKO Music Rights (CTGA), EKKO Music Rights Europe (CTGA), JYP Publishing (KOMCA) and NuVibe Music

=== Personnel ===
- Billlie – vocals, background vocals
- Hyuk Shin (153CreatorsClub) – composition
- MRey (153CreatorsClub) – composition, arrangement
- Ashley Alisha (153/Joombas) – composition
- Le'mon (153/Joombas) – composition, lyrics
- Kim Jihyun – recording
- Mr.Panda – mixing
- Joe LaPorta – mixing

=== Visual credits ===
- Hong Wonki (Zanybros) – music video direction
- Shim Jihyoung (Zanybros) – music video direction
- Lia Kim (1Million Dance Studio) – choreography production
- Dohee (1Million Dance Studio) – choreography
- JJ (1Million Dance Studio) – choreography
- Yeji Kim (1Million Dance Studio) – choreography
- Amy Park (1Million Dance Studio) – choreography
- Renan (1Million Dance Studio) – choreography

== Charts ==
Chart performance for "GingaMingaYo (The Strange World)"
Chart (2022)	Peak position
Japan Heatseekers (Billboard Japan)	6
South Korea Download (Gaon)	92

Chart performance for "GingaMingaYo (The Strange World)" (Japanese ver.)
Chart (2023)	Peak position
Japan (Oricon)	4
Japan Combined Singles (Oricon)	24
Japan Top Singles Sales (Billboard Japan)	7

== Release history ==
Release history for "GingaMingaYo (The Strange World)"
Region	Date	Format	Version	Label
Various	February 23, 2022	Digital download; streaming	Original (Korean)	Mystic Story; Kakao
Various	May 17, 2023	Digital download; streaming	Japanese	Victor
Japan	May 17, 2023	CD single	Japanese	Victor
