= The Billage of Perception: Chapter Two =

- Digital and Mane version cover

EP by Billlie
- Released: August 31, 2022
- Genres: K-pop; rock; R&B; dance
- Length: 19:40
- Language: Korean
- Labels: Mystic Story; Kakao

Billlie chronology
| The Collective Soul and Unconscious: Chapter One (2022) | The Billage of Perception: Chapter Two (2022) | The Billage of Perception: Chapter Three (2023) |

Singles from The Billage of Perception: Chapter Two
- 1. "Ring Ma Bell (What a Wonderful World)" Released: August 31, 2022

The Billage of Perception: Chapter Two is the third extended play by South Korean girl group Billlie. It was released on August 31, 2022, by Mystic Story and distributed by Kakao Entertainment.

== Background and release ==
On August 8, 2022, it was announced the group would be releasing a new installation to their The Billage Of Perception series. On August 16, it was announced that their third EP The Billage Of Perception: Chapter Two, featuring lead single "Ring Ma Bell (What a Wonderful World)", will be released on August 31. The physical album was opened for pre-orders in three versions as Lux, Mane, and Quies. The concept film for the EP titled The End of the World and the Awakening was released on August 25. The group then went on to release teaser clips for their B-side tracks, with "My B = The Birth of Emotion" and "Sun Palace (Stroop Effect)" released on August 26, "B'rave ~ A Song for Matilda" and "Mcguffins ~ Who's the Joker?" on August 27 and "Back 2 Where We Belong" on August 28, with the album officially released on August 31.

== Composition ==
The album has incorporated various genres such as hard rock, synth-pop, and pop-R&B. During the showcase, the group revealed that the storyline and the lyricism is connected to their debut EP, The Billage of Perception: Chapter One. The opening track, "My B = The Birth of Emotion", is a synth-pop number with a "psychedelic" synth phrase. The second and the pop-R&B track "B'rave ~ A Song for Matilda" is inspired by the 1988 novel Matilda written by Roald Dahl. The third and the title track "Ring Ma Bell (What a Wonderful World)" is a hard rock number that starts with a 70's crunchy overdrive guitar riff. "Sun Palace (Stroop Effect)" is a follow-up for "Moon Palace" from their second EP The Collective Soul and Unconscious: Chapter One. "Mcguffins ~ Who's the Joker?" is a dance-pop track that fusions latin trap and Chicago hip hop. "Back 2 Where We Belong" is a rock number that acts as a fan song.

== Promotion ==
On the afternoon of August 31, a showcase to commemorate the release was held at Yes24 Live Hall in Gwangjin-gu, Seoul.

== Commercial performance ==
According to the data released by South Korean Hanteo Charts, The Billage Of Perception: Chapter Two recorded 43,823 copies sold on its first day, marking a new career high for the group which was previously held by Track by Yoon: Patbingsu, which had around 34,000 first-day album sales.

== Track listing ==
The Billage of Perception: Chapter Two track listing
| No. | Title | Lyrics | Music | Arrangement | Length |
|---|---|---|---|---|---|
| 1. | "My B = The Birth of Emotion" | Llano | Mayu Wakisaka; Pdly; Yoon Jong-song (MonoTree) | Pdly; Yoon Jong-song (MonoTree) | 3:07 |
| 2. | "B'rave ~ A Song for Matilda" | Le'mon; Saay (SoulTriii) | Deez (SoulTriii); Yunsu (SoulTriii); Saay (SoulTriii) | Deez (SoulTriii); Yunsu (SoulTriii) | 3:37 |
| 3. | "Ring Ma Bell (What a Wonderful World)" | Llano | Sjoerd de Vries; Galeyn Tenhaeff; Catalina Schweighauser | Sjoerd de Vries | 3:26 |
| 4. | "Sun Palace (Stroop Effect)" | Le'mon | Mingtion; Emily Kim | Mingtion | 2:59 |
| 5. | "Mcguffins ~ Who's the Joker?" | Le'mon | Ryan S. Jhun; Anna Timgren; Mosin; Arcon | Ryan S. Jhun; Mosin; Arcon | 3:23 |
| 6. | "Back 2 Where We Belong" | Jiyun Choi (153/Joombas); Billlie | Kella Armitage; Riley Biederer; Max Weinik | Max Weinik | 3:06 |
| Total length: | | | | | 19:40 |

Notes

- "Ring Ma Bell (What a Wonderful World)" is stylized "RING ma Bell (what a wonderful world)"
- "Sun Palace (Stroop Effect)" is stylized "$UN palace (Stroop effect)"
- "my B = The Birth of Emotion" is stylized "my B = the Birth of emotion"
- "B'rave ~ A Song for Matilda" is stylized "B'rave ~ a song for Matilda"
- "Mcguffins ~ Who's the Joker?" is stylized "Mcguffins ~ who's the Joker?"
- "Back 2 Where We Belong" is stylized "B@ck 2 where we Belong"

== Credits and personnel ==
Credits adapted from Melon.

=== Recording and management ===
- Mixed at Studio89, Glab Studios, SoulTriii Lab Studio, Studio DDeepKick, WSound Studio and Alawn Music Studios
- Recorded at Studio89
- Mastered at Sterling Sound
- Published by MonoTree, EKKO Music Rights, Warner Chappell Music Holland BV, Sony/ATV Music Publishing, Marcan Entertainment, NuVibe Music, Musikade, Angels on My Shoulder Music, MRKW Publishing.

=== Personnel ===
- Billlie – vocals (all tracks), lyrics (track 6)
- Anna Timgren – composition (track 5)
- Arcon – composition, arrangement (track 5)
- Catalina Schweighauser – composition (track 3)
- Deez (SoulTriii) – composition, arrangement (track 4)
- Emily Kim – composition (track 4)
- Galeyn Tenhaeff – composition (track 3)
- Jiyun Choi (153/Joombas) – lyrics (track 6)
- Kella Armitage – composition (track 6)
- Le'mon – lyrics (tracks 3, 4, 5)
- Llano – lyrics (track 1, 3)
- Mayu Wakisaka – composition (track 1)
- Max Weinik – composition, arrangement (track 6)
- Mingtion – composition, arrangement (track 4)
- Mosin – composition, arrangement (track 5)
- Pdly – composition, arrangement (track 1)
- Riley Biederer – composition (track 6)
- Ryan S. Jhun – composition, arrangement (track 5)
- Saay (SoulTriii) – lyrics, composition (track 4)
- Sjoerd de Vries – composition, arrangement (track 3)
- Yoon Jong-song (MonoTree) – composition, arrangement (track 1)
- Yunsu (SoulTriii) – lyrics, composition (track 4)
- Jungsu Peacedelic Han – production
- Kim Ji-hyun – recording engineer
- Seo Yu-duk – recording engineer
- Shin Bong-won (Glob) – mixing engineer
- Junki Hyung-kwon – mixing engineer
- JoXuatrii – mixing engineer
- Yoon Won-kwon – mixing engineer
- Jo Jun-sung – mixing engineer
- Alawn – mixing engineer
- Kim Il-ho – mixing engineer
- Chris Gehringer – mastering

== Charts ==
=== Weekly charts ===
Weekly chart performance for The Billage of Perception: Chapter Two
| Chart (2022) | Peak position |
|---|---|
| Japanese Albums (Oricon) | 23 |
| South Korean Albums (Circle) | 3 |

=== Monthly charts ===
Monthly chart performance for The Billage of Perception: Chapter Two
| Chart (2022) | Peak position |
|---|---|
| South Korean Albums (Circle) | 17 |

== Release history ==
Release history and formats for The Billage of Perception: Chapter Two
| Region | Date | Format | Label |
|---|---|---|---|
| South Korea | August 31, 2022 | CD; digital download; streaming | Mystic Story; Kakao Entertainment |
| Various | August 31, 2022 | Digital download; streaming | Mystic Story; Kakao Entertainment |
