= The Collective Soul and Unconscious: Chapter One =

2022 EP by Billie

- Digital and Soul version cover

EP by Billlie
- Released: February 23, 2022
- Studio: Studio89
- Genres: Bass house; jazz; alternative R&B; post-trip hop; synth-pop
- Length: 15:13
- Languages: Korean; English
- Label: Mystic Story
- Producer: Han Peacedelic Jungsu

Billlie chronology
The Billage of Perception: Chapter One (2021)	The Collective Soul and Unconscious: Chapter One (2022)	The Collective Soul and Unconscious: Chapter One Original Soundtrack from "What Is Your B?" (2022)

Singles from The Collective Soul and Unconscious: Chapter One
- 1. "GingaMingaYo (The Strange World)" Released: February 23, 2022

The Collective Soul and Unconscious: Chapter One (stylized in lower-case) is the second EP by South Korean girl group Billlie. It was released on February 23, 2022, by Mystic Story and distributed by Kakao Entertainment. The physical album is available in two versions as Soul and Unconscious.The EP is produced by Han Peacedelic Jungsu and is primarily a pop record, with bass house, jazz, alternative R&B, post-trip hop, and synth-pop influences.

== Background and release ==
On January 27, 2022, Mystic Story confirmed all the reports that Billlie is preparing for a new and a speedy release, slated for a late-February release. A teaser posted on February 11 revealed the EP and the lead single "GingaMingaYo" would be released on February 23. The album was officially released on 23 February. It was scheduled to have a showcase on the day of the release but since 3 members, namely Siyoon, Haram, and Tsuki was diagnosed with COVID-19, the showcase was cancelled.

== Composition ==
The group's sophomore album is primarily a pop record with influences of bass house, jazz, alternative R&B, post-trip hop and synth-pop. The EP is 15 minutes and 13 seconds and features 5 songs. Many critics observed that has a lighter, more whimsical feel with catchy deep house beats rather than their debut EP The Billage of Perception: Chapter One. One of the members of the group, Suhyeon, stated to The Korea Times that "In our debut track, we mostly focused on revealing our everyday life in a mysterious village," Suhyeon explained. "In our second release 'Snowy Night' that dropped in December, we offered a glimpse into our unconscious world. And this time, we will have people explore the deeper layers of our unconsciousness."

=== Songs ===
The lead single "GingaMingaYo (The Strange World)" was described as "containing the questions and emotions that he asks himself during the process of becoming an adult." The music video was directed by Zanybros. "GingaMingaYo" was composed in the key of B minor, with a tempo of 122 beats per minute. Other tracks include, "a sign ~ anonymous", broken beat style Jazz track, "overlap (1/1)", an alternative R&B track, "Moon Palace" (stylized as M◐◑N palace) a post-trip hop track and "Believe", a synth-pop track.

== Commercial performance ==
The Collective Soul and Unconscious: Chapter One debuted at number 5 on Gaon Album Chart in the chart issue dated February 20–26, 2022; on the monthly chart, the album debuted at number 20 in the chart issue for February 2022 with 29,966 copies sold. It has then sold 88,763 copies. It peaked at number eighteen on Japanese Oricon Weekly Album Charts, selling 2,681 copies in Japan.

== Track listing ==
The Collective Soul and Unconscious: Chapter One track listing
No.	Title	Lyrics	Music	Arrangement	Length
1.	"GingaMingaYo (The Strange World)"	Le'mon (153/Joombas)	Hyuk Shin (153/Joombas); Mrey (153/Joombas); Ashley Alisha (153/Joombas); Le'mon (153/Joombas)	Mrey (153/Joombas)	3:35
2.	"A Sign ~ Anonymous"	Le'mon	MinGtion; Mayu Wakisaka	MinGtion	3:09
3.	"Overlap (1/1)"	Le'mon	MinGtion; Theresia Svensson; Matilda Frommegard	MinGtion	2:50
4.	"Moon Palace"	Jo Jung-seo (153/Joombas)	MinGtion; Farida Benounis; Rasmus Thallaug	MinGtion	2:24
5.	"Believe"	Jang Ji-eun; Lim Kwang-kyun; 16; Siyoon; Tsuki; Sheon; Suhyeon; Haram; Moon Sua; Haruna	Lee Woo-min "Collapsedone"; Justin Reinstein	Lee W.; Reinstein	3:13
Total length:					15:13

Notes

- "Moon Palace" is stylized as "M◐◑N palace".

== Charts ==
=== Weekly charts ===
Weekly chart performance for The Collective Soul and Unconscious : chapter one
Chart (2022)	Peak position
South Korean Albums (Gaon)	5
Japanese Albums (Oricon)	18

=== Monthly charts ===
Monthly chart performance for The Collective Soul and Unconscious : chapter one
Chart (2022)	Peak position
South Korean Albums (Gaon)	20

== Accolades ==
Mid-year lists
Critic/Publication	List	Work	Rank	Ref.
Time	The Best K-pop Songs and Albums of 2022 So Far (Songs)	"GingaMingaYo (the strange world)"	—N/a	

== Certification and sales ==
Sales for The Collective Soul and Unconscious: Chapter One
Region	Certification	Certified units/sales
South Korea	—	85,858

== The Collective Soul and Unconscious: Chapter One Original Soundtrack from "What Is Your B?" ==
The Collective Soul and Unconscious: Chapter One Original Soundtrack from "What Is Your B?"

Soundtrack album for "What is Your B" by Billlie
- Released: March 1, 2022
- Length: 17:43
- Label: Mystic Story
- Producer: Han Peacedelic Jungsu

Billlie chronology
The Collective Soul and Unconscious: Chapter One (2022)	The Collective Soul and Unconscious: Chapter One Original Soundtrack from "What Is Your B?" (2022)	The Billage of Perception: Chapter Two (2022)

The Collective Soul and Unconscious: Chapter One Original Soundtrack from "What Is Your B?" is the first soundtrack album by Billlie. It was released on March 1, 2022, with "A Sign ~ Overture to Billlie" serving as the album's lead single.

The album includes the original soundtracks for the documentary film "What Is Your B?" that accompanied the EP The Collective Soul and Unconscious: Chapter One. The jazz, alternative, R&B, trip-hop, synth pop album was made available for download and streaming.

=== Track listing ===
The Collective Soul and Unconscious: Chapter One Original Soundtrack from "What Is Your B? track listing
No.	Title	Music	Arrangement	Length
1.	"Prologue ~ 1/1"	MinGtion; Theresia Svensson; Matilda Frommegård	Jeong Dong-hwan	0:33
2.	"The Rumor ~ Whatchamacallit"	Jeong	Jeong	1:12
3.	"Flipping a Coin" (instrumental version)	Alexander Karlsson (JeL); Alexej Viktorovitch (JeL); Bobii Lewis; Cazzi Opeia; Ellen Berg	JeL	3:15
4.	"A Sign ~ Overture to Billlie"	MinGtion; Mayu Wakisaka	Jeong	1:41
5.	"Everybody's Got a Secret" (instrumental version)	C-Young; Anna Timgren	C-Young	3:02
6.	"Moon Palace ~ The Invitation"	MinGtion; Farida Benounis; Rasmus Thallaug	Jeong	2:37
7.	"Welcome to the Strange World ~ GGMGY"	Hyuk Shin (153/Joombas); Mrey (153/Joombas); Ashley Alisha (153/Joombas); Le'mon (153/Joombas)	Jeong	1:15
8.	"Moon in the Fog"	MinGtion; Benounis; Thallaug	Jeong	2:16
9.	"Epilogue ~ Reprise"	MinGtion; Svensson; Frommegård	Jeong	1:14
10.	"A Sign ~ Overture to Billlie Reprise"	MinGtion; Wakisaka	Jeong	0:38
Total length:				17:43

Notes

- "Flipping a Coin" is stylized as "flipp!ng a coin".
- "Everybody's Got a Secret" is stylized as "everybody's got a $ECRET"
- "Moon in the Fog" is stylized as "M◐◑N in the fog"

== Credits and personnel ==
Credits adapted from NetEase Music

Recording and management

- Recorded and digitally edited at 153/Joombas Studio (Seoul, South Korea)
- Mixed at Studio89 and Glabudio Studio (Seoul, South Korea)
- Published by 153/Joombas Publishing, EKKO Music Rights (CTGA), EKKO Music Rights Europe (CTGA), JYP Publishing (KOMCA) and NuVibe Music

Personnel

- Billlie – writing (track 5), vocals, background vocals (all tracks)
- Hyuk Shin (153/Joombas) – music (track 1)
- Ashley Alisha (153/Joombas) – music (track 1)
- Le'mon (153/Joomba) – writing (tracks 1,2,3), music (track 1)
- Jo Jung-seo – writing (track 4)
- Jang Ji-eun – writing (track 5)
- Lim Kwang-kyun – writing (track 5)
- 16 – writing (track 5)
- MRey (153/Joombas) – arrangement and music (track 1)
- MinGtion – music and arrangement (tracks 2,3,4)
- Mayu Wakisaka – music (track 2)
- Theresia Svensson – music (track 3)
- Matilda Frommegard – music (track 3)
- Farida Benounis – music (track 4)
- Rasmus Thallaug – music (track 4)
- Lee Woo-min "collapsedone" – music and arrangement (track 5)
- Justin Reinstein – music and arrangement (track 5)
- Mystic Story, Yoon Jong-shin, Cho Young-chul – executive production
- Han Peacedelic Jungsu – production
- Kim Jihyun – recording
- Mr.Panda - mixing
- Joe LaPorta - mixing
- Jo Junsung - mixing
- Kim Ilho - mixing
- Shin Bongwon – mixing

Visual Credits

- Hong Wonki of Zanybros - music video direction
- Shim Jihyoung of Zanybros - music video direction
- Lia Kim (1Million Dance Studio) - choreography production
- Dohee (1Million Dance Studio) - choreography
- JJ (1Million Dance Studio) - choreography
- Yeji Kim (1Million Dance Studio) - choreography
- Amy Park (1Million Dance Studio) - choreography
- Renan (1Million Dance Studio) - choreography
- Shin Sunhye of CO-OP, Park Jinho, Song Jongsuk of studio BoB – photography
- WOOK of Studio VV – cover artwork
- Ko Yoon of deep.wide – package artwork and design

== Release history ==
Release history for The Collective Soul and Unconscious: Chapter One
Region	Date	Format	Label
South Korea	February 23, 2022	CD	Mystic Story; Kakao
Various	February 23, 2022	Digital download; streaming	Mystic Story; Kakao
