= Ring Ma Bell (What a Wonderful World) =

Single by Billlie

from the EP The Billage of Perception: Chapter Two
- Language: Korean
- Released: August 31, 2022
- Genre: Hard rock
- Length: 3:26
- Label: Mystic Story; Kakao
- Composers: Sjoerd de Vries; Galeyn Tenhaeff; Catalina Schweighauser
- Lyricist: Llano

Billlie singles chronology
| "Patbingsu" (2022) | "Ring Ma Bell (What a Wonderful World)" (2022) | "Eunoia" (2023) |

Music video
- "Ring Ma Bell (What a Wonderful World)" on YouTube

"Ring Ma Bell (What a Wonderful World)" (stylized as RING ma Bell (what a wonderful world)) is a song recorded by South Korean girl group Billlie for their third extended play The Billage of Perception: Chapter Two. It was released as the lead single by Mystic Story on August 31, 2022. It was written by Llano, composed by Sjoerd de Vries, Galeyn Tenhaeff, Catalina Schweighauser while Sjeord also worked on arranging.

== Composition and lyrics ==
The title song "Ring Ma Bell (What a Wonderful World)" is a hard rock number that starts with a 70's crunchy overdrive guitar riff. The title track was written by Llano, composed by Sjoerd de Vries, Galeyn Tenhaeff, Catalina Schweighauser while Sjeord also worked on arranging. It is written in Korean and English and is composed in the key of F minor, with a tempo of 137 beats per minute with a running time of 3 minutes and 26 seconds.

== Background and release ==
The track was first announced on August 16, 2022, through a track list image released by Mystic Story on different social media platforms. It was first heard on August 30 through a spoiler clip, and the official track was released alongside the EP on August 31, 2022, accompanied by its music video uploaded on YouTube by Mystic Story.

== Personnel ==
Credits adapted from Melon.

- Sjoerd de Vries – composition, arrangement
- Galeyn Tenhaeff – composition
- Catalina Schweighauser – composition
- Le'mon – lyrics
- Jungsu Peacedelic Han – production
- Kim Ji-hyun – recording engineer
- Seo Yu-duk – recording engineer
- Shin Bong-won (Glob) – mixing engineer
- Junki Hyung-kwon – mixing engineer
- Jun-sung – mixing engineer
- Chris Gehringer – mastering

== Charts ==
Chart performance for "Ring Ma Bell (What a Wonderful World)"
| Chart (2022) | Peak position |
|---|---|
| South Korea Download (Circle) | 32 |

== Release history ==
Release history for "Ring Ma Bell (What a Wonderful World)"
| Region | Format | Label |
|---|---|---|
| Various | Digital download; streaming | Mystic Story; Kakao |
