= Angela Morant =

British actress (1941–2026)

- Born: 15 January 1941; Warwickshire, England
- Died: 3 June 2026 (aged 85); London
- Occupation: Actress
- Years active: 1963–2004
- Notable work: I, Claudius
- Spouse: Ben Kingsley (m. 1966; div. 1976)
- Children: 2
- Relatives: Richard Morant (brother); Bill Travers (uncle); Linden Travers (aunt); Penelope Wilton (cousin)

Angela Morant (15 January 1941 – 3 June 2026) was an English actress best known for playing Octavia Minor in the 1976 BBC television adaptation of I, Claudius and Barbara Harrison in the soap opera Brookside.

== Life and career ==
Angela Morant attended Chipping Campden Grammar School. Her brother was actor Richard Morant. She was a niece of actors Bill and Linden Travers, and a cousin of actress Penelope Wilton and Susan Travers.

Her other television credits include A.D., Dixon of Dock Green, Callan, Inspector Morse, Bergerac and The Bill. She was also featured in the Lord Peter Wimsey series Have His Carcase alongside her brother, who played Lord Peter's valet Bunter.

Her film roles include the lead in the 1979 film Victims.

She was the first wife of actor Ben Kingsley, with whom she had two children.

Morant died on 3 June 2026.
