= Raising the Roof =

1972 children's comedy film by Michael Forlong

- Opening titles
- Directed by: Michael Forlong
- Written by: Michael Forlong
- Based on: Norman Taylor story
- Produced by: Michael Forlong
- Starring: Michael Gould; Patricia Davis; Ian Allis
- Cinematography: Mark McDonald
- Edited by: Frederick Ives
- Music by: Cyril Stapleton
- Production company: Michael Forlong Productions Limited
- Distributed by: Children's Film Foundation
- Release date: 1972
- Running time: 54 minutes
- Country: United Kingdom
- Language: English

Raising the Roof is a 1972 British children's comedy film directed by Michael Forlong and featuring Michael Gould, Patricia Davis, Roy Kinnear, David Lodge and Patricia Hayes. It was written by Forlong based on a story by Norman Taylor.

== Synopsis ==
An unusual pet competition is being held at a local cinema's Saturday matinee.

== Cast ==
- Michael Gould as Jack
- Patricia Davis as Jill
- Ian Allis as Clyde Burke
- Kay Skinner as Bonnie Burke
- Michael McVey as Rod
- Roy Kinnear as Dad Burke
- David Lodge as Manager
- Barrie Gosney as Robbins
- Jean Moran as Mrs. Robbins
- Patricia Hayes as Aunt Maud
- Tutte Lemkow as Alf
- Robertson Hare as old gent
- John Russell as himself, The Duke of Bedford

== Production ==
Sponsored by the Children's Film Foundation, the film was classified as "universal" suitable for audiences aged four years and over.

== Reception ==
The Monthly Film Bulletin wrote: "The bright idea of using a children's cinema matinee (the setting in this case is the ABC at Walton-on-Thames) as background for the framing sequences of a children's film is here matched by some equally bright slapstick scenes involving wet paint, custard pies and hose-pipes, and by the novel idea of depicting the young villains as a send-up gangster and moll. Kay Skinner is as engaging as ever in the role of Bonnie, while Tutte Lemkow's elephant trainer and Patricia Hayes' Aunt Maud stand out above some generally enjoyable performances from the adult members of the cast. The locations are ingeniously chosen, with the Duke of Bedford making a personal appearance in a sequence at Woburn Abbey; and Cyril Stapleton's catchy theme music helps put the final polish on what, despite some rather sibilant dialogue recording, is none the less an excellent children's film from Michael Forlong, the director/producer of the popular Lionheart."
