= Eunoia =

Component of rhetoric

In rhetoric, eunoia (Ancient Greek: εὔνοιᾰ, romanized: eúnoia, lit. 'well mind; beautiful thinking') is the good will that speakers cultivate between themselves and their audiences, a condition of receptivity. In Book VIII of the Nicomachean Ethics, Aristotle uses the term to refer to the kind and benevolent feelings of good will a spouse has which form the basis for the ethical foundation of human life. Cicero translates εὔνοιᾰ with the Latin word benevolentia.

It is also a rarely used medical term referring to a state of normal mental health. Eunoia is the shortest English word containing all five main vowel graphemes.

== In popular culture ==
- Eunoia is a work by poet Christian Bök consisting of five chapters, each one using only one vowel.
- In the science-fiction television series Earth: Final Conflict, Eunoia is the name of the native language of the Taelon race. Christian Bök was a consultant on that series and helped develop the language.
- The debut album of math rock band Invalids.
- In December 2015, the Ministry of Education in Singapore unveiled the name of a new junior College set to open in 2017, Eunoia Junior College. The unfamiliar name generated significant buzz in the Singapore community when it was first announced, including memes referencing Singlish homophones.
- Eunoia Technologies is the name of the firm Christopher Wylie founded after leaving Cambridge Analytica
- In electronic dance music, Eunoia is a song by wave/phonk artist KTrek (2020).
- In classical music, Eunoia is a piano composition by Juan María Solare in the key of C Major (2021)
- In 2023, South Korean group Billlie released the album The Billage of Perception: Chapter Three featuring the lead single "Eunoia"
- In 2024, Japanese band Envy announced the release of their 8th album, 'Eunoia'.

== See also ==
- Iouea, a similarly short word with all the vowels.
