= The Grissom Gang =

1971 film by Robert Aldrich

- DVD cover
- Directed by: Robert Aldrich
- Written by: Leon Griffiths
- Based on: No Orchids for Miss Blandish (1939 novel) by James Hadley Chase
- Produced by: Robert Aldrich
- Starring: Kim Darby; Scott Wilson; Tony Musante; Robert Lansing; Irene Dailey; Connie Stevens
- Cinematography: Joseph Biroc
- Edited by: Michael Luciano
- Music by: Gerald Fried
- Production companies: ABC Pictures; The Associates & Aldrich Company
- Distributed by: Cinerama Releasing Corporation
- Release date: May 29, 1971
- Running time: 128 minutes
- Country: United States
- Language: English
- Budget: $3 million
- Box office: $590,000

The Grissom Gang is a 1971 American neo-noir film directed and produced by Robert Aldrich, from a screenplay by Leon Griffiths, based on the 1939 novel No Orchids for Miss Blandish by British author James Hadley Chase. It stars Kim Darby, Scott Wilson, Tony Musante, Robert Lansing, Irene Dailey and Connie Stevens. Set in early-1930s Missouri, the film is about a heiress (Darby) who is kidnapped for ransom by the titular gang, whose unstable leader (Wilson) falls in love with her.

This was the second film adaptation of Chase's novel, following the 1948 British film. It was released by Cinerama Releasing Corporation on May 29, 1971.

== Plot ==
In 1931, outside Kansas City, Missouri, wealthy heiress Barbara Blandish is robbed by three small-time criminals. The trio panic after murdering her boyfriend and kidnap her. At their hideout, the trio are ambushed and killed by mobster Eddie Hagan, who happened to witness the crime, and the rest of the notorious Grissom Gang.

Barbara is held captive by the gang, including Slim Grissom, a mentally handicapped thug who falls in love with her. Ma Grissom, the gang's matriarchal boss, sends a ransom note to the girl's father, John P. Blandish, demanding a million dollars for her return. But she has no intention of returning Barbara, and the plan to kill her meets the disapproval of Ma's husband Doc.

Private investigator Dave Fenner is hired by Barbara's father as weeks go by. After at first insulting Slim as a "halfwit" and repelling his advances, Barbara realizes that the only thing keeping her alive is his desire for her, Slim vowing to kill any gang member who harms her. She reluctantly becomes Slim's lover.

Nightclub singer Anna Borg has no idea what became of her boyfriend, one of the kidnappers who got killed. She pulls a gun on Eddie, who lies that Anna's boyfriend ran off with another woman. Anna allows herself to be seduced by Eddie, who then murders two men with knowledge of the crime.

Months go by. Fenner, out of ideas, poses as a theatrical agent who can help Anna's singing career. He gets her talking about past criminal associations and learns where the missing girl might be. A furious Eddie kills Anna, then goes after Barbara only to have Slim stab him to death. Ma uses a machine gun to fight police and kills her husband Doc when he tries to surrender. Slim dies in a hail of bullets, but when Barbara weeps over him, her disgusted father walks away.

== Cast ==
- Kim Darby as Barbara Blandish
- Scott Wilson as Slim Grissom
- Tony Musante as Eddie Hagan
- Robert Lansing as Dave Fenner
- Irene Dailey as Gladys "Ma" Grissom
- Connie Stevens as Anna Borg
- Wesley Addy as John P. Blandish
- Don Keefer as Doc Grissom
- Joey Faye as Woppy
- Ralph Waite as Mace
- Hal Baylor as Chief McLaine
- Matt Clark as Ed Bailey
- Dots Johnson as Johnny Hitchins
- Dave Willock as Rocky
- Alex Wilson as Jerry McGowen

== Background ==
The film is the second film adaptation of the 1939 James Hadley Chase novel No Orchids for Miss Blandish, it was preceded by a 1948 British film starring Linden Travers and Jack La Rue.

Gene D. Phillips of Loyola University of Chicago wrote that "It is a matter of record that [the novel] No Orchids for Miss Blandish was heavily indebted to Sanctuary for its plot line." Therefore, he considers this film to be inspired by Sanctuary.

== Production ==
=== Development ===
The success of The Dirty Dozen led to Robert Aldrich signing a multi-picture contract with ABC Pictures. In May 1970 Martin Baum, president of ABC, announced Aldrich's company, Aldrich and Associates, would make The Grissom Gang, in June, at Aldrich's studios. Filming was pushed back to July.

Aldrich says he was partly inspired to make it by the fact it was set in the 1930 and would not be in as much danger of being dated. "You have to be terribly careful about not making a picture that will be affected by a change in the audience's framework of acceptance between the time you start and the time you finish", he said. "That's an enormous problem. Whatever you say today risks strongly going out of date in the fifteen month time-lag between the start of shooting and release."

In keeping with the original novel, the film was set in the Midwestern United States rather than New York City like the 1948 film.

=== Casting ===
Kim Darby said "every actress in town had been up for" her role, with Michelle Phillips and Barbara Hershey among the actresses who tested. Darby says "I really learned a lot from Mr. Aldrich during the shooting...and I think that it's a terrible picture. But working with Aldrich was the most enjoyable and funny time I ever had. There was nothing like it."

Scott Wilson had been offered a lot of roles as murderers after starring in In Cold Blood and turned them down. He accepted the part of Slim Grissom because he "was much more than just a killer. And there's a love story involved." (Bruce Dern had tested unsuccessfully for the part.)

Aldrich later said ABC insisted on certain people being cast.

The cast had two weeks of rehearsal. Wilson called Aldrich "amazing. He's in such control but he's so easy."

=== Filming ===
"I don't think Mr. Aldrich ever even referenced the novel while we were shooting", said Darby. "At that time, I had thought that we were working off of an original screenplay."

The film originally ended with Blandish committing suicide by jumping in the river, similar to her fate in the original novel. After test screenings, this ending was changed as it was felt unnecessary because "her life was lost and useless anyway" according to Aldrich.

Filming took place in California in Modesto, Placerville, and Sutter Creek as well as at Aldrich's studios in Los Angeles.

== Release ==
"I think it's a good picture", said Aldrich shortly before the film came out. "It's a personal story; but, yes, it has quite a bit of violence. Grissom Gang may or may not make money. It's not a commercially-oriented picture. It won't make money for us because it's cross-collateralized back against our lawsuit with ABC." (The lawsuit he was referring to involved ABC cancelling a proposed Western Aldrich wanted to make called Rebellion.)

=== Home media ===
The Grissom Gang was released to Region 1 DVD via Anchor Bay Entertainment on October 21, 2000. A second DVD became available from MGM Home Entertainment on November 2, 2004.

On November 10, 2017, it was announced that The Grissom Gang would become available on Blu-ray via Kino Lorber in the United States and Canada. The set was expected to arrive in early 2018, however, its release date was moved and will be available from November 27, 2018. An additional DVD set will also be released.

== Reception ==
=== Box office ===
The film earned $340,000 in North American rentals and $250,000 in other countries. It recorded an overall loss of $3,670,000. It had admissions of 239,768 in France.

Aldrich later called it a "fine movie" and was confused why it did not do better commercially when so many movies set in the 1930s around this time were popular. "I think the timing was perfect, the style of picture was perfect. If you're asking me why that picture wasn't a success, I haven't a clue."

=== Critical response ===
At the time of its release, reviewers criticized the melodramatic extremes of the script and the fact that the cast is shown sweating throughout the entire film. Vincent Canby of The New York Times wrote "You don't really have to think very much about The Grissom Gang to call it offensive, immoral and perhaps even lascivious, although to me, that word, when it is applied to an aim, is more of a promise than a threat. The Grissom Gang, like so many Aldrich films...carries lurid melodrama and violence to outrageous limits, for what often seems like the purely perverse hell of it...Everybody sweats constantly, and nobody dies off-screen, always on-screen, in what the newspapers of the day used to describe as a hail of bullets...Aldrich lets his performers, especially Miss Dailey and Wilson, behave as if they were in The Beverly Hillbillies."

Roger Ebert of the Chicago Sun-Times was only slightly less harsh, stating "We've been here before, most memorably with Bonnie and Clyde, but also with Roger Corman's seamy examination of the Barker family in Bloody Mama. Robert Aldrich's new film owes something to both. To Bonnie and Clyde for its convincing period feel, and to Bloody Mama for its treatment of a violent, sexually twisted family of criminals", adding "the movie is deliberately melodramatic, and to such an overdone degree that (if you suspend your sanity for an hour or so) you can almost wallow in it. Everyone screams, shouts, flashes knives at each other and sweats a lot."

Variety also added "Provided with a script that offers absolutely no insight into the inner lives of its people, director Robert Aldrich takes matters a step further by directing his actors in performances that strain the bounds of credulity. Wilson and Kim Darby, as the kidnapped girl, make stabs at more than one dimension, but when they indulge in caricatures of feeling, as they often do, they cancel out the rest of their work."

Modern critics hold the film in a slightly higher regard, with TimeOut writing "For one thing, the eponymous family, who kidnap '30s heiress Miss Blandish, are never glamorised but portrayed as a pathetic, ignorant bunch of grotesques; for another, as the petulant and spoilt heroine turns the sadistic and murderous Slim Grissom's love for her to her own cruelly humiliating purposes, the film becomes an unsentimental exploration of perverse power-games played between two characters whose very different family backgrounds cannot conceal the latent vulnerability they both share."

In 2009, Empire named it #12 in a poll of the 20 Greatest Gangster Movies You've Never Seen* (*Probably).

The film holds a 46% approval rating on Rotten Tomatoes, based on 13 reviews.

== See also ==
- List of American films of 1971
- No Orchids for Miss Blandish (1948 film)
