= Stork Talk =

1962 film by Michael Forlong

- Theatrical release poster
- Directed by: Michael Forlong
- Screenplay by: Donald Ford
- Produced by: Charles Bruce Newbery
- Starring: Tony Britton; Anne Heywood; John Turner
- Cinematography: Norman Warwick
- Edited by: John Jympson
- Music by: Tony Hatch
- Production company: Ardmore Studios
- Release date: 11 January 1962
- Running time: 94 minutes
- Country: United Kingdom
- Language: English

Stork Talk is a 1962 British film directed by Michael Forlong and starring Tony Britton and Anne Heywood. The screenplay was by Donald Ford.

== Plot ==
When his wife Lisa leaves him, gynaecologist Paul Vernon has an affair with Martine, who becomes pregnant. When Lisa comes back to him, she reveals she is also pregnant. Subsequently, both women give birth to twins. Paul and Lisa reconcile. Martine marries Paul's assistant Bob.

== Cast ==
- Tony Britton as Dr. Paul Vernon
- Anne Heywood as Lisa Vernon
- John Turner as Dr. Robert Sterne
- Nicole Perrault as Tina Monet
- Daphne Anderson as Dr. Mary Willis
- Marie Kean as Mrs. Webster
- Gladys Henson as Matron
- John Sharp as Papa Pierre
- John Molloy as pram salesman
- Gerry Sullivan as Dr. Sefton
- Marie Conmee as Mrs. Jeffries
- George Hill as Henry
- Pamela Mant as Mrs. Stanton

== Reception ==
The Monthly Film Bulletin wrote: "Though the title and subject suggest the worst, Stork Talk turns out to be a softly sentimental little comedy that doesn't overwork the ribald opportunities of its plot. There are a few mild maternity jokes, and although the script is without wit and substance it manages – after a leisurely start and with the help of a pleasing newcomer, Nicole Perrault, as Martine – to inject a modicum of poignancy into the crude situations. Tony Britton is hard to take as a light comedian, and the other roles are for the most part thankless."

Kine Weekly wrote: "The story tells a risqué tale, but smooth acting, subtle scripting and sensitive direction keep it within bounds. In fact, the libel on the medical profession has such exquisite humour that it could make The Lancet's staid readers chuckle, while there is no denying its built-in feminine appeal. Tony Britton takes a reel or so to warm up as Paul, but immediately Paul sees the writing of an affiliation order on the wall he really gets cracking."
