= Michael Forlong =

New Zealand writer, producer and director (1912–2000)

Michael Forlong (1912–2000) was a New Zealand writer, producer and director. He worked for the New Zealand National Film Unit before moving to England. From the 1970s onwards, he tended to make feature films for children.

== Select credits ==
- One Hundred Crowded Years (1940) – writer
- Bitter Springs (1950) – assistant director
- Suicide Mission (1954) – director, producer, writer
- Odongo (1956) – second unit director
- Safari (1956) – second unit director
- Alexander the Great (1956) – second unit director
- Dunkirk (1958) – associate producer
- The Green Helmet (1961) – director
- Over the Odds (1961) – director
- Stork Talk (1962) – director
- Tamahine (1963) – associate producer
- Plantage Tamarinde (1964) – director
- Lionheart (1968) – director, producer, writer
- A Car For All Reasons, Range Rover Promotional Video (1971) – producer
- Raising the Roof (1972) – director, writer
- Close to the Wind (1972) (short) – director, producer, writer
- Project 1233 (1972) (short) – director
- Rangi's Catch (1973) – producer
- Hijack! (1975) – director, producer, writer
- High Rise Donkey (1980) – director
