= The Billage of Perception: Chapter Three =

- Digital and 11:11 PM version cover

EP by Billlie
- Released: March 28, 2023
- Genre: K-pop; R&B; dance; nu jazz
- Length: 19:38
- Language: Korean
- Label: Mystic Story; Kakao

Billlie chronology
The Billage of Perception: Chapter Two (2022)	The Billage of Perception: Chapter Three (2023)	GingaMingaYo (the strange world) - Japanese ver. (2023)

Singles from The Billage of Perception: Chapter Three
- 1. "Eunoia" Released: March 28, 2023

The Billage of Perception: Chapter Three is the fourth extended play by South Korean girl group Billlie. It was released on March 28, 2023, by Mystic Story and distributed by Kakao Entertainment.

== Background and release ==
On February 7, 2023, Mystic Story confirmed that Billlie was preparing for a comeback with their fourth mini album. On March 6, it was announced the group would be releasing a new installation to their The Billage Of Perception series, to be released on the March 28. Pre-orders for the CD release of the album were opened on March 7, with 3 versions available; 01:01 AM, 11:11 AM, and 11:11 PM. On March 8, it was announced that Eunoia would serve as the lead single for the EP. The concept film for the EP titled 'enchanted night ~ 白夜': a prequel film of Billage of perception was released on March 20. A lyric video for the B-side track "Various and Precious (Moment of Inertia)" was released on 23 March.

== Composition ==
The album has incorporated various genres such as funk-pop, synth-pop, and pop-R&B. During the release showcase, it was revealed that the EP continues the groups story line developed through their previous EPs, with "the six tracks tell[ing] the story of what happened on the day Billie disappeared".

"Enchanted Night ~ 白夜" is an alternative disco-pop song, with a neo-funk style, danceable and groovy track with analog synth elements. The song is based on the original story of the same name by Steven Millhauser, describing the feeling of going for a stroll in the night and sharing stories with friends when young.

"Lion Heart (The Real Me)" is a fusion of moombahton and reggaeton, with a latin hip-hop beat. The song is said to contain the message that "courage comes from the heart, not the head".

The lead single "Eunoia" is described as an alternative funk pop track that combines the elements of synth wave, disco, and G-funk with an overall hip-hop theme. The title of the song is derived from the Greek word εὔνοιᾰ, which the group interpreted as "we all have mixed feelings about the world, and we must recognise and embrace that ambivalence in order to become our true selves".

"Various and Precious (Moment of Inertia)" combines nu jazz and 80's synth pop elements. The song is dedicated to Billlie's fandom Belllie've, with all members participating in writing lyrics. The title of the song is taken from the concept of the moment of inertia, expressing the organic relationship between Billlie and Belllie've.

"Extra-Ordinary" is a neo-funk song with UK acid jazz bass leading the song. The song is from a first person perspective, showing the character Billie confessing their worries and feelings to the narrator.

"Nevertheless" combines alternative R&B and neo soul elements, with the song having an emphasis on the members vocal abilities, featuring a complex top-line and harmonies.

== Promotion ==
On the afternoon of March 28, a showcase to commemorate the release was held at Shinhan pLay Square Live Hall in Seogyo-dong, Mapo-gu, Seoul.

Both "Eunoia" and "Enchanted Night ~ 白夜" were performed and promoted on music shows.

On April 4, Billlie received their first music show win on SBS's The Show with "Eunoia".

On April 24 it was announced by Mystic Story that promotional activities for the EP had ended. This came after the passing of member Moon Sua's brother Moonbin.

== Commercial performance ==
Data released by South Korean Hanteo Charts shows The Billage Of Perception: Chapter Three recorded 49,097 copies sold on its first day, marking a new career high for the group.

== Track listing ==
The Billage of Perception: Chapter Three track listing
No.	Title	Lyrics	Music	Arrangement	Length
1.	"Enchanted Night ~ 白夜"	Llano	PixelWave; Oiaisle; Boitello; Youha	Llano	2:59
2.	"Lionheart (The Real Me)"	Le'mon (153/Joombas)	Lee Woo-min "collapsedone"; STWP; Justin Reinstein; JJean	Lee Woo-min "collapsedone"; STWP	3:27
3.	"Eunoia"	Le'mon	PixelWave; Youha	PixelWave	3:23
4.	"Various and Precious (Moment of Inertia)"	Geumto (153/Joombas); Billlie	MinGtion; Oiaisle; Junny	MinGtion	3:16
5.	"Extra-Ordinary"	Jo Yoon-kyung	PixelWave; Xydo; Haeil	PixelWave	3:06
6.	"Nevertheless"	OGI (Galactika)	Woo-bin (Galactika); Ejae; Galactika	Team Galactika	3:25
Total length:					19:38

Notes

- All songs are stylised in all lowercase, except for "Eunoia" being stylised as "EUNOIA"
- "Enchanted Night ~ 白夜" is titled "enchanted night ~ white night" on streaming platforms

== Credits and personnel ==
Credits adapted from Melon.

=== Recording and management ===
- Executive production from Mystic Story
- Mixed at Studio89, Glab Studios, SoulTriii Lab Studio, KLANGSTUDIO and Stay Tuned Studio
- Recorded at Studio89 and Maxx Song
- Mastered at Sterling Sound
- Published by AMPLIFIED Corporation, JYP Publishing (KOMCA), NuVibe Music, Cherry On Top Music, GALACTIKA Inc., EKKO Music Rights

=== Personnel ===
- Billlie – vocals (all tracks), lyrics (track 4)
- Yoon Jong-shin - Executive Producer
- Jo Yeong-cheol - Executive Producer
- An Jeong-oh - Executive Supervisor
- Yeon Un-hyeok - Executive Supervisor
- Lee Hak-hui - Executive Supervisor
- Han Jeong-su - Executive Music & Entertainment Manager
- Jungsu Peacedelic HAN - Producer
- Jeong Il-Jin - Recording Engineer and Mixing Engineer
- Kim Ji-Hyun - Recording Engineer
- Shin Bong-won - Mixing Engineer
- JoXuatrii (A.K.A Park Jun Hyung) - Mixing Engineer
- Gu Jong-pil - Mixing Engineer
- Chris Gehringer - Mastering Engineer

== Charts ==
=== Weekly charts ===
Weekly chart performance for The Billage of Perception: Chapter Three
Chart (2023)	Peak position
South Korean Albums (Circle)	5

List of songs, in order of highest to lowest ranking
Title	Peak chart positions
Title	KOR Downloads
"Eunoia"	47
"Enchanted Night ~ 白夜"	121
"Lionheart (The Real Me)"	123
"Nevertheless"	126
"Various and Precious (Moment of Inertia)"	130
"Extra-ordinary"	131

=== Monthly charts ===
Monthly chart performance for The Billage of Perception: Chapter Three
Chart (2023)	Peak position
South Korean Albums (Circle)	14

== Release history ==
Release history and formats for The Billage of Perception: Chapter Three
Region	Date	Format	Label
South Korea	March 28, 2023	CD; digital download; streaming	Mystic Story; Kakao Entertainment
Various	March 28, 2023	Digital download; streaming	Mystic Story; Kakao Entertainment
