= Cornel Lucas =

English photographer (1920–2012)

Henry Cornelius Lucas (12 September 1920 – 8 November 2012), better known as Cornel Lucas, was a British photographer who as a film still photographer was a pioneer of film portraiture in the 1940s and 1950s.

He was the first photographer to win a BAFTA in 1998 for Services to British Film Industry.

Cornel Lucas published two books of his work, Heads and Tales and Shooting Stars.

Exhibited internationally. Permanent collection at National Portrait Gallery (London), National Media Museum and London's Photographers' Gallery. In 1943, he joined the Royal Photographic Society becoming a Fellow.

Cornel Lucas photographed many movies stars in the late forties and fifties including Marlene Dietrich, David Niven, Gregory Peck, Robert Newton, Joan Collins, Yvonne De Carlo, Diana Dors (in a gondola in Venice). He was in charge of the photographic studios set up by the Rank Organisation.

== Personal life ==
He was married to actress Belinda Lee in 1954, but divorced in 1959 on the grounds of her adultery allegedly with Prince Filippo Orsini. He married the actress Susan Travers. They had four children together, including actress Charlotte Lucas.
