= Richard Morant =

English actor (1945–2011)

- Born: 30 October 1945; Shipston-on-Stour, Warwickshire, England
- Died: 9 November 2011 (aged 66); Richmond, London, England
- Education: Central School of Speech and Drama
- Occupation: Actor
- Spouses: Melissa Fairbanks (m. 1969; div. 1979) Valerie Buchanan (m. 1982)
- Children: 4
- Relatives: Angela Morant (sister); Bill Travers (uncle); Linden Travers (aunt); Penelope Wilton (cousin)

Richard Morant (30 October 1945 – 9 November 2011) was an English actor.

== Biography ==
Morant was born in Shipston-on-Stour, Warwickshire. His father was Shakespearean actor Philip Morant (1909–1993). His sister is actress Angela Morant. He was also a nephew of actors Bill and Linden Travers, and a cousin of actress Penelope Wilton. He trained at the Central School of Speech and Drama before joining the Prospect Theatre Company, and touring with Ian McKellen in Richard II, Edward II and Twelfth Night.

Morant had a long television and theatrical career, first as Flashman in a BBC adaptation of the Thomas Hughes novel, Tom Brown's Schooldays (1971), and a starring role in Thames Television's Armchair Theatre play Verité (1972) and a regular role as Dr Dwight Enys in the BBC series Poldark (1975).

Morant also appeared in several BBC serials, including adaptations of Walter Scott's Woodstock (1973), as the future Charles II, and The Talisman (1980), as Conrade of Montserrat.

He played Maximilien Robespierre in The Scarlet Pimpernel (1982), and the titular character in the second series of the children's programme Captain Zep - Space Detective. He later played Mervyn Bunter, the valet of Lord Peter Wimsey, in A Dorothy L. Sayers Mystery, the BBC's 1987 productions of Strong Poison, Have His Carcase and Gaudy Night (all based on Dorothy Sayers's original novels). In 1988 he played Theodore Dyke Acland in the serial Jack the Ripper.

His film roles included Zeppelin (1971), Mahler (1974), The Company of Wolves (1984), The Second Victory (1986), Scandal (1989) and Janice Beard (1999).

His stage appearances included a starring role in Noël Coward's Private Lives at the Theatre Royal, Bath in 1984. The following year he co-starred with Stephanie Beacham and Pam Ferris in ITV's rag-trade soap drama, Connie. He also did voice-over, radio, and audio book work including voicing books by Julian Barnes and Julian Fellowes.

== Personal life ==
Morant's first wife was Melissa Fairbanks, a daughter of Douglas Fairbanks Jr., with whom he had a son and daughter. His second wife was Valerie Buchanan, with whom he had another son and daughter.

He had a sideline as a dealer in Asian carpets and textiles, including running his own gallery in Notting Hill. In 2005 he became the sole owner of an established company specialising in carpets and fine textiles, headquartered in Notting Hill, London. After suffering a short illness, Morant died suddenly of an aneurysm on 9 November 2011, aged 66.

== Filmography ==
| Year | Title | Role | Notes |
|---|---|---|---|
| 1969 | Battle of Britain | Replacement Pilot - Red Section 'Red 2' | Uncredited |
| 1971 | Zeppelin | Billy Chisholm | Uncredited |
| 1974 | Mahler | Max | |
| 1974 | The Protectors - Episode The Bridge | David Mitchell | TV series |
| 1975 | Hijack! | Colin | |
| 1975 | Poldark | Dr Dwight Enys | TV movie |
| 1977 | The Hunchback of Notre Dame | Phoebus | TV movie |
| 1980 | The Merchant of Venice | Lorenzo | TV movie |
| 1982 | The Scarlet Pimpernel | Maximilien Robespierre | |
| 1982 | The Agatha Christie Hour | Dermot West | "The Red Signal" |
| 1983 | On the Third Day | Jeremy Bolt | |
| 1984 | The Company of Wolves | Wealthy Groom | |
| 1985 | The Last Place on Earth | Lawrence Oates | |
| 1987 | The Second Victory | Capt. Johnson | |
| 1989 | Scandal | D'Lazlo | |
| 1999 | Janice Beard | Boss | |
| 2006 | Day Night Day Night | Flirt | Final film role |
