= One Hundred Crowded Years =

Film celebrating New Zealand centenary

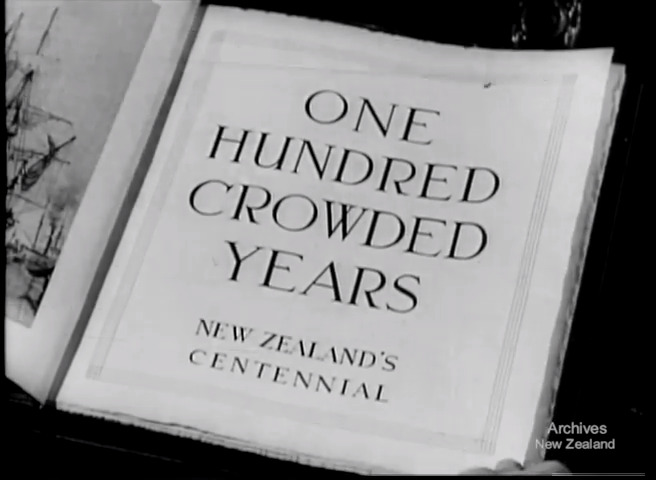
- Directed by: Herbert Howard Moulton (Bert) Bridgman
- Written by: Michael Forlong
- Narrated by: B.V. Beeby
- Cinematography: C.D. Barton; R.M. McIntyre
- Edited by: Cyril James Morton
- Music by: F. Crowther
- Production company: Government Film Studios, Miramar
- Distributed by: NZ Film Archives
- Release date: 28 November 1940
- Running time: 54 minutes
- Country: New Zealand
- Language: English

One Hundred Crowded Years is a 1940 New Zealand historical documentary film directed by H.H. Bridgman. It was produced by the government film studios at Miramar for the centenary of New Zealand.

== Content ==
One Hundred Crowded Years (1941)

The film is a history of New Zealand, from pioneer settlers in 1840, gold rushes, Māori wars, stage coaches and frontier towns. There are also panoramas of New Zealand's scenery. Also showing social and economic development from 1840 to 1940.

== Production ==
For the government to celebrate the centennial, the Hon Frank Langstone decided on the production of a promotional film. The inspiration was the official 1938 New South Wales government film commemorating the sesquicentenary of the founding of Australia, A Nation is Built directed and produced by Frank Hurley.

== Release ==
Cinemas agreed to air the film without charge to the government, and to donate the sixpence fee from children to "patriotic funds". About 8,000 schoolchildren in Wellington saw the film, raising £200 for those funds. However, not all showings were well-attended. One showing was cancelled because the local body did not allow screenings on Sundays. Another local council rescinded its ban on Sunday screenings to allow this film to be shown.

== Reviews ==
The Auckland Star described the documentary as "a short but colourful sketch of New Zealand's history".

The Evening Post gave a detailed review and synopsis, saying "It excels on the pictorial side, and the Government photographers show that in this respect they have but little to learn from overseas competitors."

The Northern Advocate called it "an excellent feature" and added "Remarkable bird studies, and some striking scenic glimpses, give the film a wide appeal."
