= Marie Kean =

Irish actress (1918–1993)

- in her one-woman show, Dublin, 1971
- Born: 27 June 1918; Rush, Ireland
- Died: 30 December 1993 (aged 75); Donnybrook, Dublin, Ireland
- Occupation: Actress

Marie Kean (27 June 1918 – 29 December 1993) was an Irish stage and screen actress, with a career spanning over 40 years, The Stage called her one of Ireland's most impressive actresses, and "an artist of considerable emotional depth and theatrical command."

== Life ==
Kean grew up in the village of Rush, County Dublin, and was educated at Loreto College, North Great George's Street, Dublin. She learned her craft at the Gaiety School of Acting and was part of the Abbey Theatre company until 1961.

Kean's leading role as the kindly matriarch Mrs. Kennedy in the Radio Éireann serial drama The Kennedys of Castleross made her famous throughout Ireland. She starred in the programme for the duration of its 18-year run.

In 1968, Kean won a Jacob's Award for her performance as Winnie in RTÉ television's production of Samuel Beckett's play Happy Days, a role she had performed on stage and which she described later as her favourite part. Among her other television roles was that of Mrs. Conn Brickley, Bridget's mother, in an episode of the Irish RM titled "The Boat's Share".

Kean's many stage appearances include performances in the plays of Synge, O'Casey and Friel. She had the lead role of Maggie Polpin in the 1969 world première of John B. Keane's play Big Maggie at the Cork Opera House In 1978 she won the State of New York best actress award for her performance in what has become Keane's most successful play.

Arguably her most memorable film role was as Barry's scheming mother in Stanley Kubrick's Barry Lyndon. She also played a bigoted Irish shopkeeper in David Lean's Ryan's Daughter. Her final movie appearance was in John Huston's The Dead (1987), in which she played the part of Mrs. Malins.

Marie Kean died in Donnybrook, Dublin at the age of 75. Her husband William Mulvey predeceased her in 1977.

== Filmography ==
Year	Title	Role	Notes
1956	Jacqueline	Mrs. Flannagan	
1958	Rooney	Mrs. O'Flynn	
1958	Sally's Irish Rogue	Ellen Carey	
1960	A Terrible Beauty	Mrs. Matia Devlin (the publican)	
1961	The Big Gamble	Cynthia	
1962	The Quare Fellow	Mrs. O'Hara	
1962	Stork Talk	Mrs. Webster	
1964	Girl with Green Eyes	Josie Hannigan	
1966	I Was Happy Here		
1966	Cul-de-sac	Marion Fairweather	
1966	The Fighting Prince of Donegal	Iníon Dubh	
1968	Great Catherine	Princess Dashkoff	
1970	Ryan's Daughter	Mrs. McCardle	
1975	Barry Lyndon	Belle, Barry's Mother	
1982	Angel	Mae	
1987	The Dead	Mrs. Malins	
1987	The Lonely Passion of Judith Hearne	Mrs. Rice	
