= La Chair de l'orchidée =

1975 film

- Directed by: Patrice Chéreau
- Written by: James Hadley Chase (novel); Jean-Claude Carrière; Patrice Chéreau
- Produced by: Vincent Malle
- Starring: Charlotte Rampling; Bruno Cremer; Edwige Feuillère; Simone Signoret; Alida Valli; Hans Christian Blech
- Cinematography: Pierre Lhomme
- Edited by: Pierre Gillette
- Music by: Fiorenzo Carpi
- Distributed by: Fox-Lira
- Release date: 29 January 1975
- Running time: 110 minutes
- Countries: France; Italy; West Germany
- Language: French

La Chair de l'orchidée (The Flesh of the Orchid) is a 1975 film by Patrice Chéreau as his directorial debut, adapted by him and by Jean-Claude Carrière from the 1948 book The Flesh of the Orchid by British writer James Hadley Chase, "a pulp-novel sequel to No Orchids for Miss Blandish" (1939). The film stars Charlotte Rampling, Simone Signoret, Bruno Cremer, Edwige Feuillère and, in a cameo, Alida Valli.

== Plot ==
Claire is locked up in an isolated building in the grounds of a psychiatric hospital, where the gardener comes in regularly to rape her. Obtaining a knife, she stabs his eyes out and flees. Getting a lift in a lorry, it crashes when the driver has his eyes stabbed out; Emerging from the wreckage, she is rescued by Louis who, with an unstable colleague Marcucci, is on his way to a business meeting in a hotel. While Louis is in the meeting, Marcucci tries to rape Claire and gets his eyes stabbed out. Claire flees and Marcucci, unable to defend himself, is then knifed to death by contract killers, the Berekian brothers.

Louis rescues Claire and takes her back to his isolated house, where they spend the night making love. However the Berekians are waiting outside and, when the couple emerge, get a knife into Louis. Claire rescues him, leaving him in a safe place while she goes in search of a doctor. She is recognised by a nurse from the psychiatric hospital, who alerts her aunt who placed her there. In fact she is the heiress to a business empire, which her aunt controls so long as Claire is mentally unfit. Locked up by the nurse, Claire is found by the Berekians, who abduct her as a bargaining counter. The aunt finds the wounded Louis, who she locks up as a bargaining counter.

The Berekians lock Claire up in the care of Lady, a colleague from the days when all three were circus performers. Feeling sorry for the girl, Lady tells her that she is the result of her dead mother's affair with a circus artiste and lets her escape; As she waits for a train, she is told by an older woman that she is recognisably insane. She goes to her aunt's house, where Louis is a prisoner, and reunites with him. The accountant of the family firm tells her it is going downhill through the aunt's mismanagement and that, as the rightful owner, she should take charge.

The Berekians sneak in and manage to murder Louis, but Claire stabs out the eyes of one of them. The police arrive and, wounded in her struggle, Claire is taken to a hospital. Lady sneaks in to her with a bunch of flowers, but the two are found by the surviving Berekian. He kills Lady and, after a flashback to a moment of horror when he accidentally killed the woman he loved, commits suicide. With the two bodies on either side of her hospital bed, Claire gets on the phone to the accountant to start running her business.
