= Ben Aris =

English actor (1937–2003)

- Born: Benjamin Patrick Aris; 16 March 1937; London, England
- Died: 4 September 2003 (aged 66); Esher, Surrey, England
- Years active: 1951–2002
- Spouse: Yemaiel Oved (m. 1966)
- Children: 2, including Jonathan Aris

Benjamin Patrick Aris (16 March 1937 – 4 September 2003) was an English actor who was best known for his parts in Hi-de-Hi! and To the Manor Born, and was also very active on stage. He was often cast as an eccentric, upper-class or upper-middle class man.

== Early life and education ==
Benjamin Patrick Aris was born on 16 March 1937 in London, and following the Second World War, he trained at the Arts Educational School.

At the age of 16, he joined a national tour of the show Zip Goes a Million. He then did his national service in the British Army.

== Early career ==
After completing his national service, Aris appeared in many musicals and films, including The Plague of the Zombies, The Charge of the Light Brigade and if..... On stage, Aris was in the 1960 production of the revue "One Over The Eight" at the Duke of York's Theatre in London.

He also appeared in Tony Richardson's 1969 production of "Hamlet" at London's Roundhouse, its New York transfer to the Lunt-Fontanne Theatre, and also its film version the same year.

== Film and television career ==
His first television role was in the children's series Jamie in 1971. He also appeared in Invasion of the Dinosaurs, a 1974 Doctor Who serial. His other early television roles included Some Mothers Do 'Ave 'Em, Sam and the River (1975), Crown Court, Wodehouse Playhouse and Target. During that time he also appeared in the films Get Carter, The Three Musketeers, Digby, the Biggest Dog in the World and Juggernaut. He also worked several times for director Ken Russell, in films The Music Lovers, Savage Messiah, and Tommy, and in TV's The Rime of the Ancient Mariner and Lady Chatterley.

For three episodes, from 1980 to 1981, he played Mr Spalding in To the Manor Born, and then in 1983, he portrayed Edmund Waller, one of Tom Lacey's friends at the court of Charles I, in By the Sword Divided. In 1984, he made his first appearance in Hi-de-Hi! as Julian Dalrymple-Sykes, a dancer. He became a regular in 1986 and played the part until the show's end in 1988. He also starred in Bergerac, Agatha Christie's Poirot, You Rang, M'Lord? and Boon. As well as acting with Penelope Keith in To the Manor Born, he also appeared with her in Executive Stress and No Job for a Lady.

== Later years ==
One of the most memorable stage performances was in the West End playing Geoffrey in Stepping Out by Richard Harris. His final stage appearance was in The Lady in the Van by Alan Bennett, opposite Dame Maggie Smith. His final TV appearance was in the 2002 drama Ready. He died in Surrey in 2003 aged 66. His son Jonathan Aris followed him into acting.

== Selected filmography ==
=== Film ===
- Tom Brown's Schooldays (1951) - Tadpole (uncredited)
- The Plague of the Zombies (1966) - John Martinus
- The Mini-Affair (1968) - TV Producer
- The Charge of the Light Brigade (1968) - Lt. Maxse
- if.... (1968) - John Thomas: Staff
- Lionheart (1968) - Capt. Harris
- Hamlet (1969) - Rosencrantz
- The Reckoning (1970) - Moustached Party Guest (uncredited)
- Say Hello to Yesterday (1971) - Floor Walker (uncredited)
- The Music Lovers (1971) - Young Lieutenant
- Get Carter (1971) - Architect #2
- Savage Messiah (1972) - Thomas Buff
- O Lucky Man! (1973) - Mr. MacIntyre / Dr. Hyder / Flight Lt. Wallace
- Digby, the Biggest Dog in the World (1973) - Army Captain
- The Three Musketeers (1973) - 1st Musketeer
- Juggernaut (1974) - The Walker
- Vampira (1974) - Policeman
- Smokey Joe's Revenge (1974) - Mr. Fawcett
- Alfie Darling (1975) - Advertising Man
- Tommy (1975) - Reverend Simpson
- Royal Flash (1975) - Fireman
- I'm Not Feeling Myself Tonight (1976) - Trampas B. Hildebrand
- The Ritz (1976) - Patron With Bicycle
- Voyage of the Damned (1976) - German Jewish Passenger (uncredited)
- Sir Henry at Rawlinson End (1980) - Lord Tarquin of Staines
- King of the Wind (1990) - Squire Dunn
- U.F.O. (1993) - Doctor
- Up at the Villa (2000) - Col. Trail
- Relative Values (2000) - (uncredited)
- Undertaker's Paradise (2000)

=== TV ===
- Gazette (1968) - Potter (1 episode)
- The Wednesday Play - Mad Jack (1970) - Jenkins
- Jamie (1971) - David Dodger (9 episodes)
- Owen, M.D. (1971) - Mr. Clarke (2 episodes)
- The Silver Sword (1971) - Russian Commisar (1 episode)
- Some Mothers Do 'Ave 'Em' - Brown (1 episode)
- Doctor Who - Invasion of the Dinosaurs (1974) - Lieutenant Shears (1 episode)
- Crown Court (1975) - Dr. Bruce Morgan (3 episodes)
- Sam and the River (1975) - Lt. Hodges (6 episodes)
- Village Hall (1975) - Stan (1 episode)
- Wodehouse Playhouse (1976) - Lester Mapledurham (1 episode)
- Get Some In! (1977) - Dr. Purnell (1 episode)
- Target (1977) - Phillips (1 episode)
- Hazell (1978) - T.P. Eades (1 episode)
- The Famous Five (1978) - Mr Durleston (1 episode)
- Spy! (1980) - Skier (1 episode)
- The Assassination Run (1980) - Frank Lloyd (3 episodes)
- To the Manor Born (1980-1) - Spalding (3 episodes)
- Cribb (1981) - Captain Allbright (1 episode)
- The Bagthorpe Saga (1981) - P.J. (1 episode)
- The Trechary Game (1981) - Frank Lloyd (3 episodes)
- Bergerac (1982) - Executive (1 episode)
- By the Sword Divided (1983) - Edmund Waller (1 episode)
- Night Train to Murder (1984) - Theatre Manager (TV Movie)
- Shine on Harvey Moon (1984) - Doctor (1 episode)
- He-De-Hi! (1984-8) - Julian Dalrymple-Sykes (13 episodes)
- All in Good Faith (1985) - Dillforth (1 episode)
- Star Quality (1985) - Eric Larch (TV Movie)
- Call Me Mister (1986) - Registrar (1 episode)
- Chance in a Million (1986) - Club Secretary (1 episode)
- Executive Stress (1986) - Andrew Morgan (2 episodes)
- Paradise Postponed (1986) - TV Newsreader (1 episode)
- Slinger's Day (1986) - Forbes-Fortescue (1 episode)
- A Hazard of Hearts (1987) - Lieutenant of Dragoons (TV Movie)
- Hold the Dream (1987) - Doctor (1 episode)
- First of the Summer Wine (1988) - First Visitor (1 episode)
- The Comic Strip Presents... (1988) - Party Guest
- Poirot (1989) - Captain Fowler (1 episode)
- Young Charlie Chaplin (1989) - Mr. Vernon (1 episode)
- Boon (1990) - Maitre D' (1 episode)
- Mr Majeika (1990) - Flight Office Pongo (1 episode)
- You Rang, M'Lord? (1990) - Special Branch Policeman (1 episode)
- Further Up Pompeii (1991) - Flatus (TV Movie)
- No Job for a Lady (1991) - Roland (1 episode)
- Eldorado (1992) - Kenneth Owen (2 episodes)
- Me, You and Him (1992) - Headmaster (1 episode)
- The Bill (1992) - Judge (1 episode)
- Lady Chatterley (1993) - Tommy Dukes (1 episode)
- September Song (1994) - Simon Anderson (5 episodes)
- The Last Englishman (1995) - Doctor, 1917 (TV Movie)
- The Queen's Nose (1996-9) - Max (4 episodes)
- Equinox (1998) - Director General BBC (1 episode)
