= Charlotte Lucas =

English actress (born 1976)

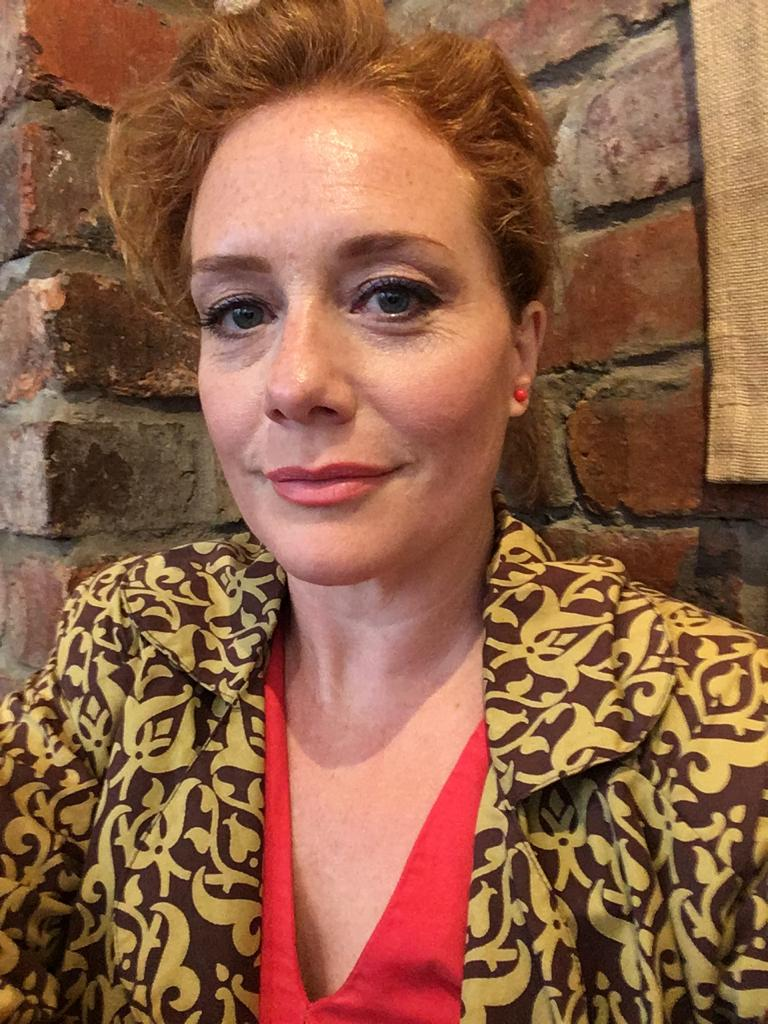
- Born: 29 May 1976 (age 50); London, England
- Occupations: Actress; painter; therapist
- Years active: 1999–present
- Notable work: Bad Girls
- Height: 1.70 m (5 ft 7 in)
- Parent(s): Susan Travers (mother); Cornel Lucas (father)
- Relatives: Linden Travers (grandmother); Bill Travers (great-uncle)

Charlotte Lucas (born 29 May 1976) is an English actress. She is best known for her roles as Dr. Kingsley in Not Going Out, EastEnders as Yvonne and Bad Girls as Selena Geeson.

== Early life and education ==
Born into an acting family, Lucas is the daughter of actress Susan Travers and photographer Cornel Lucas. Her grandmother was actress Linden Travers and her great-uncle was Bill Travers.

Lucas attended drama and theatre studies at the University of Birmingham, before concluding her studies at Royal Academy of Dramatic Art (RADA) in London.

== Career ==
She is best known for her role as Selena Geeson in Bad Girls. She also starred in the 2003 film Oh Marbella!, as well as a number of other TV programmes, including EastEnders, Midsomer Murders, Doctors and Not Going Out, plus an episode of Adventure Inc. when filming transferred to the UK for four episodes. Lucas played the role of Mrs Bassat in BBC One's 2014 adaptation of Daphne du Maurier's novel Jamaica Inn.

In 2017, she appeared in the third series of Broadchurch.

== Filmography ==
Film
Year	Title	Role	Director
1999	Digging Holes	Berne’s	Andrew Clements
2003	Oh Marbella!	Emily	Piers Ashworth
2006	These Foolish Things	Lily Evans	Julia Taylor-Stanley
2008	Last Chance Harvey	Gwen	Joel Hopkins
2011	A Thousand Kisses Deep	Stella	Dana Lustig
2012	Cleanskin	Nurse	Hadi Hajaig

Television
Year	Title	Role	Notes
2003	Adventure Inc.	Lady Fay Sandringham	Series 1 (guest; #1.15)
2003	EastEnders	Yvonne	Soap opera (recurring; 5 episodes)
2003–2004	Bad Girls	Selena Geeson	Series 5–6 (regular; 14 episodes)
2005	Down to Earth	Sgt. Prosser	Series 5 (guest; #5.3)
2005	Holby City	Lexie Robbins	Series 7 (guest; #7.49)
2006	Judge John Deed	Sasha Bard	Series 5 (guest; #5.6)
2006	The Bill	Andrea Manning	Series 22 (guest; #22.83)
2008	Midsomer Murders	Sophie Hammond	Series 11 (guest; #11.1)
2009	Doctors	Cat Jennson	Series 11 (guest; #11.13)
2009	Casualty	Ronnie King	Series 24 (guest; #24.16)
2011	Doctors	Amy Layfield	Series 12 (guest; #12.178)
2012	Not Going Out	Dr. Kingsley	Series 5 (guest; #5.5)
2014	Jamaica Inn	Mrs. Bassat	Miniseries (supporting; 2 episodes)
2015	WPC 56	Charlotte Briggs	Series 3 (supporting; 5 episodes)
2017	Broadchurch	Sarah Elsey	Series 3 (guest; #2.3 & #2.4)
2017	Father Brown	Rose Marie Sturgess	Series 6 (guest; #6.1)
2018	A Very English Scandal	Janet Lawrence	Miniseries (supporting; 1 episode)
2020	Call the Midwife	Miss Williams	Series 9 (guest; #9.6)
2020	The Queen's Gambit	Mrs. Dodge	Miniseries (supporting; 1 episode)
