= Hijack! (1975 film) =

1975 British children's film by Michael Forlong

- Opening titles
- Directed by: Michael Forlong
- Written by: Michael Forlong
- Produced by: Michael Forlong
- Starring: Richard Morant; James Forlong; Tracy Peel
- Cinematography: William Jordan
- Edited by: Frederick Ives
- Music by: Harry Robertson
- Production company: Michael Forlong Productions
- Release date: 1975
- Running time: 59 minutes
- Country: United Kingdom
- Language: English

Hijack! is a 1975 children's drama film directed, written and produced by Michael Forlong and starring Richard Morant, James Forlong and Tracy Peel.

== Plot ==
Three children are taken hostage by a man armed with a hand grenade and flick-knife. He takes them to sea aboard their father's yacht.

== Cast ==
- Richard Morant as Colin
- James Forlong as Jack
- Tracy Peel as Jenny
- Sally Forlong as Lucy
- David Hitchen as power boat driver
- Richard Kerrigan as power boat mechanic
- Derek Bond as power boat owner
- Robert Swales as policeman

== Production ==
The film was sponsored by the Children's Film Foundation.

== Reception ==
The Monthly Film Bulletin wrote: "Technically, this is one of the best CFF films yet made, with lively location shooting (under clearly difficult and cramped conditions) on board the yacht, excellently controlled colour and a fine narrative pace. Although the story rather obviously cashes in on current newspaper headlines, the predicament of the children is never exploited in a melodramatic way, and they respond in a realistic and spontaneous manner. Richard Morant as the fugitive (we never discover what he has done) has a more difficult task, starting off in a somewhat actorish style, but later investing the character with just the right degree of desperate confusion. The film again demonstrates how a resourceful director and cameraman can turn out a neat little film within a well-prescribed format."

Robert Shail wrote: "The film is packed with enough detail to pass for a visual manual on how to sail a small craft at sea ... ranks as one of its best seafaring adventures."
