= Sher Dil =

Sher Dil (lit. 'Lionheart') may refer to:

- Sher Dil (Indian film), a 1990 Indian Hindi-language film
- Sher Dil (Pakistani film), a 1990 Pakistani action film
- Sherdil: The Pilibhit Saga, a 2022 Indian Hindi-language film by Srijit Mukherji
- Anjaneyulu (film), 2009 Indian Telugu-language action comedy film by Parasuram, titled Sher Dil in Hindi
- Sherdil Shergill, a 2022 Indian television drama
- Sher Dil Shergil, a fictional character in the 2013 Indian soap opera Ek Nanad Ki Khushiyon Ki Chaabi – Meri Bhabhi

== See also ==
- Lionheart (disambiguation)
