= The Last Adventurers =

- Opening titles
- Directed by: Roy Kellino
- Written by: Denison Clift (adapted from a story by)
- Produced by: Henry Passmore
- Starring: Niall MacGinnis; Roy Emerton; Linden Travers
- Cinematography: Eric Cross
- Edited by: David Lean
- Music by: Eric Ansell
- Production company: Conway Productions
- Distributed by: Sound City Films (UK)
- Release dates: 28 October 1937 (London, UK)
- Running time: 71 minutes
- Country: United Kingdom
- Language: English

The Last Adventurers (also known as Down to the Sea in Ships) is a 1937 British drama film directed by Roy Kellino and starring Niall MacGinnis, Roy Emerton, Linden Travers and Peter Gawthorne. It was adapted from a story by Denison Clift.

== Premise ==
A shipwrecked castaway is rescued by a sea captain, and then falls in love with the captain's daughter.

== Cast ==
- Niall MacGinnis as Jeremy Bowker
- Roy Emerton as John Arkell
- Linden Travers as Ann Arkell
- Peter Gawthorne as Fergus Arkell
- Kay Walsh as Margaret Arkell
- Johnnie Schofield as Stalk
- Ballard Berkeley as Fred Devlin
- Norah Howard as Mary Allen
- Bill Shine as Joe Hanson
- Esma Cannon as Polly Shepherd
- Wallace Douglas as Red Collins

== Critical reception ==
Kine Weekly wrote: "Spectacular drama of life amongst the trawler men of Grimsby set in authentic atmosphere. The documentary and the dramatic are not too evenly balanced, for there is a tendency to put detail before narratal urge but imaginative camera work, realistic thrills and convincing character drawing by an impressive cast nevertheless preserve adequate equanimity of interest. The film's regard for realism is praiseworthy. Outstanding entertainment of its type."

The Daily Film Renter wrote: "Magnificently photographed seascapes with scenes of ships in peril, and documentary interludes of ramifications of North Sea fishing industry, but actual story embraces familiar situations and stock characters. Pleasant entertainment with special angles for discriminating patrons."

Picturegoer wrote: "The documentary side of this picture is stronger than the dramatic, and provides a thrilling shape of the work of the Grimsby trawlers. Camera work is particularly good and the authentic atmosphere is a great asset. ... Niall McGinnis is easily natural as Jeremy and Linden Travers makes a pretty heroine, as well as a sympathetic one."

Picture Show wrote: "The simple story of this film has been made into interesting entertainment through the glimpses of trawler life we are given ... The players acquit themselves well, although their accents are not always satisfactory. The storm and rescue scenes are finely photographed."

In the Radio Times, David Parkinson wrote, "It's a pity there's not much entertainment value to be had from this wonderful curio about a twice-shipwrecked castaway saved by a sea captain whose daughter he then falls in love with, much to the old tar's displeasure. What is fascinating about Roy Kellino's adventure is that it was edited, with greater tautness than it deserves, by director-in-waiting David Lean. The casting is also noteworthy, with future Carry On star Esma Cannon in a rare glamour role, and Ballard Berkeley (who would later achieve fame as the Major in Fawlty Towers) playing the heroic lead."
