= Nicole Riche =

French stage and film actress

Nicole Rischmann (1 November 1925 – 26 May 1990), better known by her stage name of Nicole Riche, was a French stage and film actress.

Riche was born in November 1925 in Villeneuve-le-Roi, France. In 1950 she starred in a French stage adaptation of No Orchids for Miss Blandish which a review in Carrefour called a masterpiece. Time described her performance as "two hours in panties and a bra, successfully pursued by drooling Gangster Slim Grisson". Riche disappeared between acts during one of the performances which was canceled and the audience was given their money back. A letter was found in her dressing room condemning her for appearing in an "immoral" production. She appeared two days later stating that she had been kidnapped, released and was found by gypsies in a woods. The story was dismissed by the police as "poppycock" . She was suspended from the French Actor's Guild Council for her participation in the hoax.

Her film credits include Mr. Peek-a-Boo (1951), La Reine Margot (1954) and Nana (1955).

She died in May 1990 in Boulogne-Billancourt, France at the age of 64.

== Selected filmography ==
- The Village of Wrath (1947)
- Doctor Laennec (1949)
- The Porter from Maxim's (1953)
- Queen Margot (1954)
