= No Orchids for Miss Blandish (film) =

1949 film by St John Legh Clowes

- Theatrical release poster
- Directed by: St. John Legh Clowes
- Written by: St. John Legh Clowes
- Based on: No Orchids for Miss Blandish (1939 novel) by James Hadley Chase; No Orchids for Miss Blandish (1942 play) by James Hadley Chase Robert Nesbitt
- Produced by: St. John Legh Clowes
- Starring: Jack La Rue; Hugh McDermott; Linden Travers; Walter Crisham
- Cinematography: Gerald Gibbs
- Edited by: Manuel del Campo
- Music by: George Melachrino
- Production company: Tudor-Alliance
- Distributed by: Renown Pictures Corporation
- Release date: 13 April 1948
- Running time: 102 minutes
- Country: United Kingdom
- Language: English
- Budget: $800,000

No Orchids for Miss Blandish (re-released in the United States as Black Dice) is a 1948 British gangster film written, produced and directed by St. John Legh Clowes. It is an adaptation of the 1939 novel by James Hadley Chase, and the subsequent 1942 stage play by Chase and Robert Nesbitt. It stars Jack La Rue, Hugh McDermott, and Linden Travers (reprising her title role from the play), with unbilled early appearances from Sid James and Walter Gotell.

Due to the film's strong implied violence and sexual content for its time, amongst other reasons, British critics called it one of the worst films ever made.

== Plot ==
Miss Blandish, a sheltered heiress, is targeted for a simple robbery by a cheap thug who ultimately involves two groups of rival gangsters, their goal being her diamond jewelry worth $100,000. The robbery is botched when one of the robbers, Riley, is knocked down by her bridegroom, Foster Harvey, and the resulting shooting spree leaves Harvey and some of the assailants dead. The surviving robber, Bailey, drives away with Miss Blandish, leaving the dead bodies behind. Bailey meets up with two members of the Grisson gang and they decide to keep hold of Miss Blandish for ransom instead.

She ends up the captive of the Grisson gang and her father puts a private detective on the case. Ma Grisson who leads the gang, intends to collect the ransom and kill Blandish rather than take the risk of releasing her. Meanwhile, Slim Grisson and Blandish fall in love and plan on running away together.

Blandish sends the diamonds to her father with a note saying she is in love with Slim, but he refuses to believe it. Meanwhile, Ma Grisson is shot by rival gangsters when she cannot get Slim to the phone. The police surround the cabin where Slim and Miss Blandish are holed up and gun Slim down, "rescuing" the kidnap victim and returning her safely home. Afterwards, she throws herself from her balcony over the loss of Slim.

== Cast ==
- Jack La Rue as Slim Grisson
- Hugh McDermott as Dave Fenner
- Linden Travers as Miss Blandish
- Walter Crisham as Eddie Schultz
- MacDonald Parke as Doc
- Danny Green as Flyn
- Lilli Molnar as Ma Grisson
- Charles Goldner as Louis
- Zoe Gail as Margo
- Leslie Bradley as Ted Bailey
- Richard Neilson as Riley
- Frances Marsden as Anna Borg
- Michael Balfour as Barney
- Bill O'Connor as Johnny
- John McLaren as Foster Harvey
- Percy Marmont as Mr. Blandish
- Toy & Wing as themselves

Uncredited

- Walter Gotell as Joe, nightclub doorman
- Sid James as Ted, bartender

== Production ==
Gene D. Phillips of Loyola University of Chicago that "It is a matter of record that [the source novel] was heavily indebted to [William Faulkner's] Sanctuary for its plot line." Jack La Rue (Slim) had previously played the similar character of Trigger in the 1933 Sanctuary adaptation The Story of Temple Drake.

Jane Russell was sought for the leading role. The part was eventually played by Linden Travers, who had played it in the 1942 West End production of the stage version.

The film was meant to be the first of eight films shot in Britain that were set in America. James Minter was the executive behind the idea.

== Censorship ==
The British Board of Film Censors requested that a 45-second kiss be reduced to 20 seconds. They also requested a scene be reshot where a character was beaten to death, which cost the producers £3,000.

== Reception ==
The film caused enormous controversy upon its release, because of the high levels of implied violence and rape that were passed by the British film censors. Though made with a largely British cast, it was set in New York, with the actors often struggling with their American accents.

No Orchids for Miss Blandish received strong criticism for its treatment of violence and sexuality. Cliff Goodwin says that it was "unanimously dubbed 'the worst film ever made'" by British reviewers. The Monthly Film Bulletin called it "the most sickening exhibition of brutality, perversion, sex and sadism ever to be shown on a cinema screen". The Observer reviewer, C. A. Lejeune, described the film as "this repellent piece of work" that "scraped up all the droppings of the nastier type of Hollywood movie". The Sunday Express film reviewer called No Orchids for Miss Blandish "the worst film I have ever seen". The British film critic Derek Winnert quotes reviewer Dilys Powell as writing that the film should be "branded with a 'D' certificate for disgusting". The Australian newspaper The Age also gave a harsh review: "No Orchids for Miss Blandish is not only a disgrace to the studio that made it, but it also reflects on the British industry as a whole ... the entire production is unpardonable". The film was also denounced by the Bishop of London, William Wand, and several UK politicians, including Edith Summerskill.

Later critics have been equally dismissive, though for different reasons. Leslie Halliwell described No Orchids for Miss Blandish as a "hilariously awful gangster film ... one of the worst films ever made". Leonard Maltin in Leonard Maltin's Classic Movie Guide states No Orchids for Miss Blandish "aspires to be a Hollywood film noir and misses by a mile".

A number of cinemas refused to show the film. Despite (or because) of the condemnation, the film was commercially successful and broke box office records in Britain in areas where it was not banned.

== Home media ==
In 2018, a Blu-ray edition of the film was released by Kino Lorber, providing an improved picture and audio quality, though without significant extras beyond the original trailers.

== See also ==
- The Grissom Gang - A 1971 American film adaptation of Chase's novel, directed by Robert Aldrich.
- List of 20th century films considered the worst
