= Susan Travers (actress) =

British actress, born 1939

- Born: Jennifer Susan Leon; 18 February 1939 (age 87); London, England
- Occupation: Actress
- Years active: 1958–1974
- Spouse: Cornel Lucas (m. 1959; died 2012)
- Children: 4, including Charlotte Lucas
- Mother: Linden Travers
- Relatives: Bill Travers (uncle)

Susan Travers (born Jennifer Susan Leon; 18 February 1939) is a retired British film and television actress. She is the daughter of the actress Linden Travers, a niece of Bill Travers, and a cousin of actress Dame Penelope Wilton. She played the role of Arlette Van der Valk, the detective's wife, in the first two series of Van der Valk.

Travers was married to photographer Cornel Lucas. Her daughter, Charlotte Lucas, is also an actress.

== Partial filmography ==
=== Films ===
- The Duke Wore Jeans (1958) as Stewardess
- The Treasure of San Teresa (1959) as Girl at Billie's
- Peeping Tom (1960) as Lorraine the Model (uncredited)
- Sons and Lovers (1960) as Betty
- The Snake Woman (1961) as Atheris
- Out of the Fog (1962) as June Lock
- The Statue (1971) as Mrs. Southwick
- The Abominable Dr. Phibes (1971) as Nurse Allen
- Frenzy (1972) as Victim (uncredited)
- The Happiness Cage (1972) as Lady #2

=== Television ===
- The Adventures of William Tell (1959) episode: The Unwelcome Stranger.
- The Four Just Men (1960) as Receptionist
- The Adventures of Robin Hood (1960) as Serving Girl
- Danger Man (1961) episode "Name, Date and Place" as Nita
- No Hiding Place (1962–63) as Marge Stanley / Frances Lee
- The Avengers (1968) as Nurse Janet Owen
- The Saint (1968) as Laura
- Van der Valk (1972–73) as Arlette van der Valk
- Dixon of Dock Green (1974) as Sally James

== Bibliography ==
- Russell James. Great British Fictional Detectives. Remember When, 2009.
