= No Orchids for Miss Blandish (play) =

No Orchids for Miss Blandish is a 1942 British stage adaptation by James Hadley Chase and Robert Nesbitt of Chase's 1939 novel of the same name. It ran for 203 performances at the Prince of Wales Theatre in the West End.

The play starred Robert Newton as Slim Grisson, Mary Clare as Ma Grisson, and Linden Travers, who reprised her role as Miss Blandish in the 1948 film adaptation. The stage version was well received, particularly in comparison to the film, which was widely denounced as salacious due to the film's portrayal of violence and sexuality.

The story, set in Kansas City, follows the wealthy American Miss Blandish who is kidnapped after a failed robbery, during which her fiance is killed. Her initial captors are subsequently killed during a run-in with another gang, led by Ma Grisson and her son, Slim. Ma sexually molests Miss Blandish and plans to kill her after extorting a ransom from her family. However, Slim opposes his mother's plan as he has fallen in love with Miss Blandish and she subsequently falls in love with Slim. The Blandish family secretary, Mr. Lucie, hires the private detective Dave Fenner to help rescue Miss Blandish. After the bloody rescue attempt, in which Slim is killed, Miss Blandish commits suicide.

In 1950, a French adaptation was presented in Paris starring Nicole Riche, Jean-Marc Tennberg, Renée Gardes and Sacha Tarride, which a review in Carrefour called a masterpiece. Riche disappeared between acts of one of the performances which was canceled and the audience was given their money back. A letter was found in her dressing room condemning her of appearing in an "immoral" production. She appeared two days later stating that she had been kidnapped, released and was found by gypsies in a wood. The story was dismissed by the police as "poppycock" and was seen as an attempt to promote press coverage about the play.

A 1978 revival in Glasgow, in a new adaptation by Robert David MacDonald, featured Pierce Brosnan as Eddie, one of the goons.
