= Lion's Heart (organization) =

Lion's Heart is a national non-profit, teen-based volunteer program headquartered in California. The organization has several chapters in other states, such as Colorado, Connecticut, Florida, Georgia, Massachusetts, New Jersey, New York, Texas, and Wisconsin. It was founded in 2004 as a non-profit, non-fundraising group designed "to inspire teens to have a positive impact in their communities through leadership and participation in volunteering, providing needed resources for causes that ignite their passions."

Lion's Heart enrolled over 22,000 members as of November 2026 since its founding in 2004. Lion's Heart offers teenagers the opportunity to perform community service without fundraising, gain valuable leadership skills, and create an online shareable portfolio for college applications and internships. The organization enrolls teens who are in 6th through 12th grades. Teen members of Lion's Heart have amassed over 2.4 million hours of service to local communities in 32 states in the U.S. since its inception in 2004.

Lion's Heart has become noted in California due to their presence among volunteer groups.

== Organization ==
Each geographical chapter of Lion's Heart has a group for each gender and grade level. Each group has 3-20 Members, along with one parent who is the Class Coordinator and works as a chaperone. They also now offer individual membership for teens who choose to stay on their own.

The Members elect their own officers, lead their own meetings, decide together what community service they want to perform, and who they want to help. Each 'class' is required to meet six times during a year. Every volunteer in Lion's Heart is encouraged to perform at least 25 hours of community service every year.

While the organization is mostly based around group activity, many members choose to do their community service on their own. The corporate office of Lion's Heart, located in Orange County, CA receives many volunteer requests from nonprofits and those opportunities are passed along to each chapter by the organization's Volunteer Outreach team who also finds and curates unique opportunities for them adding to the enrichment of the local opportunities. The members, both individual and group, have a calendar in their account profile with all volunteer opportunities within 20 miles of their location listed for them that they can choose from.

Projects the club has been involved with include blood drives, book collections, hygiene drives for children at the Orangewood Children's Home, beach cleanups, and helping with education projects including tutoring students for free and assisting teachers in classrooms. The service group also gives teens leadership opportunities. The teens elect group leaders and then decide on service projects and determine the necessary logistics.

— Erika Ritchie, The Orange County Register

== National presence in the United States ==
Presently, as of November 2026, Lion's Heart has 516 groups in 220 chapters across 32 states in the U.S. Cumulatively, Lion's Heart Members have provided more than 2.4 million service hours to communities across the nation.

What began as a single chapter of 20 seventh-grade boys in Orange County has spread to more than 47 Lion's Heart chapters for boys and girls in 10 states.

— Mallory Bowles, Orange County Register

They have worked with several other volunteer and charity organizations, including the Pediatric Cancer Research Foundation, Education for the Children, Rotary Club, Bethany's Gate, Boys Town, Orange County Food Bank, Ronald McDonald House Charities, Toys for Tots, Make-A-Wish Foundation, National Beach Clean Up — Surfrider Foundation, Capistrano Unified School District, Saddleback Valley School District, Bell Tower Regional Community Center, Pacific Marine Mammal Center Laguna Beach, Rose Parade, Adopt-A-Beach, Zero Trash, Second Harvest Food Bank, Habitat for Humanity, and American Red Cross Blood Drives.

== Awards ==
Lion's Heart has their own reward system for their members. Members who are active for the entire 6 years are given what is called the 'Golden Lion Award'. At the end of a each year, members are recognized: Hours of community service, officer positions held, as well as any other awards they have received.

Other awards include the Torchbearer Award and nominations for the President's Volunteer Service Award (paused by the Trump administration in 2024).

== Community recognition ==
Lion's Heart has garnered local appreciation from several communities in which they're based. Members have been honored in Ridgefield CT, North Fulton, Georgia, Mission Viejo CA, as well as many others. The founder, Terry Corwin, has been awarded two PTA Honorary Service Awards (2000, 2007), recognized by the Capistrano United Schools District for helping save the Class Size Reduction Program (2003), named the Grand Marshal of the 4th of July parade in Coto de Caza, CA (2009), and was honored along with her husband, Clay Corwin, with the Distinguished Lifetime Advocates Award by The Education for the Children Foundation (2012). National Philanthropy Day of Orange County, CA, awarded Lion's Heart with the Outstanding Youth Group Award (2009). Terry Corwin was named one of "Twenty Women to Watch" by OC Metro Magazine (2013), appeared on the Katie Couric Show featured in "Women Who Should be Famous" for her work with Lion's Heart (2013), and was presented with The President's Volunteer Service Award for "Lifetime Achievement" (2014), and was award the Daily Point of Light Award (2015). Terry Corwin was on the cover of Orange Coast Magazine in March 2026 for her achievements in philanthropy.
