= The Flesh of the Orchid (novel) =

1948 novel by James Hadley Chase

- First edition
- Author: James Hadley Chase
- Original title: The Flesh of the Orchid
- Language: English
- Publisher: Jarrolds
- Publication date: September 1948
- Publication place: UK
- ISBN: 9780709183020
- Preceded by: No Orchids for Miss Blandish

The Flesh of the Orchid is a 1948 thriller novel by British author James Hadley Chase. It is a sequel to the book No Orchids for Miss Blandish by the same author.

== Summary ==
The book follows events 20 years after those in No Orchids for Miss Blandish, with Miss Blandish's daughter Carol Blandish as the main protagonist, apparently alone and helpless, but with homicidal and aggressive tendencies, who as fate would have it, sets off into the world with unscrupulous people behind her for selfish reasons, and Carol tackling them for survival. With time, from being the 'hunted', Carol soon becomes the 'hunter'.

== Plot ==
Twenty years after the events in No Orchids for Miss Blandish, Miss Blandish's daughter and John Blandish's teenage grand daughter Carol Blandish is lodged in a lunatic asylum. John Blandish refuses to have anything to do with her as she is an illegitimate child born to his now deceased daughter and Slim Grisson when she was held captive by the latter 20 years ago. Carol is sent to the asylum when she begins to display homicidal tendencies like Slim Grisson and a tendency to attack people's eyes. Nevertheless, Mr Blandish, before his demise, puts his entire fortune in her name and in the care of a trust that wishes to keep the money and ensures that she is confined as an 'insane person', lest she claim her due inheritance one day.

Unfortunately Carol escapes from the Asylum one night, and this sets off many people on her trail – Sheriff Kamp and the psychiatrist who want her back lest she be kidnapped for money, by the trust lest she becomes de-certified as a psychiatric patient after 14 days out-of-asylum by law, a journalist Phil Magrath who wants to make it big for his paper by grabbing the news first, and soon by ruthless murderers who want to claim her money.

Carol is found by a speeding truck driver in the storm, which she takes over and topples over a valley, killing the driver and going unconscious. She is then found by estranged brothers Steve and Roy, who take her to Steve's cabin. Roy is hiding from Max and Frank – the Sullivan Brothers, two dreaded hitmen out to kill him on contract for betraying Roy's boss. Steve nurses Carol to health, who becomes amnesic and falls in love with him.

The Sullivan brothers find and attack Steve's cabin and kill Roy. Steve and Carol escape but Steve gets shot. She seeks help, with the Sullivans behind them. Both are found by Phil Magrath and given shelter. Steve recuperates. The Sullivans hunt for him and Carol as they are now witnesses to Roy's murder. Eventually they locate them lodged in Phil Magrath's mistress home. They attack and kill Steve and break away before the cops arrive, but not before Carol manages to blind Frank Sullivan. Carol is now in custody of Phil who looks after her. But she is aggrieved over Steve's death, and vows revenge against the Sullivan brothers.

Months later the Sullivans are in another city. Frank Sullivan is blind and having a nervous breakdown, and Max Sullivan is getting tired of him. He continues to work, leaving Frank in a house to take care of himself with a maid. Frank is one day visited by a lady, who befriends him and convinces him to relieve his maid. This lady happens to be Carol Blandish in a new 'Avatar', who has been hunting the Sullivans and has found Frank, who cannot recognise her. She pretends to look after him, takes him and drops him midway in the city traffic, getting him killed by speeding vehicles. Max learns of Frank's death but is remorseless. He eventually learns that Carol Blandish is behind him and Frank for revenge. The rest follows Carol's quest for revenge as the predator and Max Sullivan's survival as a prey.

== Character list ==
- Carol Blandish - Miss Blandish's daughter, the protagonist
- Kemp - Sheriff
- Steve - Carol's love interest
- Roy - Petty criminal and Steve's brother
- Phil Magarth - Journalist
- Joe - Male nurse
- Sullivan Brothers Max and Frank - Professional hitmen whose existence is not fully known, who do not leave any paid contract undone and wipe out all evidence of their work.

== In media ==
The 1975 film La Chair de l'orchidée (The Flesh of the Orchid) is an adaptation of the book.

== Sources ==
- https://mastermindbooks.com/james-hadley-chase-books/270-the-flesh-of-the-orchid.html
- https://bloodymurder.wordpress.com/2014/04/01/no-orchids-for-miss-blandish-1948-tuesdays-overlooked-film/
- https://books.google.co.in/books/about/The_Flesh_of_the_Orchid.html?id=52HJAAAACAAJ&source=kp_book_description&redir_esc=y
- https://www.fantasticfiction.com/c/james-hadley-chase/flesh-of-orchid.htm
- https://www.angelfire.com/celeb2/hadleychase/flesh_orchid.htm
