= Lionheart (1968 film) =

1968 children's film by Michael Forlong

- Opening titles
- Directed by: Michael Forlong
- Written by: Michael Forlong; Alexander Fullerton
- Based on: 1965 Alexander Fullerton novel
- Produced by: Michael Forlong
- Starring: James Forlong; Louise Rush; Robert Dean; Pauline Yates
- Cinematography: Terry Maher
- Edited by: Chris Burt
- Music by: Cyril Stapleton
- Production company: Michael Forlong Productions
- Distributed by: Children's Film Foundation
- Release date: 1968
- Running time: 64 minutes
- Country: United Kingdom
- Language: English

Lionheart is a 1968 children's adventure film directed by Michael Forlong and starring James Furlong, Louise Rush, Robert Dean and Pauline Yates. It was written by Forlong based on the 1965 novel Lionheart by Alexander Fullerton.

== Synopsis ==
A young boy rescues and protects an escaped circus lion.

== Cast ==
- Simba as the Lion
- James Forlong as Andrew Fowler
- Robert Dean as father
- Pauline Yates as mother
- Robert Davis as Corporal
- Joe Brown as Private Worms
- Ben Aris as Captain Harris
- Ian Jessup as Robert
- Wilfrid Brambell as Dingett
- Louise Rush as Belinda
- Jimmy Edwards as butcher
- Virginia Clay as Miss Wilson
- Gwen Evans as Robert's mother
- Irene Handl as Lil
- Nyoka as himself
- Leslie Dwyer as carpenter

== Production ==
Sponsored by the Children's Film Foundation, the film was classified as "universal" suitable for audiences aged four years and over.

== Reception ==
The Monthly Film Bulletin wrote: "A rather leisurely children's film whose main attraction is a huge lion, magnificent in appearance but disappointingly (if understandably) lethargic in performance. Guest appearances from Jimmy Edwards, Irene Handl and Joe Brown eke out a very flimsy narrative; and though the few snatches of suspense and bits of mild comedy may be acceptable makeweights for younger children, the pace is generally too slow to generate more than a modicum of excitement."
