= Billlie =

South Korean girl group

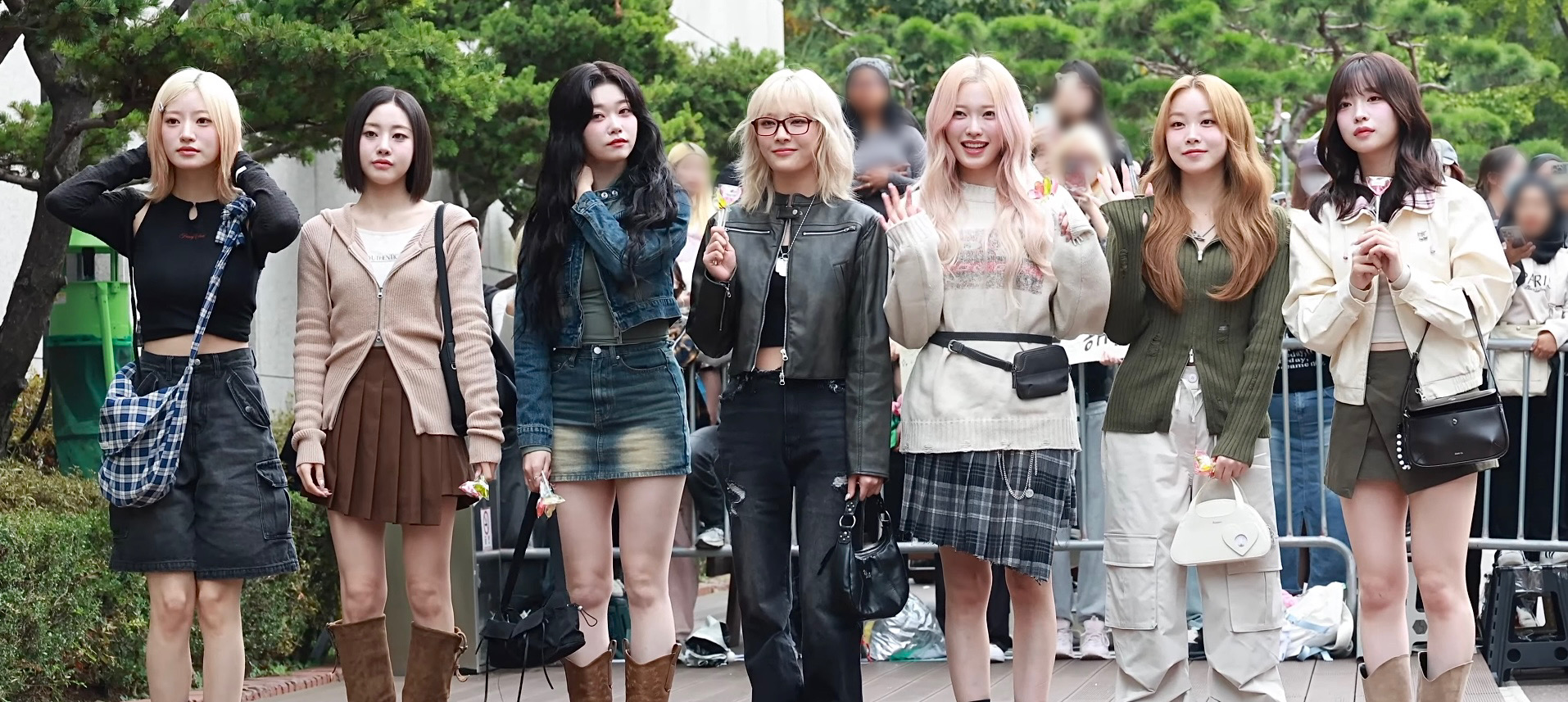
- Billlie in October 2024; L–R, Siyoon, Sheon, Tsuki, Moon Sua, Haram, Suhyeon and Haruna

Background information
- Origin: Seoul, South Korea
- Genres: K-pop; R&B
- Years active: 2021–present
- Labels: Mystic Story; Victor
- Spinoffs: Moon Sua x Siyoon
- Members: Moon Sua; Suhyeon; Haram; Tsuki; Sheon; Siyoon; Haruna
- Website: Official website

Billlie (Korean: 빌리; RR: Billi; stylized as Bi11lie or Billlǃə) is a South Korean girl group formed by Mystic Story. Billlie debuted on November 10, 2021, with the extended play (EP) The Billage of Perception: Chapter One. The group originally consisted of six members: Moon Sua, Suhyeon, Haram, Tsuki, Siyoon and Haruna. A seventh member, Sheon, later joined the group.

== Name ==
The name Billlie is spelled with three Ls due to the fact that the name can be broken down into 'Bi' (Korean word for rain), '11', and 'lie' — Bi11lie. The number '11' came from their group's legend; "When the 11th bell rings in the middle of a purple rain, something strange happens", where the members lie about what happened in order to keep the event a secret. The name also reflects their "B-sides, the inner-self that everyone has inside them", which they express in hope to empathize with the audience.

== Career ==
=== Pre-debut ===
The members of Billlie were known as Mystic Rookies — a rookie development program under Mystic Story. On September 14, Mystic Story announced plans to debut Mystic rookies in November 2021. On October 11, it was revealed that the group would be named 'Billlie'.

Prior to debut, Moon Sua was a YG Entertainment trainee for 10 years. She participated in the music competition program Unpretty Rapstar 2 finishing as the third runner-up. Suhyeon participated in the Mnet survival program Produce 101 placing 69th and eliminated in the fifth episode. She also participated in the JTBC survival program Mix Nine and starred in the web drama A-Teen in 2018, and its 2019 sequel A-Teen 2. Haram and Tsuki are former SM Entertainment trainees. Additionally, Tsuki worked as a model for the magazine Popteen and released the single "Magic" with the modeling group MAGICOUR in 2020. Sheon participated in the Mnet survival program Girls Planet 999, and was eliminated in the final episode placing tenth. Siyoon participated in the talent show K-pop Star 5 and also worked as a model for the magazine Popteen.

=== 2021–2023: Debut ===
On October 28, 2021, it was announced that their debut EP The Billage of Perception: Chapter One would be released on November 10. A fan song titled "Flowerld", which was also included on the EP, was also released on the same day. On November 10, their debut EP The Billage of Perception: Chapter One was released featuring lead single "Ring X Ring" and five B-side tracks. On November 19, it was announced that Kim Su-yeon, who had participated in Girls Planet 999, would join the group under the stage name Sheon (션) as the seventh member, and would officially join the group for their next album. On November 27, Sheon made a surprise appearance performing title track "Ring X Ring" along with the other members on South Korean music show Show! Music Core, marking her first appearance with the group. On December 14, the group released their first digital single album The Collective Soul and Unconscious: Snowy Night with "Snowy Night" as the lead single. The single is the group's first release to feature member Sheon.

On February 11, 2022, it was announced that Billlie would be releasing their second EP The Collective Soul And Unconscious: Chapter One, featuring lead single "GingaMingaYo (The Strange World)" on February 23. On March 1, the group released their first soundtrack album The Collective Soul and Unconscious: Chapter One Original Soundtrack from "What Is Your B?". On August 8, it was announced the group would be releasing a direct sequel to their first EP. On August 16, it was announced that their third EP The Billage of Perception: Chapter Two, featuring lead single "Ring Ma Bell (What a Wonderful World)", would be released on August 31.

On February 7, 2023, it was announced the group would be releasing their fourth EP. On March 6, it was announced that their fourth EP The Billage of Perception: Chapter Three, featuring lead single "Eunoia", would be released on March 28. On April 20, Mystic Story announced that the group's activities have been halted, due to the sudden death of Moon Sua's brother Moonbin of Astro. Subsequently on April 25, Mystic Story announced that promotions for the EP have concluded, and that member Moon Sua would be taking time off, with the remaining 6 members to continue activities. On June 15, It was announced that Suhyeon would also be going on hiatus, for health reasons. The group released their first single album Side-B: Memoirs of Echo Unseen. The album's single "BYOB (Bring Your Own Best Friend)", together with its English-language version, was pre-released on September 27. The lead single "Dang! (Hocus Pocus)", together with the entire album was released on October 23. Members Moon Sua and Suhyeon would not be involved in this release due to their hiatuses from health issues.

=== 2024–present: First sub-unit and first studio album ===
On April 12, 2024, it was announced that members Moon Sua and Suhyeon would resume activities after being on hiatus due to health issues. On October 2, it was announced that the group would be releasing their fifth EP Appendix: Of All We Have Lost on October 16, with the pre-release single "Trampoline" releasing on October 11. The music video teaser for the lead single "Remembrance Candy" (Korean: 기억사탕; RR: Gieoksatang) includes a special narration by singer-songwriter IU, who also wrote the lyrics for the song.

On April 1, 2025, the group announced that they would debut their first sub-unit consisting of members Moon Sua and Siyoon on April 7, with the release of the single "Snap" featuring Sokodomo.

On January 19, 2026, it was announced that Billlie would release a pre-release single titled "Cloud Palace (False Awakening)" on January 27, ahead of their upcoming album The Collective Soul and Unconscious: Chapter Two. On April 15, the album was announced and subsequently released on May 6 as the group's first studio album.

== Members ==
- Moon Sua (문수아)
- Suhyeon (수현)
- Haram (하람)
- Tsuki (츠키)
- Sheon (션)
- Siyoon (시윤)
- Haruna (하루나)

== Discography ==
=== Studio albums ===
List of studio albums, showing selected details, selected chart positions, and sales figures
Title	Details	Peak chart positions	Sales
Title	Details	KOR	Sales
The Collective Soul and Unconscious: Chapter Two	Released: May 6, 2026; Label: Mystic Story; Formats: CD, digital download, streaming; Track listing: 1. "$ecret No More"; 2. "Zap"; 3. "Work"; 4. "TBD"; 5. "B'yond Me"; 6. "Soupasta"; 7. "Off-Air"; 8. "Zap" (Ultraviolet remix); 9. "Work" (Anonymous remix); 10. "Soupasta" (Unconscious remix); 11. "Domino (Butterfly Effect)" (Korean version); 12. "Cloud Palace" (Collective soul remix)	14	KOR: 31,425

=== Extended plays ===
List of extended plays, showing selected details, selected chart positions, and sales figures
Title	Details	Peak chart positions		Sales
Title	Details	KOR	JPN	Sales
The Billage of Perception: Chapter One	Released: November 10, 2021; Label: Mystic Story; Formats: CD, digital download, streaming	12	—	KOR: 24,698
The Collective Soul and Unconscious: Chapter One	Released: February 23, 2022; Label: Mystic Story; Formats: CD, digital download, streaming	5	18	KOR: 89,362; JPN: 2,681
The Billage of Perception: Chapter Two	Released: August 31, 2022; Label: Mystic Story; Formats: CD, digital download, streaming	3	23	KOR: 91,070; JPN: 2,441
The Billage of Perception: Chapter Three	Released: March 28, 2023; Label: Mystic Story; Formats: CD, digital download, streaming	5	26	KOR: 91,143; JPN: 1,676
Appendix: Of All We Have Lost	Released: October 16, 2024; Label: Mystic Story; Formats: CD, digital download, streaming; Track listing: 1. "Remembrance Candy" (기억사탕); 2. "Trampoline"; 3. "Bluerose"; 4. "BTTB (Back to the Basics)"; 5. "Shame"; 6. "Dream Diary (Etching Mémoires of Midnight Rêverie)"	14	—	KOR: 46,055
Japanese
Knock-on Effect	Released: February 7, 2024; Label: Victor Entertainment; Formats: CD, digital download, streaming; Track listing: 1. "Domino (Butterfly Effect)" (Japanese version); 2. "Dang! (Hocus Pocus)" (Japanese version); 3. "BYOB (Bring Your Own Best Friend)" (Japanese version); 4. "Ring Ma Bell (What a Wonderful World)" (Japanese version); 5. "GingaMingaYo (The Strange World)" (Japanese version)	—	14	JPN: 3,791
"—" denotes a recording that did not chart or was not released in that territory

=== Single albums ===
List of single albums, showing selected details, selected chart positions, and sales figures
Title	Details	Peak chart positions		Sales
Title	Details	KOR	JPN	Sales
Track by Yoon: Patbingsu	Released: July 14, 2022; Label: Mystic Story; Formats: CD, digital download, streaming; Track listing: 1. "Patbingsu" (팥빙수); 2. "Highway Romance" (고속도로 로맨스)	7	—	KOR: 54,048
Side-B: Memoirs of Echo Unseen	Released: October 23, 2023; Label: Mystic Story; Formats: CD, digital download, streaming; Track listing: 1. "Dang! (Hocus Pocus)"; 2. "BYOB (Bring Your Own Best Friend)"; 3. "Dang! (Hocus Pocus)" (English version); 4. "BYOB (Bring Your Own Best Friend)" (English version)	6	—	KOR: 43,318
Japanese
GingaMingaYo (The Strange World): Japanese ver.	Released: May 17, 2023; Label: Victor Entertainment; Formats: CD, digital download, streaming; Track listing: 1. "GingaMingaYo (The Strange World)" (Japanese version); 2. "Everybody's Got a $ecret" (Japanese version); 3. "GingaMingaYo (The Strange World)" (Japanese version; Inst.); 4. "Everybody's Got a $ecret" (Japanese version; Inst.)	—	4	JPN: 12,063
"—" denotes a recording that did not chart or was not released in that territory

=== Soundtrack albums ===
List of soundtrack albums, showing selected details
Title	Details
The Collective Soul and Unconscious: Chapter One Original Soundtrack from "What Is Your B?"	Released: March 1, 2022; Label: Mystic Story; Formats: Digital download, streaming
The Billage of Perception: Chapter Two Original Soundtrack from "The End of the World and the Awakening"	Released: September 8, 2022; Label: Mystic Story; Formats: Digital download, streaming

=== Singles ===
List of singles, showing year released, selected chart positions, and name of the album
Title	Year	Peak chart positions			Album
Title	Year	KOR Down.	JPN	JPN Heat.	Album
"Ring X Ring"	2021	167	—	—	The Billage of Perception: Chapter One
"Snowy Night" (Note: "Snowy Night" was released as the lead track of the digital single album The Collective Soul and Unconscious: Snowy Night.)	2021	—	—	—	Non-album single
"GingaMingaYo (The Strange World)"	2022	92	4	6	The Collective Soul and Unconscious: Chapter One
"Patbingsu" (팥빙수) (with Yoon Jong-shin)	2022	144	—	—	Track by Yoon: Patbingsu
"Ring Ma Bell (What a Wonderful World)"	2022	32	—	—	The Billage of Perception: Chapter Two
"Eunoia"	2023	47	—	—	The Billage of Perception: Chapter Three
"Dang! (Hocus Pocus)"	2023	60	—	—	Side B: Memoirs of Echo Unseen
"The Soul Savior: I Don't Need a Superman"	2023	197	—	—	The Billlie's Odditorium' The First Edition
"January 0th (A Hope Song)"	2024	75	—	—	The Billlie's Odditorium' The Second Edition
"Domino (Butterfly Effect)" (Japanese version)	2024	—	—	—	Knock-on Effect
"Trampoline"	2024	72	—	—	Appendix: Of All We Have Lost
"Remembrance Candy" (기억사탕)	2024	40	—	—	Appendix: Of All We Have Lost
"Cloud Palace" (Note: "Cloud Palace" was released as the lead track of the pre-release single "Cloud Palace (False Awakening)".)	2026	50	—	—	The Collective Soul and Unconscious: Chapter Two
"Zap"	2026	43	—	—	The Collective Soul and Unconscious: Chapter Two
"Work"	2026	32	—	—	The Collective Soul and Unconscious: Chapter Two
"—" denotes a recording that did not chart or was not released in that territory

=== Other charted songs ===
List of singles, showing year released, selected chart positions, and name of the album
Title	Year	Peak chart positions	Album
Title	Year	KOR Down.	Album
"Enchanted Night (白夜)"	2023	121	The Billage of Perception: Chapter Three
"Lionheart (The Real Me)"	2023	123	The Billage of Perception: Chapter Three
"Various and Precious (Moment of Inertia)"	2023	130	The Billage of Perception: Chapter Three
"Extra-ordinary"	2023	131	The Billage of Perception: Chapter Three
"Nevertheless"	2023	126	The Billage of Perception: Chapter Three
"BYOB (Bring Your Own Best Friend)"	2023	105	Side-B: Memoirs of Echo Unseen
"$ecret No More"	2026	169	The Collective Soul and Unconscious: Chapter Two
"TBD"	2026	159	The Collective Soul and Unconscious: Chapter Two
"B'yond Me"	2026	178	The Collective Soul and Unconscious: Chapter Two
"Soupasta"	2026	175	The Collective Soul and Unconscious: Chapter Two
"Off-Air"	2026	170	The Collective Soul and Unconscious: Chapter Two
"Domino (Butterfly Effect)" (Korean version)	2026	197	The Collective Soul and Unconscious: Chapter Two

== Videography ==
=== Music videos ===
Title	Year	Director	Ref.
"Ring X Ring"	2021	Hwang Suah	
"Snowy Night"	2021	Zanybros	
"GingaMingaYo (The Strange World)"	2022	Zanybros	
"Patbingsu"	2022	Zanybros	
"Ring Ma Bell (What a Wonderful World)"	2022	Zanybros	
"Eunoia"	2023	Kwak Doori (Segaji Video)	
"GingaMingaYo (The Strange World)" (Japanese version)	2023	Unknown	
"BYOB (Bring Your Own Best Friend)"	2023	Kino, Lord, Won (Milpowder)	
"Dang! (Hocus Pocus)"	2023	Zanybros	
"Domino (Butterfly Effect)" (Japanese version)	2024	Kino, Lord, Won (Milpowder)	
"Trampoline"	2024	Kino, Lord, Won (Milpowder)	
"Remembrance Candy" (기억사탕)	2024	Kino, Lord, Won, Jjirun (Milpowder)	
"Zap"	2026	Mingyu Kang (Gew)	

== Accolades ==
=== Awards and nominations ===
Name of the award ceremony, year presented, category, nominee of the award, and the result of the nomination
Award ceremony	Year	Category	Nominee / Work	Result	Ref.
Asia Artist Awards	2022	Potential Awards – Music	Billlie	Won	
Asia Star Entertainer Awards	2024	Hot Icon	Billlie	Won	
Brand Customer Loyalty Awards	2022	Rookie of the Year (Female)	Billlie	Nominated	
Korea First Brand Awards	2023	Female Idol (Rising Star)	Billlie	Won	
Hanteo Music Awards	2021	Rookie Award – Female Group	Billlie	Nominated	
Hanteo Music Awards	2022	Emerging Artist Award	Billlie	Won	
Hanteo Music Awards	2022	Main Award	Billlie	Nominated	
Hanteo Music Awards	2024	Post Generation Award	Billlie	Nominated	
Hanteo Music Awards	2024	WhosFandom Award – Female	Belllie've	Nominated	
Hanteo Music Awards	2025	Best Artist Pick	Billlie	Nominated	
Hanteo Music Awards	2025	Next Wave	Billlie	Won	
Melon Music Awards	2022	New Artist of the Year	Billlie	Nominated	
Mnet Japan Fan's Choice Awards	2021	Female Rookie of the Year	Billlie	Nominated	
Seoul Music Awards	2024	Best Performance Award	Billlie	Won	

=== Listicles ===
Name of publisher, year listed, name of listicle, and placement
Publisher	Year	Listicle	Placement	Ref.
Teen Vogue	2024	12 Girl Groups to Watch in 2024	Placed	
