= Linden Travers =

British actress (1913–2001)

- Born: Florence Lindon-Travers; 27 May 1913; Houghton-le-Spring, County Durham, England
- Died: 23 October 2001 (aged 88); Cornwall, England
- Occupation: Actress
- Years active: 1935–1960
- Spouses: Guy Leon (m. 1936, divorced) James Holman (m. 1948; died 1974)
- Children: 2, including Susan Travers
- Relatives: Bill Travers (brother); Charlotte Lucas (granddaughter); Penelope Wilton (niece); Angela Morant (niece); Richard Morant (nephew)

Florence Lindon-Travers (27 May 1913 – 23 October 2001), known professionally as Linden Travers, was a British actress.

== Early life and career ==
Travers was born in Houghton-le-Spring, County Durham, the daughter of Florence (née Wheatley) and William Halton Lindon-Travers. She was the elder sister of Bill Travers, and attended La Sagesse School. She made her first stage appearance at the Newcastle Playhouse in 1933. She made her West End debut the following year in Ivor Novello's Murder in Mayfair and appeared in her first film, Children of the Fog in 1935.

While she had leading roles in her earlier film career, such as The Last Adventurers (1937), Brief Ecstasy (1937) and The Terror (1938); she was mainly a supporting actress. One of her most widely seen performances was as "Mrs" Todhunter in Alfred Hitchcock's The Lady Vanishes (1938). She also appeared in Carol Reed's Bank Holiday (1938) and The Stars Look Down (1940), as well as The Ghost Train (1941), Quartet (1948) and The Bad Lord Byron (1949).

In the forties she played Miss Blandish in both the well-received 1942 stage adaptation in which she starred with Robert Newton which had 203 performances at the Prince of Wales Theatre, London and the widely panned 1948 film version of James Hadley Chase's 1939 novel No Orchids for Miss Blandish (which Travers felt to have been her best film).

== Personal life ==
Travers was married twice: first to Guy Leon (whom she met while acting in Murder in Mayfair, since his sister was also in the cast), and then to James Holman in 1948.

She mostly retired from acting in 1948, after her second marriage (although she continued to make occasional TV appearances), and in 1999, she took part in the television programme Reputations: Alfred Hitchcock, paying tribute to the man who had directed her sixty years earlier.

A talented artist, Travers and her sisters set up an art gallery in Kensington in 1969.

In 1974, after her second husband died, Travers travelled for some time, before moving to St Ives to paint. She was also a qualified hypnotist, and studied psychotherapy.

She died in Cornwall, aged 88, in 2001. Her daughter Susan Travers and granddaughter Charlotte Lucas also became actresses.

== Filmography ==
- Children of the Fog (1935)
- Wednesday's Luck (1936)
- Double Alibi (1937)
- London Melody (1937)
- Against the Tide (1937)
- The Last Adventurers (1937)
- Brief Ecstasy (1937)
- Bank Holiday (1938)
- The Terror (1938)
- The Lady Vanishes (1938) as "Mrs" Toddhunter
- Almost a Honeymoon (1938)
- Inspector Hornleigh on Holiday (1939)
- The Stars Look Down (1940)
- The Ghost Train (1941)
- South American George (1941)
- The Missing Million (1942)
- The Seventh Survivor (1942)
- Beware of Pity (1946)
- Jassy (1947)
- Master of Bankdam (1947)
- Quartet (1948)
- No Orchids for Miss Blandish (1948)
- The Bad Lord Byron (1949)
- Christopher Columbus (1949)
- Don't Ever Leave Me (1949)
- The Vise (1955, TV series)
- Sea Hunt (1960, TV series)
