= The Billage of Perception: Chapter One =

EP by Billlie
- Released: November 10, 2021
- Length: 19:24
- Language: Korean
- Label: Mystic Story
- Producer: Han Peacedelic Jungsu

Billlie chronology
The Billage of Perception: Chapter One (2021)	The Collective Soul and Unconscious: Chapter One (2022)

Singles from The Billage of Perception: Chapter One
- 1. "Flowerld" Released: October 27, 2021; 2. "Ring X Ring" Released: November 10, 2021

The Billage of Perception: Chapter One is the debut extended play (EP) by South Korean girl group Billlie. It was released by Mystic Story on November 10, 2021, and distributed by Kakao Entertainment. The album consists of six tracks with "Ring X Ring" serving as its lead single and also the previously released song "Flowerld" but with modified version.

== Background and composition ==
On October 28, 2021, Mystic Story announced that Billlie, previously known as "Mystic Rookies", would be debuting with their first EP in early November. The same day, a B-side of the EP, "Flowerld", was pre-released alongside a lyric video as a gift for fans. The Billage of Perception: Chapter One and the music video for its lead single, "Ring X Ring" were released simultaneously on November 10. The title track was composed and arranged by Lee Min-soo with lyrics by Kim Eana and its music video was directed by Hwang Su-ah: they are collectively known as "Team IU", as they have worked on many tracks for the South Korean singer and actress IU. The members Siyoon and Moon Sua also contributed to make rap parts. The choreography was handled by Lia Kim, who leads 1Million Dance Studio. "Ring x Ring" contains a mysterious story surrounding what happened in a village, a story which marks the start to an upcoming story universe.

== Commercial performance ==
The Billage of Perception: Chapter One sold 24,698 copies in South Korea and it peaked at number 12 on the Gaon Album Chart in the issue dated November 7–13. Its lead single "Ring X Ring" did not enter the Gaon Digital Chart, but appeared at number 167 on the component Download Chart.

== Promotion ==
A few hours ahead of the release of The Billage of Perception: Chapter One, a showcase was held in live-streaming. The group promoted the lead single on leading music programs and the B-side "Flipping a Coin" on 3 South Korean music programs, as M Countdown, Show Champion and The Show. Their last performance was on Arirang TV's Fly High K-pop Concert.

== Track listing ==
The Billage of Perception: Chapter One track listing
No.	Title	Lyrics	Music	Arrangement	Length
1.	"Ring X Ring"	Kim Eana; Moon Sua; Siyoon	Lee Min-soo	Lee Min-soo	3:20
2.	"Flipping a Coin"	Llano	Alexander Karlsson (JeL); Alexej Viktorovitch (JeL); Bobii Lewis; Cazzi Opeia; Ellen Berg	JeL	3:15
3.	"Flowerld"	Hoff; KZ	KZ; Kim Tae-young; Hoff	KZ; Kim Tae-young	3:23
4.	"The Eleventh Day"	Le'mon	Audi Mok; Tilla Hanna; Ahmad Izham Omar; Zaydro	Audi Mok; Tilla Hanna; Ahmad Izham Omar; Zaydro	3:31
5.	"Everybody's Got a Secret"	Llano	C-Young; Anna Timgren	C-Young	3:02
6.	"The Rumor"	Kim Eana; Moon Sua; Siyoon	Anne Judith Stokke Wik; Ronny Svendsen; Nermin Harambasic; Bardur Haberg; Samaj Ai Bandeh	Bardur Haberg	2:50
Total length:					19:24

Notes

- "Ring X Ring", and "Flowerld" are stylized in all caps.
- "The Eleventh Day", and "The Rumor" are stylized in all lowercase.
- "Flipping a Coin" is stylized as "flipp!ng a coin".
- "Everybody's Got a Secret" is stylized as "everybody's got a $ECRET".

== Charts ==
=== Weekly chart ===
Weekly chart performance for The Billage of Perception: Chapter One
Chart (2021)	Peak position
South Korean Albums (Gaon)	12

=== Monthly chart ===
Monthly chart performance for The Billage of Perception: Chapter One
Chart (2021)	Peak position
South Korean Albums (Gaon)	52

== Sales ==
Sales for The Billage of Perception: Chapter One
Region	Certification	Certified units/sales
South Korea	—	24,698

== Release history ==
Release history for The Billage of Perception: Chapter One
Region	Date	Format	Label	Ref.
Various	November 10, 2021	Digital download; streaming; CD	Mystic Story; Kakao Entertainment	
