= Lionheart (2016 film) =

Lionheart (2016)
- Directed by: Fro Rojas
- Written by: Oscar DeRosa Orlando Cicilia III
- Produced by: Oscar DeRosa; Orlando Cicilia III
- Starring: Oscar DeRosa; Marc Macaulay
- Cinematography: Sherman Johnson
- Edited by: Timothy Dowling
- Music by: Orlando Cicilia III
- Production company: Aeternum Films
- Release date: 2016
- Running time: 13 minutes
- Country: United States
- Language: English

Lionheart is a 2016 American boxing film short written and produced by Oscar DeRosa and Orlando Cicilia III. The film stars Oscar DeRosa and Marc Macaulay. The film portrays struggling professional boxer Max Rossi who is finally presented with the fight he's been waiting for that will launch his career to the next level but when he is suddenly confronted with a life-changing opportunity he must decide which path to take.
