= Alexander Fullerton =

British writer (1924–2008)

Alexander Fullerton (1924–2008) was a British author of naval and other fiction. Born in 1924 in Suffolk and brought up in France, he was a cadet during the years 1938–1941 at the Royal Naval College, Dartmouth from the age of thirteen. He went to sea serving first in the battleship Queen Elizabeth in the Mediterranean, and spent the rest of the war at sea – mostly under it, in submarines. He served as gunnery and torpedo officer of HM Submarine Seadog in the Far East, 1944–1945, in which capacity he was mentioned in dispatches for distinguished service.

== Authorship ==
Alexander Fullerton's first novel, Surface! – based on his experiences in Seadog – was published in 1953. It became an immediate bestseller, with five reprints in six weeks, and sold over 500,000 copies. From 1967, he lived solely on his writing, and is claimed (by his publishers) to be one of the most borrowed authors from British libraries.

== Bibliography ==
=== The Nicholas Everard Series ===
Alexander Fullerton's nine-volume Mariner of England series featuring his hero Nicholas Everard has secured his reputation as one of the finest of modern writers about naval warfare. As well as individual volumes, the series is also published in three omnibus volumes, each comprising three novels.

- The Blooding of the Guns (1976)
- Sixty Minutes for St George (1977)
- Patrol to the Golden Horn (1978)
- Storm Force to Narvik (1979)
- Last Lift from Crete (1980)
- All the Drowning Seas (1981)
- A Share of Honour (1982)
- The Torch Bearers (1983)
- The Gatecrashers (1984)

=== The SBS Trilogy ===
- Special Deliverance (1986)
- Special Dynamic (1987)
- Special Deception (1988)

=== The Rosie Ewing Quartet and Prequel ===
A series of novels about a female agent of the World War II British Special Operations Executive ("SOE") in Nazi-occupied France. Fullerton's protagonist, Rosie Ewing, may have been inspired by the real-life experiences of decorated SOE agent Odette Sansom Hallowes.

- Into the Fire (1995)
- Return to the Field (1997)
- In at the Kill (1999)
- Single to Paris (2001)

After writing the first four Rosie Ewing novels, Fullerton wrote a prequel in 2006, using the literary conceit that the real-life "Rosie" had contacted him to tell the story of her first mission:

- Staying Alive (2006)

Related novel: Fullerton's 1996 book, "Band of Brothers," about the efforts of a force of British gunboats and torpedo boats to sink a German U-boat supply vessel, has as its protagonist a major character (naval officer Ben Quarry) from the Rosie Ewing quartet.

=== Other Novels ===
- Surface! (1953)
- Bury the Past (1954)
- Old Moke (1954)
- No Man's Mistress (1955)
- A Wren Called Smith (1957)
- The White Men Sang (1958) - a fictionalised account of the Shangani Patrol, the Rhodesian equivalent of Custer's last Stand or the Alamo
- The Yellow Ford (1959)
- The Waiting Game (1961)
- Mantrap (1961)
- Soldier from the Sea (1962)
- The Thunder and the Flame (1964)
- Lionheart (1965)
- Chief Executive (1969)
- The Publisher (1969)
- Store (1971)
- The Escapists (1972)
- Other Men's Wives (1973)
- Piper's Leave (1974)
- Regenesis (1983)
- The Aphrodite Cargo (1985)
- Look to the Wolves (1988) (book 1 of 2 in the Russian Battles series)
- Johnson's Bird (1989)
- Bloody Sunset (1991) (book 2 of 2 in the Russian Battles series)
- Love for an Enemy (1993)
- Not Thinking of Death (1994) (a fictionalised account of the sinking of HMS Thetis (N25) during trials)
- Band of Brothers (1996) (set in the "Rosie Ewing" universe—protagonist Ben Quarry is an important character in Fullerton's "Rosie Ewing" series)
- Final Dive (1998)
- Wave Cry (1999)
- The Floating Madhouse (2000)
- Flight to Mons (2003)
- Westbound, Warbound (2003) (book 1 of 2 in the Andy Holt series)
- Stark Realities (2004)
- Non-Combatants (2005) (book 2 of 2 in the Andy Holt series)
- Submariner (2008)

== Sources ==
- Alexander Fullerton, Nicholas Everard, Mariner of England: Volume 1. Little, Brown & Company, 2001. ISBN 0-316-85883-8.
