= No Orchids for Miss Blandish (novel) =

Novel by James Hadley Chase

- Cover of the first edition.
- Author: James Hadley Chase
- Language: English
- Genre: Crime novel, thriller, hardboiled
- Publisher: Jarrolds
- Publication date: 1939
- Publication place: United Kingdom
- Media type: Print (hardcover)
- ISBN: 978-0-615-33626-8
- Followed by: The Flesh of the Orchid

No Orchids for Miss Blandish is a 1939 crime novel by the British writer James Hadley Chase. It was a critical and commercial success upon release, though it also provoked considerable controversy due to its explicit depiction of sexuality and violence. In 1942, the novel was adapted into a stage play and in 1948 it became a British film. The novel became particularly popular with British servicemen during World War II.

The 1948 novel The Flesh of the Orchid by the same author is a sequel to No Orchids for Miss Blandish.

== Development and publication ==
Chase wrote No Orchids For Miss Blandish over a period of six weekends in 1938. The novel was influenced by the American crime writer James M. Cain and the stories featured in the Pulp magazine Black Mask. Although he had never visited America, Chase reportedly wrote the book as a bet to pen a story about American gangsters that would out-do The Postman Always Rings Twice in terms of obscenity and daring.

Upon publication, Chase's pulp thriller became particularly popular with British soldiers, seamen and airmen during World War II. These servicemen enjoyed its risqué passages, which marked a new frontier of daringness in popular literature. Author and military historian Patrick Bishop has called No Orchids For Miss Blandish, "perhaps the most widely-read book of the war".

== Synopsis ==
In an unnamed Midwestern town during the late 1920's, a local goon and gang leader named Riley learns that the wealthy socialite Miss Blandish will be wearing an expensive diamond necklace to her birthday celebration. Riley and his gang plan to steal the necklace and ransom it. The inept criminals manage to kidnap Miss Blandish and her boyfriend, but after the latter is accidentally killed they instead decide to hold Miss Blandish for ransom, reasoning that her millionaire father will pay more to get his daughter back safely than the necklace is worth.

The plan begins to fall apart when a rival mob, led by the sadistic and mentally unbalanced Slim Grisson, finds out about Riley's plan and kidnaps Miss Blandish from the gang. Mr. Blandish pays the ransom to Slim, but his daughter is not returned. Slim becomes increasingly obsessed with Miss Blandish and decides to keep her hidden in a secret room inside one of his nightclubs, repeatedly raping her and lashing out at anybody who attempts to wrest Miss Blandish from his charge.

Meanwhile, the police are on the trail of the kidnappers, and Dave Fenner, an ex journalist and now a private investigator, is hired to rescue her and deal with the gangsters. Fenner and the police eventually work out where the young socialite is located and go to the club, where a gun battle ensues. Slim is killed and Miss Blandish is rescued, but after months of torture and drugs at the hands of the gangsters, Miss Blandish cannot cope with freedom and kills herself.

== Reception ==
Upon publication, the book was an instant commercial success, selling over half a million copies within five years, despite wartime paper shortages. It was also controversial, due to its violence and risqué content. In 1944, it was the subject of an essay by George Orwell in Horizon, "Raffles and Miss Blandish", in which Orwell said the novel bordered on the obscene.

In 1947, the sado-eroticism in Chase's book was parodied by Raymond Queneau in his pastiche novel, We Always Treat Women Too Well.

In 1961, the novel was extensively rewritten and revised by the author because he thought the world of 1939 too distant for a new generation of readers (confusion can result if readers of the Orwell essay refer his quotations and references to the 1962 edition).

In 1973, Gene D. Phillips of Loyola University of Chicago remarked on the influence of William Faulkner's 1931 novel Sanctuary, writing that, "It is a matter of record that [No Orchids for Miss Blandish] was heavily indebted to Sanctuary for its plot line." Phillips also stated that Slim Grisson, the main antagonist, was based on Popeye, a criminal in Faulkner's novel.

In 1999, the novel was picked in a survey of the best books from the 20th century by the French retailer Fnac and the Paris newspaper Le Monde in Le Monde's 100 Books of the Century.

Since its publication, No Orchids for Miss Blandish has sold over two million copies.

== Adaptations ==
In 1942, the novel was adapted into a stage play of the same name, starring Robert Newton and Linden Travers, which ran for over 200 performances at the Prince of Wales Theatre in London.

In 1948, it was adapted into a British film of the same name and given a contemporary New York City setting. Travers (reprising her stage role) and Jack La Rue starred.

The 1971 American film The Grissom Gang was also based on the novel, moving the setting to Kansas City and the date of events back several years to 1931.

== Cultural references ==
In the novel Lanark: A Life in Four Books by the Scottish author Alasdair Gray, the hero Lanark repeatedly reads No Orchids for Miss Blandish to his love interest Rima in an attempt to cure her of a disease called dragonhide.

No Orchids for Miss Blandish is mentioned in Evelyn Waugh's novel Officers and Gentlemen and described as "unreadable".

In the novel The Queen of a Distant Country by John Braine, the book is given as an example of popular, but enjoyable culture that also has worth.

== Sequel ==
A sequel titled The Flesh of the Orchid by the same author, was published in 1948. It follows the journey of Miss Blandish's illegitimate daughter born to Slim Grisson.

== Sources ==
- Bloom, Clive. Bestsellers: popular fiction since 1900. Palgrave MacMillan, 2002.
- Chibnall, Steve & Murphy, Robert. British crime cinema. Routledge, 1999.
- Orwell, George. "Raffles and Miss Blandish". An essay comparing Raffles and No Orchids for Miss Blandish. Published in Horizon, October 1944 and Politics, November 1944.
- "No Orchids for Miss Blandish" in Yesterday's Bestsellers by Brian Stableford. Wildside Press, 1998, ISBN 978-0-8095-0906-5.
