= Mystic Story =

South Korean entertainment management company

- Native name: 미스틱스토리
- Industry: Entertainment; Music
- Genre: K-pop; R&B; Soul; Folk rock
- Founded: 2011
- Founder: Yoon Jong-shin
- Headquarters: 242-35, Nonhyeon-dong, Gangnam-gu, Seoul, South Korea
- Key people: Cho Young-chul (president, producer), Yoon Jong-shin (founder, chief producer)
- Services: Music production; Licensing; Record distribution; Artists Management
- Parent: SM Entertainment (2017–2025)
- Subsidiaries: Mystic89; APOP Entertainment; Mystic Actors
- Website: mystic89.net

Mystic Story (formerly Mystic Entertainment, Korean: 미스틱스토리, abbreviated as MSTSTR) is a South Korean entertainment company established by South Korean singer-songwriter Yoon Jong-shin. It has three subsidiaries, including Mystic Actors, which manages actors and actresses.

== History ==
In March 2014, Mystic Story was merged with Family Actors Entertainment, which managed mostly actors and actresses, to become Mystic89 & Family, with both companies maintaining their separate focus in music and acting respectively.

In July 2014, Mystic89 merged with APOP Entertainment, which houses girl group Brown Eyed Girls.

In February 2015, Mystic89 added veteran singer and actress Uhm Jung-hwa.

In March 2017, SM Entertainment acquired Mystic, becoming the label's largest shareholder.

On March 25, 2019, Mystic Entertainment changed their name to Mystic Story.

On August 14, 2025, SM Entertainment disclosed they had sold all shares in Mystic Story.

== Artists ==
=== Mystic Story ===
Soloists

- Yoon Jong-shin (윤종신) (founder/producer)
- Hareem (하림)
- Jo Jung-chi (조정치)
- Jung-in (최정인)
- Jeong Jin-woon (정진운)
- Eddy Kim (에디김)
- Son Tae-jin (손태진)
- Jo Yeon-ho (조연호)

Groups

- Shinchireem (신치림)
- Daybreak (데이브레이크)
- Lucy (루시)
- Billlie (빌리)

Entertainers

- Kim Young-chul (김영철)
- Kim Jin-soo (김진수)
- Yang Je-woong (양제웅)
- Oh Young-joo (오영주)

=== Apop ===
Soloists

- Gain (가인)
- Miryo (미료)

Groups

- Brown Eyed Girls (브라운아이드걸스)

Studio artists

- Cho Young-chul (조영철) (producer and CEO)
- Lee Minsu (이민수) (composer)
- Kim Eana (김이나) (lyricist)

=== Mystic Actors ===
- Cha Min-jee (차민지)
- Go Min-si (고민시)
- Ha Jae-sook (하재숙)
- Jang Won-hyung (장원형)
- Jo Han-sun (조한선)
- Jung Tae-woo (정태우)
- Jung Yu-mi (2021–present) (정유미)
- Kim Jae-won (2021–present) (김재원)
- Kim Kang-min (김강민)
- Kim Seo-hyung (2025–present) (김서형)
- Kim Suk-hoon (김석훈)
- Kim Sung-eun (김성은)
- Lee Chang-hoon (이창훈)
- Lee Ji-won (이지원)
- Lee Jung-hyuk (이정혁)
- Lee Woo-tae (이우태)
- Noh Susanna (노수산나)
- Oh Dong-min (오동민)
- Oh Ji-eun (오지은; 2013–present)
- Park Hyuk-kwon (박혁권)
- Park Sun-woo (박선우)
- Ryohei Otani (료헤이오타니; 2015–present)
- Seo Ji-soo (2022–present) (서지수)
- Shin Jae-hwi (신재휘)
- Tae Hang-ho (태항호; 2016–present)

== Former groups ==
- ARrC

== Former artists ==
- Ahn Mi-na
- Brown Eyed Girls
  - Narsha (2015–2018)
  - JeA (2015–2021)
- Cha Min-ji
- Halim
- Han Chae-ah
- Hong-ja
- Hwang Bo-reum-byeol (2020–2024)
- Jang Jae-in
- Jang So-yeon
- Jo Kyu-chan
- Jo Won-seon
- Kim Yeon-woo
- Kian84
- Kim Si-a (2019–2024)
- Lee Chan-hyeong (2019–2023)
- Lee Ji-yeon
- Lee Joo-yeon
- Lim Kim (2011–2016)
- Muzie (2017)
- Oh Young-joo (2019-2026)
- Park Jae-jung
- Park Ji-yoon
- Park Sang-don
- Park Si-yeon
- Seo Jang Hoon
- Shin So-yeon
- Son Eun-seo
- Miyu Takeuchi (2019–2021)
- Yoon Hye-jin

== Distribution partners ==
- CJ E&M Music and Live
- Kakao M
