= IRrelevant Astronomy =

Web series about the Spitzer Space Telescope

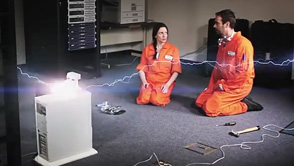
An evil artificial intelligence unit attempts to take control of NASA, from the episode Fusion vs. Fission

IRrelevant Astronomy is a web series produced by NASA's Spitzer Space Telescope. Each episode explains a general science concept or reveals science news relevant to Spitzer. The "IR" in the title stands for "infrared", making the title refer to "infrared-relevant astronomy." The first episode launched on January 15, 2008, on the Spitzer Space Telescope website.

== Cast and guest stars ==
- Sean Astin appears in the episode "Part Two" as a scientist struggling to save the Spitzer Space Telescope. He also provides the voice of a badly-edited audiobook in the episode "Behind the Scenes: When Galaxies Collide", and appears as a fictional version of himself in "Behind the Scenes: Dead Stars".
- Veronica Belmont appears in "Astronomy Anemone" and is consumed by her love of space science.
- Felicia Day appears as a fictional version of herself in the comedic "Behind the Scenes: When Galaxies Collide".
- Cameron Diaz appears in the episode "RATS In Progress: The Mass of Asteroids".

Recurring incompetent filmmakers The Director and Flunky #2, from the episode "Spitzer Space Telescope: The Musical"

- Mark Hamill provides a cameo as a fictional version of himself in the episode "Robot Astronomy Talk Show: Gravity & the Great Attractor".
- Linda Hamilton spoofs her robot-fighting character from the Terminator films in "Robot Astronomy Talk Show: Back In Time".
- Casey McKinnon stars in the episode "Fusion vs. Fission".
- Ellen McLain provides the voice of NOTGLaDOS in the episode "Fusion vs. Fission".
- Amy Okuda appears as a fictional version of herself in the episode "Spaceship Spitzer: Bots of Both Worlds".
- Sandeep Parikh plays a fictional version of himself in the episode "Behind the Scenes: Dead Stars".
- Dean Stockwell lends a sympathetic ear to the evil robots in "Robot Astronomy Talk Show: Back In Time".
- George Takei appears as a fictional version of himself in the episode "Robot Astronomy Talk Show: Gravity & the Great Attractor".

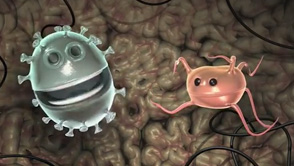
A parasitic microbe produces an educational show by tapping into an astronomer's brain, from the episode "Ask an Astronomy Brain Parasite"

- Alan Tudyk voices the titular microbe in the episode "Ask an Astronomy Brain Parasite".
- Ed Wasser is credited as the voice role of robot IR-2 in the Robot Astronomy Talk Show series beginning with episode 8. He also appears as robot IR-2 in the episode "Spaceship Spitzer: Bots of Both Worlds".
- Wil Wheaton appears in a dual role in the episode "Spaceship Spitzer: Bots of Both Worlds": as both himself and the voice of robot co-pilot Irwin. Wil next appears as "The Physician" in the Doctor Who spoof "Robot Astronomy Talk Show: Destroyer of Worlds", and cameos in the episode "Ask an Astronomy Brain Parasite".
- Betty White voices a fictional version of herself in the episode "Part Two".

== Production crew ==
Tim Pyle - director/co-creator/writer/animator/music composer/producer (2008–present) - Tim worked for 10 years as an animator in the visual effects industry, including on the cult-favorite Invader Zim. Other projects include the Academy Award-nominated Jimmy Neutron, Emmy-nominated series Starship Troopers: the Series, and the Emmy-winning Children of Dune. He has personally won two Aegis Awards, a Telly Award, a CINE Golden Eagle, and 2006 & 2008 NASA awards for producing CG animation. He was the writer and director of Decaying Orbit, a sci-fi DVD feature.

Kenneth Kolb - producer (2009–present) - Kenneth worked 10 years with the Walt Disney Company including Buena Vista Pictures Distribution, and as a coordinator for the Disney Channel. He has worked as the CFO of the Kendrea International Corporation for the past five years, produced several indie short films, and also currently works as a producer for Hogofilm, where he assisted with the production of the feature film Decaying Orbit. He began co-producing IRrelevant Astronomy starting with the episodes released in April 2009.

Dr. Carolyn Brinkworth - science writer (2013–present) - Carolyn is a professional astronomer and educator. She graduated from the University of Southampton (U.K.) with her PhD in astrophysics in 2005, and moved to Caltech, where she now works as the Education and Outreach Scientist for a number of NASA missions. She has been involved in education and public outreach for 15 years, since working at the U.K.‘s National Space Center in Leicester as an undergraduate, and is now studying for her MA in education from Claremont Graduate University. In her spare time, Carolyn volunteers with The Trevor Project.

Jim Keller - co-creator/writer/producer (2008-2009, 2013) - Jim is a member of the Screen Actors Guild, AFTRA, and the Actors' Equity Association, having appeared in shows like Days of our Lives and Melrose Place. His work on NASA's Ask an Astronomer video podcast series has won a Silver Telly Award, a Bronze Telly Award, an Aegis Award, and two Aegis Finalists. Additional awards include an Aegis Award and a CINE Golden Eagle.

Austin Wintory - music composer (2008-2009) - Austin is a music composer for film, TV, and video games. He composed the score for Captain Abu Raed, a multiple award-winning film including the World Cinema Audience Award at the Sundance Film Festival in 2008. The film has been submitted by the Kingdom of Jordan for a 2009 Foreign Language Oscar. Austin also composed the score to Sony's Flow video game and expansion packs for the Sony PlayStation 3 & PSP, which earned strong reviews for the quality of music.

== Shows ==
Evil talk-show-host robot IR-2 attempts to conquer the Universe in the Robot Astronomy Talk Show episodes, here encountering his evil talk-show-host twin

Ask an Astronomer: (25 episodes) Videos explaining basic and complex astronomy concepts in a simple way. Some episodes feature Dr. Michelle Thaller.

Ask an Astronomy Brain Parasite: (1 episode) Deep inside an astronomer's head, a parasite taps into his brain to learn about science.

Astronomy Anemone: (1 episode) A giant, surly man-eating sea anemone hosts an astronomy-themed talk show.

The Musical: (2 episodes) Mini-musicals, using song to teach astronomy concepts.

Behind the Scenes: (2 episodes) A mock behind-the-scenes look at the production of an educational video.

Part Two: (1 episode) A spoof of old action TV shows. The bulk of the episode shows scenes from a fictitious first episode that never existed, followed by a quick conclusion that appears to wrap everything up neatly.

Psych Out: (1 episode) A short about an astronomer visiting a therapist and taking a Rorschach-type inkblot test using images from the Spitzer Space Telescope.

Robot Astronomy Talk Show: (11 episodes) A series about robots who want to rule the Universe, while producing a talk show featuring interviews with celebrities and astronomers.

Dub'ya: (1 episode) An old movie is edited down and re-dubbed with dialogue about current Spitzer Space Telescope science.

Spaceship Spitzer: (3 episodes) Spitzer astronomer Dr. Michelle Thaller travels with a robot pilot in a spaceship based on the design of NASA's Spitzer Space Telescope. Integrating live action and CG animation, there are currently two episodes: "Enemy Mine" and "The Slowlian Web."

M51 & Gizmo: (1 episode) Innocent alien M51 accidentally unleashes havoc on the planet Earth, and learns about how life exists in the Universe.

Skinfrared: (2 episodes) A series of direct educational narratives about infrared as it relates to the human body. Originally screened as part of the 2007 "Skin Festival" in Pasadena, CA.

Fusion vs. Fission: (1 episode) Spoofing GLaDOS from the videogame series Portal, a description of nuclear fusion in the Sun.

== Episodes ==
No.	Title	Directed by	Written by	Original release date
1	"Skinfrared #1"	Tim Pyle	Robert Hurt & Tim Pyle	January 15, 2008
What is infrared light? The Skinfrared series contrasts the world around us in both visible and infrared light, giving the viewer a perspective on how infrared observatories like the Spitzer Space Telescope view the Universe.
2	"Spaceship Spitzer: Enemy Mine"	Tim Pyle	Tim Pyle & Michelle Thaller	January 17, 2008
While in battle around the super-massive black hole at the center of the galaxy, Dr. Michelle Thaller teaches Irwin (IR-1) the science behind these giant singularities.
3	"Skinfrared #2: Water and Ice"	Tim Pyle	Robert Hurt & Tim Pyle	February 8, 2008
Viewing liquids in extreme temperatures in both visible and infrared light, this episode of the Skinfrared series gives viewers a perspective on how infrared observatories like the Spitzer Space Telescope view the Universe.
4	"RATS: Asteroids"	Tim Pyle	Jim Keller & Tim Pyle	March 4, 2008
Will an asteroid strike the Earth and wipe out all life as we know it? IR-2 and his robotic crew make random phone calls to find out.
5	"RATS: Water in the Universe"	Tim Pyle	Jim Keller & Tim Pyle	March 13, 2008
Astronomers have discovered huge amounts of water around baby stars; IR-2 and his crew plan to make use of it.
6	"Dub'ya: Mountie Martin and the Space Diamonds"	Tim Pyle	Tim Pyle	April 21, 2008
Are tiny diamonds really common in the Universe? Join the intrepid Mountie Martin as he endeavors to find out, while on the trail of the sinister Sammy the Smuggler!
7	"RATS: Baby Stars"	Tim Pyle	Jim Keller & Tim Pyle	May 16, 2008
Where do stars come from? IR-2 analyzes recent Spitzer imagery to find out, while an imposing Ratings-bot oversees the broadcast.
8	"RATS: Omega Centauri"	Tim Pyle	Jim Keller & Tim Pyle	July 2, 2008
While the robots are away, a sad and lonely man calls in with a beautiful image of the Omega Centauri globular cluster.
9	"RATS: The Building Blocks of Life"	Tim Pyle	Jim Keller & Tim Pyle	July 21, 2008
IR-2 and his crew learn about PAHs, which may be the building of all life in the Universe, and decide to put them to good use.
10	"Psych Out"	Tim Pyle	Jim Keller & Tim Pyle	August 25, 2008
Does the Helix Nebula look like a human eye? Why do we think we see well-known objects in nebulous images from space? An astronomer and his therapist clash over the issue in this comedic but educational animated short.
11	"RATS: Sculpting with Stars"	Tim Pyle	Jim Keller & Tim Pyle	October 22, 2008
IR-2 opens diplomatic relations with the Earth, as a first step toward ruling over all humans on the planet.
12	"Spaceship Spitzer: The Slowlian Web"	Tim Pyle	Tim Pyle & Michelle Thaller	November 25, 2008
During a tense face-off with a sinister (but extremely slow-moving) alien race, Dr. Michelle Thaller shows Irwin (IR-1) how scientists can determine what exrasolar planets are made of, even when the planets are too far away to see.
13	"M51 & Gizmo: Half-Baked Plan"	Tim Pyle	Jim Keller & Tim Pyle	January 23, 2009
Hoping for his birthday to come around sooner, innocent alien M51 moves the Earth into a closer, faster orbit around the Sun, and learns an important lesson life in the Universe.
14	"RATS: Twin Brown Dwarfs"	Tim Pyle	Jim Keller & Tim Pyle	March 11, 2009
While the trapped in an interdimensional portal between two brown dwarfs, IR-2 and the robot encounter their evil twins from an alternate universe.
15	"RATS: Gravity and the Great Attractor"	Tim Pyle	Jim Keller & Tim Pyle	April 23, 2009
George Takei, Mark Hamill, and Ed Wasser, provide voices as IR-2 and the robot crew take a look at the Great Attractor, a massive hidden object that is pulling in every nearby galaxy in the local Universe (including our own).
16	"Part Two: The Warm Mission"	Tim Pyle	Tim Pyle	June 22, 2009
In this spoof of old TV action shows, Sean Astin, Osa Wallander, and Betty White search for a way to help the Spitzer Space Telescope after it runs out of coolant.
17	"RATS: Back in Time"	Tim Pyle	Jim Keller & Tim Pyle	August 24, 2009
Linda Hamilton attempts to foil the robots' plans of Universal conquest; meanwhile, Dean Stockwell explains the concept of "looking back in time" at objects in space, and how it helps astronomers understand how the Universe has evolved. Starring Ed Wasser as the voice of IR-2.
18	"Behind the Scenes: When Galaxies Collide"	Tim Pyle	Tim Pyle	October 26, 2009
Felicia Day explains some of the science behind galactic "collisions", including the upcoming collision between the galaxy Andromeda and the Milky Way, in this mock behind-the-scenes look at the making of an educational video. Sean Astin also stars.
19	"Spitzer Space Telescope: The Musical"	Tim Pyle	Jim Keller, Tim Pyle, Danny Tieger	March 9, 2010
A singing NASA supervisor uses song to explain about NASA's Spitzer Space Telescope, and how infrared astronomy differs from visible-light telescopes like Hubble. Featuring an original song performed by Danny Tieger.
20	"Spaceship Spitzer: Bots of Both Worlds"	Tim Pyle	Tim Pyle	May 25, 2010
Amy Okuda flies to Saturn to observe a new giant ring around the planet: the largest ring ever discovered in the Solar System, but one that was only recently revealed through infrared observations by NASA's Spitzer Space Telescope in 2009. While there, she and Irwin (voiced by Wil Wheaton) encounter an old enemy, and must defeat their sinister plot. Ed Wasser also stars.
21	"Behind the Scenes: Dead Stars"	Tim Pyle	Jim Keller & Tim Pyle	August 10, 2010
Actor Sean Astin is hired by a bullying educational film Director and her Flunky #2 sidekick to explain about the life and death of stars. But when things go wrong on the set, actor Sandeep Parikh is hired to replace Sean...only to have things take a bizarre twist.
22	"RATS: Destroyer of Worlds"	Tim Pyle	Jim Keller & Tim Pyle	November 27, 2010
Robot IR-2 (Ed Wasser) meets The Physician (Wil Wheaton), an intergalactic buttinsky in a small blue box spaceship. Together, they work to escape "The Destroyer of Worlds", a binary star system that is destroying its inner planets. With: Brigitte Dale
23	"Astronomy Anemone"	Tim Pyle	Kenneth Kolb & Tim Pyle	February 15, 2011
Veronica Belmont co-hosts a space-themed talk show with Astronomy Anemone, a carnivorous man-eating sea polyp. WARNING: Contains scenes of cartoon violence and scientific jargon.
24	"Big Bang: The Musical"	Tim Pyle	Tim Pyle, Danny Tieger	March 18, 2011
Did you know radiation from the Big Bang can be seen on any analogue TV set? In this mini-musical, a young couple (Brigitte Dale, Marc Helou) discusses the real science behind this, while arguing over what to watch on TV. Original song written & performed by Danny Tieger.
25	"RATS In Progress: The Mass of Asteroids"	Tim Pyle	Jim Keller & Tim Pyle	February 26, 2013
Cameron Diaz teaches Robot IR-2 how astronomers can measure the mass of asteroids from tremendous distances.
26	"Ask an Astronomy Brain Parasite"	Tim Pyle	Tim Pyle	July 16, 2013
Deep inside an astronomer's head, a parasite (voiced by Alan Tudyk) taps into his brain to learn about...science! Specifically, about why astronauts appear weightless in space. Featuring Wil Wheaton.
27	"Fusion vs. Fission"	Tim Pyle	Tim Pyle	February 12, 2014
When a science-mad A.I. system is installed at NASA, two hapless computer technicians (Casey McKinnon, Mike Romo) learn the process behind nuclear fusion in the Sun, and how it differs from fission. Starring Ellen McLain as the voice of NOTGLaDOS.

== Awards ==
On October 19, 2008, IRrelevant Astronomy was nominated for "Best Technology/Science Podcast" at the 2008 Podcast Awards. It was one of 10 finalists in this category following a nomination process that included 281,000 votes. In October 2009, the IRrelevant Astronomy episode "Psych Out" was an official selection at the 2nd annual Imagine Science Film Festival. The IRrelevant Astronomy episode "M51 & Gizmo" has previously won multiple awards including an Aegis Award, CINE Golden Eagle, and winning a "Best of Festival" award at the Kids First Film Festival.

== See also ==
- Episodes of Martha Speaks, a television series that mainly focuses on vocabulary, but occasionally also on astronomy
