= The World in My Pocket =

The World in My Pocket may refer to:

- The World in My Pocket (novel), a 1959 thriller novel by James Hadley Chase
- World in My Pocket, a 1961 European crime-drama film based on the novel
