= Just a Matter of Time (novel) =

Cover of the first edition, published by Robert Hale

Just a Matter of Time is a 1972 thriller novella by British writer James Hadley Chase.

== Plot summary ==
Alice Morely-Johnson is an old lady worth several million dollars. She had been a popular pianist, and now has retired to live in a penthouse with a chauffeur named Bromhead, who serves her impeccably. Her financial matters are handled by a banker named Chris Patterson, who does because he knows that Miss Morely-Johnson is fond of him and gives him costly gifts. When Miss Morely-Johnson’s companion-help goes away, she asks Patterson to search for one. Patterson falls for an applicant named Sheila, and Miss Morely-Johnson seems to like her because allegedly Sheila had played on stage with her father.

Patterson is excited about Sheila getting the job because he can meet her. What Patterson does not know is that Sheila has been fixed beforehand by Bromhead, who plans to execute the perfect crime of killing Miss Morely-Johnson and making it appear like an accident. That way, her insurance money goes to a nephew of hers, Harry, who is in love with Sheila as well. The plan was that, after Morely-Johnson's death, they would divide the money in three equal parts and move on. The plan begins to go awry, though, when the detective on duty in the penthouse senses something fishy about Sheila dressing up as someone else when leaving the flat.

== Film adaptation ==
The same year it was adapted into the film Not Dumb, The Bird directed by Jean Delannoy and starring Françoise Rosay, Anny Duperey and Bruno Pradal.
