= A Lotus for Miss Quon =

1961 novel by James Hadley Chase

- First edition
- Author: James Hadley Chase
- Language: English
- Genre: Thriller
- Publisher: Robert Hale
- Publication date: 1961
- Publication place: United Kingdom
- Media type: Print

A Lotus for Miss Quon is a 1961 thriller novel by the British writer James Hadley Chase.

== Film adaptation ==
In 1967 it was made into the West German film Lotus Flowers for Miss Quon directed by Jürgen Roland and starring Lang Jeffries, Francesca Tu and Werner Peters. This was part of a boom in adaptations of British crime writers including Chase and Edgar Wallace.

== Bibliography ==
- Goble, Alan. The Complete Index to Literary Sources in Film. Walter de Gruyter, 1999.
- Kelleghan, Fiona. 100 Masters of Mystery and Detective Fiction: Baynard H. Kendrick - Israel Zangwill, Volume 2. Salem Press, 2001.
