= The Set-Up (1995 film) =

- Directed by: Strathford Hamilton
- Written by: Michael Thoma
- Based on: My Laugh Comes Last; 1977 novel by James Hadley Chase
- Produced by: Julia Verdin
- Starring: Billy Zane; Mia Sara; James Russo; James Coburn; Louis Mandylor; Tommy 'Tiny' Lister; Mark Rolston; Margaret Avery; Lisa Collins; Vince Deadrick Jr. Shannon Wilcox; Paula O'Hara; Ed Wasser; Brent Morris; Tom Muzila; Stephen Lofaro; Roy Jenson; Kevin McLaughlin; Scott L. Schwartz
- Cinematography: David Lewis
- Edited by: Marcy Hamilton
- Music by: Conrad Pope
- Distributed by: Metro-Goldwyn-Mayer
- Release date: 1995
- Running time: 93 minutes
- Country: United States
- Language: English

The Set-Up is a 1995 American crime thriller film directed by Strathford Hamilton and starring Billy Zane. It was based on the 1977 novel My Laugh Comes Last by James Hadley Chase.

== Plot ==
Charlie Thorpe, a security systems expert, is caught during a robbery. When he get released from prison, a bank owner hires him to design a fool-proof system during the refurbishing of his bank. After he has completed the system, he begins getting blackmailed, to break his system.

== Cast ==
- Billy Zane as Charles Thorpe
- Mia Sara as Gina Sands
- James Russo as Kliff
- James Coburn as Jeremiah Cole
- Louis Mandylor as Pauly
- Tommy 'Tiny' Lister as Leon (credited as Tiny 'Zeus' Lister)
- Mark Rolston as Ray Harris
- Margaret Avery as Olivia Dubois
- Lisa Collins as Elizabeth
- Vince Deadrick Jr. as Officer Jones
- Shannon Wilcox as Mrs. Cole
- Paula O'Hara as Julia (credited as Paula Coburn)
- Ed Wasser as Cop #1
- Brent Morris as Cop #2
- Tom Muzila as Boxer
- Stephen Lofaro as Manager
- Roy Jenson as Older Guard
- Kevin McLaughlin as Young Guard
- Scott L. Schwartz as Maniac (uncredited)

== Release ==
It debuted on the American premium television network Showtime on July 23, 1995.

== Reception ==
Time Out reviewed the film, writing that it was "a movie that's more plot than characterisation, and is already doomed from the moment they cast the synthetic male lead." Variety and TV Guide also reviewed The Set-Up, the latter of which felt that "Persuasively acted by veteran smoothie James Coburn and the two romantic leads, THE SET-UP is knocked down a few pegs by the robbers--Mandylor, who seethes with "method" menace; former wrestler Tiny Lister, a Tor Johnson for the '90s, and the hammy Russo, who seems on a pilgrimage to showcase the worst aspects of Method-acted hooliganism in all his performances. " Of Coburn, a reviewer for The Age noted that "the veteran film heavy deserves better."
