= Get a Load of This =

Get a Load of This may refer to:

- Get a Load of This (short story collection), a 1942 book by James Hadley Chase
- Get a Load of This (album), a 2005 album by Slunt
- Get a Load of This, a 1941 stage musical by Manning Sherwin
- "Get a Load of This", a 1925 song composed by Harry Archer
- "Get a Load of This", a 1974 song by R. Crumb & His Cheap Suit Serenaders
