= The Guilty Are Afraid =

1957 novel by James Hadley Chase

- Cover of the first edition, published by Robert Hale
- Author: James Hadley Chase
- Language: English
- Publisher: Robert Hale
- Publication date: 1957
- OCLC: 3449988
- LC Class: PZ3.R2167 Gu

The Guilty Are Afraid is a 1957 thriller novel by British writer James Hadley Chase. The novel is set against the background of a rich gangster ridden city on the American Pacific Coast where Lew Brandon, the protagonist, looks for the killer, the antagonist who disposed of his partner Jack Sheppey.
