= Guy Hamilton =

English film director (1922–2016)

- Hamilton in 1967
- Born: Mervyn Ian Guy Hamilton; 16 September 1922; Paris, France
- Died: 20 April 2016 (aged 93); Mallorca, Spain
- Occupation: Film director
- Years active: 1938–1989
- Spouses: Naomi Chance (m. 1953, divorced); Kerima (m. 1964; died 2014)

Mervyn Ian Guy Hamilton DSC (16 September 1922 – 20 April 2016) was an English film director. He directed 22 films from the 1950s to the 1980s, including four James Bond films.

== Early life ==
Hamilton was born in Paris on 16 September 1922, son of Frederick William Guy Hamilton (1895–1988), press attaché to the British embassy in Paris and Captain in the King's Own Royal Lancaster Regiment, and Winifred Grace Culling (1895–1970), daughter of William Archibald Culling Fremantle, of the Church Missionary Society in India. His mother was a great-granddaughter of the Christian campaigner Sir Culling Eardley, 3rd Baronet, and of the politician Thomas Fremantle, 1st Baron Cottesloe. His parents divorced in 1923, and Hamilton was educated in England at Haileybury College. He later said, "The cinema, more specifically the storytelling part of the cinema, really fascinated me. From the age of ten, till I was about fourteen or fifteen, a holiday was a lousy one if I didn’t see one picture a day." He said a crucial event was seeing La bête humaine (1938) which "absolutely knocked me out. It was as if I grew up immediately... I just knew that’s where I wanted to make my career."

Hamilton's first exposure to the film industry came in 1938, when he was a clapperboard boy at the Victorine Studios in Nice. At the outbreak of the Second World War in 1939, Hamilton escaped from France by the MV Saltersgate, a collier bound for French North Africa; one of the other 500 refugees aboard was W. Somerset Maugham.

Having travelled from Oran to Gibraltar before arriving in London, he worked in the film library at Paramount News before being commissioned in the Royal Navy; he served in the 15th Motor Torpedo Boat 718 Flotilla, a unit that ferried agents into France and brought downed British pilots back to England.

During this service, he was left behind for a month in occupied Brittany; he was later awarded the Distinguished Service Cross.

== Career ==
=== Assistant director ===
After the war Hamilton wanted to get into film production. He said " In my absence, the unions had become very powerful, and I couldn’t get a ‘ticket’—you couldn't get a job in the film business if you didn't have a ticket. So I had to do quite a lot of stalling around but finally—finally—I got in as a third assistant director." He managed to get a job on a second unit in Dartmoor on a Trevor Heid picture. Then he was put under contract by Alexander Korda as a third assistant director. Over the next few years he worked his way up to a first assistant director.

Hamilton later said, "I found that working with bad directors was infinitely more useful because you watched them get into trouble three times a day and puddle around and you say, you know, I won't do that, I don't want to fall into that trap."

He worked on They Made Me a Fugitive (1947), Mine Own Executioner (1947), Anna Karenina (1948), and The Fallen Idol (1949) directed by Carol Reed. "I was devoted to Carol," said Hamilton later. "He made my life easy because I followed him around like a little dog while learning my trade. If you’d ask him a question, he’d always answer it...Carol Reed was the biggest influence on me and on everything that I did."

Hamilton assisted on Britannia Mews (1949), a 20th Century Fox film shot in England, directed by Jean Negulesco; was reunited with Reed on The Third Man (1949), in which Hamilton doubled for Orson Welles in a couple of shots; The Angel with the Trumpet (1950), State Secret (1950) for Sidney Gilliat; Outcast of the Islands (1951) for Reed; The African Queen (1951) for John Huston; and Home at Seven (1952) for Ralph Richardson.

=== Early films as director ===
Reed suggested to Hamilton that if he wanted to direct he should refuse to re-sign with Korda unless he gave Hamilton a chance to direct. It worked and Korda allocated Hamilton the job of directing the B-movie The Ringer (1952). Hamilton later said it was Carol Reed who advised him to make a comedy thriller as "You’ll miss some of the thrills, some of the laughs, but with a bit of luck there'll be something left", suggesting The Ringer as it only needed one set and could be shot in two weeks.

Hamilton's second film as director was The Intruder (1953) dealing with soldiers returning to civilian life, produced by Ivan Foxwell who would make three more films with Hamilton. The movie was an "A picture and Hamilton was able to make it after being approved by Jack Hawkins. The director wanted to follow it with a film of Dial M for Murder but Korda sold the rights to the play to Alfred Hitchcock and instead assigned Hamilton to direct an adaptation of An Inspector Calls (1954).

Hamilton's fourth film as director was the prisoner-of-war story The Colditz Story (1955), which he also co-wrote with producer Foxwell. It was his highest-grossing movie of the decade. He also tried a musical with Max Bygraves, Charley Moon (1956) and an adventure film which he co-wrote with Foxwell, Manuela (1957) which he later said was one of his most personal movies.

Hamilton had his first experience with larger-budget films towards the end of the decade, when he replaced the sacked Alexander Mackendrick on the set of The Devil's Disciple (1959) featuring Kirk Douglas and Burt Lancaster. Hamilon later said "The terrifying thing was that I found it so easy to be a ‘traffic cop’ with no ‘gut’ in the project. I'd never done it before and won't do it again. All you can do is follow the blueprint."

Hamilton made A Touch of Larceny (1960), which he co-wrote with producer Foxwell, and said "I have a soft spot for that picture because I enjoyed working with James Mason very much; it was a very enjoyable picture for me."

Hamilton again found himself working with a war theme on the Dino De Laurentiis-produced Italian war comedy The Best of Enemies (1961). This was the first film to show Hamilton's skill with intricate set-piece action sequences.

He refused an offer to direct Dr. No (1962), the first James Bond film. His next release, and somewhat outside his developing œuvre, was The Party's Over, which, though filmed in 1963, was not released until 1965. The film was heavily censored and, in protest, Hamilton asked for his name to be removed when the film was finally released. He directed Man in the Middle (1964) with Robert Mitchum.

=== James Bond ===
Hamilton followed with his first James Bond film, Goldfinger (1964). He later reflected that he was able to successfully merge the series's mix of action adventure, sexual innuendo and black humour. He later said "after one Bond, you should walk away from it, charge your batteries, and then come back if you have something to say. I felt I didn’t have that, and to do Bond justice, you have to arrive with a huge amount of enthusiasm."

In the late 1960s, Hamilton directed two further films for Bond producer Harry Saltzman: Funeral in Berlin (1966, starring Michael Caine), and the war epic Battle of Britain (1969).

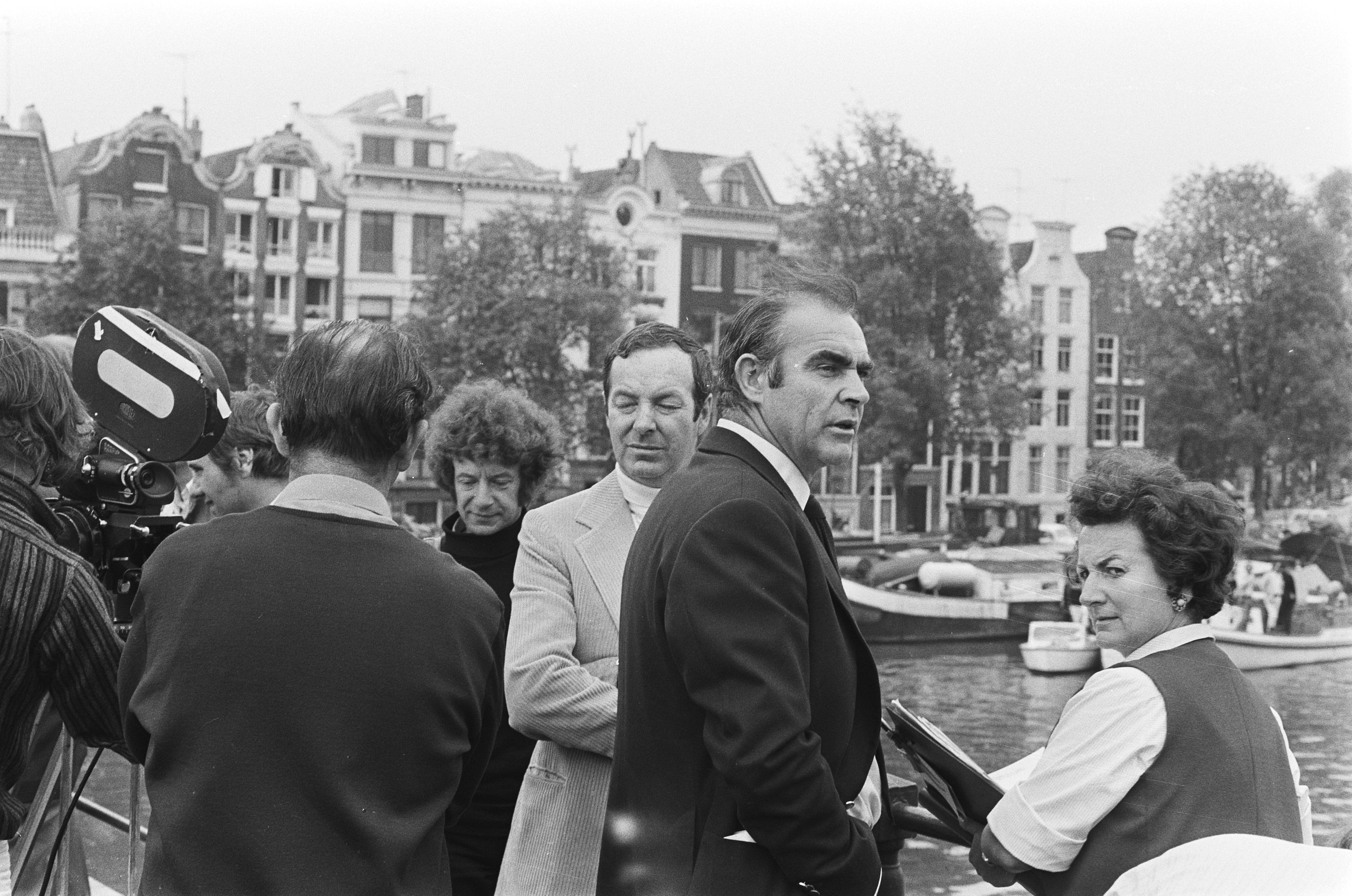
Hamilton (centre, in light suit), with Sean Connery at the filming of Diamonds Are Forever in Amsterdam, 1971

He returned to the Bond film franchise with the chase- and gadget-dependent Diamonds Are Forever (1971), Live and Let Die (1973) and The Man with the Golden Gun (1974). He claimed in a much later interview that he had instructed Roger Moore not to mimic Sean Connery's rendition of James Bond and said the only Bond he regretted making was Golden Gun. Hamilton was later asked to direct For Your Eyes Only (1981) but declined because the cash-strapped United Artists could not afford his salary.

Hamilton was originally chosen to direct Superman: The Movie (1978), but due to his status as a tax exile, he was allowed to be in England for only thirty days a year, where production had moved at the last minute to Pinewood Studios. The job of director was then passed to Richard Donner, but Hamilton insisted that he be paid in full.

Hamilton's only films in the latter part of the 1970s were the commercially unsuccessful Force 10 from Navarone (1978) and the poorly received adaptation of Agatha Christie's mystery The Mirror Crack'd (1980).

Another Christie adaptation followed in 1982, with Evil Under the Sun which was received more favourably than The Mirror Crack'd.

Hamilton directed only two more films in the 1980s (Remo Williams: The Adventure Begins in 1985 and 1989's Try This One for Size) before retiring.

In the late 1980s he was approached to direct Batman (1989), but declined. In a 2003 interview, he said that the contemporary Bond films relied too heavily on special effects and not as much on the spectacular and risky stunts of the Bond films of his era. "I know that I’ve made some bad pictures, but when I was making a film, I knew I had to do the best I could with the material that I was working with," he said. "Sometimes I wished I had a more cooperative or a better writer, but that's the same for everybody."

== Personal life and later life ==
Hamilton was married twice, first to Naomi Chance in 1953, and then to the actress Kerima in 1964, many years after they first met during the filming of Outcast of the Islands. They lived in a villa in Andratx on the Mediterranean island of Mallorca from the mid-1970s until his death.

Hamilton died in Mallorca on 20 April 2016, at the age of 93.

== Filmography ==
Year	Title	Distributor	Notes
1952	The Ringer	British Lion Films	
1953	The Intruder	British Lion Films	
1954	An Inspector Calls	British Lion Films	
1955	The Colditz Story	British Lion Films	Also co-writer
1956	Charley Moon	British Lion Films	
1957	Manuela	Paramount Pictures	
1959	The Devil's Disciple	United Artists	
1959	A Touch of Larceny	Paramount Pictures	
1961	The Best of Enemies	Dino De Laurentiis Cinematografica	
1964	Man in the Middle	20th Century Fox	
1964	Goldfinger	United Artists	
1965	The Party's Over	Monarch Film Corporation	
1966	Funeral in Berlin	Paramount Pictures	
1969	Battle of Britain	United Artists	
1971	Diamonds Are Forever	United Artists	
1973	Live and Let Die	United Artists	
1974	The Man with the Golden Gun	United Artists	
1978	Force 10 from Navarone	Columbia Pictures	
1980	The Mirror Crack'd	Columbia-EMI-Warner Distributors	
1982	Evil Under the Sun	Columbia-EMI-Warner Distributors	
1985	Remo Williams: The Adventure Begins	Orion Pictures	
1989	Try This One for Size		

== Notes ==
- McFarlane, Brian (1997). An autobiography of British cinema : as told by the filmmakers and actors who made it. Methuen.
