= The Whiff of Money =

1969 novel by James Hadley Chase

- Cover of the first edition, published by Robert Hale.
- Author: James Hadley Chase
- Language: English
- Publisher: Robert Hale
- Publication date: 1969
- ISBN: 0-7091-0631-9 (first edition)
- Dewey Decimal: 823.912
- LC Class: PZ3.R2167 Wh

The Whiff of Money is a 1969 thriller novel by British writer James Hadley Chase. The book features his character Mark Girland.

== Plot summary ==
This book follows Mark Girland's next adventure after Have This One on Me. John Dorey asks Mark Girland to fetch a blue movie tape from Paris without telling him who the girl in the tape is. Girland, while working out his plan finds out, to his utter surprise, that the girl featured in the tape is the daughter of Sherman, a man who is running for the presidential election in the United States. His daughter, Gilly threatens to expose the tapes to ruin her father's chances of becoming the president of the United States. Her act is an instance of retaliation because her father and mother had never taken care of her in her childhood and she had had to do without the parental love and affection.

The book follows Girland as he finds his way through the underground pornographic industry of Paris to rescue the girl and the tape for $20,000. He finds the girl but there is a business mogul who has invested a lot of money on Sherman's presidential campaign for not wholly honest reasons. He plans to kill the girl and Girland in his mansion.

Girland again meets Malik, who is a secret agent of the Soviets and who is also after the tape. The book follows Girland as he tries to rescue Gilly and the tape which could prove dangerous to a lot of people.

The story contain references to the books "Have this one on me”, ”Believed violent” and ”This is for real” (also by James Hadley Chase).
