= You Can Say That Again =

1980 novel by James Hadley Chase

- First edition
- Author: James Hadley Chase
- Language: English
- Genre: Thriller
- Publisher: Robert Hale
- Publication date: 1980
- Publication place: United Kingdom

You Can Say That Again is a thriller novel by British author James Hadley Chase. It is a crime thriller revolving around the life of a small-time actor in Los Angeles.

== Plot summary ==
Jerry Stevens is a small-time actor who has done many part-time roles in Hollywood and is now unemployed, looking for a simple job, far less a big break. He is one day called by his job agent who tells him that he is wanted for a very special assignment in California for which he will be paid well. Jerry walks into it, which actually leads him into a world of treachery, lies and deception involving criminals. The rest of the story is about whether or not Jerry is able to deal with everyone and survive the muddle.
