= I Would Rather Stay Poor =

1962 novel by James Hadley Chase

- Cover art by Val Biro.
- Author: James Hadley Chase
- Language: English
- Publication date: 1962

I Would Rather Stay Poor is a 1962 thriller novel by British writer James Hadley Chase.

== Plot summary ==
Dave Calvin, handsome and well built, with a charm that women would fall for, but divorced, dishonest and greedy, is appointed as manager of the bank in Pittsville when the existing manager falls ill. At the advice of his simple secretary Alice Craig, he soon finds lodging with widowed Kit Loring staying with her young daughter who is in love with Ken Travers, the local police deputy sheriff, waiting for a breakthrough to marry his lover.

Soon Calvin decides to steal a huge payroll of $300,000 from the bank and get away with it, and ropes in Kit for the same. But things do not go their way, and soon they find themselves in a puddle of troubles full of treachery, deception and even murder. And to make matters worse for Calvin, he soon realizes that Kit is an alcoholic who can spill the beans anytime.
