= James Hadley Chase =

English author (1906–1985)

- Born: René Lodge Brabazon Raymond; 24 December 1906; London, England
- Died: 6 February 1985 (aged 78); Corseaux-sur-Vevey, Switzerland
- Occupation: Novelist
- Spouse: Sylvia Ray (1932–1985)
- Children: 1
- Writing career
- Pen name: James L. Docherty; Raymond Marshall; R. Raymond; Ambrose Grant
- Language: English
- Genres: Crime fiction, mystery, thriller, detective
- Movement: Golden Age of Detective Fiction

René Lodge Brabazon Raymond (24 December 1906 – 6 February 1985), best known by the pen name James Hadley Chase, was an English author of crime fiction. He is one of the best known thriller writers of all time. The canon of Chase, comprising 90 titles, earned him a reputation as the king of thriller writers in Europe. He was also one of the internationally best-selling authors, and to date 50 of his books have been made into films.

== Early life ==
Born René Lodge Brabazon Raymond on 24 December 1906 in London, England, he was the son of Colonel Francis Raymond of the colonial Indian Army, a veterinary surgeon. His father intended his son to have a scientific career and had him educated at King's School, Rochester, Kent.

== Writing career ==
After Chase left home at the age of 18, he worked in sales, primarily focusing on books and literature. He sold children's encyclopaedias as well as working in a bookshop. He also served as an executive for a book wholesaler, before turning to a writing career that produced more than 90 mystery books. His interests included photography, of a professional standard, reading, and listening to classical music and opera. As a form of relaxation between novels, he put together highly complicated and sophisticated Meccano models.

Prohibition and the ensuing Great Depression in the US (1929–39) had given rise to the Chicago gangster culture prior to World War II. This, combined with Chase's book trade experience, convinced him that there was a big demand for gangster stories. After reading James M. Cain's novel The Postman Always Rings Twice (1934), and having read about the American gangster Ma Barker and her sons, and with the help of maps and a slang dictionary, he wrote No Orchids for Miss Blandish in his spare time, he claimed over a period of six weekends, though his papers suggest it took longer. The book achieved remarkable notoriety and became one of the best-selling books of the decade. It was the subject of the 1944 essay "Raffles and Miss Blandish" by George Orwell. Chase and Robert Nesbitt adapted it to a stage play of the same name which ran in London's West End to good reviews. The 1948 film adaptation was widely denounced as salacious due to the film's portrayal of violence and sexuality. Robert Aldrich did a remake, The Grissom Gang, in 1971.

During World War II, Raymond served in the Royal Air Force, achieving the rank of Squadron Leader. He edited the RAF Journal with David Langdon and had several stories from it published after the war in the book Slipstream: A Royal Air Force Anthology. From that period comes Chase's short story "The Mirror in Room 22", in which he tried his hand outside the crime genre. It was set in an old house, occupied by officers of a squadron. The owner of the house had committed suicide in his bedroom, and the last two occupants of the room had been found with a razor in their hands and their throats cut. The Wing Commander tells that when he started to shave before the mirror, he found another face in it. The apparition drew the razor across his throat. The Wing Commander says, "I use a safety razor, otherwise, I might have met with a serious accident – especially if I had been using an old-fashioned cut-throat." The story was published under the author's real name, Rene Raymond, in the anthology of RAF writings Slipstream in 1946. In later collections, the story began to be published with his better known pseudonym James Hadley Chase.

During World War II, Chase became friendly with Merrill Panitt (then an officer with General Eisenhower's staff and subsequently editor of TV Guide), who provided him with a dictionary of American slang, detailed maps and reference books of the American underworld. This gave Chase the background for his early books with American settings, a number of which were based on actual events occurring there. Chase never lived in the United States though he did make two brief visits, one to Miami and the other en route to Mexico.

Over the years, Chase developed a distinct, signature style in his writing that was fast-paced, with little explanations or details about the surroundings or weather, unreliable characters. Characters in his novels and short stories would be more coherent and consistent who acted and reacted with unbreakable logic. Punchy sentences, short bursts of dialogue in authentic sounding slang with plenty of action were the characteristics of his writing.

Chase was subject to several court cases during his career. In 1942, his novel Miss Callaghan Comes to Grief (1941), a lurid account of the white slave trade, was banned by the British authorities after the author and publishers Jarrold were found guilty of causing the publication of an obscene book. Each was fined £100. In the court case, Chase was supported by literary figures such as H. E. Bates and John Betjeman. Later, the Anglo-American crime author Raymond Chandler successfully claimed that Chase had lifted a section of his work in Blonde's Requiem (published 1945) forcing Chase to issue an apology in The Bookseller.

By the end of World War II, eleven Chase titles had been published and he decided to adopt a different writing approach. All of his books to date had been compared to each other, and he wanted to move away from the American gangster scene to the London underworld that had sprung up following the end of German hostilities. He wrote More Deadly Than the Male under a new pseudonym, Ambrose Grant, and it was published in 1947 by Eyre and Spottiswoode, Graham Greene's publisher at that time. Alerted to Grant's new book, Greene gave it high praise as did the critics who, at the time, had no idea that Chase was the author. Contrary to rumour, the two authors did not know each other at the time, though they then became friends for the remainder of their lives, as Chase's papers and letters reveal. In the early 1960s, both men were caught up in an investment scandal involving Tom Roe which was to lead to Greene's tax exile beginning in 1966.

In one of the chapters of The Wary Transgressor (1952) Chase gave a portrayal of a fanatical British General that was lifted by Hans Hellmut Kirst in his novel The Night of the Generals (which later became a film starring Peter O'Toole in the title role). Chase (who had nothing whatsoever to do with the making of the film) threatened a lawsuit, and Kirst subsequently acknowledged Chase's original idea in his book, as did Columbia Pictures, who included a credit that the plot of the film stemmed from an original Chase idea.

The first cut of Joseph Losey's 1962 film version of Chase's thriller Eve (1945), Eva was considered too long, at 155 minutes, and the producers, the Hakim Brothers, insisted it not only be withdrawn from the Venice Film Festival, but be severely cut. When the film finally opened in Paris at 116 minutes, it was described as the most traumatic disaster of Losey's career. The original book was a psychological study of a prostitute (Chase, with his wife's blessing, picked out a "lady of the night" and offered her £5 and a good lunch if she would let him pick her brains). Set in America, the film version was moved to Venice and starred Stanley Baker as a Welsh writer obsessed with a cold-hearted femme fatale, Eve (Jeanne Moreau).

All of his novels were so fast-paced that the reader was compelled to turn the pages in a non-stop effort to reach the end of the book. The final page often produced a totally unexpected plot twist that would invariably leave even his most die-hard fans surprised. His early books contained some violence that matched the era in which they were written, though this was considerably toned down as plots centred more on circumstantial situations to create the high degree of tension that was the hallmark of his writing. Sex was never explicit and, though often hinted at, seldom happened.

In several of Chase's stories, the protagonist tries to get rich by committing a crime – an insurance fraud or a theft. But the scheme invariably fails and leads to a murder and finally to a cul-de-sac, in which the hero realises that he never had a chance to keep out of trouble. Women are often beautiful, clever, and treacherous; they kill unhesitatingly if they have to cover a crime. His plots typically centre around dysfunctional families, and the final denouement echoes the title.

In many of his novels, treacherous women play a significant role. The protagonist falls in love with one and is prepared to kill someone at her behest. Only when he has killed, does he realise that the woman was manipulating him for her own ends.

Chase's best market was France (more than 30 books were made into movies) where all of his ninety titles were published by Éditions Gallimard in their Série noire series. He was also very popular in other European markets, as well as Africa and Asia. Following perestroika, Centrepolygraph in Russia contracted to publish all his titles. However, his books failed to take hold in the American market.

=== Mark Girland ===
Just as Sherlock Holmes was the fictional detective created by Arthur Conan Doyle and James Bond by Ian Fleming, Mark Girland was created by Chase. Mark Girland is not the usual secret agent. He looks more like an unrefined version of James Bond. He is erratic and genial but also ruthless when he has to be. He is tough too, though he always comes across as quite likeable and charming. He is somewhat like a playboy too. Women often fall for him, though he is honest enough to tell them that he could never stay permanently with one woman. He unashamedly enjoys the fine things of life. Despite all his "vices", he comes out a winner in all his adventures.

== Pen names ==
Aside from his best known nom de plume, Chase was also variously credited as James L. Docherty, Raymond Marshall, R. Raymond, and Ambrose Grant.

== Personal life ==
In 1932, Chase married Sylvia Ray, and they had a son. In 1956, they moved to France. In 1969, they moved to Switzerland, living a secluded life in Corseaux-sur-Vevey, on Lake Geneva.

Chase died in Corseaux-sur-Vevey on 6 February 1985.

== Published works ==
=== James Hadley Chase ===
Year published	Title	Central character(s)	Film adaptations
1939	No Orchids for Miss Blandish also The Villain and the Virgin	Dave Fenner; Slim Grisson; Miss Blandish	No Orchids for Miss Blandish (1948); The Grissom Gang (1971)
1940	The Dead Stay Dumb	Dillon; Roxy; Myra	
1941	Twelve Chinks and a Woman also Twelve Chinamen and a Woman also The Doll's Bad News	Dave Fenner; Glorie Leadler	
1941	Miss Callaghan Comes to Grief	Jay Ellinger; Raven	Méfiez-vous fillettes (1957)
1942	Get a Load of This (short story collection)		
1944	Miss Shumway Waves a Wand	Ross Millan; Myra Shumway	Une blonde comme ça (1962); Rough Magic (1995)
1945	Eve	Clive Thurston; Eve Carol	Eva (1962); Eva (2018)
1946	I'll Get You for This	Chester Cain, Miss Wonderly, Killeano, Fleggerty	I'll Get You for This (1951)
1947	The Last Page (play)		The Last Page (1952)
1948	The Flesh of the Orchid (novel)	Carol Blandish; The Sullivan Brothers	La Chair de l'orchidée (1975)
1949	You Never Know with Women	Floyd Jackson	
1949	You're Lonely When You're Dead	Vic Malloy; Paula Bensinger; Jack Kerman	
1950	Figure It Out for Yourself also The Marijuana Mob	Vic Malloy; Paula Bensinger; Jack Kerman	
1950	Lay Her Among the Lilies; ASIN B001GD0R8K	Vic Malloy; Paula Bensinger; Jack Kerman	Die Katze im Sack (1965)
1951	Strictly for Cash	Johnny Farrar Della	
1952	The Fast Buck also The Soft Touch	Verne Baird; Rico; Ed Dallas	
1952	Double Shuffle	Steve Harmas, Hellen Harmas, Maddux	
1953	I'll Bury My Dead	Nick English Morilli	
1953	This Way for a Shroud	Paul Conard; Vito Ferrari	
1954	Tiger By the Tail	Ken Holland; Lieutenant Harry Adams	The Man in the Raincoat (1957); Kashmakash (1973); Akalmand (1984); 88 Antop Hill (1984)
1954	Safer Dead also Dead Ringer	Chet Sladen	
1955	You've Got It Coming	Harry Griffin	Он своё получит (On svoyo poluchit) (Russian, 1992)
1956	There's Always a Price Tag	Glyn Nash, Steve Harmas	Retour de manivelle (1957); Maharathi (2008)
1957	The Guilty Are Afraid	Lew Brandon	
1958	Not Safe to Be Free also The Case of the Strangled Starlet	Jay Delaney	Le Démoniaque (1968)
1959	Shock Treatment	Steve Harmas, Terry Regan	Ek Nari Do Roop (1973), Joshila (1973)
1959	The World in My Pocket	Morgan	World in My Pocket (1961); Мираж (Mirazh) (1983)
1960	What's Better Than Money	Jefferson Halliday	
1960	Come Easy – Go Easy	Chet Carson	Chair de poule (1963)
1961	A Lotus for Miss Quon	Steve Jaffe	Lotus Flowers for Miss Quon (1967)
1961	Just Another Sucker	Harry Barber, John Renick	Dans la gueule du loup (1961) Bullet (1976); Palmetto (1998)
1962	I Would Rather Stay Poor	Dave Calvin	The Catamount Killing (1974)
1962	A Coffin from Hong Kong	Nelson Ryan	Coffin from Hong Kong (1964)
1963	One Bright Summer Morning		Crime on a Summer Morning (1965); 36 Ghante (1974)
1963	Tell It to the Birds	Steve Harmas, John Anson, Maddox	
1964	The Soft Centre	Frank Terrell; Valiere Burnette	
1965	This Is for Real	Mark Girland	
1965	The Way the Cookie Crumbles	Frank Terrell, Ticky Edris, Phil Algir	Trop petit mon ami (fr) (1970)
1966	You Have Yourself a Deal	Mark Girland	The Blonde from Peking (1968)
1966	Cade	Val Cade	
1967	Have This One on Me	Mark Girland	
1967	Well Now – My Pretty	Frank Terrell	Казино (Casino) (Russian, 1992)
1968	An Ear to the Ground	Steve Harmas, Al Barney	
1968	Believed Violent	Frank Terrell, Jay Delaney	Présumé dangereux (1990)
1969	The Whiff of Money	Mark Girland	
1969	The Vulture Is a Patient Bird	Max Kahlenberg	Shalimar (1978)
1970	Like a Hole in the Head	Jay Benson	Снайпер (Snayper) (Russian, 1991)
1970	There's a Hippie on the Highway	Frank Terrell, Harry Mitchell	Бухта смерти (Bukhta smerti) (Russian, 1991)
1971	Want to Stay Alive?	Poke Toholo	Le Denier du colt (1990)
1971	An Ace Up My Sleeve	Helga Rolfe	Crime and Passion (1976)
1972	Just a Matter of Time	Chris Patterson; Sheila Oldhill; Miss Morely-Johnson	Not Dumb, The Bird (1972)
1972	You're Dead Without Money	Al Barney	
1973	Have a Change of Scene	Larry Carr	
1973	Knock, Knock! Who's There?	Johnny Bianda	
1974	So What Happens To Me?	Jack Crane	
1974	Goldfish Have No Hiding Place	Steve Manson	
1975	Believe This – You'll Believe Anything	Clay Burden	
1975	The Joker in the Pack	Helga Rolfe	
1976	Do Me a Favour, Drop Dead	Keith Devery	
1977	My Laugh Comes Last	Larry Lucas	The Set-Up (1995)
1977	I Hold the Four Aces	Helga Rolfe	
1978	Consider Yourself Dead	Mike Frost	
1979	You Must Be Kidding	Ken Brandon; Tom Lepski; Paradise City Police Force	
1979	A Can of Worms	Bart Anderson	
1980	You Can Say That Again	Jerry Stevens	
1980	Try This One for Size	Paradise City Police Force	Try This One for Size (1989)
1980	Hand Me a Fig Leaf	Dirk Wallace	
1982	Have a Nice Night		Passez une bonne nuit (1990)
1982	We'll Share a Double Funeral	Perry Weston; Chet Logan	
1983	Not My Thing	Ernie Kling	
1984	Hit Them Where It Hurts	Dirk Wallace	

=== Raymond Marshall ===
Year published	Title	Central character(s)	Film adaptations
1940	Lady, Here's Your Wreath	Nick Mason	Mem Saab (1971)
1944	Just The Way It Is	Harry Duke	
1945	Blonde's Requiem	Mack Spewack	
1947	Make The Corpse Walk	Rollo Susan Putch ||	
1947	No Business of Mine	Steve Harmas	
1948	Trusted Like the Fox also Ruthless	Edwin Cushman; Grace Clark; Richard Crane	
1949	The Paw in the Bottle	Julie Holland; Harry Gleb	
1950	Mallory	Martin Corridon	
1951	But a Short Time to Live also The Pick-up	Harry Ricks; Clair Dolan	A Little Virtuous (1968)
1951	Why Pick on Me?	Martin Corridon	
1951	In A Vain Shadow	Frank Mitchell	
1952	The Wary Transgressor	David Chisholm	
1953	The Things Men Do	Harry Collins	Ça n'arrive qu'aux vivants (1959)
1954	The Sucker Punch	Chad Winters; Vestal Shelley; Lt. Leggit	A Kiss for a Killer (1957); Aar Ya Paar (Hindi 1997)
1954	Mission To Venice	Don Micklem	Mission to Venice (1964)
1955	Mission To Siena	Don Micklem	Mark of the Tortoise (1964)
1956	You Find Him, I'll Fix Him	Ed Dawson	Les Canailles (1960)
1958	Hit And Run	Chester Scott	Délit de fuite (1959); Rigged (1985)

=== Others ===
- He Wont Need It Now (as James L. Docherty, 1941)
- The Mirror in Room 22 — Slipstream: A Royal Air Force Anthology (as R. Raymond, 1946)
- More Deadly Than the Male (as Ambrose Grant, 1947)
- There's a Hippie on the Highway, Bollywood movie Victoria 203, 1972

== See also ==
- Le Monde's 100 Books of the Century
