= The Fast Buck =

1952 novel by James Hadley Chase

- First edition
- Author: James Hadley Chase
- Original title: The Soft Touch
- Language: English
- Publisher: Robert Hale
- Publication date: 1952
- Publication place: UK

The Fast Buck, also known as The Soft Touch, is a 1952 thriller mystery novel by British author James Hadley Chase.

== Synopsis ==
The fast buck runs around a complexed set of events and interactions between different people out to find a hidden Indian treasure with different intentions, soon involving a ruthless criminal who is on the run after a homicide in an attempted robbery.

== Plot ==
The story opens with hotelier Ralph Rico rendezvousing with acquaintance Verne Baird, a ruthless killer who has just knocked off actress Jean Bruce to steal her necklace, and wants Rico to sell it safely for him. Baird then runs for safety. Officer Olin shortly comes in and reveals that Jean Bruce has died and he strongly suspects Baird, but Rico denies any knowledge of the killer or the necklace.

It is then shown that the Maharajah of Chittabad in India has come to claim a treasure of Indian jewels that his father had shipped to New York to donate to a museum long back, but was stolen and its whereabouts unknown, although the thief who attempted the robbery, Paul Hater, is serving a prison sentence due to end in two years. The Rajah now wants the insurance company to make good the loss of the treasure, but the latter suspect that he is trying to exploit them by finding the treasure for himself and disposing it whilst making a false claim for insurance money, and have employed private investigator Harmon Purvis' agency to spy on him. Ed Dallas, sidekick to Purvis, spies on a couple visiting the Rajah and reports his findings to his boss. The couple are one Preston Kile from San Francisco and his companion Eve Gillis.

Olin finds Baird and pursues him, but as fate would have it, Baird lands up in the apartment of Anita Jackson, a waitress, who hides him from the police and nurses him to good health for days, much to Baird's surprise, in return for nothing. For some reason, Anita hates the police. Baird then gets time to prepare an alibi with friends in New York, and Olin is not able to pin the homicide-robbery on him. Baird develops a fascination for Anita and decides to meet her again.

Next the plot moves to Preston Kile, a broke Stock exchange manipulator and roadside romeo, and Eve Gillis, an ex model, staying with him. She convinces him to agree to find the Rajah's treasure for the Rajah against all odds. But Eve is actually working in hand with her wayward brother Adam Gillis, both of whom wish to usurp the Rajah's prize money and then ditch Kile.

Kile and Eve decide to 'kidnap' Hater from the Bellmore State Prison Farm and obtain the treasure whereabouts from him, as advised by Adam, and they meet Rico to find someone for this, who suggests Baird for a commission; the killer agrees to do the work for 10,000 dollars if he succeeds and 5000 even if he fails. Rico in the meantime gives the stolen necklace to Kile for safe disposal. Adam later scrutinises Kile's apartment secretly and notes this.

Baird's movements are noted by Purvis' agents spying on everyone. Baird however notes this, and thinks there's more than meets the eye. He understands Kile's intention behind kidnapping Hater. Baird ends up killing Dallas' girlfriend Zoe Norton spying on him for Dallas' sake, and brutally wounds two of Purvis' detectives too.

Baird is now on the run as he and Rico are seen fleeing by Dallas after killing Zoe, with a look out notice for him everywhere, and a helpless Rico, witness to his activities, is forced to run with him, leaving behind his club and businesses. Baird sets off with Rico to kidnap Hater from the Red river swamps. They break away with Hater being brought to them by Baird's inside man Noddy, whom Baird kills when Noddy tries to double cross and kill them.

Unfortunately lady luck does not smile on Baird and Rico anymore. An attack dog fatally bites Baird's left arm, and he takes ill soon after the bite with rapid sepsis, and the prison police soon catch up with them on the riverbank. Rico is shot in the ensuing scuffle and soon attacked and devoured by an alligator in the river. Baird decides to go to the Maharajah directly and deliver Hater.

The plot now switches to Adam Gillis and his sister. Adam secretly watches Kile waiting for Baird at the pre decided location to receive Hater. He then anonymously calls the police and informs them that Kile has the missing necklace they're looking for, and Kile is arrested. He then proceeds to Eve's apartment, where it is revealed that Adam was all along in hand with the Chittabad Maharajah, and had planned the whole game with him. Adam had previously helped the Rajah in India, and the latter tasked him with finding his treasure by extracting information from Hater, in return for a job in India. Adam was only using Eve and Kile as stooges to get Hater out, should in case anything go wrong. But now that the plan has failed and Baird is delivering Hater by himself, Adam didn't need Kile anymore and got rid of him by tipping police about the necklace. Adam tells Eve to come with him to India to become the Rajah's concubine, to which Eve flatly refuses. In anger Adam tries to kill Eve but is stopped by the spying Dallas. He sends them both to hospital.

The last phase and twist of the story moves to Baird. Slowly dying of gangrene and sepsis, he forgets about the gagged and bound Hater with him and drives to Anita's apartment to meet her. Olin and Dallas arrive with cops, and both question Anita. Hater is found dead of suffocation and injury in Baird's car already. At this point it is revealed by Anita that Hater was actually her father, and she was waiting for him all these years to return. Dallas sends Anita to meet the sick but armed Baird alone in her apartment. Anita tells Baird who actually Hater was, and Baird says he didn't mean to kill him. She also tells him at this point that there really is no treasure existent now because it was taken by her mother (Hater's wife) when Hater was arrested long back, abroad on a ship which sank with the treasure but her mother was saved and she moved on with life. Anita helped Baird because she dislikes police for what they did to Hater. Anita then leaves, and Olin and Dallas confront Baird. A now remorseful Baird requests them not to charge Anita with sheltering him before, and dies.

Olin decides to leave Anita out of the case. Prodded by Purvis, Dallas speaks to Anita and offers her money for any information on the treasure, but she flatly denies knowledge about it and walks away. The impressed Dallas offers to help Anita in future.

== Character list ==
- Ralph Rico - Hotelier with underhand connections
- Verne Baird - Ruthless Killer
- Jean Bruce - Actress
- Harmon Purvis - Private detective, with subordinates spying on everyone in the case
- Ed Dallas - Sidekick working for Purvis
- Maharajah of Chittabad
- Paul Hater - Jewel thief
- Preston Kile - Stock market manipulator and Eve's compatriot
- Eve Gillis - Kile's compatriot and Adam's sister
- Adam Gillis - Eve's brother
- Anita Jackson - Waitress
- Olin - Policeman investigating the case
- Zoe Norton - Dallas girlfriend
- Noddy- Inside man for Baird
