= Mallory (novel) =

1950 novel by James Hadley Chase

- Cover of the first paperback edition (1954).
- Author: James Hadley Chase
- Language: English
- Publication date: 1950

Mallory is a 1950 thriller novel by British writer James Hadley Chase. Mallory is one of the eighteen novels Chase published under the pen name Raymond Marshall.

== Plot summary ==
The leader of a small French resistance group who was betrayed to the Gestapo by one of the group's own members had died and the group came to London after World War II to avenge the death of their leader. But the traitor, Mallory, proved more than a match for them, and two corpses later, the remaining three called in outside help. They chose Martin Corridon, an ex-commando, who accepted the job and planned a neat double-cross of his own once he had the money. But it didn't quite work out that way: Corridon found himself trailing Mallory from the dens of Soho to the wilds of a remote Scottish island.
