= Charley Moon =

1956 British film by Guy Hamilton

- Theatrical release poster (UK)
- Directed by: Guy Hamilton
- Written by: Leslie Bricusse from the novel by Reginald Arkell
- Produced by: Leslie Bricusse; John Cresswell
- Starring: Max Bygraves; Dennis Price; Michael Medwin; Shirley Eaton
- Cinematography: Jack Hildyard
- Music by: Francis Chagrin
- Production company: Colin Lesslie Productions
- Distributed by: British Lion Films
- Release date: 1 May 1956
- Running time: 92 minutes
- Country: United Kingdom
- Language: English
- Box office: £159,641 (UK)

Charley Moon is a 1956 British musical film directed by Guy Hamilton and starring Max Bygraves, Dennis Price and Shirley Eaton. The screenplay and lyrics are by Leslie Bricusse. The story is based on Reginald Arkell's novel of the same name.

== Plot summary ==
Charley Moon is a country boy who, after a national service stint in the army, becomes a small-time music-hall performer. After a few lucky breaks, he finds himself popular and the star of a musical hit in London's West End. Initially successful, Moon soon decides that showbiz is a facile occupation, and he longs to return to his childhood home. He eventually finds himself back where he started.

== Cast ==
- Max Bygraves as Charley Moon
- Dennis Price as Harold Armytage
- Michael Medwin as Alf Higgins
- Florence Desmond as Mary Minton
- Shirley Eaton as Angel Dream
- Patricia Driscoll as Rose
- Charles Victor as Miller Moon
- Reginald Beckwith as vicar
- Cyril Raymond as Bill
- Eric Sykes as brother-in-law
- Peter Jones as Stewart
- Jane Asher as Benesta
- Anthony Bygraves as young Charley Moon

== Production ==
It was filmed at Pinewood Studios, and on location in Upton Grey and Greywell, Hampshire.

== Critical reception ==
The Monthly Film Bulletin wrote: "This faltering attempt at a British musical chiefly makes one regret the lost efficiency and certainty, the unaffected freshness of British musicals of the early 'thirties, like Evergreen. The script is slack and wandering; the back-stage music hall atmosphere is embarrassingly phoney; the characters are mainly threadbare types – comic vicar, comic ham, comic temperamental star, comic north country impresario, comic Yiddish agent, loveable village personalities. The numbers are very casually staged and derive – distantly – from the more intimate style of the early 'thirties or the "advanced" realist-stylised manner of the late 'forties. The great misfortune of the whole thing is that Max Bygraves is most sympathetic and really talented, and that the story, fairly done, might have had genuine charm."

The Radio Times Guide to Films gave the film 3/5 stars, writing: "Offering fewer insights into the loneliness of the long-distance performer than, say, John Osborne's The Entertainer, the film nevertheless has a ring of authenticity."
