= I'll Get You for This =

1951 British film by Joseph M. Newman

- U.S. theatrical release poster
- Directed by: Joseph M. Newman
- Written by: George Callahan; William Rose
- Based on: novel I'll Get You for This by James Hadley Chase
- Produced by: Joe Kaufmann
- Starring: George Raft; Coleen Gray; Enzo Staiola; Charles Goldner
- Cinematography: Otto Heller
- Edited by: Russell Lloyd
- Music by: Walter Goehr
- Production company: Romulus Films
- Distributed by: Independent Film Distributors; 20th Century Fox (US)
- Release date: January 1951 (UK)
- Running time: 87 minutes
- Country: United Kingdom
- Language: English

I'll Get You for This (released in the US as Lucky Nick Cain) is a 1951 British thriller film by Joseph M. Newman starring George Raft, Coleen Gray, and Enzo Staiola. It was made from an adaptation by George Callahan and William Rose of James Hadley Chase's 1946 book of the same name. The setting was shifted from Las Vegas in the novel to an Italian gambling resort.

It was one of the first productions by Romulus Films. Production was completed in 1950 but the film was not released until the following year.

The sets were designed by the art director Ralph W. Brinton. Established actresses Greta Gynt and Margot Grahame and future Irish star Constance Smith all make brief appearances.

== Plot ==
American gambler Nick Cain arrives at the town of San Paola, and befriends shoe-shine boy Toni. He discovers he has been framed for the murder of an American Treasury agent. He escapes with Kay Wonderly to an abandoned village, leaving her to hide out. Cain gets help from Massine, whom he does not trust. He uncovers an international counterfeiting ring, members of which are responsible for the murder.

== Cast ==
- George Raft as Nick Cain
- Coleen Gray as Kay Wonderly
- Enzo Staiola as Toni
- Charles Goldner as Massine
- Walter Rilla as Müller
- Martin Benson as Frankie Sperazza
- Peter Illing as Armando Ceralde
- Hugh French as Miles Travers
- Peter Bull as Hans
- Elwyn Brook-Jones as the Fence
- Constance Smith as Nina
- Greta Gynt as Claudette Ambling
- Margot Grahame as Mrs Langley
- Donald Stewart as Kennedy

== Production ==
Raft's signing was announced in November 1949. William Bowers was adapting James Hadley Chase's novel and filming was to take place in San Remo (Italy) and London. John and James Woolf of Romulus Films were to be co-producers. (Raft would go on to make several films in Europe.)

When Raft left for London in December it was announced that he would also make a second film for Kaufman, Montmare, about a Paris night club owner.

Joseph Newman sailed for London on January 12, 1950. Nadia Gray, Pat Roc and Joanne Dru were those offered the female lead before Coleen Gray took the role. Gray left for England i March 1950.

The film was made at Teddington Studios in London and on location around San Remo on the Mediterranean coast in northern Italy.

Peter Lorre was initially intended to appear as Massine, but the role eventually went to Charles Goldner.

Filming started in San Remo on April 24, 1950. Grey later said the trip to make the film "was the highlight of my life."

Editing was finished by September.

In January 1951 Kaufman signed a deal with 20th Century Fox for the latter to distribute.

== Sources ==
- Youngkin, Stephen. The Lost One: A Life of Peter Lorre. University Press of Kentucky, 2005.
