= Corinne Lahaye =

French actress (1947–2020)

- Born: 28 March 1947; Bois-Colombes, France
- Died: 16 February 2020 (aged 72)
- Other names: Corinne Darras
- Occupation: Actress

Corinne Lahaye (28 March 1947 – 16 February 2020) was a French actress. She was married to Jean-Pierre Darras.

== Biography ==
Lahaye graduated from CNSAD in 1969. She starred in numerous comedies in the 1970s and 80s. She was President of the Estivales de Carpentras from 2000 until it folded in 2009.

Lahaye died on 16 February 2020 at the age of 72.

== Filmography ==
- Au théâtre ce soir : Les Compagnons de la marjolaine (1968)
- Du blé en liasses (1969)
- Au théâtre ce soir : Colinette (1971)
- Bastos ou Ma sœur préfère le colt 45 (1971)
- Not Dumb, The Bird (1972)
- Au théâtre ce soir : Le Million (1973)
- Molière pour rire et pour pleurer (1973)
- Now Where Did the 7th Company Get to? (1973)
- Opération Lady Marlène (1974)
- Au théâtre ce soir : Madame Sans Gêne (1974)
- Le Jour de gloire (1976)
- Au théâtre ce soir : Nuit folle (1977)
- Pauline et l'ordinateur (1978)
- Au théâtre ce soir : Une nuit chez vous Madame (1979)
- On n'est pas sorti de l'auberge (1982)
- Te marre pas ... c'est pour rire ! (1982)
- Jamais avant le mariage (1982)
- Le Bourgeois gentilhomme (1982)
- Le Braconnier de Dieu (1983)

== Theatre ==
- Le Cheval évanoui (1966–1968)
- Boeing-Boeing (1971)
- Madame Sans Gêne (1973)
- Duos sur canapé (1974)
- Pauvre Assassin (1977)
- Un Roi qu’a des malheurs (1979)
- Domino (1981)
- N'écoutez pas, mesdames ! (1991)
- Mr Perrichon's Holiday (1997)
- Le Dindon (2000)

== Discography ==
- Après moi (1985)
