= Eva (2018 film) =

2018 film

- Theatrical release poster
- Directed by: Benoît Jacquot
- Screenplay by: Benoît Jacquot
- Based on: Eve by James Hadley Chase
- Produced by: Marie-Jeanne Pascal; Mélita Toscan du Plantier
- Starring: Isabelle Huppert; Gaspard Ulliel; Julia Roy; Marc Barbé; Richard Berry
- Cinematography: Julien Hirsch
- Edited by: Julia Gregory
- Music by: Bruno Coulais
- Production companies: Macassar Productions; EuropaCorp; Arte France Cinéma; NJJ Entertainment; Scope Pictures
- Distributed by: EuropaCorp Distribution (France); Belga Films (Belgium)
- Release dates: 17 February 2018 (Berlin); 7 March 2018 (France and Belgium)
- Running time: 102 minutes
- Countries: France; Belgium
- Language: French
- Box office: $1.2 million

Eva is a 2018 romantic drama film written and directed by Benoît Jacquot, based on the 1945 novel Eve by James Hadley Chase. Starring Isabelle Huppert and Gaspard Ulliel, the film tells the story of a young fraudster who causes the death of a girl who loves him because of his obsession for an older high-class prostitute. It was selected to compete for the Golden Bear in the main competition section at the 68th Berlin International Film Festival.

== Plot ==
Bertrand, a handsome young man who works as a male prostitute in Paris, leaves an elderly writer dead in his bath and steals the typescript of his just-finished play. Selling it to a publisher as his own work, it proves a success. Both the work and the apparent author greatly impress the publisher's assistant Caroline, who soon has Bertrand sleeping in her flat.

The pressure is now on Bertrand to write a follow-up, and he retreats to a mountain chalet to work. There he meets an older woman who completely fascinates him. This is Eva, who lives in her husband's elegant house and works as an expensive prostitute. She says her husband is on a prolonged business trip, but it is revealed to viewers that he is in jail. Obsessed by the enigmatic character of Eva and the things she tells him, Bertrand tells his publisher that she will be the subject of his next work. The publisher secretly books a session with Eva to see if she is real.

Caroline, sensing that Bertrand is avoiding her, turns up secretly at the chalet and finds Eva in the bath. Rushing away in despair, she crashes her car and is killed. Bertrand goes secretly to Eva's house, where a stranger beats him up so thoroughly that he is hospitalised. When released, he sees Eva in the street with a man viewers know is her just-released husband. She signals wordlessly to Bertrand to keep away.

== Cast ==
- Isabelle Huppert as Eva
- Gaspard Ulliel as Bertrand Valade
- Julia Roy as Caroline
- Marc Barbé as Georges Martin
- Richard Berry as Régis Grant, the publisher
- Didier Flamand as Caroline's father
- Pascal Aubert as Jean-Louis
- Patrick Donnay as Richard
- Christian Erickson as Mr. Coulson
- Vincent Scarito as Alban
- Alexis van Stratum as Thierry

== Production ==
Principal photography began on 23 January 2017 with filming wrapping on 10 March 2017, taking place in Paris, Lyon and Annecy.

== Release ==
The film had its world premiere in the Competition section at the 68th Berlin International Film Festival on 17 February 2018. It was released in France on 7 March 2018.

== Reception ==
On review aggregator website Rotten Tomatoes, the film holds an approval rating of 14%, based on seven reviews, and an average rating of 4.9/10. On Metacritic, which assigns a normalized rating to reviews, the film has a weighted average score of 38 out of 100, based on 5 critics, indicating "generally unfavorable reviews".

David Ehrlich of IndieWire gave the film a grade of C−, writing: "Stuck between a high-class thriller and a trashy Cinemax wank, Benoît Jacquot's latest feature ultimately offers the pleasures of neither." Jordan Mintzer of The Hollywood Reporter wrote, "Eva slides off the rails during a denouement that goes full on B-movie without much credibility."

== See also ==
- Eva (1962 film), an earlier adaptation of the same novel
