= Safer Dead =

1954 novel by James Hadley Chase

- Cover of the first edition, published by Robert Hale. Art by J. Pollack.
- Author: James Hadley Chase
- Language: English
- Publisher: Robert Hale
- Publication date: 1954
- LC Class: PZ3.R2167 Saf

Safer Dead is a 1954 crime-mystery novel by British writer James Hadley Chase. The novel has Chet Sladen, a journalist, investigating the murder of Fay Benson, a night-club dancer.

== Plot summary ==
Fay Benson, a night-club dancer had been missing for 14 months but the police still didn't know if she was alive or dead. So when Chet Sladen, a journalist, began his own investigation, he didn't expect to find very much. Clues lead him to Tampa City which had the most inefficient, uncooperative police force in the country. The city was crawling with rackets, and the Commissioner was hand in glove with all of them. Sladen finds Fay Benson's body at the bottom of Lake Baldock, inside a barrel of cement. He follows clues which leads to numerous murders related to the Benson case but ultimately much to the detest of the Commissioner, Sladen solves the mystery.
