= You Must Be Kidding =

1979 novel by James Hadley Chase

First edition (publ. Robert Hale)

You Must Be Kidding is a crime thriller novel by English author James Hadley Chase, published in 1979.

== Synopsis ==
Insurance executive Ken Brandon breaks his marital vows when he becomes infatuated with his secretary. However, Brandon soon realizes that he is in trouble when he comes across a murder.

Investigating officer Tom Lepski takes the case and is sure that Brandon committed the crime. But then things get murkier, because more murders take place.
