= The Dead Stay Dumb =

1941 novel by James Hadley Chase

- First edition
- Author: James Hadley Chase
- Original title: The Dead Stay Dumb
- Language: English
- Publisher: Jarrolds
- Publication date: 1941
- Publication place: UK

The Dead Stay Dumb is a 1941 gangster novel written by British author James Hadley Chase.

== Synopsis ==
Dillon, a small time gunman, seeks to make a big break, and he stumbles across other gangsters and their girls, with whom initially he strikes a chord but soon falls out. The book traces the ruthless and selfish journey of Dillon from nomadic gunman to rich Gangster in Kansas, and the consequences he faces on the way, with a never ending pursuit of crime after crime and adversaries to follow him. The moral of the book is "Crime never pays".

== Plot ==
Ruthless gunman Dillon arrives in Plattsville town after being long off his activities, post his boss Nelson's demise. He is employed by good Samaritan store owner Abe Goldberg and comes in contact with Butch Hogan, a retired blind ex boxer involved in setting up boxing matches in the town. Myra Hogan, Butch's glamorous young daughter is reckless and in love with Nick Gurney, one of Butch's henchmen. At one point, Butch catches her with Gurney and Myra is forced to attack her father.

Butch has betted money on weaker boxer Sankey against a more efficient boxer Franks, and wants to fix the match for Sankey to win. Dillon does not want Abe's honest work and agrees to fix the match for Sankey by threatening Frank. But the undaunted Frank simply refuses to lose at the last moment and knocks down Sankey. With money on Sankey now lost, an enraged Butch with Sankey's manager and trainer confront Dillon at Butch's house, where Dillon simply shoots Butch dead. He then extorts money from Abe, and forces Gurney and Myra to accompany him.

The trio set off to the unknown, with Dillon seeking money and trying to enter gangster circles. They stumble at an abandoned cabin, where Dillon forces Myra to cook and Gurney to work for him. He soon gets a car and Thompson gun and they rob a bank. When Dillon does not give them a fair share in the money, Gurney and Myra decide to kill him. But Dillon escapes, and Gurney gets killed accidentally by Myra, and now totally left at his Mercy, she has no choice but to remain with him.

Dillon and Myra move to Kansas and meet Roxy, a small time offender trying to make it big with his compatriot offender Fanquist. Soon Dillon gets in touch with Hurst, the big time Don ruling half the city. When he and Myra save Hurst's life from adversary gangster Little Ernie's attempts to kill him, Dillon is given a job with Hurst.

Months later Dillon is a rich gangster in Kansas under the aegis of Hurst, with Myra now his mistress. Roxy approaches Dillon and is given a job. Dillon decides to further his gang and control, by taking over both Hurst and Ernie's empire as well. Soon Myra realizes that Dillon is keeping an affair with Fanquist. Enraged, she goes to warn Fanquist and kills her accidentally. Hurst is not pleased with Dillon's activities and confronts Dillon and Roxy, when Dillon shoots Hurst without a second thought. With Hurst's dead, Dillon loses the police protection he enjoyed. Dillon escapes with Myra and Roxy, killing Ernie and more goons en route. The trio meet Roxy's acquaintance Joe, who agrees to shelter them at his parents' isolated farmhouse for money. On route, they are attacked by a speeding biker cop, whom Dillon kills, but Myra is fatally shot.

Hiding at the farmhouse, Dillon and Roxy now start to lose their nerve with fear and uncertainty. Joe's intellectually disabled sister Chrissie at the farm takes a liking for Roxy though Roxy decides not to touch her, but Dillon had lustful eyes for Chrissie. Joe cons the duo into paying him more money for continued protection, saying that there's now a bounty on their heads. Dillon and Roxy find this untrue and kill Joe. Later Dillon tries to molest Chrissie at the farmhouse but she escapes. A disgusted Roxy attacks Dillon for this but is killed. Dillon buries him away from the farmhouse but Chrissie witnesses this.

Desperate and drunk, with almost everyone he knew now dead, crazy Dillon starts hallucinating visions of Chrissie. He enters her room at night, but is shocked to see Roxy's unearthed body placed on Chrissie's bed. Hiding in a corner with Roxy's gun in hand, Chrissie shoots Dillon.

== Character list ==
- Dillon - Ruthless gunman and protagonist of the story, he has no qualms in eliminating anyone and anything to achieve his ends. Dillon is experienced at his work, and has no interest in women, until later when he stays with Myra.
- Butch Hogan - Blind and ruthless ex boxer, Butch is involved with local goons in organizing and fixing boxing matches in the town. He is considered a terror in town whom no one wants to mess with.
- Nick Gurney - Butch's henchman and Myra's secret boyfriend, he organises match fixing for Butch, and longs to be with Myra but for her father.
- Myra Hogan - Butch's reckless glamorous daughter, initially in love with Gurney, later becomes Dillon's compatriot and live in partner when he expands his activities.
- Franks - Opponent boxer in Pittsville.
- Abe Goldberg - Dillon's generous employer, gives him employment in his store at Pittsville after Dillon fights off goons for him.
- Roxy - Small time offender in Kansas, later becomes Dillon's crime partner. Later Myra takes a liking for Roxy.
- Fanquist - Roxy's offender compatriot, she works with Roy and lives in with him in Kansas. There is no actual love for each other, but they live together to stay together in the business. Later Fanquist takes a liking for Dillon. Myra and Fanquist take a dislike for each other.
- Hurst - Big time gangster in Kansas ruling half the city.
- Little Ernie - Hurst's rival gangster in Kansas, he wants to override Hurst and take over the city.
- Joe - Acquaintance of Roxy, who arranges for him, Myra and Dillon to hide in his parents' isolated farmhouse for money.
- Chrissie - Joe's intellectually disabled sister, she is quite innocent and does not know who Dillon and Roxy are and why they have come to stay in the farmhouse. Chrissie plays a key role in the climax of the book.
- Ma Chester - Joe's mother, who lives in the farmhouse with her aged husband and Chrissie, where Dillon and Roxy go into hiding.
