= Eva (1962 film) =

1962 film by Joseph Losey

- U.S. film poster
- Directed by: Joseph Losey
- Screenplay by: Hugo Butler; Evan Jones
- Based on: Eve (1945 novel) by James Hadley Chase
- Produced by: Raymond Hakim; Robert Hakim
- Starring: Jeanne Moreau; Stanley Baker; Virna Lisi; Giorgio Albertazzi
- Cinematography: Gianni Di Venanzo
- Edited by: Reginald Beck; Franca Silvi
- Music by: Michel Legrand
- Production companies: Paris Film Productions; Interopa Film
- Distributed by: Rank (France); Cineriz (Italy)
- Release dates: August 1962 (Venice); 3 October 1962 (France); 13 October 1962 (Italy)
- Running time: 116 minutes (original); 109 minutes (cut)
- Country: France; Italy
- Language: English

Eva (released in the United Kingdom as Eve, and in the United States as Eva (the Devil's Woman)) is a 1962 psychological drama film directed by Joseph Losey and starring Jeanne Moreau, Stanley Baker, Virna Lisi and Giorgio Albertazzi. It is adapted by Hugo Butler and Evan Jones from James Hadley Chase's 1945 novel Eve. The story follows a Welsh novelist in Venice (Baker), who becomes obsessed with a high-class call girl (Moreau).

The film was an international co-production between French and Italian companies. Eva premiered at the 23rd Venice International Film Festival, where it was nominated for the Golden Lion. Losey later expressed disappointment with the final film, claiming it had been re-edited by the producers without his input.

== Plot ==
Tyvian Jones, a Welsh author from a working-class coal mining background, comes to Venice, rich and famous from the success of his first novel and its film adaptation by the Italian director Sergio Branco Mallone. Sergio and Tyvian compete for the affections of Sergio's assistant Francesca, who falls in love with Tyvian and gets engaged to him, but wants to keep her job with Sergio. Tyvian resents Sergio's demands on Francesca's time, but still accepts an advance from Sergio to begin writing a new novel, which Sergio hopes to film.

Francesca leaves on a business trip to Rome with Sergio, and Tyvian returns to his Venice house to find it occupied by local businessman Pieri and his "friend", a French call girl named Eve "Eva" Olivier. The couple broke in to take shelter after their boat's rudder failed in a storm. Initially angry, Tyvian finds himself strongly attracted to Eve and, after throwing Pieri out of the house, tries unsuccessfully to seduce her. Eve knocks him unconscious and leaves.

Tyvian tracks Eve to her penthouse apartment in Rome, where she has many clients. After pursuing her for several days, he finally succeeds in having sex with her. She indicates her primary interest is money, and warns him not to fall in love with her. His friends see him out with Eve, causing an upset Francesca to confront him and Sergio to berate and threaten him. Despite this negative fallout, Tyvian cannot resist spending an expensive weekend in Venice with Eve, where he reveals to her that his best-selling book was actually written by his deceased brother. Tyvian has begun to drink heavily and ends up publicly humiliated and rejected by Eve, who used the weekend to make money gambling and connecting with wealthy new clients.

Tyvian marries Francesca. Meanwhile, Sergio has discovered that Tyvian lied about his past and did not write the book published under his name, but cannot get Francesca to leave Tyvian. While Francesca is away working with Sergio, Tyvian trysts with Eve in his home. Francesca unexpectedly returns, discovers Tyvian with Eve, and, distraught, rushes away in a motorboat and dies in a crash. The night of her funeral, Tyvian breaks into Eve's apartment seeking comfort, but Eve drives him out with a riding whip and pushes him into a garbage pile.

Two years later, Sergio still mourns Francesca, while Tyvian haunts the bars of Venice and pursues a contemptuous Eve, who is planning to sail to the Greek islands with a wealthy Greek client.

== Cast ==
- Jeanne Moreau as Eve "Eva" Olivier
- Stanley Baker as Tyvian Jones
- Virna Lisi as Francesca Ferrari
- Giorgio Albertazzi as Sergio Branco Mallone
- James Villiers as Alan McCormick
- Lisa Gastoni as The red-headed Russian
- Riccardo Garrone as Michele
- Checco Rissone as Pieri
- Enzo Fiermonte as Enzo
- Nona Medici as Anna Maria
- Alexis Revidis as The Greek

The film features unbilled cameo appearances by Peggy Guggenheim (as a card player), Vittorio De Sica (as himself), and Losey.

== Production ==
“Losey’s bitter experience with Eve, coupled with his own independent temperament, ensured that he would never hire himself out as a genial company man, or as a popular director of commodity material.” — Biographer Foster Hirsch in Joseph Losey (1980).

Director Jean-Luc Godard was given the option to adapt James Hadley Chase's novel, with Richard Burton earmarked for the lead, but Godard declined. Actor Stanley Baker approached the Hakim brothers and recommended Losey, who had previously directed him in Blind Date (1959) and The Criminal (1960).

Eve was shot largely on location around Venice and Rome. The film's sets were designed by the art directors Richard Macdonald and Luigi Scaccianoce. Losey said he never would have normally chosen to make a film out of Chase's novel "but I made the film mine more than anything I have ever done." Studio interiors were shot at INCIR-De Paolis Studios in Rome. The costumes were designed by Pierre Cardin and Vera Marzot.

=== Editing and multiple versions ===
Losey said later the producers made cuts without his permission and the film was a disappointment to him. Losey's original director's cut was 155 minutes, he removed 20 minutes at the insistence of producers after the film's Venice Film Festival premiere. After a poor test screening in Paris, the producers cut it to 116 minutes. The film was further reduced to 101 minutes for its release in Britain, with two parts redubbed and a new music track. The American release, entitled The Devil’s Woman, was yet further reduced to 80 minutes.

The 116-minute cut was later released on a Kino Video DVD, albeit with burned-in Finnish subtitles. A 109-minute version was streamed on the Criterion Channel. A 107-minute version has also circulated.

== Critical reception ==
The New York Times concluded "Mr. Losey said the producer ruined it by cutting. The rejoinder is: He didn't cut it enough". While in a similarly unfavourable review, Dennis Schwartz opined, "The story itself is the film's main problem, because it is so unsettling and perverse. It never lets in any sunlight". However, Derek Winnert noted, "Losey's dark thriller is really rather effective and underrated, and the actors are spot on in tailor-made roles."

Variety called it "sleek, mannered".

=== Retrospective appraisal ===
Critic Dan Callahan calls the film "an endlessly fascinating mess, Losey's one truly personal, mysterious film."

Critic Eloise Rose writes, "While Losey may have been disappointed at the outcome of his film ... Eve is now considered one of the director's key works."

== Style ==
Critic Geoff Gardner at Senses of Cinema notes the importance Losey placed on elaborate sets designs and outrageous costumes in defining his film characters, arranged by designer Richard Macdonald:

Losey encouraged his regular designer Richard Macdonald to incorporate his elaborate settings, themselves designed to provide some running commentary on the characters who inhabited them: objects, curios and art works that gave even more emphasis and extravagance to the characters.

Gardner adds, "In Eve, mirrors, glasses, ashtrays, furniture, paintings, feathered costumes, even whiter than white bathrooms, were all relentlessly delivered by Macdonald in an attempt to create a view of high life, self-indulgence and casual wealth."

Biographer Foster Hirsch echoes this analysis: "[W]e are regaled by Losey's infatuation with elegant decor, with elaborate paintings and tapestries and statuary, with ornate mirrors and ceilings, with all the trappings of Continental sophistication."

Critics have dubbed Losey's visual ornamentation as "baroque," often approvingly. Eloise Ross at Senses of Cinema writes, "While Losey's style was often unfairly criticized as "baroque, or over-ornate" he often produced "perfectly balanced compositions."

Hirsch observes that Losey’s fulsome application of "baroque mannerism" serves as compensation for an inadequate screenplay: "[T]he film has nothing to rely on but the visual personality of its director."

=== Moreau's performance as Eva ===
Jeanne Moreau, in a 2001 interview with Senses of Cinema's Dan Callahan, recalled:

Losey gave me total freedom. We worked long before we started shooting. We knew where this woman came from, we knew where she was born, and what happened to her. With a great director like Losey, you don't speak when you shoot. We created Eve together.

Callahan adds this caveat regarding Losey's handling of her "purely instinctual" acting: "Moreau herself risks absurdity in ten-minute blocs where Losey keeps his camera on her and lets her create."

Critic Geoff Gardner in Senses of Cinema which Moreau's wordless performance is driven by detailed body language, she runs a bath to Billie Holiday's "Willow Weep for Me" on the record player, and mooches coolly around a bedroom. While she is enjoying her luxury, there is also a sense of boredom in her; hearing voices outside, she is restless, and smacks her lips together as though planning her next move ... in this early scene, Losey's directorial control comes through."

== Themes ==
Losey, in an effort to establish "dissonances between the sacred and profane," sprinkles the production with biblical metaphors: A tapestry records the expulsion of Adam and Eve from Paradise; Moreau "eats an apple." Film historian Raymond Durgnat in Films and Filming (April 1966) decodes other references in the narrative:

[T]he commentary and statuary relate the story to the biblical myth of The Fall - with money as the fruit, Venice as an ironic garden of Eden, and Eve as an ironic Eve.

Moreau, a modish Eve, is never at risk of suffering the fate of her Adam, played by Stanley Baker. Critic Foster Hirsch writes:

Eve is an amoral catalyst of male lust and insecurity; she is a remote femme fatale who wanders through the film creating havoc and then escapes untouched at the end, her own privacy unviolated.

Film critic Eloise Ross remarks on the nature of the Moreau-Eve amalgam:

With this reference to the Biblical Eve, could Eva be a story of the original woman? Unlikely. But Jeanne Moreau, perhaps now still but definitely in 1962, was close enough to a figure of the iconic woman, the utmost woman.

== See also ==
- Eva — A 2018 French film adaptation of Chase’s novel.

== Sources ==
- Callahan, Dan. 2003. Losey, Joseph. Senses of Cinema, March 2003. Great Directors Issue 25.https://www.sensesofcinema.com/2003/greatdirectors/losey/#:~text=The%20dominant%20themes%20of%20Losey's,love%20story%20in%20his%20films. Accessed 12 October, 2024.
- Gardner, Geoff. 2001. Unkind Cuts: Joseph Losey’s Eve. Senses of Cinema, December 2001. Underrated and Overlooked, Issue 18. https://www.sensesofcinema.com/2001/underrated-and-overlooked/losey_eve/ Accessed 12 November, 2024
- Hirsch, Foster. 1980. Joseph Losey. Twayne Publishers, Boston, Massachusetts. ISBN 0-8057-9257-0
- Palmer, James and Riley, Michael. 1993. The Films of Joseph Losey. Cambridge University Press, Cambridge, England. ISBN 0-521-38386-2
- Ross, Eloise. 2018. Eva (Josef Losey, 1962). Senses of Cinema, March 2018. Annotations of Film. Issue 86. https://www.sensesofcinema.com/2018/cteq/eva-1962/ Accessed 12 November, 2024.
