= No Business of Mine =

1947 novel by James Hadley Chase

First edition (publ. Jarrolds)

No Business of Mine is a 1947 action thriller novel by British writer James Hadley Chase (published under his pseudonym Raymond Marshall).

== Synopsis ==
Post-World War II USA newspaper correspondent Steve Harmas comes to London on official business, only to find that his one-time girlfriend Netta Scott has committed suicide under mysterious circumstances. Not believing that she would kill herself, Steve turns detective to finding the culprits behind the murder, before his policeman friend Inspector Corrigan can solve the mystery. But the brave journalist soon realizes he is going to get much more than what he expects.

== Story ==
Steve Harmas, American newspaper correspondent, comes after World War II to London, a place where he has had good memories, on official business, and finds that his girlfriend staying there has committed suicide under mysterious circumstances in her apartment. It appears that Netta Scott has set herself ablaze in the apartment. Her neighbors Madge Kennitt and Julius Cole appear to know things but are silent. The police conclude that it is suicide, but Harmas, knowing Netta not to be that type, thinks it is murder, and goes about trying to solve the case. He takes into confidence Inspector Corrigan, a long-time friend, who is known to solve all cases in the country. But Corrigan too simply puts him off, telling him that is suicide, and this leaves Harmas with no option but to solve the case all by himself, though it would not be "any of his business'.

Soon Netta's body is stolen, and Harmas and the police come to know that Netta's sister also has committed suicide the same way as Netta did. Tracing Netta's activities, Harmas soon comes across a friend of the deceased working in Bradley's bar, a tough guy and a goon. Inspector Corrigan repeatedly arrives wherever Harmas goes and warns him to stay out of this business, but he does not listen. His questions to Mbutis are simply thrown out. Soon Madge Kennitt is also brutally murdered, when Harmas tries to question her, but she leaves a clue - a handwritten name in the sand "Jacobi" which Harmas sees. He soon learns of Jacobi, who had pulled off a robbery successfully sometime ago and was later murdered, with the loot still missing, and of Selma Jacobi, his girlfriend. Soon Harmas and Bradley have an unpleasant showdown. Bradley sends goons to beat Harmas black and blue and threaten him to leave Great Britain. Harmas takes on the help of private detective Merryweather, who assigns Mr. Littlejohns to carry out work according to Harmas' advice. But Merryweather soon backs out after being threatened by Bradley. However, Littlejohns continues to work with Harmas secretly.

Harmas then decides to take on the goons himself. He beats Bradley black and blue, and learns that Netta Scott is actually alive and in hiding. He goes to Selma Jacobi's house, only to find that Mr. Littlejohns has been brutally murdered by Netta, who then tells him that she did it unknowingly by mistake. She then tells Harmas that she has been involved in the robbery against her will, and the murdered person was her sister Anne, and it was the same person found at both places. She pleads with Harmas to take her to the United States, to which he agrees. She hides in Madge Kennitt's flat.

Harmas and Netta plan to fly out of UK secretly with Harmas's pilot friend. But Julius Cole appears on scene and threatens to blackmail Harmas. However, Harmas later traps Julius Cole while he is taking money into revealing the truth about himself, and Julius gets arrested by the Scotland Yard police (not Corrigan).

The climax where Harmas and Netta are getting ready at the latter's flat to leave at night, when Corrigan breaks into the house to arrest Harmas. To everyone's surprise, Harmas then pushes Netta and takes a bag off her, containing all the robbery loot that Jacobi had pulled off. The cat is now out of the bag, as Harmas goes on to explain everything he has come to know in the case, and that Netta-Anne were one and the same. A bigger surprise then comes when Scotland yard police, secretly called by Harmas to the flat, come out of hiding, and Harmas points to Corrigan as being the murderer.

The novel ends with an epilogue, where Harmas and explain everything to his friends.
