= But a Short Time to Live =

1951 novel by James Hadley Chase

- First edition
- Author: James Hadley Chase
- Language: English
- Genre: Thriller
- Publisher: Jarrolds
- Publication date: 1951
- Publication place: United Kingdom
- Media type: Print

But a Short Time to Live is a 1951 crime thriller novel by the British writer James Hadley Chase. It was originally published under the pen name of Raymond Marshall. In the United States it was known by the alternative title The Pick-up.

In 1968 it was adapted into a French film A Little Virtuous directed by Serge Korber and starring Dany Carrel, Jacques Perrin and Robert Hossein.

== Bibliography ==
- Goble, Alan. The Complete Index to Literary Sources in Film. Walter de Gruyter, 1999.
- Server, Lee. Encyclopedia of Pulp Fiction Writers. Infobase Publishing, 2014.
