= You've Got It Coming =

1955 novel by James Hadley Chase

- Cover of the first edition, published by Robert Hale.
- Author: James Hadley Chase
- Language: English
- Publisher: Robert Hale
- Publication date: 1955

You've Got It Coming is a 1955 thriller novel by British author James Hadley Chase.

== Plot summary ==
Harry Griffin, an ace pilot in Californian Air Transport Corporation, is fired from service and is in a relationship with ex model and actress Glorie Dane, who has seen many a man come and go in her life, but loves Harry more than herself and does not want to lose him. Harry soon decides to steal a set of diamonds worth 3 million dollars from a passenger plane leaving CATC, which he was supposed to fly before being dismissed, to which Gloria reluctantly agrees. Soon they rope in Glorie's ex-boyfriend Ben Delaney, who is now a gangster with connections and money, under disguise by name "Harry Green". Ben agrees to provide them men and money to do the job, and 50000 dollars in exchange for the diamonds. But things don't go the way Harry and Glorie expect, especially because of Harry's greed and deceitful ways, and soon begins a deadly hide and seek game, with Glorie and Harry struggling for survival with murderers and cops behind them, and all amidst lies, deception, treachery, blackmail and murder.
