= Try This One for Size =

Try this One for Size
- Directed by: Guy Hamilton
- Written by: Sergio Gobbi; Alec Medieff; James Hadley Chase (novel)
- Based on: Try This One for Size by James Hadley Chase
- Starring: Michael Brandon; David Carradine
- Cinematography: Jean-Yves Le Mener
- Edited by: Georges Klotz
- Music by: Claude Bolling
- Release date: September 22, 1989
- Running time: 105 minutes
- Country: France
- Language: English

Try this One for Size (also known as Sauf votre respect) is a 1989 French film directed by Guy Hamilton and starring Michael Brandon and David Carradine. It is based on a 1980 novel of the same name by James Hadley Chase.

== Premise ==
An insurance investigator searches for a priceless medieval Russian icon stolen by a master thief.

== Cast ==
- Michael Brandon as Tom Lepski
- David Carradine as Bradley
- Arielle Dombasle as Maggie
- Guy Marchand as Ottovioni
- Mario Adorf as Radnitz
- Peter Bowles as Igor
