= Lotus Flowers for Miss Quon =

- Directed by: Jürgen Roland
- Written by: Jameson Brewer
- Based on: A Lotus for Miss Quon by James Hadley Chase
- Produced by: Wolf C. Hartwig
- Starring: Lang Jeffries; Francesca Tu; Werner Peters
- Cinematography: Rolf Kästel
- Edited by: Herbert Taschner
- Music by: Piero Umiliani
- Production companies: Rapid Film; Les Films Jacques Leitienne
- Distributed by: Gloria Film
- Release date: 31 March 1967
- Running time: 95 minutes
- Countries: France; Italy; West Germany
- Language: German

Lotus Flowers for Miss Quon (German: Lotosblüten für Miss Quon) is a 1967 thriller film directed by Jürgen Roland and starring Lang Jeffries, Francesca Tu and Werner Peters. Based on the 1961 novel A Lotus for Miss Quon by James Hadley Chase, it was made as a co-production between France, Italy and West Germany.

The film's sets were designed by the art director Peter Rothe. Location shooting took place around Hong Kong.

== Cast ==
- Lang Jeffries as Mark Jason
- Francesca Tu as Nhan Lee Quon
- Werner Peters as Charlie Lee
- Daniel Emilfork as Inspector Gonsart
- Sal Borgese as Jojo
- François Cadet as Wade
- Christa Linder as Stella
- Luciana Paoli as Anita
- Kam Re as Lam Than
- Tam Tin a Grandfather
- Gianni Rizzo as Blackie Lee
- Mai Chang as Mistress
- Dong Ham as Doctor
- Van Tho Nguyen as General
- My Lang To as Murdered Girlfriend
- Ann Fai Wan as Taxi Girl

== Bibliography ==
- Peter Cowie. Variety International Film Guide. Tantivy Press, 1967.
