= Trusted Like the Fox =

1948 novel by James Hadley Chase

Cover of the first edition, published by Jarrolds.

Trusted Like the Fox is a 1948 thriller novel by British author James Hadley Chase released under his pseudonym Raymond Marshall. The novel is also alternately titled Ruthless.

== Plot summary ==
The story is set in the World War II era, when Edwin Cushmann, political double crosser, changes his identity to David Ellis to escape the Allied Forces. He eventually meets a deaf girl named Grace Clark, who is trying hard to survive, whom he uses for protection, and both run to London, where Cushmann fractures his leg, and is left at the mercy of Grace, who cares for him like her own. Soon both come across a gentleman stranger by name Richard Crane, who shelters them in his house and does too many things for them, which leaves Grace highly impressed, even to the extent of believing that Crane is in love with her, but Cushmann highly suspicious.

With the police after Cushmann, and a girl who is believed to be with him, the local inspector James gets suspicious about Cushmann being in London, and begins to investigate with his subordinate Rogers. The rest of the story is about what happens to the three main characters.
