= Diamonds for Breakfast (film) =

1968 British film by Christopher Morahan

- Film poster
- Directed by: Christopher Morahan
- Written by: Ernesto Gastaldi; Ronald Harwood; Pierre Rouve; N. F. Simpson
- Produced by: Carlo Ponti
- Starring: Marcello Mastroianni
- Cinematography: Gerry Turpin
- Edited by: Peter Tanner
- Music by: Norman Kay
- Production companies: ABC Films; Bridge Films
- Distributed by: Paramount Pictures
- Release date: December 1968
- Running time: 102 minutes
- Country: United Kingdom
- Language: English
- Budget: $1.3 million

Diamonds for Breakfast is a 1968 British comedy film directed by Christopher Morahan. The film opened in London but was never released in the US. It recorded an overall loss of $1,445,000.

== Plot ==
Grand Duke Nicholas Wladimirovitch Goduno is a hard-up Russian aristocrat who owns a London boutique. At an art exhibition he slips on a banana skin and, recovering, hears the ghosts of his ancestors suggesting he steals the imperial diamonds. He assembles a team of female accomplices and posing as models they steal jewels by attaching them to carrier pigeons. However Nikolas's aunt ambushes the pigeons, and loses everything gambling in Monte Carlo.

== Cast ==
- Marcello Mastroianni as Grand Duke Nicholas Wladimirovitch Goduno
- Rita Tushingham as Bridget Rafferty
- Elaine Taylor as Victoria
- Margaret Blye as Honey
- Francesca Tu as Jeanne Silkingers
- The Karlins as triplets
- Warren Mitchell as Popov
- Nora Nicholson as Anastasia Petrovna
- Bryan Pringle as Police Sergeant
- Leonard Rossiter as Inspector Dudley
- Bill Fraser as bookseller
- David Horne as Duke of Windemere
- Charles Lloyd-Pack as butler
- Anne Blake as Nashka
- Ian Trigger as Popov's assistant

== Critical reception ==
The Monthly Film Bulletin wrote: "Unswervingly vulgar and soporific comedy whose principal joke is the sexual fatigue that overwhelms the hero in his patriotic attempts to keep his lady accomplices happy. The fantasy element is clumsily inserted (with great-grandfather's ghost looking remarkably like an extra from Ivan the Terrible (1944)), and N. F. Simpson's contribution to the script is discernible only in the accurately clichéd comments of the visitors to the Soviet exhibition and in the conversation of the elderly English Duke who boasts of having "slept through two World Wars". Mastroianni seems as embarrassed by his slapstick gags as Rita Tushingham does by the combination of Liverpudlian kookiness and romantic initiative with which the script burdens her; and only Warren Mitchell as the perspiring Russian (quoting Marx dogmatically, but still crossing himself for luck) strikes the right farcical note."
