= Like a Hole in the Head =

1970 novel by James Hadley Chase

- First edition (publ. Robert Hale)
- Author: James Hadley Chase
- Original title: Like a Hole in the Head
- Language: English
- Publisher: Robert Hale
- Publication date: 1970
- Publication place: UK

Like a Hole in the Head is a 1970 thriller love story novel by British writer James Hadley Chase.

== Plot summary ==
Ace marksman Jay Benson lives a retired life from the army with his beloved wife Lucy, and starts a school for training in firearm shooting. Unfortunately they fall short of money, when Augusto Savanto walks into their lives, promising Jay a huge sum of money in return for teaching his son Timoteo, who is totally uninterested in shooting. He wants his son to be able to shoot like an expert in just nine days. Benson agrees but soon realizes that he has entered a circle of revenge and murders involving mafias, in which he must participate, else it could affect both Lucy and him.

== Film ==
The 1992 Russian film Sniper (Russian: Снайпер), which was filmed at Brezhnev's former dacha Wisteria (Russian: «Глициния») built in 1955 as Gosdacha No. 1 (Russian: Госдача №1) in Nizhnyaya or Lower Oreanda (Russian: Нижняя Ореанда) on the southern coast of Crimea next to the Livadia Palace, is based upon Like a Hole in the Head. (Note: Hennadiy Moskal alleged that the first gas war between Kyiv and Moscol occurred in 2004 because Putin wanted Wisteria "as the official residence of the President of Russia in the Crimea", according to the Crimean prosecutor Viktor Shemchuk, but Kyiv did not want Putin to obtain the property through a loan from VTB and a 12 November 2004 contract for the purchase of Wisteria was voided after Viktor Yushchenko became president of Ukraine in the spring of 2005. Revealed in 2021, persons closely associated with Putin allegedly obtained control of Wisteria for Putin's use.)
