= Ed Wasser =

American actor (b. 1964)

- Born: March 26, 1964 (age 61); Roslyn Heights, New York, United States
- Years active: 1992–2017

Ed Wasser (born March 26, 1964) is an American actor, best known for his portrayal of Mr. Morden in Babylon 5.

== Biography ==
Wasser was born in Roslyn Heights, New York on March 26, 1964. He obtained a Bachelor of Fine Arts degree from the State University of New York, SUNY Purchase Conservatory. After college he started his own business called Ad Skates, Inc., while continuing acting classes at the Michael Howard Studios.

== Career ==
=== Acting ===
He is best known for his portrayal of Mr. Morden in 14 episodes of the US science fiction television series Babylon 5. He also appeared in the pilot telefilm of the series, but as a different character ("Guerra", part of the operations staff in the Babylon 5 Observation Dome).

Wasser has appeared in numerous television series including Quantum Leap, Law & Order, Murder, She Wrote, NYPD Blue, and 24.

He appears in the 1995 film The Set-Up.

=== Voicework ===
In 2009, he voiced a robot (IR-2) in the NASA animated short "Robot Astronomy Talk Show: Gravity and the Great Attractor," part of the web-series IRrelevant Astronomy produced by NASA's Spitzer Space Telescope.

=== Construction ===
Mainly retired from acting, Wasser founded a construction company called Waterstone Construction and works as a general contractor.

== Film ==
Film
Year	Title	Role	Notes
1995	The Set Up	Cop #1	
1995	Stormswept	Eugene	
1995	The Royal Affair		
1995	Star Witness		
1996	Dark Secrets	Dennis Gary	
1997	The Emissary: A Biblical Epic	Julius	
2000	Home the Horror Story	Kurt Tester	
2007	Eight Thirty Two	Mr. Black	(Short)
2008	The Better Angels	Charles Nichols	(Short)
2015	Weekend Delivery		(Short)
2015	Modulation	Dad	(Short)

== TV appearances ==
Television
Year	Title	Role	Notes
1986	Another World	Benjamin	Episode #1.5620
1992	Quantum Leap	Young Executive	Episode: "It's a Wonderful Leap - May 10, 1958"
1992	Murder, She Wrote	First Man	Episode: "The Mole"
1993	Babylon 5: The Gathering	Guerra	TV movie
1993	Eden		
1994	Hot Line	Marc	Episode: "Voyeur"
1995	NYPD Blue	Det. Ernie Kowalski	Episode: "Cold Heaters"
1996	Sliders	Studio Guard	Episode: "Dead Man Sliding"
1997	Mike Hammer, Private Eye	Howard Orrey	Episode: "False Truths"
1994-1998	Babylon 5	Morden	14 episodes
2004	24	Jason Carasone	Episode: "Day 3: 2:00 a.m.-3:00 a.m."
2008	IRrelevant Astronomy	Robot IR-2	
2010	Spaceship Spitzer: Bots of Both Worlds	Robot Ir-2 (voice)	(Short)
2009-2013	Robot Astronomy Talk Show	Robot Ir-2 / News Anchor / Robot IR-2	4 episodes
2017	The Universe Unplugged	Dave	Episode: "NOTGLaDOS: Electromagnetic Spectrum The Musical"
