= Cade (novel) =

1966 novel by James Hadley Chase

- Cover of the first edition, published by Robert Hale
- Author: James Hadley Chase
- Language: English
- Publisher: Robert Hale
- Publication date: 1966

Cade is a 1966 thriller novel by British writer James Hadley Chase.

== Plot summary ==
Cade was lucky. He was famous, wealthy, sought after, and his creative talent for photography set him in a class of his own. Success hadn't spoiled him. He remained generous and unselfish, a simple man with a brilliant talent, and a champion of the unfortunate and the persecuted.

But like most creative artists he had his failings: he was extravagant, he drank more than was good for him, and was over-fond of the company of beautiful women. For a long time he escaped the logic of these failings, until Juana Roco, the young Mexican girl, swept into his life. Cade thought she was the most beautiful thing he had ever seen.

Within a few months, Cade's luck had changed. Few people would have recognised the alcoholic wreck of a man left for dead on the streets of a town called Eastonville.
