= I'll Get You for This (novel) =

1946 novel by James Hadley Chase

Covet of the first edition, published by Jarrolds.

I'll Get You For This is a 1946 action thriller novel by British writer James Hadley Chase.

== Synopsis ==
Chester Cain, a small-time ex hit man and ace gambler, tired of his old life, moves to Paradise Palms, "some seventy miles from Miami", to start a new life with his lifetime savings, only to come across a set of ruthless people who try to use him and implicate him in a crime which he has not committed. Soon the cops are after Cain, who goes on the run, along with newfound Ms.Wonderly, a homeless wayward girl, who has also been framed like him. Cain is left with no choice but to use his skills to prove his innocence and get to the bottom of the situation.

This book is incredibly action-packed, despite the fact that Chase novels are typically thrillers and not just action novels.

== See also ==
I'll Get You for This, 1951 film of the book
