= The Soft Centre =

1964 novel by James Hadley Chase

- First edition
- Author: James Hadley Chase
- Cover artist: Barbara Walton
- Language: English
- Genre: Crime novel
- Publisher: Robert Hale, 1964
- Pages: 190
- ISBN: 978-0552096027

The Soft Centre is detective novel by British writer James Hadley Chase, first published in Great Britain by Robert Hale Ltd. in 1964. The novel in set in Chase's fictional city "Paradise City" and was the first work to introduce Detective Tom Lepski.

== Plot summary ==
Val Burnett's husband, Chris, has had a near-fatal head injury and has now been brought to the Spanish Bay Hotel, Paradise City, to lie in the sun-and-sands and recuperate. He is almost a zombie by now, although there is hope of recovery. One day he vanishes from the Spanish Bay Hotel, to be found the next day, roaming around in a disheveled state on the highway. The same day, a prostitute, Sue Parnell, is found ripped apart in a nearby motel room. So far no connection but a cigarette lighter presented to Chris by Val, is found at the scene of the crime.

The adventure begins with Valerie Burnett, the daughter of a multimillionaire, and her husband Chris in the Spanish Bay Hotel with advice to get some relaxation in the Miami sun especially after Chris had received brain injuries from a car accident. In a shabby second-rate motel on the outskirts of Florida an attractive blonde was found savagely murdered. On the same night Chris Burnett disappeared.

Police investigated but when the case proved too much for them, Joan Parnell, the sister of the dead woman, went to seek The Hare Investigating Agency to find her sister’s killer. They stumbled on enough evidence that turned them greedy.
