= Not Dumb, The Bird =

1972 film

- Directed by: Jean Delannoy
- Written by: Jean Delannoy; Daniel Boulanger
- Based on: Just a Matter of Time by James Hadley Chase
- Produced by: Gérard Ducaux-Rupp; Edmond Ténoudji
- Starring: Françoise Rosay; Anny Duperey; Bruno Pradal
- Cinematography: Christian Matras
- Edited by: Annie Charveina
- Music by: Michel Legrand
- Production companies: Fidès; Filmsonor; Les Films Marceau; Maran Film; West Film
- Distributed by: Cocinor
- Release date: 15 November 1972
- Running time: 96 minutes
- Countries: France; Italy; West Germany
- Language: French

Not Dumb, The Bird (French: Pas folle la guêpe) is a 1972 comedy crime film directed by Jean Delannoy and starring Françoise Rosay, Anny Duperey and Bruno Pradal. It was a co-production between France, Italy and West Germany and based on the novel Just a Matter of Time by British writer James Hadley Chase. The film's sets were designed by the art director René Renoux.

== Synopsis ==
An eccentric and fabulously wealthy old lady Morelli-Johnson is unaware of the schemes of various of her servant including her chauffeur and nurse Marthe as well as her disinherited nephew Alain, to fraudulently alter the terms of her will. However their complex schemes are less assured than they hope.

== Cast ==
- Françoise Rosay as Mme Morelli-Johnson
- Anny Duperey as Marthe
- Bruno Pradal as Alain Morelli
- Philippe Clay as Jack Bromfield
- Olivier Hussenot as Me Weidman
- Daniel Ceccaldi as Gérard Chardonnet
- Henri-Jacques Huet as L'inspecteur de police judiciaire
- Harald Leipnitz as Victor Masson
- Alexandre Rignault as l'homme à la jambe de bois
- Florence Brière as la bonne de Mme Morelli
- Gabrielle Doulcet as une amie de Mme Morelli, joueuse de cartes
- Madeleine Bouchez as une amie de Mme Morelli, joueuse de cartes
- Madeleine Clervanne as une amie de Mme Morelli, joueuse de cartes
- Gérard Dauzat as le vendeur de piano
- Corinne Lahaye as la secrétaire de Gérard Chardonnet
- Siegfried Rauch as l'ami de Jacques
- Janine Souchon as La dame de compagnie congédiée

== Bibliography ==
- Ford, Charles. Histoire du cinéma français contemporain, 1945-1977. Éditions France-Empire, 1977.
- Goble, Alan. The Complete Index to Literary Sources in Film. Walter de Gruyter, 1999.
- Rège, Philippe. Encyclopedia of French Film Directors, Volume 1. Scarecrow Press, 2009.
