= A Little Virtuous =

- Directed by: Serge Korber
- Written by: Michel Audiard; Serge Korber; Claude Sautet
- Based on: But a Short Time to Live by James Hadley Chase
- Produced by: Irénée Leriche; Robert Sussfeld
- Starring: Dany Carrel; Jacques Perrin; Robert Hossein
- Cinematography: Jean Rabier
- Edited by: Marie-Claire Korber
- Music by: Georges Delerue
- Production company: Gaumont International
- Distributed by: Gaumont Distribution
- Release date: 21 February 1968
- Running time: 105 minutes
- Country: France
- Language: French

A Little Virtuous (French: La petite vertu) is a 1968 French comedy crime film directed by Serge Korber and starring Dany Carrel, Jacques Perrin and Robert Hossein. It is based on the 1951 novel But a Short Time to Live by British writer James Hadley Chase, originally published under his pen name Raymond Marshall.

== Cast ==
- Dany Carrel as Claire Augagneur
- Jacques Perrin as Ferdinand / Freddy
- Robert Hossein as Louis Brady
- Pierre Brasseur as Jules Polnick
- Alfred Adam as Marcel dit 'Lajoie' - l'homme du bar
- Micheline Luccioni as Doris
- Roger Bontemps as Le type du bar
- Michel Creton as François
- Jean-Claude Massoulier as Hubert
- Odile Poisson as Martine
- Yvon Sarray as Le gérant de la brasserie
- Philippe Vallauris as Marcel - le barman de la brasserie
- Cécile Vassort as Janine
- Robert Dalban as Lorenzi
- Raymond Gérôme as Kerman

== Bibliography ==
- Philippe Rège. Encyclopedia of French Film Directors, Volume 1. Scarecrow Press, 2009.
