= Man in the Middle (film) =

1963 film by Guy Hamilton

- British quad poster
- Directed by: Guy Hamilton
- Screenplay by: Willis Hall; Keith Waterhouse
- Based on: The Winston Affair (1959 novel) by Howard Fast
- Produced by: Walter Seltzer
- Starring: Robert Mitchum; France Nuyen; Barry Sullivan
- Cinematography: Wilkie Cooper
- Edited by: John Bloom
- Music by: John Barry; Lionel Bart
- Production company: Talbot Productions
- Distributed by: 20th Century Fox
- Release date: 5 February 1964
- Running time: 94 minutes
- Countries: United Kingdom; United States
- Language: English
- Box office: $1,000,000 (US/ Canada)

Man in the Middle is a 1964 British-American CinemaScope war film, starring Robert Mitchum and directed by Guy Hamilton. The movie, set in World War II India, tells the story of the murder trial of an American Army officer who killed a British soldier. Mitchum plays Lieutenant Colonel Barney Adams, who has been assigned as the accused man's defence counsel. The film is also known as The Winston Affair, the title of the novel the film was based on, which was written by Howard Fast.

== Plot ==
Friction develops between American and British troops stationed in India during World War II and fights break out between the troops when, in 1944, American 2nd Lieutenant Winston shoots unarmed British Staff Sergeant Quinn several times, seemingly without provocation, in front of 11 witnesses. American General Kempton assigns Lieutenant Colonel Barney Adams to defend Winston at his court-martial because, even though everyone thinks it is an open-and-shut case, the general wants Adams to put up a vigorous defence. He is to make it clear that the verdict is not simply a sop to reduce tensions between the two armies before an offensive against the real enemy. Adams later finds out that Winston's brother-in-law, a Congressman, has been applying pressure.

The Army Lunacy Commission finds Winston fit and sane to stand trial; Adams is informed by nurse Kate Davray that Colonel Burton, who headed the commission, refused to accept the report (which he destroyed) of the hospital's psychiatric head, Major Kaufman, who believes Winston is a psychopath. Burton is anxious to have Winston convicted and hanged to patch the strained relations between the two forces. Adams instructs Kaufman to bring his report to the trial, but when Burton is informed of this order, he transfers Kaufman to a distant hospital. Adams visits British Major Kensington, a qualified psychiatrist who also considers Winston to be psychopathic but has been warned not to interfere. Kensington believes Winston killed Quinn out of a feeling of victimisation because Quinn, a sergeant, had the same duties as Winston, a lieutenant. During a brief love affair, nurse Kate Davray gives Colonel Adams an unsigned carbon copy of Major Kaufman's report, which at first, he refuses to accept.

Winston, in an interview with Adams, raves that he killed Quinn for defiling the white race by consorting with a black woman. Though he despises Winston, Adams refuses to rig the trial and he holds back his defence, waiting for Kaufman to arrive as a witness. When he learns that Kaufman has been killed in a jeep accident on the way to the trial, Adams calls Kensington to the stand, after establishing that no member of the lunacy commission is a qualified psychiatrist, to authenticate the unsigned carbon copy of Major Kaufman's report. As Kensington describes Winston's mental illness to the court, Winston cracks and begins raving. Adams wins his case and spends a few days of peace and happiness with nurse Davray before leaving the area. The friction between the troops is eased, and they prepare to enter battle in complete unity.

== Cast ==
- Robert Mitchum as Lieutenant Colonel Barney Adams
- France Nuyen as Kate Davray
- Barry Sullivan as General Kempton
- Trevor Howard as Major Kensington
- Keenan Wynn as Lieutenant Winston
- Sam Wanamaker as Major Kaufman
- Alexander Knox as Colonel Burton
- Gary Cockrell as Lieutenant Morse
- Robert Nichols as Lieutenant Bender
- Michael Goodliffe as Colonel Shaw
- Errol John as Sergeant Jackson
- Paul Maxwell as Major Smith
- Lionel Murton as Captain Gunther
- Russell Napier as Colonel Thompson
- Jared Allen as Captain Dwyer
- David Bauer as Colonel Mayburt
- Edward Underdown as Major Wyclif
- Howard Marion-Crawford as Major Poole
- Al Waxman as Corporal Zimmerman
- Terence Cooper as Major Clement
- Basdeo Panday as the Indian Correspondent

== Reception ==
According to Fox records, the film cost $2,800,000 to produce but only earned $1,735,000 in film rentals.
