= Consider Yourself Dead =

Novel by James Hadley Chase

Consider Yourself Dead is a 1978 kidnap drama thriller novel by British author James Hadley Chase.

First edition (publ. Robert Hale)

== Synopsis ==
Mike Frost is invited to apply for a lucrative security guard job in Las Vegas. Frost immediately takes up the job, with the least perception of the hazards he will have to encounter.

== Plot ==
Ex-cop and armyman Mike Frost, in and out of different jobs for long, is one day met by attractive Marcia Grace, and advised to apply for a lucrative security guard job in Paradise City Las Vegas offered by one of her best friends. A thrilled Frost flies immediately to Las Vegas with his miniature savings and meets with Marcia's friend, who tells him that he will have to guard Italian mafia Carlo Grandi's estate where his daughter Gina has been kept in solitary confinement by her father after a failed kidnap attempt in Italy. He immediately gets to work at the heavily guarded villa, with dogs and electric fences, where he is met with co-guard Jack Marvin, a difficult supervisor Amando and a Japanese cook Suka. Gina takes a liking for Frost and confides in him. Gina is weird, and actually dislikes her father for confining her and wants to escape from the villa.

Soon frost meets Marcia again in Vegas and spends time with her. She is revealed to be working for her uncle under duress in Last Vegas, Lu Silk, a professional hitman, and criminal. Silk is plotting to kidnap Gina for ransom, along with colleagues Ross Umney and Mitch Goble, and wanted someone to take up the security guard job in the villa and be an inside man for them. Marcia found Frost and convinced him to take up the job for this hidden reason. But ex-cop that he is, Frost is not naive or fooled, and he soon confronts the gang, who tell him that he has the choice to either agree to participate in the kidnapping for 5 million dollars, or to leave Las Vegas immediately since he now knows their intention, with a warning that Silk will kill him if he accepts the offer and then tries to back out or sell the gang out.

A greedy Frost takes up the offer, and the gang hatch a plan to carry out the kidnap. Silk obtains records of illegal transactions of Grandi in Italian banks that could land him in jail, and decide to blackmail him along with the kidnap of his daughter, thinking that he will simply pay up and take back his child for fear of going to jail. They decide to split the loot amongst themselves tactfully via documents they would force Grandi to sign, and Frost decides to leave for Switzerland thereafter. As part of plan, they decide to dope Marvin and Amando, neutralize the defences of the villa using Gina (after Frost convinces her to cooperate in her own kidnapping, promising her freedom from her father) and the gang would make away with a cooperative Gina, while Frost will play innocent back home and tactfully convince Grandi to pay up the ransom.

The gang manage to carry out the kidnap. Marvin falls for the trick, Suka runs away on hearing of the kidnap, and Amando gets a heart attack and is sent to hospital. But a rude shock sets in when Gina runs away in the city on her own after the kidnap, and it is revealed that Grandi in Italy knew about their plan all along, and that Suka is actually a Japanese electronics and security expert working for Grandi and was secretly watching the others in the villa by posing as a cook. Grandi confronts Frost in Las Vegas, threatening him and the gang with recordings of their conversations by Suka and dire consequences. He tells than that their attempts at blackmail will simply fail, for his contacts are too good in Italy in spite of their so-called evidence, and that they better return his child for a pardon.

A helpless Frost and the gang decide to find Gina. Frost eventually finds her in a reefer camp where she has been totally drugged with LSD, and has already committed homicide on a reefer who over-fed her the LSD. Frost then calls the gang and advises them to bury the reefer, and he takes Gina to hospital to meet Grandi. Silk thinks of blackmailing Grandi into paying ransom in return for not implicating Gina in the reefer's homicide. But Frost does not care anymore; he just leaves Gina with Grandi in hospital and quietly goes back to the villa. It is also revealed that Amando, who was actually a psychiatrist monitoring Gina in the Villa, has died in hospital of the heart attack.

Doctors declare Gina brain dead with no hope of recovery, and a distraught Grandi himself disconnects her ventilator support. Silk then approaches Grandi, and Grandi offers him two million dollars to kill Frost, as he believes it was Frost who set Gina free from the villa in the first place, leading to her ultimate demise.

Umney relays Grandi's intention to Frost, and tells him that Silk will eventually find and kill him. The undaunted Mike Frost decides to fight for life vehemently by killing the gang and returning to where he came from. He goes armed to the hotel where the gang is staying and begins a gunfight, hidden in the bushes outside, killing Umney and Goble. Unfortunately Frost gets shot by Silk from the terrace and dies. But Silk does not savour his victory for long, as on scene appears Suka, who has been given the task of following and eliminating everyone by Grandi; he knifes Silk and drops him down to his death from the terrace.

In the end, Grandi decides to go back to Italy with Suka for his daughter's funeral.

== Character list ==
- Mike Frost - Ex army man and Protagonist
- Marcia Grace - Silk's niece
- Carlo Grandi - Italian Mafia Don
- Gina Grandi - Carlo Grandi's daughter
- Marvin - Co guard
- Suka - Japanese cook/Martial arts and telecommunications expert
- Amando - Supervisor/Psychiatrist
- Lu Silk - Professional hitman and Marcia Grace's Uncle
- Ross Umney - Sidekick to Silk
- Mitch Goble - Sidekick to Silk
