= Eve (Chase novel) =

1945 novel by James Hadley Chase

- First edition
- Author: James Hadley Chase
- Language: English
- Genre: Psychological thriller
- Publisher: Jarrolds
- Publication date: 1945
- Publication place: Great Britain

Eve is a 1945 psychological thriller novel by British writer James Hadley Chase. Set against the background of the Hollywood film industry, the story revolves around Clive Thurston, who has swindled his way to fame, and Eve, a femme fatale who is beautiful to look at but lethal to love.

The novel has been adapted to film twice under the title Eva, once in 1962 by director Joseph Losey, and again in 2018 by Benoît Jacquot.

== Plot ==
When ailing writer John Coulson dies without publishing the play he wrote, his acquaintance, shipping clerk Clive Thurston, decides to falsely claim the play as his own, and publishes it under his own name. The play's success leads to Clive becoming a wealthy celebrity script writer in Hollywood, with women at his beck and call. One stormy night, Clive visits his vacation home only to find two strangers trespassing: a man named Barrow and his companion, the glamorous Eve Marlow. Clive learns that Eve is a prostitute and Barrow is her client, who brought her to the unoccupied house for a tryst. Clive beats Barrow and throws him out of the house, and then tries to seduce Eve himself, but she knocks him unconscious, and disappears.

Following this encounter, Clive decides to find Eve and win her over, despite being in a relationship with Carol, a pretty screenwriter who wants to marry him. His butler Russell warns Clive against Eve and advises him to marry Carol instead. Nevertheless, Clive finds Eve's house and takes her out. Eve openly tells him she is not interested in him and that she meets men for money but only has loyalty towards her husband, Jack, who is always away on business. Unconvinced, Clive continues to pursue Eve, paying for her services. Eve coldly plays around with Clive while continuing to see Barrow and other men.

Carol introduces Clive to prominent personalities in Hollywood, including director Gold who offers Clive a huge sum for a new script. Clive tries to write a script based on the personality of Eve, but is falling into debt as royalties of his one hit play start to decline. Being unskilled as a writer, he is unable to come up with a new novel or play, to the dismay of his publishers. Carol and his other acquaintances learn about his affair with Eve, and Clive briefly breaks up with Carol, then has second thoughts and abandons Eve, realizing that she doesn't care about him. Clive apologizes to Carol and promises to marry her. Gold, who also wanted to marry Carol, warns Clive that he better avoid Eve and not hurt Carol, and further hints that he believes Clive's hit play is not Clive's own work.

Clive and Carol are married, but soon he begins to long for Eve again. One day Eve telephones, cursing Clive for abandoning her and saying she mailed back all the money he paid for her services. When Carol goes away on a business trip, Clive secretly meets Eve again, but finds she has not changed, and that she lied about sending back his money. He later meets a redheaded prostitute who knows Eve, and takes the redhead home in order to learn more about Eve from her. The redhead tells him that Eve suffered an abusive childhood which caused her to become cold and cruel herself, and that she has no husband and just uses men for fun and money. Carol arrives home and sees Clive with the redhead. Shocked, she speeds off recklessly in her car, which crashes aloft a valley and she dies.

Clive's Hollywood career ends thereafter; Gold gets evidence that Clive's play was not his own work, and Clive is forced to return all the royalties. A distraught Clive decides to kill Eve in revenge for all his misfortune. He sneaks into her house and attacks her, only to be beaten and thrown out by Eve and Barrow, just as Clive had earlier thrown Barrow out. Russell finds Clive and takes him home.

Two years later, Clive is working with Russell at a shipping site, and has not seen Eve since the confrontation at her home. He writes a book about his past with Eve, in hopes she will read it and see how much he actually knew about her. Russell purchases a ferry with his savings, which he names Carol, and makes Clive his partner for ferrying tourists across the harbour.

== Plagiarism ==
Part of its seventeenth chapter is plagiarized from the ninth chapter of Appointment in Samarra by John O'Hara.

== Film adaptations ==
- Eva — A 1962 film directed by Joseph Losey, starring Jeanne Moreau and Stanley Baker.
- Eva — A 2018 film directed by Benoît Jacquot, starring Isabelle Huppert and Gaspard Ulliel.

== In popular culture ==
- The book plays a central role in the meeting of the protagonists in the 1977 Indian Hindi film Apnapan.
