= My Laugh Comes Last =

1977 novel by James Hadley Chase

- First edition (publ. Robert Hale
- Author: James Hadley Chase
- Language: English
- Publication date: 1977

My Laugh Comes Last is a 1977 thriller novel by British writer James Hadley Chase.

== Plot summary ==
Larry Lucas is a small-time worker, who is one day approached by a millionaire, Farell Brannigan, to assist him and start a new bank in town, which should be the safest in the world. Thrilled by the offer, Larry jumps for it, starts minting money and enters high class circles, only to come across a series of problems on the way, involving deception, hypocrisy, treachery, murder, blackmail. The rest of the story is about how and whether Larry is able to deal with and survive it all.
