= World in My Pocket =

1961 film by Alvin Rakoff

- Original theatrical poster
- Directed by: Alvin Rakoff
- Written by: Frank Harvey
- Story by: Based on the novel The World in My Pocket by James Hadley Chase
- Produced by: Alexander Grüter; Artur Brauner
- Starring: Nadja Tiller; Rod Steiger; Peter van Eyck
- Cinematography: Václav Vích
- Edited by: Edward B. Jarvis; Alice Ludwig
- Music by: Claude Bolling
- Production companies: CCC Film; Corona Filmproduktion; Criterion Productions; Erredi Film; Panda Film
- Distributed by: Gaumont Distribution (France); British Lion Film Corporation (United Kingdom); Constantin Film (West Germany)
- Release date: 16 February 1961 (West Germany)
- Running time: 93 minutes
- Countries: France; Italy; United Kingdom; West Germany
- Languages: German; Italian; French

World in My Pocket (also known as On Friday at Eleven) is a 1961 European crime-drama film directed by Alvin Rakoff. The film was a co-production between West Germany (where it was released as An einem Freitag um halb zwölf), France (where is known as Vendredi 13 heures) and Italy (where is known as Il mondo nella mia tasca).

It was shot at the Spandau Studios and on location in Marseille. The film's sets were designed by the art directors Hans Kuhnert and Wilhelm Vorwerg. It is based on the 1959 novel The World in My Pocket by James Hadley Chase.

== Plot ==
A group of criminals plans to rob an armoured payroll truck for 5 million dollars. What seems as a perfectly planned heist turn out to have dangerous and unsuspected consequences.

== Cast ==
- Nadja Tiller as Ginny
- Peter van Eyck as Bleck
- Rod Steiger as Frank Morgan
- Jean Servais as Gypo
- Ian Bannen as Kitson
- Marisa Merlini as Frau Mandini
- Memmo Carotenuto as Herr Mandini
- Edoardo Nevola as Carlo Mandini
- Carlo Giustini as Pierre

== Bibliography ==
- Goble, Alan. The Complete Index to Literary Sources in Film. Walter de Gruyter, 1999.
