= Get a Load of This (short story collection) =

1942 book by James Hadley Chase

- Book Cover
- Author: James Hadley Chase
- Language: English
- Publication date: 1942
- Publication place: UK
- ISBN: 978-1-59654-818-3

Get a Load of This is a 1942 book by British writer James Hadley Chase. Unlike most of his other books, it is not a single story throughout, but a collection of 14 different short stories. The stories are not inter related, and most have twisted endings.

The book was written by Chase while he was still in the Royal Air Force and was first published in early autumn 1941, and subsequently reprinted in 1988. Initially Chase's publisher was not in favour of him writing short stories, but he wrote a letter to them with the script, and the book was accepted.

== Contents ==
- "Get a Load of This"
- "Two Thumb a Ride"
- "Morning Visit"
- "Twist in the Tale"
- "Conversation Piece"
- "The General Dies in Bed"
- "The Magnificent Opportunity"
- "Walk in the Park"
- "The Place of Love"
- "Vigil"
- "Night Out"
- "Skin Deep"
- "Overheard"
- "The Painted Angel"

== Plot summaries ==
=== "Get a Load of This" ===
A society columnist witnesses the murder of an entertainment biz manager by one of the latter's models at a show in a restaurant, and follows up the events that result.

=== "Two Thumb a Ride" ===
On his way to Miami, Denny Merlin comes across two stranger women, who hitch a ride on his Lincoln.

=== "Morning Visit" ===
An army searching for A.B.C. terrorists attack a Cuban farmer and his wife on the pretext of searching for guns being hidden at his house.

=== "Twist in the Tale" ===
George Hemingway, Ace car racer and millionaire, is visited by his friend Arden, who realizes that even though George is at the top and going to marry a rich and glamorous lady, he is not happy. Arden soon realizes that things are not the way they appear.

=== "Conversation Piece" ===
Harry Garner keeps an affair with a young lady, despite being married and having a daughter as old as her. Suddenly he is not willing to carry on with it anymore.

=== "The General Dies in Bed" ===
Cuba is under autocratic rule, and the rebels have paid a young boy to assassinate the War department General. After doing that, the boy is on the run.

=== "The Magnificent Opportunity" ===
General Holtz is selected to bring a useless gun back from the war torn mountains, for the sake of Mexican General Cortez, as the latter feels it is the only sign of victory in war against General Pablo.

=== "Walk in the Park" ===
A poor girl is teased and molested by two vagabonds in an empty park.

=== "The Place of Love" ===
On her way to Havana, a young lady is met with handsome Lacey on the ship, who simply uses her and abandons her in the city torn by civil war. She soon meets George Quentin, foreign correspondent of the New York Post, journalist Bill Morecombe and few others who together try to escape the war torn land.

=== "Vigil" ===
George and Alfy wait in desperation in the hospital as George's wife Margie is about to deliver a child that is not his, but presumed to be Alfy's.

=== "Night Out" ===
Bachelor Jason meets an attractive lady at the Gaucho club, and spends the rest of the evening with her, but on the pretext of spending time with him too, perhaps this lady is just using him.

=== "Skin Deep" ===
Hernie, a small-time offender, forcefully hitches a ride to Jefferson City in an ambulance carrying an attractive but mentally deranged young lady. Despite the driver's warning, he goes close to her.

=== "Overheard" ===
A barman at a pub overhears the conversation of a couple and understands that they have come there to meet for the last time and break up.

=== "Painted Angel" ===
Young Slug Moynihan, small-time boxer, falls for beautiful Rose working as a manicurist at a salon, and decides to date her using all his savings, hoping that she too will like him, not knowing about her dark secrets.
