= Francesca Tu =

Chinese-German actress (born 1943)

- Born: Shiu-Yung; November 3, 1943 (age 82); Wenzhou, Republic of China
- Occupation: Actress
- Years active: 1965-

Francisca "Francesca" Tu (born 1943) is a Chinese-born German film and television actress.

== Career ==
Francisca Tu took ballet lessons at the Hanover Opera House and trained at the Hanover University of Music, Drama and Media. At the age of 19, she went to London where she stayed with a cousin and assisted him in an auction house. During this time, Francisca learned a lot about Chinese art and also worked as a model for an advertising agency. She continued her artistic education at the London Academy of Music and Dramatic Art. On her 21st birthday, Francisca auditioned for the BBC and was immediately a job in a TV drama.

Shortly thereafter, roles followed in Jürgen Roland's Hong Kong thriller Lotus Blossoms and a small role of Mr. Osato's secretary alongside Sean Connery in the James Bond movie You Only Live Twice and as Lotus, the personal secretary of Denis Nayland Smith, the main opponent of the Chinese master criminal Dr. Fu Manchu (Christopher Lee).

In the second half of the 1960s, she had minor roles alongside Jerry Lewis in The Spinner, Marcello Mastroianni in Diamonds for Breakfast, Gregory Peck in The Most Dangerous Man in the World, and Peter Lawford and Sammy Davis Jr. in Salt and Pepper. In later film roles she co-starred with Gene Hackman, Oliver Reed and Candice Bergen and regular television commitments in popular multi-part or series like Death is Behind and The Offender on the Track.

== Selected filmography ==
=== Film ===
- The Face of Fu Manchu (1965)
- The Brides of Fu Manchu (1966)
- You Only Live Twice (1967)
- Lotus Flowers for Miss Quon (1967)
- Diamonds for Breakfast (1968)
- Don't Raise the Bridge, Lower the River (1968)
- The Blood of Fu Manchu (1968)
- Salt and Pepper (1968)
- The Chairman (1969)
- Liebling, sei nicht albern! (1970)
- Welcome to the Club (1971)
- The Hunting Party (1971)

=== Television ===
- Danger Man (1965, 1 episode)
- Take a Pair of Private Eyes (1966, 1 episode)
- Callan (1967) (A Magnum for Schneider)
- Hugh and I Spy (1968, 1 episode)
- Department S (1969, 1 episode)
- The Troubleshooters (1969, 1 episode)
- Jason King (1972, 1 episode)
- Tatort (1973, 1 episode)

== Bibliography ==
- Peter Shelley. Gene Hackman: The Life and Work. McFarland, 2018.
