= Bruno Pradal =

French actor (1949–1992)

- Born: 17 July 1949; Rabat, Morocco
- Died: 19 May 1992 (aged 42); Saran, Loiret, France
- Occupation: Actor
- Years active: 1969–1992
- Children: 1

Bruno Pradal (17 July 1949 – 19 May 1992) was a French actor.

== Filmography ==
Year	Title	Role	Notes
1969	La maison de campagne	Un invité	Uncredited
1971	To Die of Love	Gérard Leguen	
1971	La saignée	Thomas Chanard	
1971	A cuore freddo	Mirko, il pittore	
1971	Hellé	Julien Fournier	
1972	Not Dumb, The Bird	Alain Morelli	
1973	Quelques messieurs trop tranquilles	Paul	
1973	Les anges	Jean-Paul, alias Larry	
1976	L'arriviste	Le frère d'Alicia	
1977	Une fille cousue de fil blanc	Alain	
1980	Eclipse sur un ancien chemin vers Compostelle		
1980	Charlie Bravo	Lt. Brissac	
1985	November Moon	Marcel	
1986	Rue du Départ	The widower	
1987	La rumba	Teddy Malakian	
1988	Adieu je t'aime	Marc	
1988	Sortis de route	Le Père	
1989	Sans défense	Raynald	
