= The World in My Pocket (novel) =

1959 book by James Hadley Chase

- First edition
- Author: James Hadley Chase
- Language: English
- Genre: Thriller
- Publisher: Robert Hale
- Publication date: 1959
- Publication place: United Kingdom
- Media type: Print

The World in My Pocket is a 1959 thriller novel by the British writer James Hadley Chase.

== Film adaptation ==
In 1961 it was adapted into the French-German film World in My Pocket directed by Alvin Rakoff.

The novel was adapted into a three-episode Soviet Latvian television film titled MIrāža (Mirage), directed by Aloizs Brenčs, in 1983.

== Bibliography ==
- Goble, Alan. The Complete Index to Literary Sources in Film. Walter de Gruyter, 1999.
