= Tim Pyle =

American film director

- Born: 23 October 1969 (age 55)

Tim Pyle (born 23 October 1969) is an American filmmaker and animator based in Southern California.

Pyle's credits include Nickelodeon's Invader Zim series and SyFy Channel's Children of Dune miniseries, for which he won an Emmy certificate in 2003.

Pyle has worked at Caltech/IPAC since 2004 developing artwork and animation for NASA missions. These include the Spitzer Space Telescope, the Kepler Space Telescope, and the Jet Propulsion Lab's exoplanet division. He writes, directs, produces, animates, and composes music for the educational NASA webseries IRrelevant (IR-relevant) Astronomy.
