= Forbidden City (nightclub) =

Asian-themed cabaret in San Francisco, California

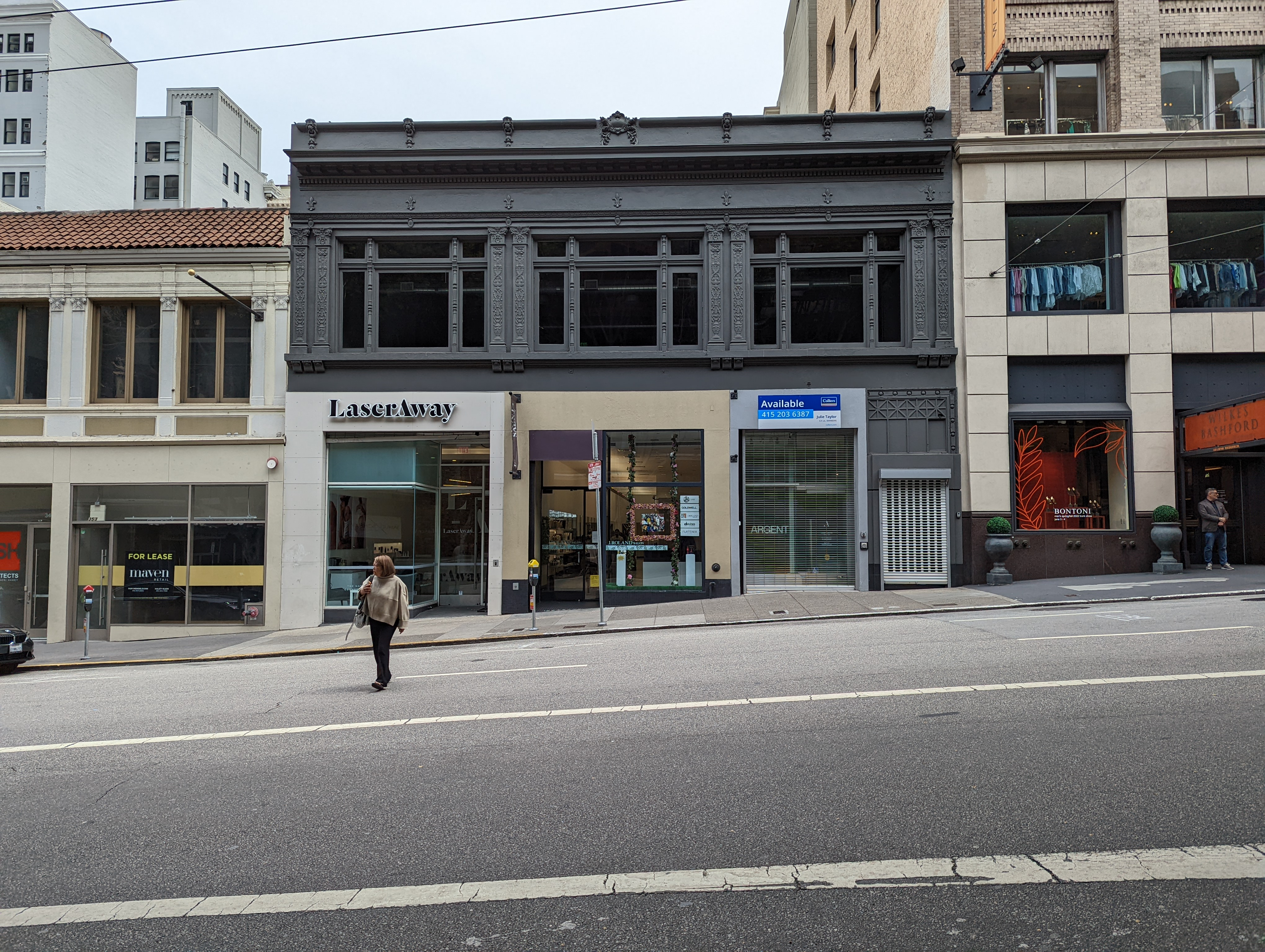
- The former space of the Forbidden City nightclub is the upstairs area (painted dark grey).

- Location within San Francisco Location within San Francisco Bay Area
- Full name: Charlie Low's Forbidden City
- Address: 363 Sutter St; San Francisco
- Coordinates: 37.7893°N 122.4063°W
- Owner: Charlie Low (1938–62); Coby Yee (1962–70)
- Capacity: 300
- Events: nightclub and cabaret featuring Asian American performers

Construction
- Opened: 22 December 1938
- Closed: 1970

Forbidden City was a nightclub and cabaret in San Francisco, which was in business from 1938 to 1970, and operated on the second floor of 363 Sutter Street, (Note: The former space has since been renumbered to 369 Sutter; after the Forbidden City closed, it operated as the Sutter Cinema (1970–1984) and later was used as a franchise of Barbizon Modeling and Acting School.) between Chinatown and Union Square.

Although Forbidden City was not the first Chinese American nightclub, it was the most famous nightlife venue to feature Asian American singers, dancers, chorus lines, magicians, strippers, and musicians, and was entirely managed and staffed by Asian Americans. It was popular with military personnel who were transiting through San Francisco during World War II, as well as Hollywood celebrities, and became the most well-known "Chop Suey Circuit" nightclub during the 40s and 50s. (Note: The term "Chop Suey Circuit" refers to the network of Chinese-American nightclubs which were open from the 1930s to the 1970s in San Francisco's Chinatown; the clubs competed for patrons and performers, who sometimes changed venues. San Francisco Chinatown nightclubs which competed with Forbidden City included: Chinese Palace; Andy Wong's Chinese Sky Room (465 Grant, at Pine); Club Mandalay; Fong Wan's Club Shanghai (453 Grant); The Dragon's Lair (521 Grant); Eddie Pond's Kubla Khan Theater Restaurant (1944 to 1950, 414 Grant); Li Po Lounge (916 Grant); The Lion's Den (950 Grant / 57 Wentworth); Shanghai Lil (1020 Kearny); D.W. Low's Shanghai Low (523 Grant)) (Note: Elsewhere in the San Francisco Bay Area, Fong Wan (AKA: Fong Poy), a famed multimillionaire herbalist, opened competing venues: New Shanghai Terrace Bowl (421 10th, Oakland) the career start for George Wright (organist); Club Oakland (Oakland); Nanking Café (Oakland); Chinese Cellar (SF); Club Shanghai (453 Grant, SF); Fong Wan feuded with Charlie Low in the mid-1940s by erecting a huge neon sign on an empty six-story building at 334 Sutter, across from Forbidden City, redirecting would-be patrons to his club, Club Shanghai, around the corner, at 453 Grant. In 1949, Fong Wan sued Low for $50,000 for "stealing" an acrobat from one of his clubs. The lawsuit was covered by the San Francisco Chronicle.)

Forbidden City also became a platform for Asian American performers who were denied opportunities through racial discrimination. Asian American performers were able to prove their talent regardless of their racial identity, and some even launched their career after the closure of Forbidden City.

In 1946, the club inspired Tom Ball, a Caucasian stage producer, to open the short-lived "China Doll" nightclub, the first with Asian American staff and performers in New York City. (Note: "China Doll" was at 51st and Broadway, occupying the space formerly used by the nightclub "La Conga". It was billed as "New York's only all-oriental night club"; one of its shows was titled Slant-Eyed Scandals.)

Forbidden City inspired the novel The Flower Drum Song (1957), which became a musical (1958) and film (1961) of the same title. In 1989, the club was profiled in the documentary, Forbidden City U.S.A., by Arthur Dong.

== History ==
=== Background ===
In 1913, Dai Wah Low's (Note: D.W. Low was a Chinatown entrepreneur and restaurateur whose businesses included the Shanghai Low (532 Grant) and Club Shanghai (453 Grant) restaurants.) Shanghai Low (532 Grant) opened, later expanded, and in 1923, was surpassed by Low's purpose-built New Shanghai Café (453 Grant), an early Chinese restaurant-nightclub with hardwood floors and room for a dance orchestra.

Low's Forbidden City was also preceded by, and competed with, Andy Wong's Chinese Sky Room, which opened almost a year earlier on December 31, 1937. The Chinese Sky Room featured a big band led by trumpeter Wong in what was previously the rooftop Chinese Tea Garden of the Grand View Hotel at 465 Grant (and Pine).

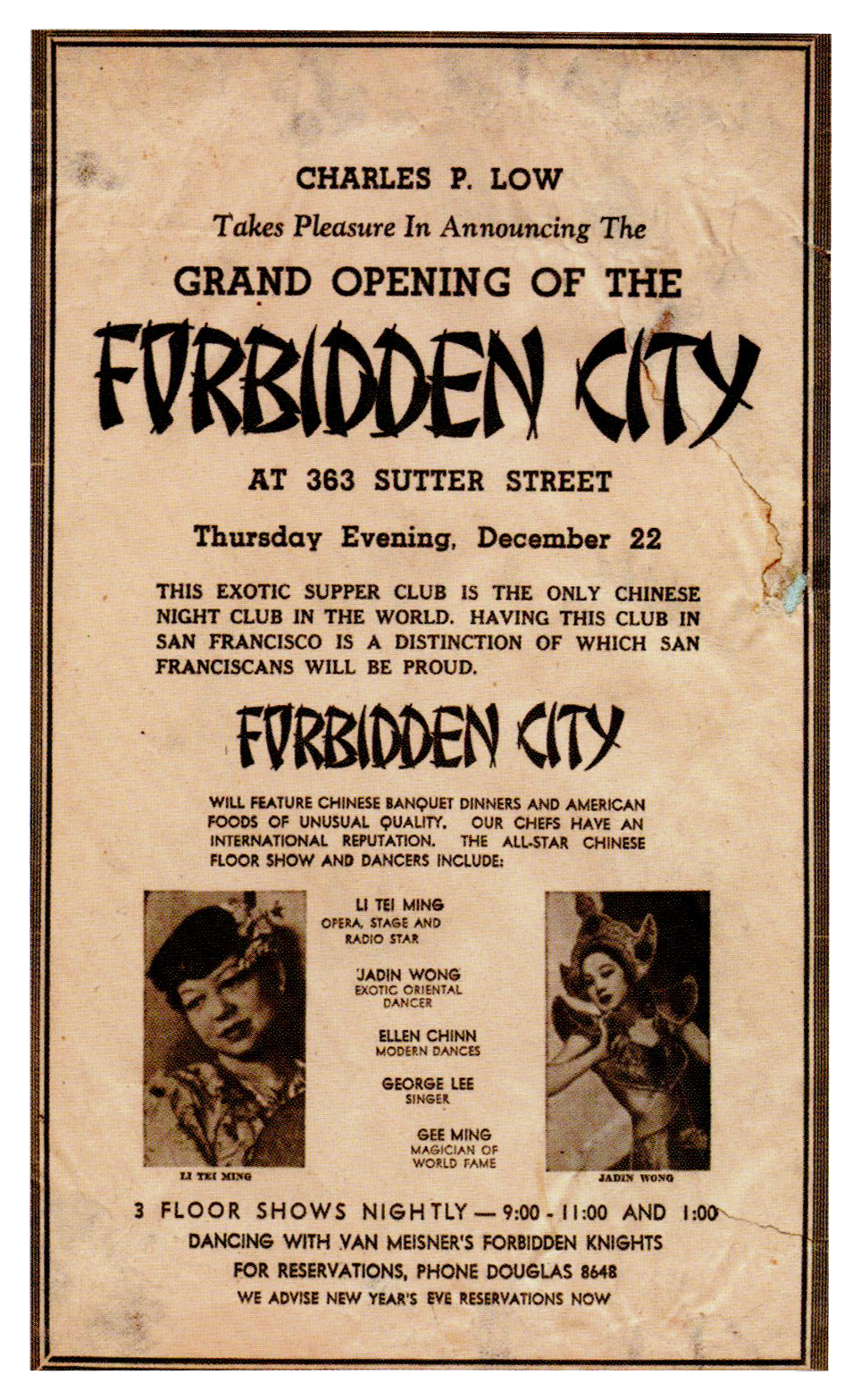
An ad from 1938 announces Forbidden City's opening.

=== Inception ===
Charlie Low, the son of small store owners from Nevada, opened the Forbidden City on December 22, 1938, after the success of Chinese Village (702 Grant), which he had opened two years earlier. Forbidden City introduced a Chinese-American bar and dinner floorshow. The new club would eventually become the most famous of approximately 12 Chinese-themed cabaret clubs in the Chinatown area. It was located a few blocks from San Francisco's Chinatown, and catered to the curiosity of a mostly white audience who were unfamiliar with and possibly intimidated by, a community of only Chinese Americans.

=== The origin of the name ===
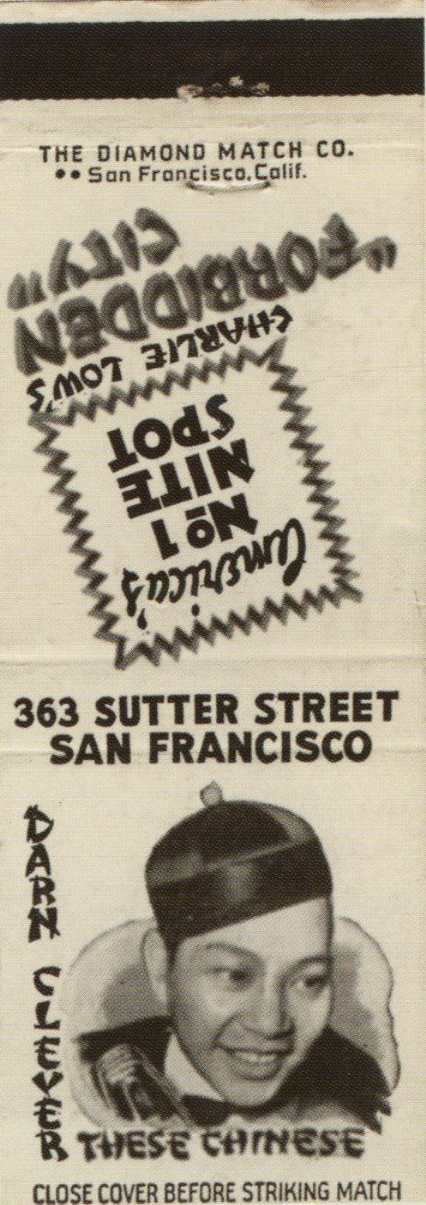
Forbidden City Matchbook Cover

Named after the Forbidden City in Beijing, Low described his nightclub as an Oriental paradise separated from the rest of the world. Low also joked about the club publicly, saying: "my babies (showgirls) are forbidden to say 'yes'", which resonates to his idea of "look—but don't touch my beautiful Oriental girls." The male performers were also labeled as "sissy," meaning homosexual men who don't fit into traditional gender roles of Chinese culture.

Forbidden City also was a forbidden destination for the local Chinese communities, especially for conservative Chinese residents. It was viewed as a scandalous and shameful place where "girls show their legs" when they are not taught to do so. Thus, Low found it difficult to recruit performers from the local Chinese community, which looked down on entertainers, particularly women in sexually provocative performances. For this reason, Low recruited Asian American performers primarily from other areas like Arizona, Hawaii, and the Midwest, rather than directly from San Francisco's Chinatown. Although the Forbidden City cast was drawn from multiple countries, Low required the performers to change their names to sound more "Chinese" because Forbidden City is a club that "celebrates Orientalism." Forbidden City also became a place for many of its cast to learn choreography formally as many of them were self-taught, or had no prior experience.

=== Rise to popularity ===
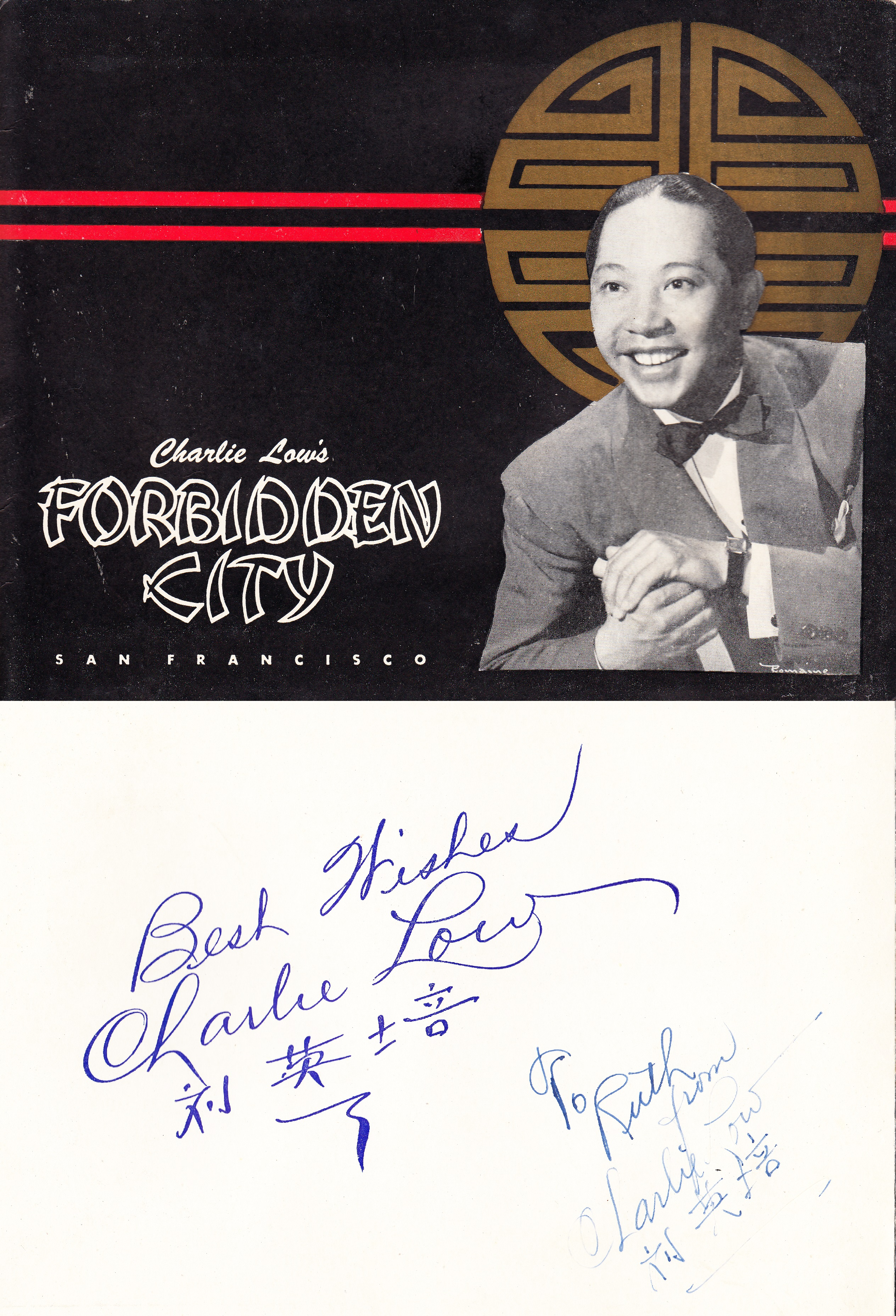
Owner Charlie Low, featured on a photo folder

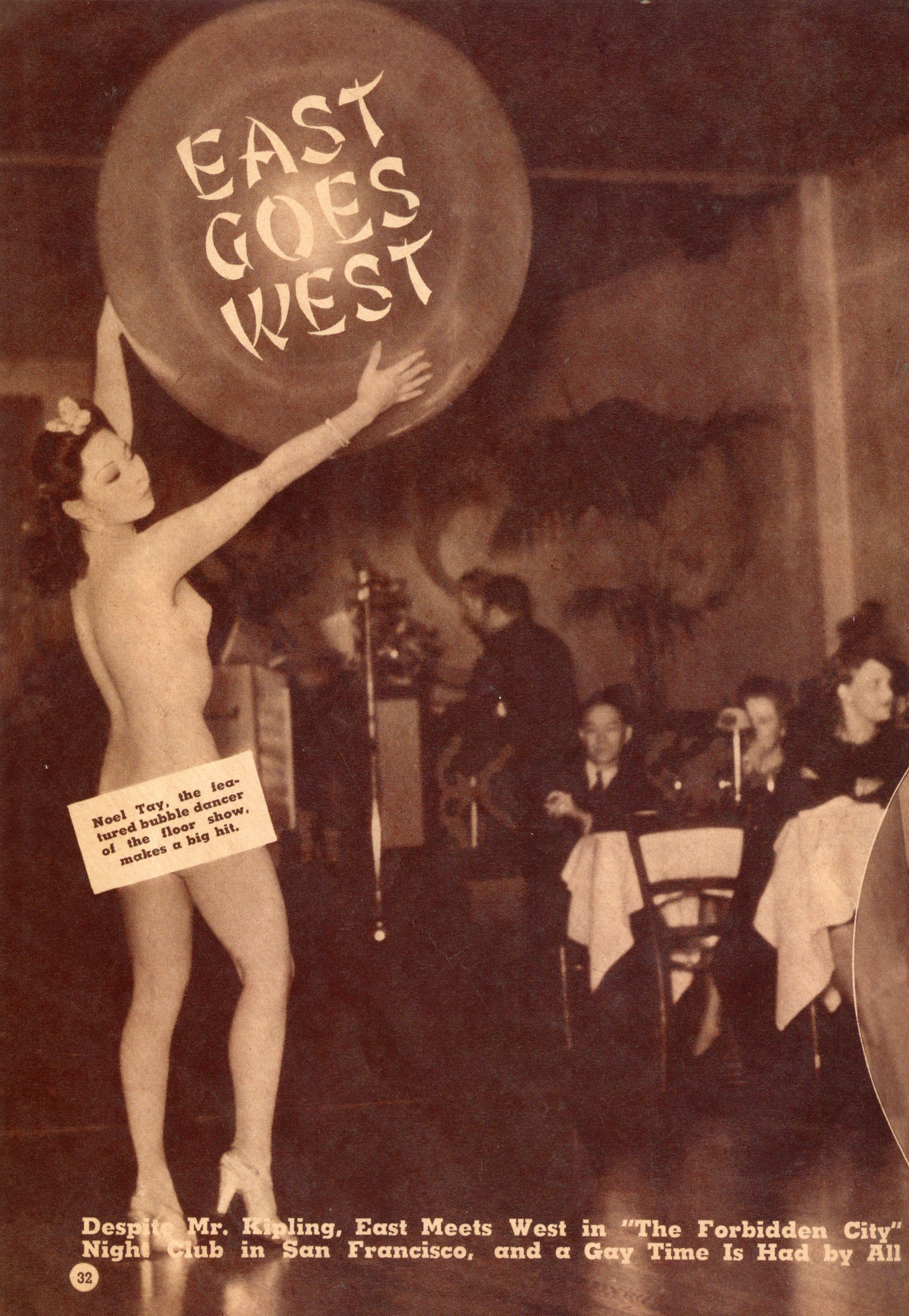
Noel Toy's famous bubble dance that sparked Forbidden City's popularity

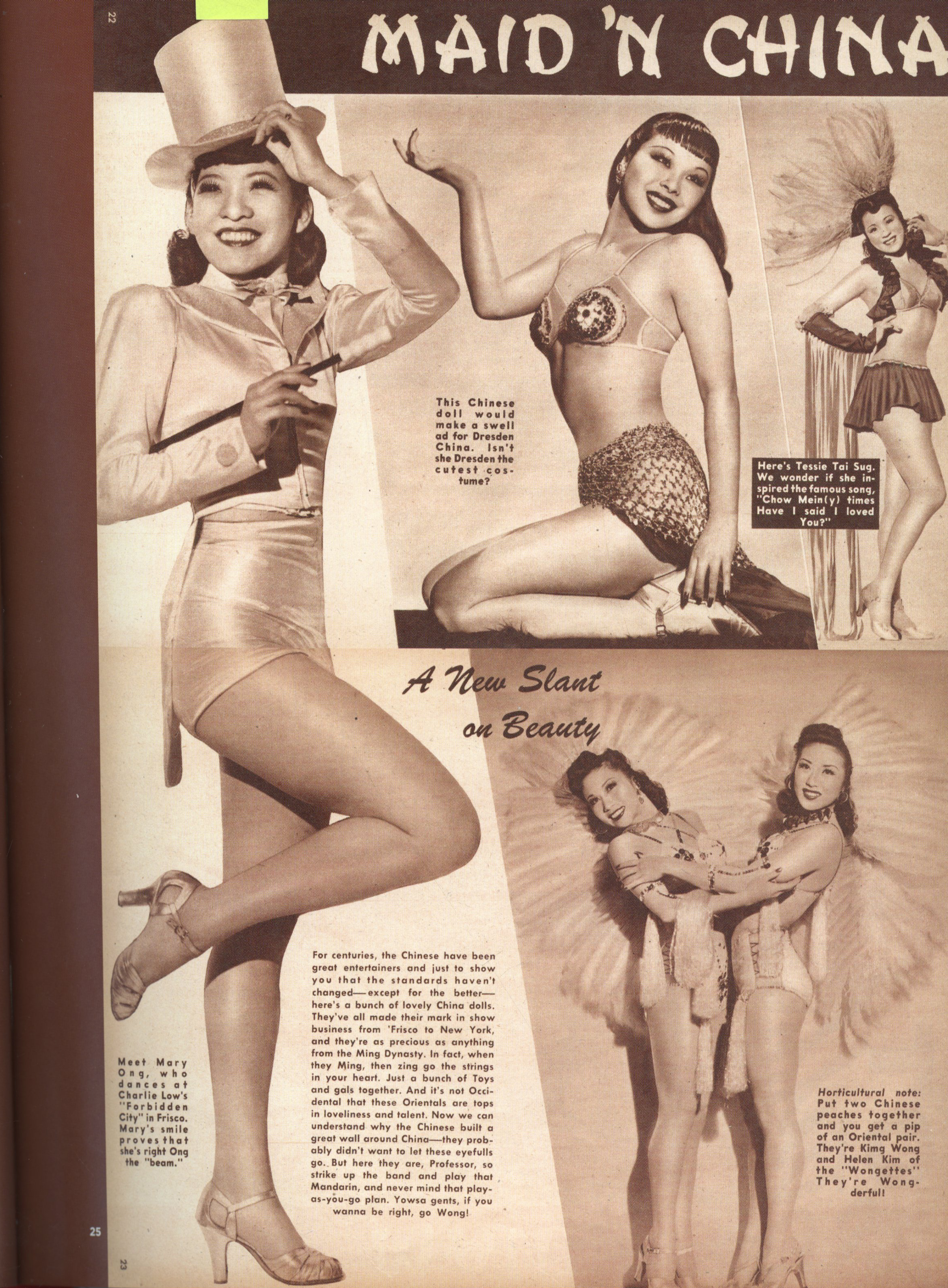
Five dancers from Forbidden City, featured in Beauty Parade magazine (1943)

Business was slow until 1940, when Low hired Noel Toy, a journalism student at University of California, Berkeley who had worked as a nude model at the Golden Gate International Exposition in 1939. At Forbidden City, Toy was marketed as a "Bubble Dancer" and the "Chinese Sally Rand" even though she had no experience in dancing. Toy performed nude with a large, opaque bubble covering her body. She also performed a nude fan dance with ostrich feathers. Within three months, business revenues had tripled. Life Magazine published a 3-page profile of the club in 1940, praising the dancing abilities of Chinese women as a "fragile charm distinctive to their race". Toy's performance also brought in a flow of male Caucasian audience who were seeking to fulfill their hypersexualization of race. According to the manager of Forbidden City, Frank Huie, during its busiest periods, the club recorded 2,200 patrons in a day.

Many of the performers were second and third-generation Asian Americans, who had grown up in traditional Chinese, Japanese, and Filipino immigrant households. The women, in particular, were expected to follow traditional female roles, and their grandmothers may have had bound feet. However, they strongly identified with American youth culture, including the film, music, and dance styles of the era. Some ran away from home to pursue a new life, such as Jadin Wong and Ellen Chinn. The Hollywood star Anna May Wong served as an inspiration to some of them, and they often rebelled against the conventions of their period. As Candice Pociano, daughter of Ellen Chin explained, "It was taboo to dance in Mom's day onstage exposing your legs, and even in my teen days, the Chinese girls were shy and demure." Furthermore, as explained by Jimmy Borges, a former performer at the club:

[Before] the Asian was always looked upon as being a menial. And when Charlie Low's nightclub opened, he showed that, you know, the Asians don't only do dishes or work on the railroads or do laundry. They dance, they sing, they're magicians, they're tap dancers. And not only that, they're very good at it... And whenever I ran into stuff where people I would run into, racism or stuff like that, all it did was make me stronger. I says, 'You know what? You're going to be sorry one day, you're going to wish you were my friend.' Because that was my impetus to succeed.

Forbidden City postcards
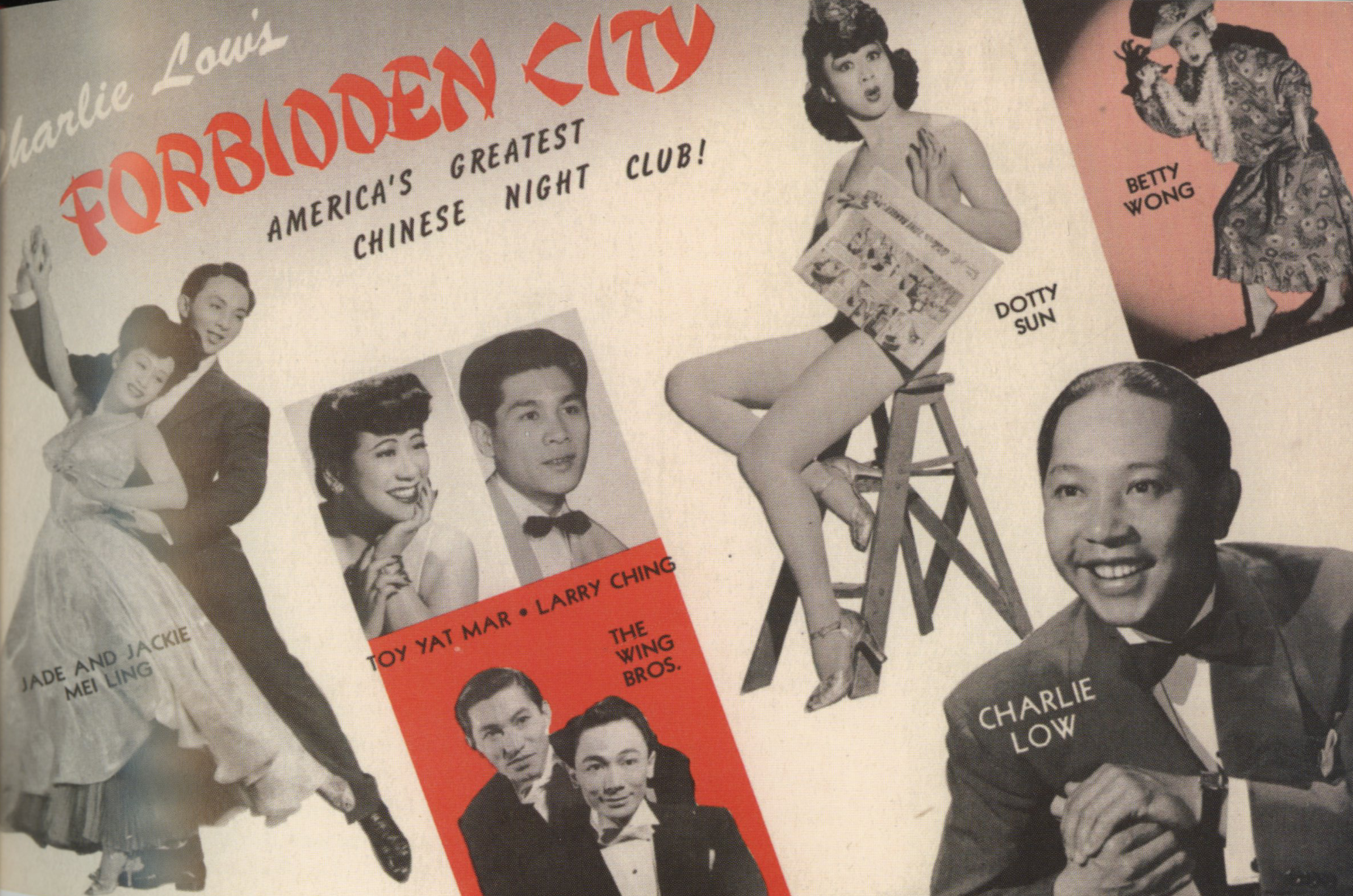
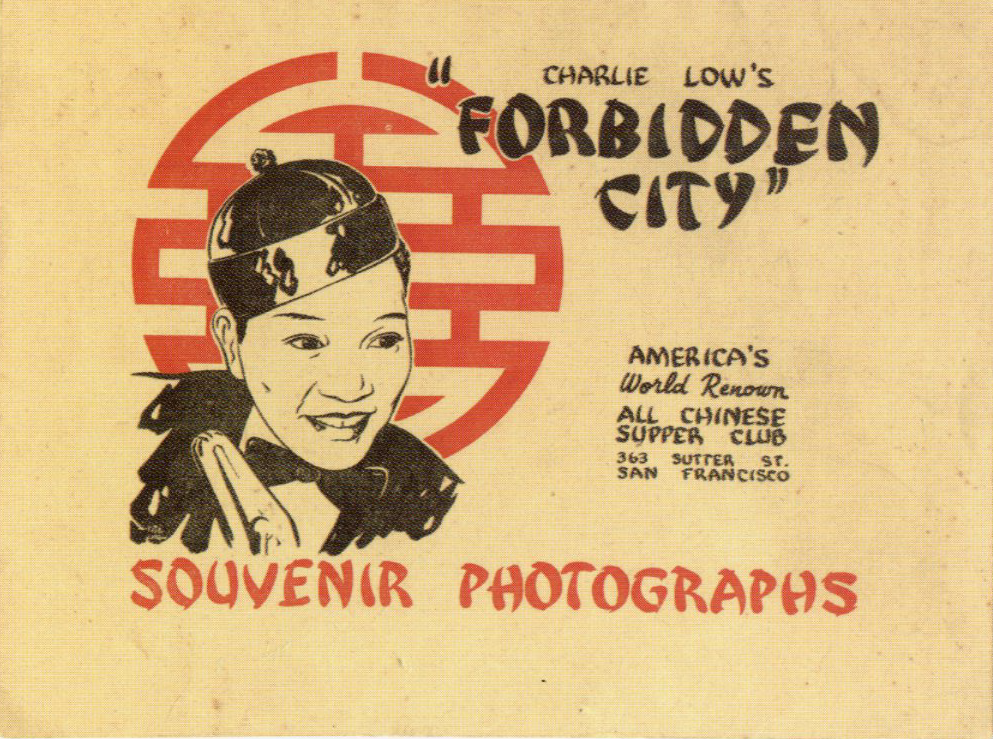

The club thrived through the 1950s. World War II brought many servicemen to San Francisco, which served as a primary port of departure for the Pacific Theater; the club was popular with both servicemen and tourists. The audience was primarily Caucasian, but Asian American locals and tourists also visited the club. Some of the Japanese American performers changed their names to avoid the prevalent anti-Japanese sentiment while others were forced to move out of the region to avoid internment. A fire in 1946 temporarily closed the club.

The club inspired the novel Flower Drum Song as well as its subsequent musical and film adaptations. In 1957 author C. Y. Yee wrote the best-selling novel, which was set at the Forbidden City. Rodgers and Hammerstein created a popular musical from the book in 1958; since then, it has had several revivals, the most recent by David Henry Hwang in 2001–02. Jack Soo (the stage name of Goro Suzuki) had been hired to headline the Forbidden City for a six-week engagement starting in September 1957; by October, it was rumored he would be moving on to the Desert Inn in Las Vegas, but it was announced in November that he would star in the Broadway production of Flower Drum Song as Wang Ta, the Americanized son promised to Mei Li; he would go on to reprise the role in the Hollywood film version of the musical, released in 1961.

=== Decline and legacy ===
Despite the popularity of Flower Drum Song, business at the club declined, hurt by the increase in the cabaret tax in 1944. By the late 1950s it was facing increasing competition from more explicit shows, such as the Condor Club in North Beach. The rise of television also killed the culture of live performance, as people slowly transitioned to watching performances from the comfort of their home. Owner Charlie Low retired in 1962, selling the club to exotic dancer Coby Yee. Yee managed the club until it closed in 1970.

In 1970, it re-opened as the Sutter Cinema, by Arlene Elster, a member of the Sexual Freedom League.

The space was destroyed by a fire in the 1980s, but the building has survived and was used as a computer instruction center as of 2000. As of October 2015, the space was available as an open-plan office.

An hour-long documentary, Forbidden City, U.S.A., was filmed in the mid-1980s by Chinatown native Arthur Dong and released in 1989, featuring most of the original cast. A DVD was released in 2003. The documentary led indirectly to a second singing career for Larry Ching, the club's "Chinese Frank Sinatra." Excerpts from two 78 RPM acetate disks were played in the documentary, and included in Ching's debut album Till the End of Time (2003).

== Description ==
The Forbidden City has been compared to an Asian-American version of the Cotton Club, in that it featured an all-ethnic cast of performers for a mostly white audience, performing to the popular tastes of the time rather than in stereotyped or authentic ethnic roles. However, some acts played up the supposed exoticism of ethnic Chinese, as well as sensuality of Chinese women. The owner, Charlie Low, generated publicity by describing the performers as Chinese equivalents of famous mainstream celebrities (for example, the "Chinese Frank Sinatra", the "Chinese Fred Astaire", and so on). Part of the club's appeal to both audiences and performers was the "racial cross-dressing" of placing Asian Americans into traditionally white entertainer roles, and the racial dialog that came out of the varying level of success of the various performers had in fitting into these roles.

For many visitors from middle-America, Forbidden City was their first exposure to people with Asian heritage. San Francisco's Asian population was approximately 4.2% of the population in 1940, versus 0.2% for all of the United States. Although the cast included Filipino Americans, Japanese Americans (except during World War II, when the club's Japanese American performers were removed as part of the Japanese American internment), Korean Americans and other Asian Americans, they were presented to audiences as Chinese.

The club itself seated 300, and also contained elaborate stage area and dressing rooms (accessed through the kitchen). Typical of the clubs of the time, in front, it displayed pictures of famous guests (greeted by Low). The club was patronized by Hollywood celebrities, such as Humphrey Bogart, Lauren Bacall, Anna May Wong, Bing Crosby, Eddie Cantor, Duke Ellington, Judy Garland, George Jessel, Lena Horne, Jane Wyman, and Ronald Reagan.

An evening's entertainment at Forbidden City typically started with a dinner that was ostensibly "Chinese" cuisine, but it was a fusion of Chinese and American cuisine, with steak on the menu. Dinner would be followed by dancing, then a floor show. The floor show typically opened with performers dressed in traditional Chinese clothing. The performers would then shed the traditional clothing and perform modern song and dance. Acts were a combination of vaudeville and burlesque-style performances, including singing, tap dancing, ballroom dancing, skits, slapstick, tumbling, and parodies of American cowboy scenes. The show included burlesque performers like Coby Yee, dancers such as Toy & Wing and Mai Tai Sing, and singers such as Larry Ching ("Chinese Sinatra"), who performed six nights per week with a band. Each show typically lasted 45 minutes.

The club also formed a touring company that played across the United States and Canada, as well as USO shows worldwide.

== Notable performers ==
A number of Asian American musicians, actors, and other celebrities either started their professions at the Forbidden City, or are famous for performing there. During the early years of the club the performers' salaries, modest as they were, provided rare employment opportunities for Asian-Americans suffering under the discriminatory laws of the time.

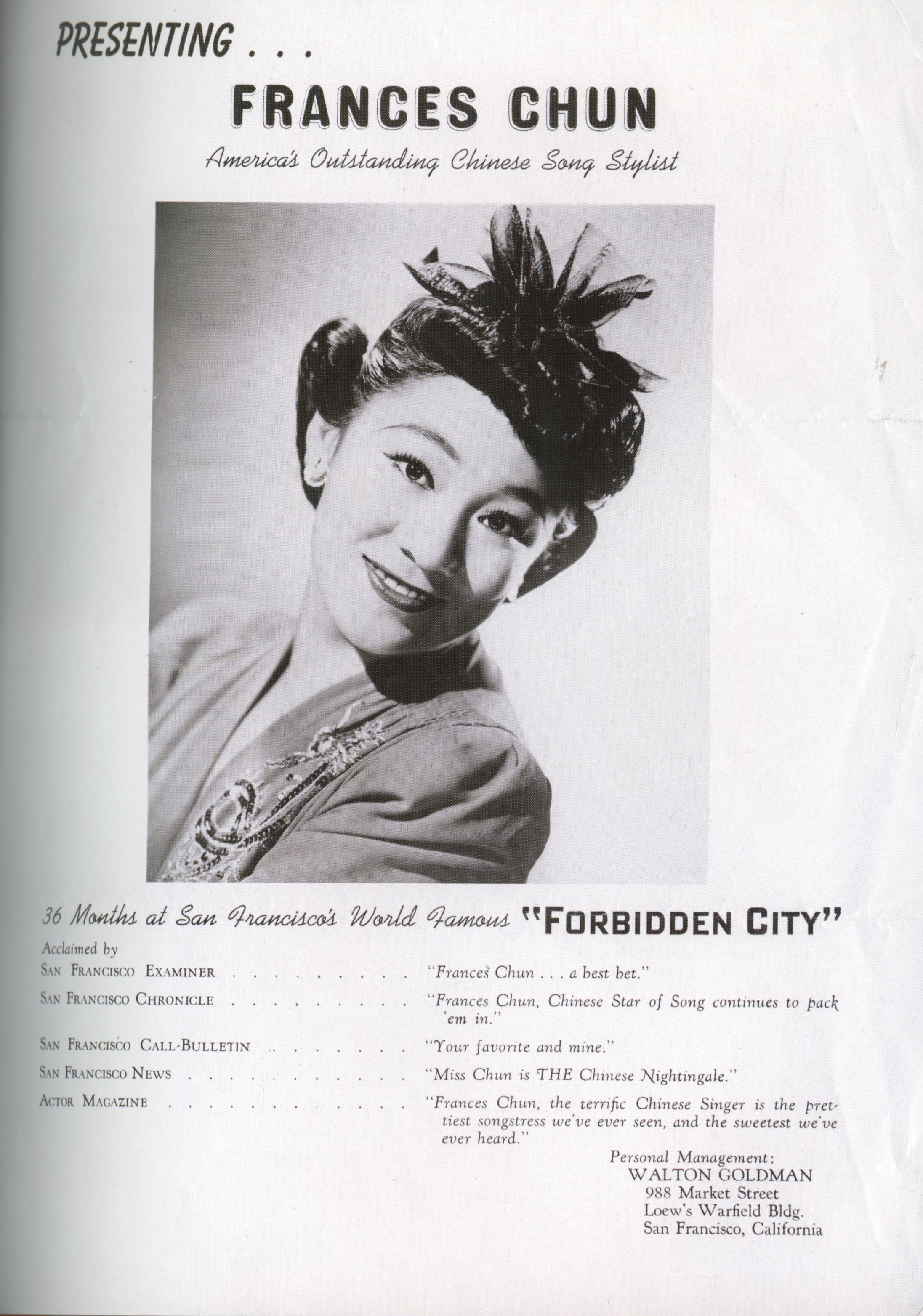
A poster presenting Frances Chun performing outside of Forbidden City

=== Frances Quan Chun (1919-2008) ===
Frances Quan Chun was a singer billed as the "Chinese Frances Langford" . According to her interview in the book Forbidden City, USA, she stated that it was a "novelty" at the time to work at the Forbidden City as a singer in the 30's regardless of its scandalous reputation. Born and raised in a musical family in Hawaii, her father loved playing instruments such as ukulele and guitar. She eventually landed in San Francisco during the Depression era. She participated in Cathayans (a band) in the early 1930s, where she was 16. Then, she joined Forbidden City in her 20's.

=== Jackie Mei Ling (1914-2000) ===
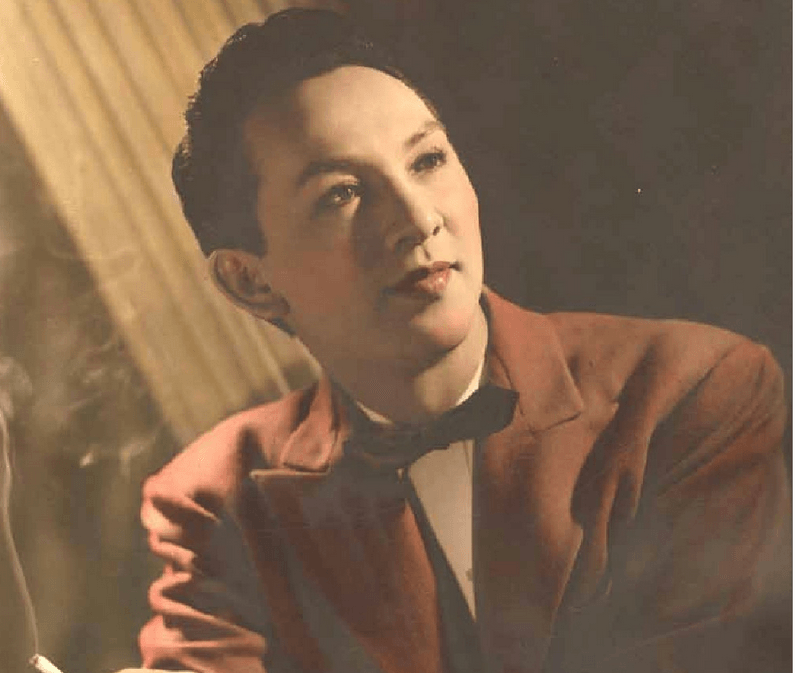
Jackie Mei Ling

Jackie Mei Ling, a very famous and successful dancer and female impersonator, publicly identified himself as a gay man. He is famous for his innovative Oriental dance in various performances. He once played the role of harem master in the show "The Girl in the Gilded Cage", with his body contorting in a series of postures.

Ling was born in Utah and moved to Chinatown at a young age. He met Jadin Wong when he was a performing at another club before Forbidden City. Then, as a team, they started dancing at Grace Hayes Lodge. Later, Ling and Wong started performing as featured stars at Forbidden City, making up to 75 to 100 dollars a week. He also designed costumes for other dancers who worked at the nightclub.

=== Jadin Wong (1913-2010) ===
Jadin Wong was a singer, dancer and later Asian talent manager.

She was born in Marysville but raised in Stockton, California; raised by a conservative father who was a cook, Wong recalled how dance was never something her family supported despite her mother's love of music. Wong would sneak out from the window of her house to watch shows hosted by traveling dance companies. She then moved to San Francisco after the death of her father. She eventually joined Forbidden City after meeting Charlie Low and his wife when she was taking dance classes at Michio Itō's School of Dance. She also taught choreography to Noel Toy after Toy's first bubble dance because of Toy's inexperience with dance.

=== Noel Toy (1918-2003) ===
I had no problem with my folks. Of course, they didn't KNOW.

— Noel Toy on whether her parents accepted her nude dancing career, remarks at the DVD release party for Forbidden City, U.S.A., quoted in Asian Connections (2003)

Noel Toy, the "Chinese Sally Rand", performed a burlesque fan dance and bubble dance which started the golden age of Forbidden City. She was born in San Francisco, but raised in the small town of Inverness in Marin County. Growing up, Toy recalls herself as the only Chinese person and only having Caucasian friends. After attending Marin Junior College, she received a scholarship from University of California at Berkeley. She first started as a nude model at the Golden Gate International Exposition due to financial needs. That's where she met Charlie Low, who offered her a salary of 50 dollars per week to perform at Forbidden City, instead of the 35 dollars that Toy was making at the World's Fair.

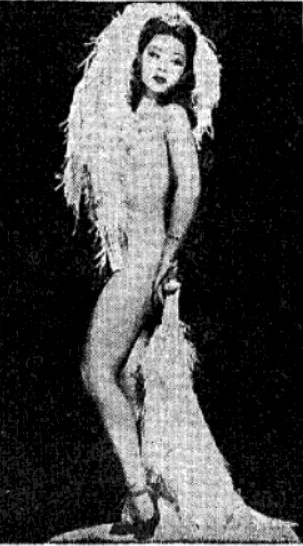
Toy in costume

The bubble dance attracted many male Caucasian customers who were curious if an Asian woman's genitals were shaped the same as white women's. Toy also recalled her first performance at Forbidden City as "silly scared" because she kept falling and bumping into customer's tables.

Toy only performed at the Forbidden City for a year. After that, she was scouted to perform at the Chinese Sky Room, which was a similar Chinatown nightclub. She then moved on to perform in different nightclubs around the East Coast including Philadelphia, Baltimore, and New York City, making up to 500 dollars a week.

=== Coby Yee ===
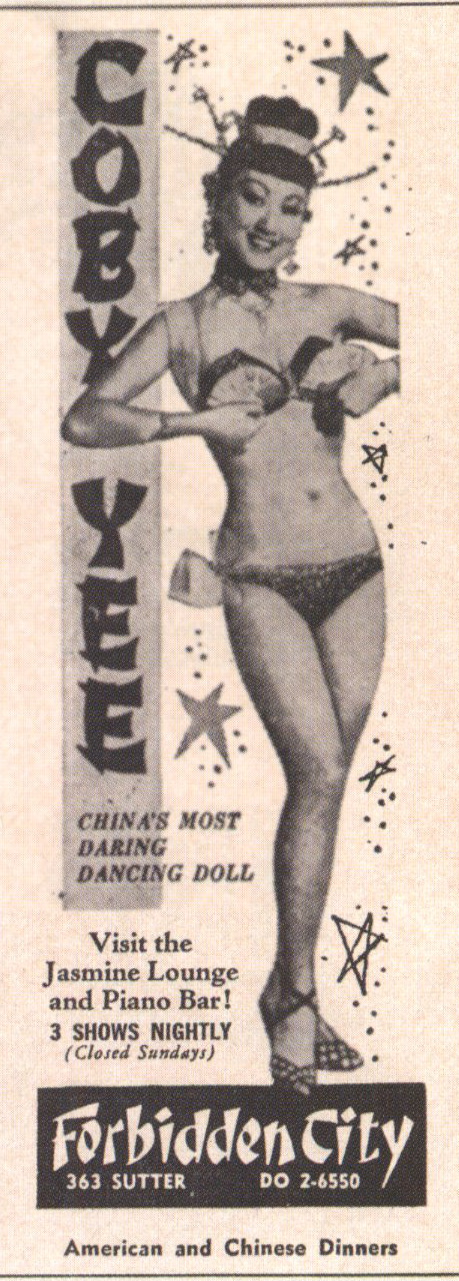
Forbidden City ad featuring Coby Yee

Coby Yee was an exotic dancer billed as "China's Most Daring Dancing Doll". Yee later bought The Forbidden City club from Charlie Low when he retired in 1962 and managed the club until it closed in 1970.

Yee was born to Chinese immigrants living in Columbus, Ohio on November 2, 1926; as a teenager, she performed in her uncle's supper club in Washington, D.C. When her parents came to San Francisco after World War II to return to China, she and her older sister, Fawn, refused to follow them and stayed in the Bay Area. After a drunken patron wandered into her dressing room at the Forbidden City, she quipped "I have never been so embarrassed. He caught me standing there completely clothed!" Although she retired after the Forbidden City closed, she remained active in the community and made many hand-sewn costumes in her San Pablo home. In 2015, Cynthia Yee (no relation), a Dorothy Toy protégée as well as a Chinese Skyroom substitute dancer and, later, 1967 Miss Chinatown San Francisco, came across Coby Yee teaching ballroom dancing to seniors and persuaded her to join Cynthia's Grant Avenue Follies, alongside existing members Cynthia Yee, Pat Chin, Ivy Tam, Lillian Poon, Emily Chin, and Avis See-Tho. The Burlesque Hall of Fame named her a "Living Legend" in 2020; she died on August 14, 2020, the day before she was scheduled to receive the award in a virtual ceremony.

=== Other performers ===
- Larry Ching, the "Chinese Frank Sinatra" performed here, from shortly after the club opened until shortly before it closed. Ching recorded and released his debut album Till the End of Time, then celebrated the declaration of "Larry Ching Day" (June 28, 2003) shortly before his death on July 5.
- Dorothy Toy and Paul Wing, a married couple billed as the "Chinese Ginger Rogers and Fred Astaire", respectively
- Jack Soo was discovered working there as emcee, leading to his first big break when he was cast as the emcee and night club owner in the Broadway musical and film of Flower Drum Song; he later became one of the most prominent Asian American actors in film and television roles.
- Jade Ling was Jackie Mei Ling's dancing partner for a time. Ling came from Boston and first danced at her fathers nightclub. She then ran away to San Francisco to dance at the Forbidden City. In the early 1960s, after she finished her dancing career, she started a hair salon and lived in San Francisco until the 2010s when she moved back to the Boston area to be near her sister's family. She died on September 28, 2020.
- Stanley Toy, a solo "Chinese Fred Astaire".
- Katy de la Cruz, the "Queen of Filipino Jazz", was a top-billed performer during the late 1940s to early 1950s.
- Larry and Trudie Long, "The Leungs," nightclub act.
- 22 August 1953 performers included: Taula Gladys Wong, Connie Tarks, Constance Lint, Jackie Wong, the Tal Sings and Toy Yat Mar.
- Pat Chin, Dottie Sun, Mary Mammon, and Mai Tai Sing all learned to dance from the Forbidden City choreographer, Walton Biggerstaff.

=== The owner of the nightclub: Charlie Low ===
Charles P. Low was youngest of seven children, born on June 9, 1901, in McDermott, Nevada. He arrived in the Bay Area in 1922, when he was 21, and made a fortune in real estate and by trading on the stock market. Low completed the Low Apartments in 1927, 1060 Powell (at Washington), after Caucasian landlords refused to rent to him. Low went on to open the first cocktail bar in Chinatown, the Chinese Village, on November 12, 1936, at 702 Grant Ave; Dr. Margaret Chung was one of the early investors in the Chinese Village. Despite warnings that Chinese American residents would not patronize the Chinese Village, Low drew enough business from tourists to pack the small space regularly, prompting him to consider moving to a larger space where entertainment, not cocktails, would be the emphasis.

Guests at the Forbidden City could purchase a 5x7 image of their evening, which came in a souvenir folder that was signed by their host, Charlie Low.

Low was married four times: first to Minnie Louie, then to Li Tei Ming (who was the pianist and singer at the Chinese Village), Betty Wong, and Ivy Tam (who also worked at the Forbidden City).

== See also ==
- Showgirl Magic Museum
- Queer history in Chinatown, San Francisco
- China Dolls, a 2014 novel by Lisa See set partly in the Forbidden City nightclub
- Sutter Cinema
- Last Night at the Telegraph Club, a 2021 novel by Malinda Lo, which mentions the Forbidden City nightclub as one of its inspirations
