= The Chairman =

The Chairman may refer to:

- The Chairman (1964 film), a Soviet drama film
- The Chairman (1969 film), a spy film
  - The Chairman (Jerry Goldsmith album), soundtrack album for the 1969 film
- The Chairman (M.I album), 2014
- zh:董事長樂團, a Taiwanese band

== See also ==
- Chairman
