= China Dolls (novel) =

2014 novel by Lisa See

- Author: Lisa See
- Cover artist: Thomas Ng (design)
- Language: English
- Publisher: Random House, Inc.
- Publication date: 2014
- Publication place: United States
- ISBN: 978-0-8129-9289-2

China Dolls is a 2014 novel by Lisa See. It depicts the largely forgotten world of Chinese American nightclubs and performers of the '30s and '40s. The book opens with a quotation attributed to Buddha: "Only three things cannot be long hidden: the sun, the moon, and the truth." See organizes her narrative around these three elements – The Sun (October 1938 – August 1940; The Moon (August 1940 – September 1945); and The Truth (December 1945 – June 1948). The novel briefly concludes with a reunion of many of the main characters in 1988.

The novel debuted at #10 on the New York Times Best Seller list of hardcover fiction. It led the San Francisco Chronicle's list of recommended new books June 15, 2014.

== Background ==
See did extensive research in writing China Dolls. Part of it involved interviews with performers from the world she writes about in the novel. This process was very important in developing her story. "I have incorporated many anecdotes from people who lived through the Chinese-American nightclub era to create my fictional characters." She has posted an online collection of materials related to the people, places, music, and events that provide historical background to the novel. See originally wrote the novel with Grace as narrator but later revised it so that Grace, Ruby, and Helen alternate the narration.

China Dolls was partly inspired by the real life of Midi Takaoka of the vaudeville act Taka Sisters. Midi was tragically murdered in a love triangle in 1936 at the age of 22. The murderer of Midi Takaoka, one of her former lovers, confessed to the crime after turning himself in to the police and was sentenced to life imprisonment with the possibility of parole after five years. An additional five years mandatory sentence was added for his assault of Takaoka's current lover during her murder.

Recently See has remarked: "I've been very lucky in the sense that I don't write what I think people might like. I really write about the things that I'm most passionate about, I'm most interested in, or obsessed with. I'm lucky that readers have gone along with my obsessions." Her continued search for stories that have been largely forgotten or hidden – the lives of Chinese American nightclub performers and the injustice of the American treatment of Japanese American citizens during the war, for example – remains central to her work as a writer.

== Plot ==
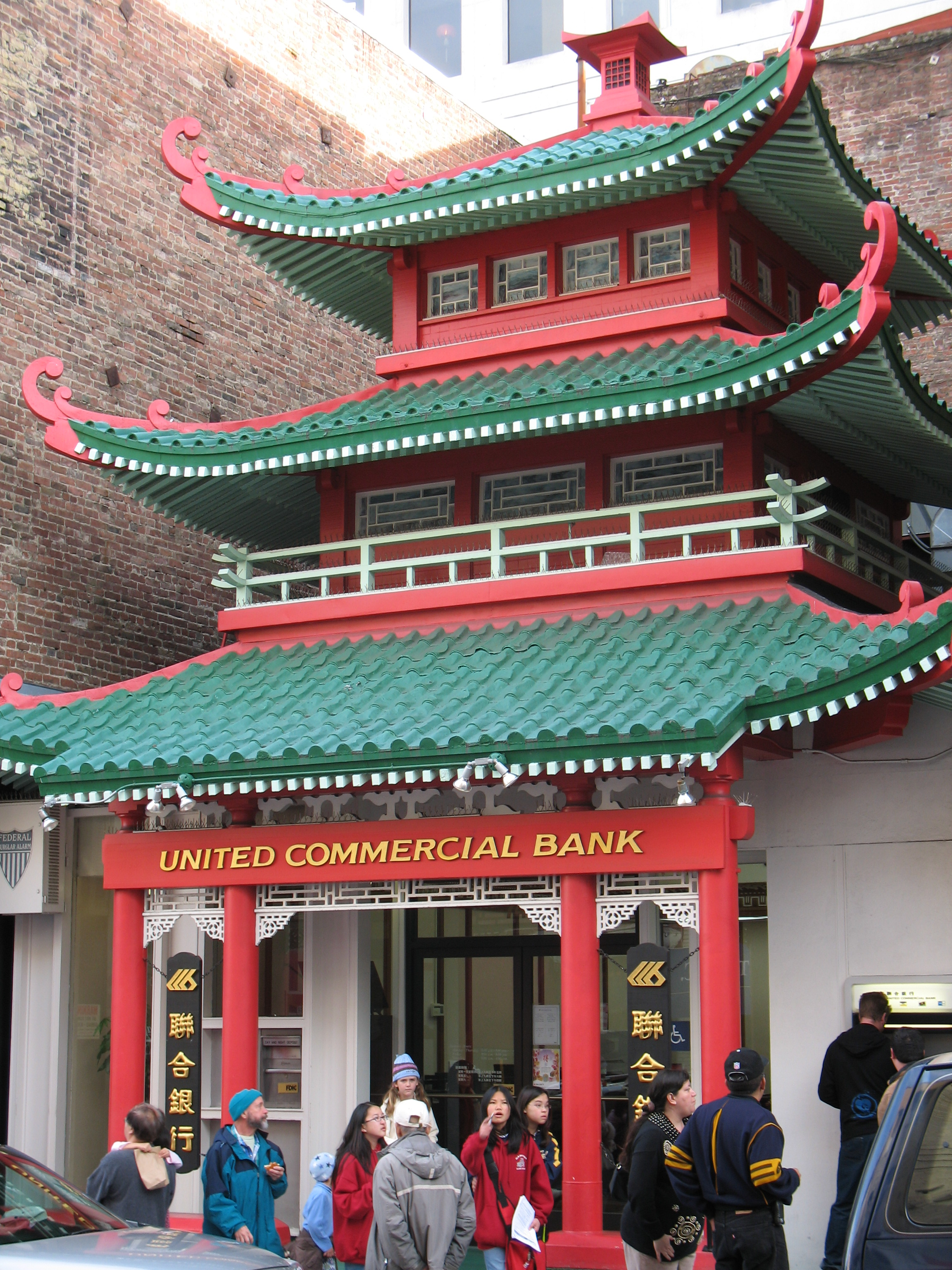
Chinese Telephone Exchange on Washington in Chinatown, San Francisco, where Helen is working when she meets grace

China Dolls centers on three young women who are attracted to the San Francisco nightclub scene right before American involvement in World War II. At first Grace Lee, Helen Fong, and Ruby Tom seem the unlikeliest of friends. Grace is a seventeen-year-old Chinese American from Plain City, Ohio. She escapes to San Francisco to get away from an abusive father but is also driven by dreams of stardom based on her dancing skills. Where Grace has been completely cut off by her family from her Chinese heritage, Helen is a virtual prisoner in the wealthy family compound of her father, forced to play a subservient role in a Chinese world that denies her freedom. Ruby Tom brings a completely different background to the mix. Coming from a Japanese family with strong roots in Japanese history and culture, Ruby is totally committed to becoming famous in America, leaving her parents in Hawaii to do so.

By chance Helen runs into Grace when she is seeking help in finding a Chinese nightclub that might hire her as a dancer. In helping Grace find Charlie Low's new Forbidden City (nightclub), Helen is tempted to try out as well since no previous experience is needed. At the dance tryouts, Helen and Grace meet Ruby Tom (Kimiko Fukutomi) – a very attractive dancer who was born in Los Angeles but then moved to Hawaii with her Japanese family. When Grace affirms that she wants to be a star, Ruby confesses that she loves glitter and wants to be famous. This is based on the life of legendary dancer Jadin Wong.

Although the three young women are immediately drawn to each other, the reader soon senses that their deepening friendship will be threatened by conflicts over careers, love, and hidden secrets. Ruby is aware of some of this from the very beginning: "The three of us were as different as could be, and ... I had a hunch that the two of them were harboring deeper truths, just as I was ... Friendship was uncharted territory for me, maybe for all of us. Would the three of us end up as good companions or as vicious enemies?"

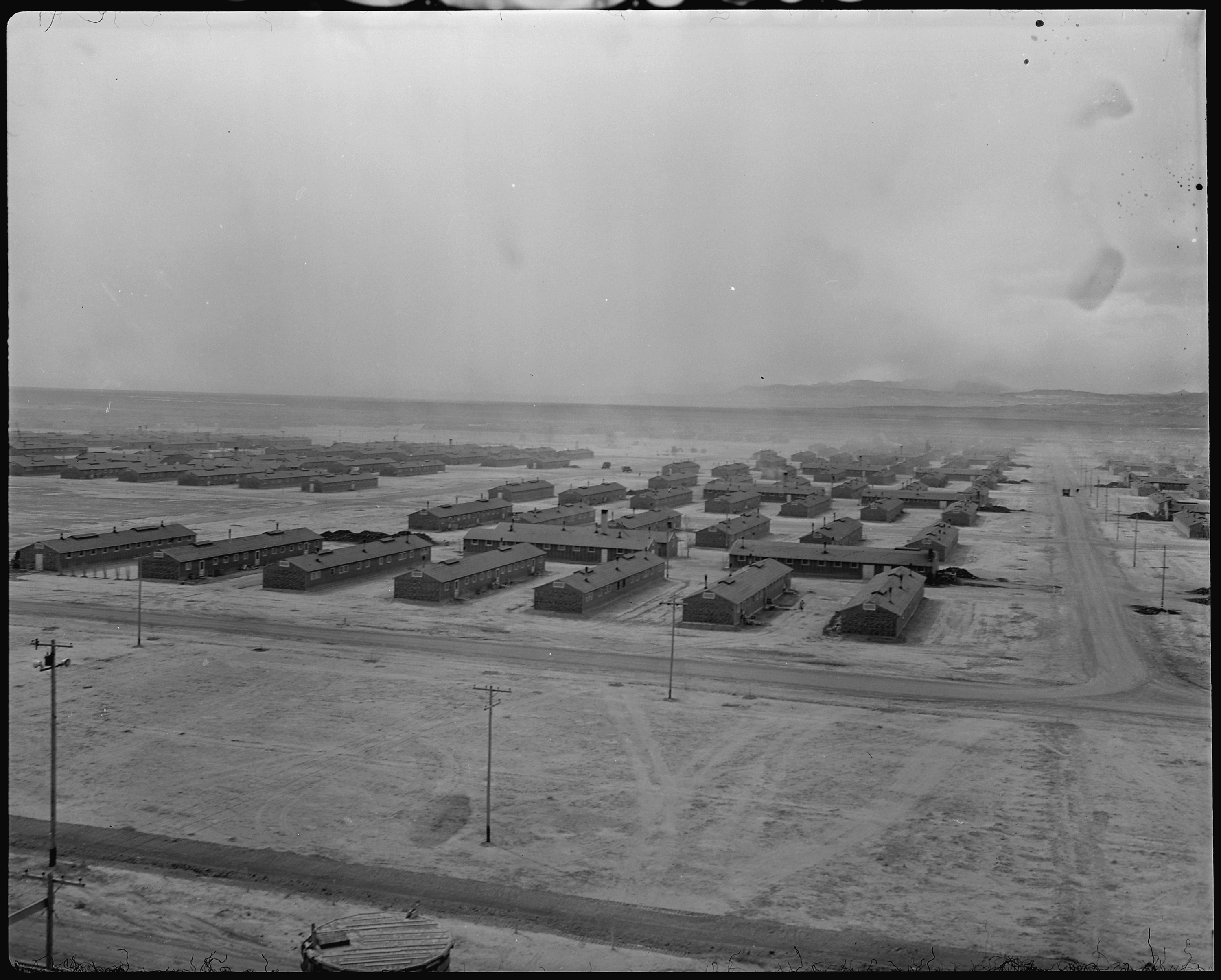
Topaz War Relocation Center (1943)

Although each woman struggles with the difficult challenge of becoming successful as an Asian American performer in an Occidental world as well as with the trauma associated with World War II, their individual paths are different. Grace must learn how to become tougher as she deals with first love, betrayal, repeated career rejection, and good breaks that often lead to bad consequences. Ruby's determination to become famous at any cost leads her to parlay work as an exotic performer into a starring role at The Forbidden City. Although her family suffers immediately from the Japanese attack on Pearl Harbor and from the anti-Japanese reaction that follows, Ruby insists that she is an American and tries to pass herself off as a Chinese performer – until her true identity is betrayed to the FBI and she is sent to the Topaz War Relocation Center in Utah. The importance of Helen's role in the novel is only fully revealed at the end. In a complex relationship with her two friends, it turns out that Helen's secrets are the most important of all and the key to understanding the dynamics of how the three women relate to each other. Quite appropriately Ruby's depiction of the final confrontation of the three is in a chapter called "The Dark Shadow Side".

== Reviews ==
Michael Magras discussed China Dolls in the context of See's writing as a whole, particularly from Snow Flower and the Secret Fan to the present. He suggested that the main themes of Snow Flower and the Secret Fan—female friendship, the ties that bind women together as women, and how women stand by each other—apply to all her recent fiction, including China Dolls. The latter is "a compelling story" containing "powerful passages." He concluded that See's work transcends the category of women's fiction, warranting "wider respect for the distinctive worlds she recreates and the care she takes in depicting the relationships within them", thus appealing to both male and female readers.

Jennifer Keishin Armstrong wrote that the best part of China Dolls is its treatment of Chinese American women during the 1930s and '40s. For example, "the way the girls simply accept being exoticized sex objects as the price of being an 'Oriental' dancer – and often play to stereotypes in their desperation to be noticed." Valerie Minor emphasized the novel's treatment of the suffering of Japanese Americans during World War II, focusing especially on the impact of the war on Ruby and her family. Eugenia Zukerman terms China Dolls a "superb new historical novel", adding that "the conclusion of this emotional, informative and brilliant page-turner resonates with resilience and humanity." Publishers Weekly noted the alternation of points of view among the three main characters, "with each woman's voice strong and dynamic, developing a multilayered richness as it progresses. The depth of See's characters and her winning prose makes this book a wonderful journey through love and loss." Kirkus Reviews faults the novel's "episodic and creaky plot" yet concludes by praising See for shedding light on a part of show business history that has been largely overlooked.
