= Sheila Hamanaka =

American writer

- Occupations: children's author and illustrator
- Known for: 1992 American Book Award

Sheila Hamanaka is an American freelance children's author and illustrator.

== Life ==
Hamanaka is a Sansei Japanese American, the daughter of actor Conrad Yama and Mary Takaoka of the Vaudeville group Taka Sisters. She has two older siblings; the writer and musician V. Vale, and musician/singer Lionelle Hamanaka.

Hamanaka lives in Tappan, New York.

== Awards ==
- 1992 American Book Award for The Journey

== Works ==
- The Journey: Japanese Americans, Racism and Renewal. Orchard Books. 1990. ISBN 978-0-531-05849-7.
- Peace Crane. Morrow Junior Books. 1995. ISBN 978-0-688-13815-8.
- On the wings of peace. Clarion Books. 1995. ISBN 978-0-395-72619-8.
- All the Colors of the Earth. HarperCollins. 1999. ISBN 978-0-688-17062-2.
- In Search Of The Spirit: The Living National Treasures of Japan, 1999 Morrow Junior, Sheila Hamanaka, Ayano Ohmi, ISBN 978-0-688-14607-8
- Grandparents Song. HarperCollins. 2003. ISBN 978-0-688-17852-9.
- The boy who loved all living things: the imaginary childhood journal of Albert Schweitzer. Animal Welfare Institute. 2006. ISBN 978-0-938414-98-8.
- Pablo Puppy's Search for the Perfect Person. Animal Welfare Institute. 2008. ISBN 978-0-938414-91-9.

=== Illustrations ===
- Myra Kornfeld (2005). The Healthy Hedonist: More Than 200 Delectable Flexitarian Recipes for Relaxed Daily Feasts. Illustrator Sheila Hamanaka. Simon and Schuster. ISBN 978-0-7432-5570-7.

=== Criticism ===
- "The "It Girl's" Guide To Chemo ", WBAI.org
- "Slanted Screen: Emasculation of the Asian Male In Film", WBAI.org
