= Sutter Cinema =

- Interactive map of Sutter Cinema
- Location: Sutter Street, San Francisco, California, United States
- Coordinates: 37°47′21.5″N 122°24′23.1″W

Construction
- Opened: 1970
- Closed: 1975

The Sutter Cinema was an adult cinema located on Sutter Street in downtown San Francisco, just off of fashionable Union Square and a few blocks from Chinatown. It was a walk-up, on the second floor 363 Sutter, occupying the space that had previously been one of America's premiere Chinese-owned night clubs, Charlie Low's Forbidden City, which featured dancer Coby Yee.

== History ==
The Sutter Cinema opened in 1970; the owner/manager, also cashier, was Sexual Freedom League member, and one of Janis Joplin's closest friends in high school, Arlene Elster. She was the first, if not the only, woman to operate an adult theater. The clientele was middle-class.

Asian-Americans from nearby Chinatown also frequented the cinema because Elster was one of the few customers of the legendary Sam Wo restaurant to be on friendly terms with its notoriously abusive head waiter Edsel Ford Fong, who she provided with an ample supply of free passes.

The Sutter Cinema was unique, because in pointed contrast to the Mitchell Brothers O'Farrell Theatre, Elster was not primarily motivated by money. She was a member of the Sexual Freedom League, held a benefit for it at the cinema, and felt that her participation in the pornographic film industry was an opportunity to spread sexual freedom as well as earn a living. She was showing sex films out of a feeling that sex films should be shown: "the times now not only allow but require films like ours." She would only show in the theater films that pleased her, some made with her partner Lowell Pickett. "Sutter Cinema played films that Elster wanted to see, films in which woman possessed sexual desires and 'made it' just like men." Elster intended to show erotic films that showed more than a penis going into a vagina. She felt that "erotic film needed to be made of, by, and for men and women. Female orgasms need to be portrayed on the screen at an equal rate to male orgasms." "In December 1970, the cinema with Leo Productions sponsored a five-day erotic film festival toward this end" ("to elevate pornographic film to a higher level of respectability." (To accommodate the crowd, the festival was held at the 800-seat Presidio Theater, but a poster for it says "Sponsored by the Sutter Cinema.") Mary Rexroth's film Intersection (1971) had its premiere at the Sutter, where she also showed the Mary Rexroth film Cozy Cool (1971) and gay porn films. Mary Rexroth is the daughter of the late poet Kenneth Rexroth.

The First International Erotic Film Festival gained a modicum of literary cache thanks to the presence of festival judges, critic Arthur Knight and erotic book publisher Maurice Girodias. As a result, the festival drew the attention of the producers and talent spotters of the Johnny Carson Show, who invited Elster to do a segment on the program, which aired in January, 1971.

By 1975 Elster was disenchanted, because of police harassment (she was arrested 14 times, and paid a fine of $1000) and the lack of quality movies to show. From 1975 to 1976 she sublet the cinema, moved with her lesbian partner to Sonoma County, and, like Fred Halsted, operated a wholesale plant nursery. The cinema closed shortly after.

== Archives ==
Archival material related to the Sutter Cinema, including a press kit for Intersection, is held in the Arlene Elster papers at the GLBT Historical Society in San Francisco.

== See also ==
- Forbidden City (nightclub)
