= Emerald Yeh =

American journalist

- Born: May 1956 (age 70); Princeton, New Jersey, U.S.
- Education: University of Hawaii (BA); Columbia University (MS)
- Occupations: TV journalist and philanthropist
- Years active: 1977–present
- Spouse: Ron Blatman (m. 1993)

Emerald Yeh (born May 1956) is an American journalist and philanthropist who is a CNN morning news anchor. She was an anchor for the local NBC affiliate KRON in the San Francisco Bay Area from 1984 to 2003, until KRON scaled back local news programming following the loss of NBC affiliation.

== Personal life and education ==
Yeh was born in Princeton, New Jersey to Zuei-Zong (sometimes romanized as Rui Zong) and Suchu Yeh, immigrants from Taiwan. Her father Zuei-Zong Yeh was pursuing his doctorate in mathematics from Princeton University. After her father completed his studies the family (including Emerald's younger brother, Elm) traveled to Hong Kong, Tokyo, and Macau before settling in Honolulu, Hawaii, where her father taught mathematics at the University of Hawaii. Yeh was raised in Hawaii. She is named for her birth stone.

Yeh graduated from Kaimuki High School and completed her undergraduate studies at the University of Hawaii with a major in journalism and a minor in political science, then earned a master's degree in journalism from Columbia University.

Yeh married Ron Blatman in December 1993. They have two twin boys (born April 1997). Larry Ching sang at Yeh's wedding.

== Broadcasting career (1978-2003) ==
Yeh began her broadcast career as an intern for KITV (the ABC affiliate in Honolulu) in 1977, while still attending the University of Hawaii and working for the school newspaper; she ended up graduating a semester late and continued working at KITV for an additional six months before starting graduate school at Columbia in 1979. After she graduated in 1980, Yeh moved on to KPTV in Portland, Oregon for nearly three years. After KPTV, Yeh was the co-anchor for CNN Daybreak on CNN in 1983. When interviewing with CNN, she was asked why she couldn't style her hair like Connie Chung.

She moved to the Bay Area in 1984, joining KRON as the weekend co-anchor. While at KRON, Yeh gave up the 11 PM co-anchor spot to begin reporting on social issues and human interest stories in 1991; she was named the co-anchor of "Midday" and began working as the "Contact 4" consumer reporter in 1994. Nearly two decades and nine Emmy Awards later, (Note: Yeh won local Emmys for: 1986: Interview/Discussion (for "Grandparents' Rights"); 1987: Sports: Single Story or Segment (for "Skipper Lynn"); 1989: News Feature – Single Story (for "Transplant Pioneer"); 1990: Current Affairs-Special/Series (for "Children of Courage"); 1998: News and Program: Cultural Affairs Segment (for "The Rape of Nanking"); 1999: News: Serious News Feature-Series (for "Who Owns Your Health?"); 2002: News: Specialized Reporting (for "Consumer Reports Composite"); 2003: News: Specialized Reporting (for "Consumer Composite"); 2004: News and Program: Documentary (for "Lost Childhood: Growing Up in an Alcoholic Family")) After the station lost the NBC affiliation, Yeh was let go by KRON in 2003 to cut costs.

== Philanthropy career 2003-present ==
Yeh is a longtime philanthropist and advocate for Asian American issues, including serving as a founding board member for the Asian Pacific Fund.
