= Kaimuki High School =

Location
- 2705 Kaimuki Avenue; Honolulu, Hawaii 96816; United States

Information
- Type: Public, high school
- Established: 1943; 83 years ago
- School district: Hawaii State Department of Education
- Principal: Jamie Dela Cruz
- Faculty: 48.00 (FTE) (2022–23)
- Grades: 9–12
- Gender: Co-educational
- Enrollment: 620 (2022–23)
- Student to teacher ratio: 12.92 (2022–23)
- Campus: Urban
- Colors: Green and Gold
- Athletics: Oahu Interscholastic Association
- Mascot: Bulldog
- Accreditation: Western Association of Schools and Colleges
- Newspaper: The Bulldog
- Yearbook: Ka Hali'a
- Military: Junior Reserve Officers' Training Corps (JROTC)
- Website: kaimukihs.org

Kaimuki High School is a comprehensive four-year, co-educational high school accredited by the Western Association of Schools and Colleges (WASC). The school is located in Honolulu, Hawaiʻi, United States, and falls under the jurisdiction of the Hawaii Department of Education. It is bordered by the Manoa-Palolo Drainage Canal, Kapiolani Boulevard, Kaimuki Avenue, Crane Park and Date Street. It is, as its alma mater states, in view of Diamond Head. The campus boasts the sculpture Pueo (owl) by Charles W. Watson.

Kaimuki High School is one of the six public schools in the Honolulu District. As of the 2023-2024 school year, the school has an enrollment of 620 students.

Kaimuki draws its students from the feeder schools of Jarrett Middle and Washington Middle.

== History ==
During World War II, a McKinley Annex was established at Kaimuki Intermediate School for sophomores and juniors living in the area. Ninth grade was added in 1983. In September 1943, it became Kaimuki High School. The student body adopted a constitution in 1944.

In 1947, plans were made for a new campus, and construction began.

== Governance ==
Kaimuki High School is part of the Hawaii Department of Education Kaimuki-McKinley-Roosevelt Complex Area along with McKinley High School and Roosevelt High School.

=== Kaimuki Complex ===
The Kaimuki Complex consists of 9 elementary and middle schools in addition to Kaimuki High School.

- Ala Wai Elementary School
- Aliiolani Elementary School
- Hokulani Elementary School
- Jarrett Middle School
- Jefferson Elementary School
- Kuhio Elementary School
- Lunalilo Elementary School
- Palolo Elementary School
- Washington Middle School

=== Feeder Middle Schools ===
Kaimuki High School feeds primarily from 3 middle schools in the Honolulu area.

- William Paul Jarrett Middle School
- President George Washington Middle School
- Kaimuki Middle School

== Curriculum ==
As of 2026, the school is ranked #39-53rd in the state, and #13,460-17,945 in national rankings on U.S. News & World Report.

=== Graduation requirements ===
As of the 2024-2025 school year, per the HIDOE graduation requirements, the school requires a total of 24 credits to graduate. These are four credits in English, four credits in Social Studies, three credits in Mathematics, three credits in Science, two credits in either World Language, Fine Arts, or Career and Career Technical Education/Junior Reserve Officers' Training Corps (JROTC), one credit in Physical Education, half a credit in Health, and half a credit for the Personal Transition Plan (PTP). To earn an Academic Honors certificate, students must have four credits in mathematics and four credits in Science, along with two credits in either AP, IB, or college courses.

For dual-credit, the school offers Running Start and Jump Start. These programs are provided through a collaboration with the University of Hawaiʻi community college system, known as Kaimuki2College. Through the program, students are able to take college-level courses on both the high school campus and at Kapiʻolani Community College.

== Extracurricular activities ==
=== Ohana O Mele ===
At Kaimuki High School there is a musical group called Ohana O Mele, an Polynesian music class founded in 1977. In the class, students learn musical skills on instruments including the ukulele, guitar, electric bass, and drums. Ohana O Mele holds an annual concert at Kaimuki High School called "Kanikapila."

== Campus ==
By September 1950, a total of 45 standard sized classrooms, three shops, and a cafeteria. The administration building opened in October 1950. The school's colors, Kelly green and light gold, were adopted that year.

Between 1951 and 1953, additional buildings for business, agriculture, science, art, homemaking, mechanical drawing, publications, and physical education were completed. In 1954, grandstands to accommodate 1,554 students were built on campus these grandstands were dismantled in 1973. The music building was completed during the summer of 1956. A 50-meter swimming pool was completed in 1961. A new auto mechanics shop was completed in 1962. On April 10, 1964, the school had a new gymnasium.

== Notable alumni ==
Listed alphabetically by last name (year of graduation):

- Thelma Kalama Aiu (1931–1999) – swimming gold medalist at the 1948 London Olympics, and a student of Soichi Sakamoto
- Mazie Hirono (1966) – U.S. Senator
- Haunani Kahalewai (1947) - singer
- Bertrand Kobayashi - member of the Hawaii House of Representatives
- Brian Kolfage (1999) – veteran of the United States Air Force and the founder of the organization We Build the Wall
- Ruthie Ann Miles (2001) – actress
- Sharon Moriwaki - member of the Hawaii Senate
- Florence T. Nakakuni – United States Attorney for the District of Hawaii
- Hiro Narita - cinematographer
- Franklin Odo (1957) – author, activist and historian
- Stan Sakai – artist
- Jake Shimabukuro – ukulele virtuoso
- Don Stroud – actor
- Emerald Yeh - journalist
