= Showgirl Magic Museum =

Coordinates: 37°47′36.34″N 122°24′23.76″W

- Location of the Showgirl Magic Museum in downtown San Francisco Showgirl Magic Museum (California) Showgirl Magic Museum (the United States)
- Established: March 2020
- Location: Clarion Performing Arts Center
- Type: History museum
- Founder: Cynthia Yee
- Executive director: Cynthia Yee
- Website: theclarionsf.org/showgirl-magic-museum

The Showgirl Magic Museum is a history and culture museum in the Chinatown neighborhood of San Francisco, California in the United States. The museum showcases on the 20th-century nightclub scene in Chinatown.

== History ==
The Showgirl Magic Museum was founded in 2020 by former nightclub dancer and model, Cynthia Yee. Yee created the concept for the museum in March 2020, when California went under a statewide stay-at-home order due to the COVID-19 pandemic. The basement of the Clarion Performing Arts Center, where Yee serves as vice-president, was serving as a music education space prior to the pandemic. When the space was required to close due to the stay-at-home order, Yee decided the space could be better used as a museum to showcase the once vibrant nightclub and showgirl scene in Chinatown in the 19th century.

The museum was going to open on Halloween 2020, however, more stay-at-home orders required the museum opening to be delayed until May 1, 2021.

== Collection and exhibitions ==
The museum is open by appointment only, with exceptions being special events or performances at the Clarion Performing Arts Center. Guests to the museum are guided through the exhibitions by members of the Grant Avenue Follies, a performance group founded by Yee. Yee also gives tours. Many of the women who guide the tours were performers in Chinatown clubs. They share their personal stories around the objects on display. Portions of the museums are dedicated to specific performers, including Yee, Toy & Wing, and Ivy Tam.

Exhibition showcase historic photographs, clothing, stage craft, jewelry, and other fashion accessories from the 1930s through 1970s, as well as contemporary items showcasing the performances of the Grant Avenue Follies. The collection includes photographs of Frank Sinatra with Chinatown showgirls. The exhibits also examine the stereotypes of East Asians that were often core components to the performances.

== Clarion Performing Arts Center ==
Clarion Performing Arts Center, on Waverly Place, was a music store, opened in 1982; Clara Hsu replaced it with a nonprofit in 2019.

Grant Avenue Follies began in 2004, a traditional floor show, at Clarion Performing Arts Center and on the road for festivals and groups.
