= Jay Richard Kennedy =

American writer

- Born: Samuel Richard Solomonick; July 23, 1911; East Bronx, New York, United States
- Died: October 14, 1991 (aged 80); Westlake, Los Angeles, United States
- Occupations: Author; screenwriter; composer; publisher; record executive

Jay Richard Kennedy (July 23, 1911 - October 14, 1991) was an author, screenwriter, composer, publisher, FBI spy, record executive, and Harry Belafonte's business manager. In his 60s, he worked for Frank Sinatra. In his 70s, he left entertainment and started a psychotherapy clinic called the Center For Human Problems and was accused of practicing psychotherapy without a license in a cultish environment.

== Early years ==
Kennedy was born Samuel Richard Solomonick in the East Bronx, New York, in 1911. Raised in the Bronx, he was the son of Jewish immigrants Isidor Solomonick (died 1974) and Erna E. Solomonick (died 1967).

Leaving school in the seventh grade, Solomonick claimed he spent his teen years traveling around the country and working at about 28 trades and professions, including running a cinema in the Bronx, working on a farm in Kansas, a bricklayer, longshoreman, wrangler, farmer, bricklayer, painter, printer, and even nightclub singer. His job in a print shop led him to join the trade union, and he became an officer of an Industrial Printing Employees Union. An excellent speaker, he was drawn to left-wing causes, notably the American League Against War and Fascism, later changing its name to the American League for Peace and Democracy and the People's Committee Against William Randolph Hearst. Solomonick then became a circulation manager of The Daily Worker, the newspaper published by the Communist Party USA. He became an anticommunist with the signing of the 1939 Soviet-German Non-Aggression Pact. Finding himself unemployed and possibly unemployable due to his anticommunism, he conferred with his friend Andrew Loewi, whose family owned the Park Management Corporation, and he decided to change his name upon seeing a sign reading "Kennedy".

Kennedy went into business partnership in a tool-and-die firm called the Unique Specialties Corporation, followed by a real-estate management organization, Kennedy Management Corporation, which invested in both the United States and Ecuador. With America's entry into World War II, he wrote a Spanish-language radio show called El Mysterioso that was broadcast in Latin America with a pro-American and anti-Fascist focus. From July 10, 1944, to May 20, 1952, the show appeared in an English-language American version called The Man Called X, starring Herbert Marshall.

== Post World War II ==
When his business partner Stanley Levison divorced his wife Janet Alterman Levison, the three remained friends with Kennedy marrying Janet (died May 25, 2003). After the war ended in 1945 Kennedy was employed by the United States Department of the Treasury. He approached Secretary Henry Morgenthau Jr. and the Commissioner of the Federal Bureau of Narcotics Harry J. Anslinger that he tell the story of the Bureau's international work in cooperation with the United States Customs Service, United States Coast Guard and the Treasury with the understanding that the essential facts remain in focus. Kennedy and Sidney Buchman formed their own film company in Hollywood where he wrote and was credited as associate producer of To the Ends of the Earth a thriller about the international activities of the Federal Bureau of Narcotics. Due to the cooperation of the United States Government, the Motion Picture Production Code Motion Picture Production Code was amended to allow for the screen portrayal of the worldwide effort to curb the illicit traffic in narcotics. A planned film on the life of Franklin Delano Roosevelt was never made.

In the 1950s, he started a brokerage firm, Jay R. Kennedy Co. Inc. in New York. In 1953 Kennedy published his first novel, Prince Bart: A Novel of Our Times about Hollywood with speculation the hero was based on John Garfield.

Entertainer Harry Belafonte's manager Jack Rollins introduced Belafonte to the Kennedys in 1953. Dr Janet Alterman Kennedy a psychotherapist at Columbia University saw Belafonte on a frequent professional basis; in 1954 Belafonte replaced Rollins with Jay Kennedy as his manager. With his connections, Kennedy was able to book Belafonte in more prestigious locations. and also co-wrote a musical stage show with and for Belafonte called Sing, Man Sing. Kennedy also became a business manager of actor Richard Conte.

Kennedy returned to screenwriting with I'll Cry Tomorrow (1955) and updated his old radio show The Man Called X into a 1956 television series of the same name for Ziv Television.

In 1956, he received the National Brotherhood award from the Catholic Interracial Council. In the same year he joined ASCAP where his popular song compositions include "Shining Bright", "Blues Is Man", and "Eden Was Like This".

== Later life ==
Maintaining his interest in left wing causes, Kennedy became an adviser to James Farmer of the Congress of Racial Equality

He moderated a TV panel discussion titled 'March on Washington . . . Report by the Leaders' of ten major leaders of the 1963 March on Washington for a production of Metropolitan Broadcasting Television and that was broadcast August 29, 1963

By 1965, Kennedy became an informant for the CIA and likely also the FBI, as he believed Soviet and Chinese Communist agents were attempting to infiltrate and exploit the Civil Rights Movement for their own ends. He had an affair with Elaine Brown who later joined (and then led) the Black Panther Party.

In 1966 he became vice-president of Sinatra Enterprises where he headed the record and music-publishing divisions. He also became a story editor for Sinatra where a screenplay he was originally planning for Sinatra, Spencer Tracy and Yul Brynner to be filmed in Hong Kong was later filmed as The Chairman with Gregory Peck. It was also planned Sinatra and Sammy Davis Jr. would star in the filming of Kennedy's third novel Favor the Runner where Kennedy would write the screenplay and songs for the film. In the same year he acted as executive producer and composer of the title song for The Jean Arthur Show.

In the 1970s, he studied psychotherapy and opened Center for Human Problems Inc. in Tarzana. Patients and a former therapist at the Center claimed Kennedy did not believe licenses to practice psychotherapy were necessary but withheld the lack of licenses of some of the providers from the patients. They claimed under Kennedy's direction patients were taught they could never leave because they would become worse than when they had started and remaining was necessary to continually evolve and live to be over 100. They claimed Kennedy said he was going to live to be 150. Patients claimed they were told to donate monies, in one case even sell business to do so, to make sure the center could pay its bills and so Kennedy could write a book on how to save mankind. The therapy, it was claimed, would prevent sickness. The theory included parents, they claimed were the cause of all illness, and to be well a person should disconnect from his/her parents.

Paul Morantz, an attorney specialist in cults and brainwashing cases, sued on the behalf of two former patients in a case that was settled in 1990. The health department investigated and a center was closed not long before Kennedy's death.

Kennedy died of heart failure on October 14, 1991, in Westlake, Los Angeles. He was survived by one daughter, Susan Hile.

== Bibliography ==
- Garrow, David J. The FBI and Martin Luther King, Jr. - From Solo to Memphis W.W. Norton and Company 2010
