= Jefferson Poland =

American activist, writer, and sex offender

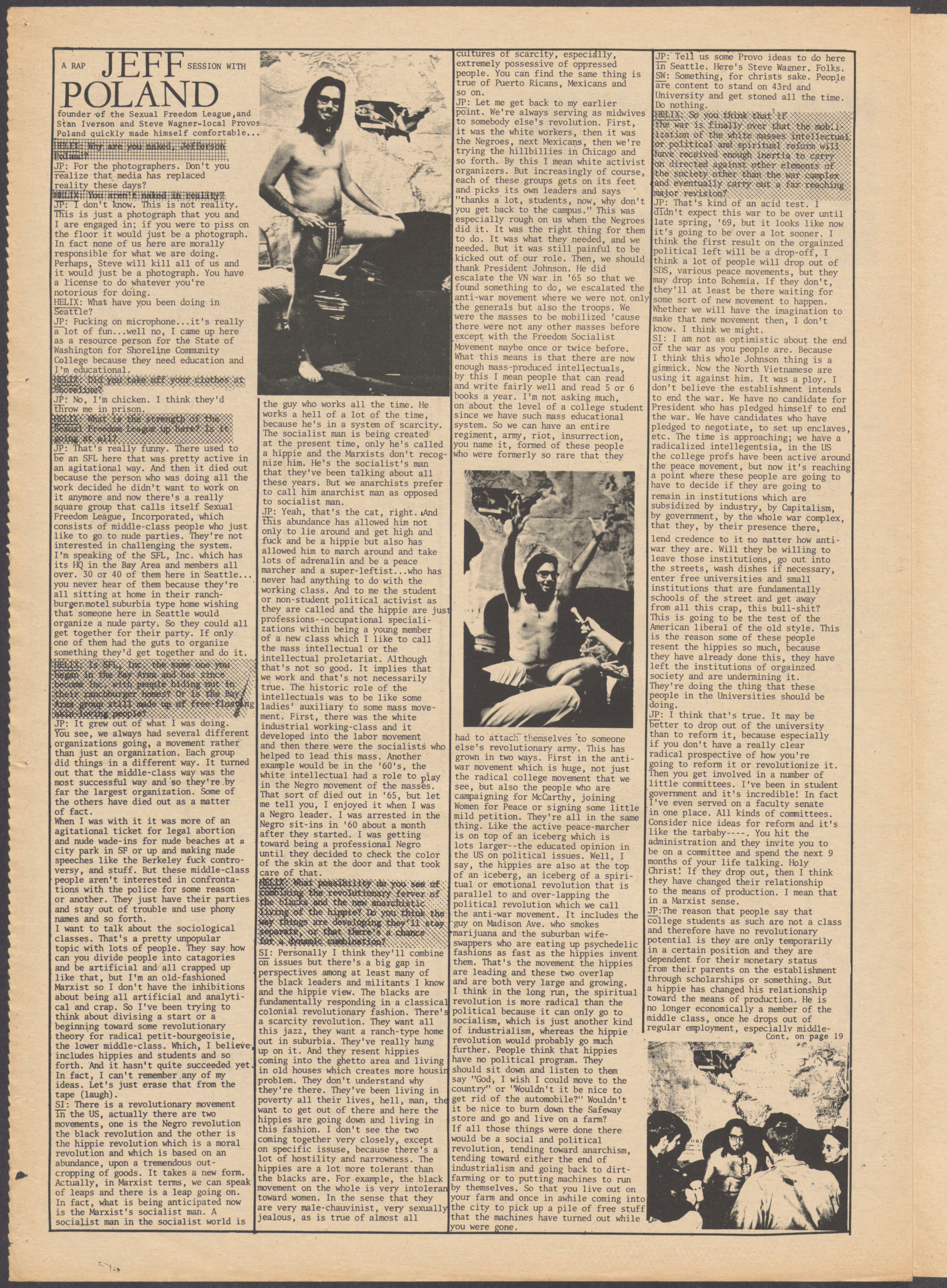
- Jeff Poland interviewed in the Seattle underground paper Helix, 1968
- Born: John Jefferson Poland; July 12, 1942; Indiana, U.S.
- Died: November 17, 2017 (aged 75); San Francisco, California, U.S.
- Other names: Jefferson Fuck Poland; Jefferson Clitlick
- Occupation: Writer
- Known for: Sexual Freedom League

John Jefferson Poland (July 12, 1942 – November 17, 2017), who sometimes went by Jefferson Fuck Poland and Jefferson Clitlick, was an American activist, writer, and convicted sex offender who co-founded the Sexual Freedom League.

== Early life ==
Poland was born in Indiana in 1942. He became a student at Florida State University and majored in sociology. He was expelled from that university in 1960 for his integrationist work with the Congress for Racial Equality (CORE). He participated with the Freedom Riders in Florida and in June 1961 was one of the "Tallahassee Ten" who were arrested for unlawful assembly at a segregated airport restaurant. A year later, he was involved in Ban the Bomb activities.

Poland moved to California and worked as an agricultural labor organizer, renting a room in the home of Dolores Huerta. He worked with CORE to register black voters in Louisiana in the summer of 1963.

Poland participated in one of the first known LGBT rights demonstrations in the United States. Poland, along with organizer Randy Wicker and several others, picketed the Whitehall Induction Center in New York City to protest the US military's exclusion of homosexuals from military service and the violation of confidentiality of gay men's draft records. Sources differ on the date of this demonstration, with some citing 1963 and others 1964.

== Involvement in capital rape case ==
In May 1960, Poland wrote to Florida Governor LeRoy Collins to protest the death sentence recently imposed on convicted child rapist Robert Wesley Davis, whom he had met in jail. Davis had been sentenced to death by a judge after pleading guilty to raping an 11-year-old girl, a crime that he forced two young boys to watch while threatening them with an ice pick. In the letter, Poland, who referred to Davis as "Wes", criticized the state's desire "to exterminate" Davis, whom he described as "a confirmed criminal, an admitted homosexual, [and] a social outcast." Governor Collins wrote back to Poland, saying that Davis could still appeal and seek clemency from the Florida Board of Pardons.

Later that year, the Supreme Court of Florida upheld Davis's death sentence. The justices found that the sentence was warranted given the nature of the crime, Davis's history of prior sex offenses against young boys, and his lack of remorse. The justices concluded that Davis had proven himself to be incapable of rehabilitation and his death sentence was thus fully warranted.

If there be any basis for a recommendation of mercy it must be found in the defendant's background, his handicaps and in his underprivileged upbringing. The defendant's personal history of neglect as a child, early sordid experiences, an unnatural deviation in sex attitudes and relationships, and a long history of crime and delinquency does reveal an individual who has not had the advantage of having instilled in him desirable ideals. However, there have been many efforts to correct his evil ways by custodial detainment and attempted rehabilitation. The defendant has failed to respond and there is no indication that there has ever been any real effort on his part to effect correction. He is and has been a completely dedicated homosexual who would restrain himself in no pay in his quest for gratification of his unspeakable passion, most of which appears to be particularly directed toward youths of tender years. He would furthermore resort to any means, however vicious, to accomplish his purpose.

Expert medical evidence reveals that he is sane and his sanity has not been made an issue and is not an issue. He is a psychopath and an advanced homosexual. However, he knows the evil he does is evil and he knows the crimes he commits are crimes. There is no indication that he was driven by impulses which he cannot control. It is only shown that he will not control them and has no desire to do so.

The defendant was a complete stranger to the children he attacked. He sought them out solely to gratify his fiendish desires. He spared them in no way in seeking to accomplish his mission. He remains even now unrepentant but merely annoyed that he did not commit sodomy on the young boy instead of rape on the girl. He is and remains a menace to any human being exposed to him.

One so callous has earned no right to a mitigation of the full consequences to him which the law provides. This trial judge makes no recommendation of mercy. It thus becomes the awful and painful duty of this Court to enter judgment of guilt and sentence to death.

On March 15, 1961, the Florida Board Pardons rejected a clemency request for Davis. Davis was executed on August 7, 1961. He was the last person to be executed for rape in Florida.

== Sexual Freedom League ==
In 1963, Poland founded the Sexual Freedom League in New York City with Leo Koch. He then moved to the San Francisco Bay Area and focused his organizing efforts near the University of California, Berkeley and San Francisco State University. Poland founded various chapters, including ones in the East Bay, San Francisco, Berkeley and San Diego. However, he did not run these organizations himself; he would found them and then turn them over to others. Poland was a graduate student at San Francisco State University.

Poland, on August 25, 1965, conducted a "Nude Wade-in" he led with Ina Saslow and Shirley Einseidel at Aquatic Park, a public beach in San Francisco. Poland, calling himself "Jefferson Fuck Poland", had, in 1966, his name legally changed thereto and identifying as bisexual. While at San Francisco State University, Poland with Blair Paltridge, were connected with a magazine called Open Process. They were suspended for printing and writing obscene material in the November 14, 1967, issue of the magazine. In 1968, Poland signed the "Writers and Editors War Tax Protest" pledge, vowing to refuse tax payments in protest against the Vietnam War. Poland was a subject and contributor to the underground newspaper the Berkeley Barb.

Poland, after attempting to attend the Berkeley City Council meeting of September 22, 1970, was arrested and later convicted of disturbing the peace and interfering with a police officer in the line of duty. He served 90 days at Santa Rita Rehabilitation Center near Dublin.

== Psychedelic Venus Church ==
In 1970, Poland founded the Psychedelic Venus Church (PsyVen or PVC), an offshoot of the Sexual Freedom League, with Mother Boats becoming president. He felt that the leadership of the Sexual Freedom League was becoming too "bourgeois". Each meeting began with smoking marijuana. The meetings continued in the San Francisco Bay Area until 1972. The Church had 700 members by 1971 but disbanded in 1973.

== Sex offense conviction ==
By 1980, Poland had moved to San Diego. In 1983, Poland was charged with molesting the 8- or 9-year-old daughter of an acquaintance whom he babysat. Poland fled the country and he lived for five years as a fugitive in India, Australia, and New Zealand. In 1988, he was arrested in Hawaii. By that time he had changed his last name legally to "Clitlick". He pled no-contest to California Penal Code 288(a), "lewd or lascivious act with a child under 14 years of age," a felony, and was sentenced to a year in prison and to register as a sex offender.

== Books ==
- Sex Marchers by Jefferson F. Poland and Sam Sloan (1968) ISBN 1881373053 published by Elysium Growth Press, 2nd Edition (2006) ISBN 0-923891-13-7 by Ishi Press
- Second Bite of the Apple, The Bancroft Library, University of California Berkeley, Collection number: BANC MSS 70/143 c
- The Records of the San Francisco Sexual Freedom League by Jefferson F. Poland and Valerie Alison, Olympia Press, 1971, ISBN 0700413200

== Notes ==
=== Cited texts ===
- Allyn, David (2000). Make love, not war: the sexual revolution, an unfettered history. Little, Brown and Company. ISBN 0-316-03930-6. paperback ISBN 0415929423
- Clifton, Chas (2006). Her Hidden Children: The Rise of Wicca and Paganism in America. Rowman Altamira. ISBN 0759102015.
- Fletcher, Lynne Yamaguchi (1992). The First Gay Pope and Other Records. Boston: Alyson Publications. ISBN 1-55583-206-7.
- Grant, Linda (1995). Sexing the Millennium: Women and the Sexual Revolution. Grove Press. ISBN 9780802133496. (reprint)
- Hekma, G. (2014). Sexual Revolutions. Springer. ISBN 978-1137321466.
- Hoffman, Brian (2015). Naked: A Cultural History of American Nudism. NYU Press. ISBN 978-0814790540.
- Holzer, Hans (2015). Witches: True Encounters with Wicca, Covens, and Magick. Hachette Books.
- Rorabaugh, W. J. (2015). American Hippies. Cambridge University Press. ISBN 978-1107049239.
- Schaefer, Eric (2014). Sex Scene: Media and the Sexual Revolution. Duke University Press. ISBN 978-0822376804.
- Sides, Josh (2009). Erotic City: Sexual Revolutions and the Making of Modern San Francisco. Oxford University Press. ISBN 978-0199888542.
