= Noel Toy =

American burlesque performer and actress (1918–2003)

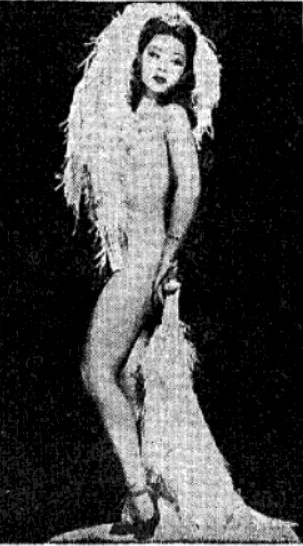
- Toy in 1942
- Born: Ngum Yee Hom; December 27, 1918; San Francisco, California, U.S.
- Died: December 24, 2003 (aged 84); San Francisco, California, U.S.
- Other names: Noel Toy Young the Chinese Sally Rand
- Occupations: Exotic dancer; actress
- Years active: 1939–1999
- Spouse: Carleton Young (m. 1945; died 1994)

Noel Toy (born Ngum Yee Hom; December 27, 1918 – December 24, 2003) was an American burlesque performer famous for her fan dance and bubble dance, initially at the Forbidden City nightclub in San Francisco, California. Later, she acted in films and on television.

== Early years and career ==
Toy was born in San Francisco, California. She was the first of eight children born to parents who immigrated from Canton, China. Toy's parents opened a laundry in Inverness, California, where they were the only Chinese residents. Toy, who was then nicknamed "Emma", was living in 1930 with her parents (Hom Gin "Gin"; Mah "Marion" Shee) and five of her ultimately seven siblings in Point Reyes Station, Marin, California, USA

She performed her routines at the Stork Club and other venues in New York City, before returning to San Francisco, where she was most famous at the Forbidden City nightclub. In her later years, Toy had many small parts in films and television, including a role in Big Trouble in Little China and frequent portrayals of Korean villagers in M*A*S*H.

=== Personal life ===
Toy met a soldier and actor named Carleton Young in 1945, who became enamored with the dancer after seeing her perform at Latin Quarter nightclub in New York. Their engagement was announced in June 1945, however it was called off a few weeks later. Nevertheless, they obtained a marriage license on 19 December 1945 in Manhattan; and married the next day on December 20, 1945, in New York City. They remained married until her husband's death in 1994. They had no children.

== Filmography ==
Year	Title	Role	Notes
1951	Anne of the Indies	Slave Girl	Uncredited
1955	Soldier of Fortune	Luan	Uncredited
1955	How to Be Very, Very Popular	Cherry Blossom Wang	
1955	The Left Hand of God	Woman in Sarong	Uncredited
1981	S.O.B.		
1986	Big Trouble in Little China	Mrs. O'Toole	
1992	Frame-Up II: The Cover-Up	David's Grandmother	
1999	Midnight Temptations 2	Bea	
