= Larry Ching =

- Born: August 27, 1920; Kauai, Hawaii, US
- Died: July 5, 2003 (aged 82); San Francisco, California, US
- Occupation: Singer
- Notable work: Til the End of Time (2003)
- Spouses: Vicki Lee (died 1979); Jane Seid (m. 1991; died 2003)

Larry Ching (August 27, 1920 – July 5, 2003), also known as the "Chinese Frank Sinatra," was an American singer. He was a performer at the Forbidden City nightclub in San Francisco, U.S.A. for nearly 40 years. Ching only came to wider prominence a month before his death after recording a hit record produced by Ben Fong-Torres.

== Biography ==
Ching was born in Kauai, Hawaii, to a Chinese father and Hawaiian mother. He was raised by his grandparents as his mother, opera singer Muilan Naiwi, was studying opera in Europe.

=== First singing career, 1938-1962 ===
Ching taught himself to sing by listening to records on board ship while he was in the Merchant Marines. Visiting the Chinese Village, a bar in Chinatown, at age 17 with his Merchant Marine friends, he convinced the pianist to play while he sang. The owner was so impressed he hired Ching on the spot as a singing bartender.

In 1938, Charlie Low, who'd been a silent partner in the Chinese Village and had heard Ching, opened the Forbidden City, an Asian-themed burlesque and cabaret supper club in downtown San Francisco; soon after the Forbidden City opened, Low asked Ching to join the ensemble of entertainers. By 1942, Ching was a featured performer, promoted in advertisements as the "Chinese Frank Sinatra," in line with Low's marketing ploy, of nicknaming his performers after famous white celebrities. Ching did not approve of his nickname because he preferred Bing Crosby to Sinatra, and did not sound like Sinatra. He would have preferred to be known under his own name. However, the new name stuck, and Ching is still known by it, although Herb Caen, to set the record straight, referred to Frank Sinatra as "the Italian Larry Ching."

Ching was an instant success, although his shyness initially got in the way. "To overcome his nervousness with the patrons," says Jane Seid Ching, his widow, "someone taught him to open his eyes and look over their heads, instead of looking at them." Or, as Ching himself joked: "Two drinks and open your eyes!" Hoagy Carmichael discovered Ching and invited him to work on Carmichael's weekly radio show in Hollywood, but Ching declined.

While at the Forbidden City, Ching, along with other cast members, flirted with female patrons, and he got into fistfights with patrons who would make racial insults. He claimed Duke Ellington and Bing Crosby as fans, and met many other jazz and pop greats including Bob Hope and Lena Horne.

Ching performed three shows a night, six nights a week at Forbidden City for more than twenty years. He left the club in 1961 after it was sold to a new owner, and retired from singing professionally. He raised a family, and took a job driving a delivery truck for local newspapers, where he was known to sing while making rounds. He retired from his truck route in 1985. Through the years, he continued to sing, at weddings, community events and occasional reunions of Forbidden City alumni.

=== Second career, June–July 2003 ===
In 1989 Ching was featured in Forbidden City U.S.A., a documentary film by Arthur Dong about the club. He sang at the premiere of the film at the Palace of Fine Arts, where he met Ben Fong-Torres, the former Rolling Stone writer and editor who was serving as one of the emcees for the event, alongside Ching's friend, TV anchor Emerald Yeh. Ching met Fong-Torres again several years later when both performed at Yeh's wedding reception.

Fong-Torres was impressed with Ching's singing and wanted to produce an album with him. Because of Fong-Torres' other commitments as an author and broadcaster, the record was not recorded until 2003, when Ching was 82. The album, Till the End of Time, features twelve songs recorded with a jazz trio led by pianist George Yamasaki, and four remastered songs Ching had recorded as demos in the 1940s. Co-produced by John Barsotti at San Francisco State University's studios, and released in June, 2003, it was a critical and financial success. Ching's story—and music—drew wide attention from local TV and radio stations, and the album made the Amazon charts. Ching and family, along with Forbidden City alumni, celebrated his CD at the Chinese Historical Society of America museum, and mayor Willie Brown proclaimed June 28, 2003 "Larry Ching Day". A week later, July 5, Ching died suddenly of an aneurysm.

Mr. Ching married twice, first to Vicki Ching, a dancer at Forbidden City who died in 1979, and second to Jane Seid Ching, whom he married in 1991. He had two sons and four stepsons. He is memorialized by a portrait on "Gold Mountain", a mural depicting Chinese contributions to American history on Romolo Place in North Beach.
