= Leo Koch =

American biologist

- Born: Leo Francis Koch; February 8, 1916; Dickinson, North Dakota
- Died: December 14, 1982 (aged 66)
- Education: University of Michigan
- Occupation: Biologist

Leo Francis Koch (February 8, 1916 – November 14, 1982) was an American academic. An Assistant Professor of biology at the University of Illinois, he was fired for promoting premarital sex.

== Early life ==
Leo Francis Koch was born on February 8, 1916, in Dickinson, North Dakota. He received a master's degree and a PhD in Biology from the University of Michigan.

== Career ==
Koch taught biology at the California State University, Fresno and California State University, Bakersfield. Later, he was an Assistant Professor of Biology at the University of Illinois.

In 1960, he wrote a letter to the Daily Illini defending premarital sex provoked public outrage in response to an article in the Daily Illini criticizing campus heavy petting parties. His response said in part:

...the events described are... symptoms of a serious social malaise... caused by the hypocritical and downright inhumane moral standards engendered by a Christian code... already decrepit in the age of Queen Victoria... With modern contraceptives and medical advice readily available... there is no valid reason why sexual intercourse should not be condoned among those sufficiently mature to engage in it without social consequences and without violating their own codes of morality and ethics. [...] A mutually satisfactory sexual experience would eliminate the need for many hours of frustrating petting and lead to happier and longer lasting marriages among our young men and women.

As a result, David Dodds Henry, the President of the University of Illinois, fired him. Henry called the letter "offensive and repugnant." The UI Board of Trustees supported Henry, as did Lyle H. Lanier, who served as the Dean of its College of Liberal Arts and Sciences, while the University of Illinois Senate voted to reprimand Koch but not to censure him. The firing and Koch's subsequent battle to be reinstated became a sensation in the press. Illinois was censured by the American Association of University Professors for the ouster. Koch appealed to the Illinois Supreme Court and the Supreme Court of the United States, which both refused to grant him a hearing.

Following his dismissal from Illinois, Koch met free love advocate Jefferson Poland, and together they founded the Sexual Freedom League in New York City.

According to reference below, he landed a position at Blake College, a small liberal arts school on the outskirts of Mexico City, where he edited Mushroom Digest, a bulletin on growing mushrooms. When he left the U of Illinois, he left behind all his plant research, including an incredible collection of more than 8,000 plant samples. With help from other experts around the country, U of I have identified much of the collection but a third of the liverworts and hornworts have not yet been identified.

== Personal life ==
Koch was married. He had two sons and a daughter.
