= Industrial Culture Handbook =

1983 book by V. Vale and Andrea Juno

RE/Search No. 6/7: Industrial Culture Handbook
- Editor: V. Vale
- Language: English
- Publication date: 1983

RE/Search No. 6/7: Industrial Culture Handbook from RE/Search Publications, 1983 is a book about industrial music and performance art edited by V. Vale and Andrea Juno. It features interviews and articles with Throbbing Gristle, Mark Pauline, Cabaret Voltaire, NON, Monte Cazazza, Sordide Sentimental, SPK, Z'EV, Johanna Went and Rhythm & Noise. The book was re-released in 2006 in a new hardback edition.

In his study on Throbbing Gristle's third album, Drew Daniel points out that the Handbook included extensive reference sections, which allowed the devotees to absorb the history of the bands and "the network of industrial music and noise radiating outwards of it."

Following these copious leads, I dutifully feasted on the laundry list of subcultural touchstones that seemed to come with the territory of industrial fandom, a kind of anti-Parnassus in which Charles Manson, John Wayne Gacy and Jim Jones rub shoulders with Aleister Crowley, William S. Burroughs and the Comte de Lautréamont.

— Drew Daniel, 20 Jazz Funk Greats
