= V. Vale =

American writer (born 1944)

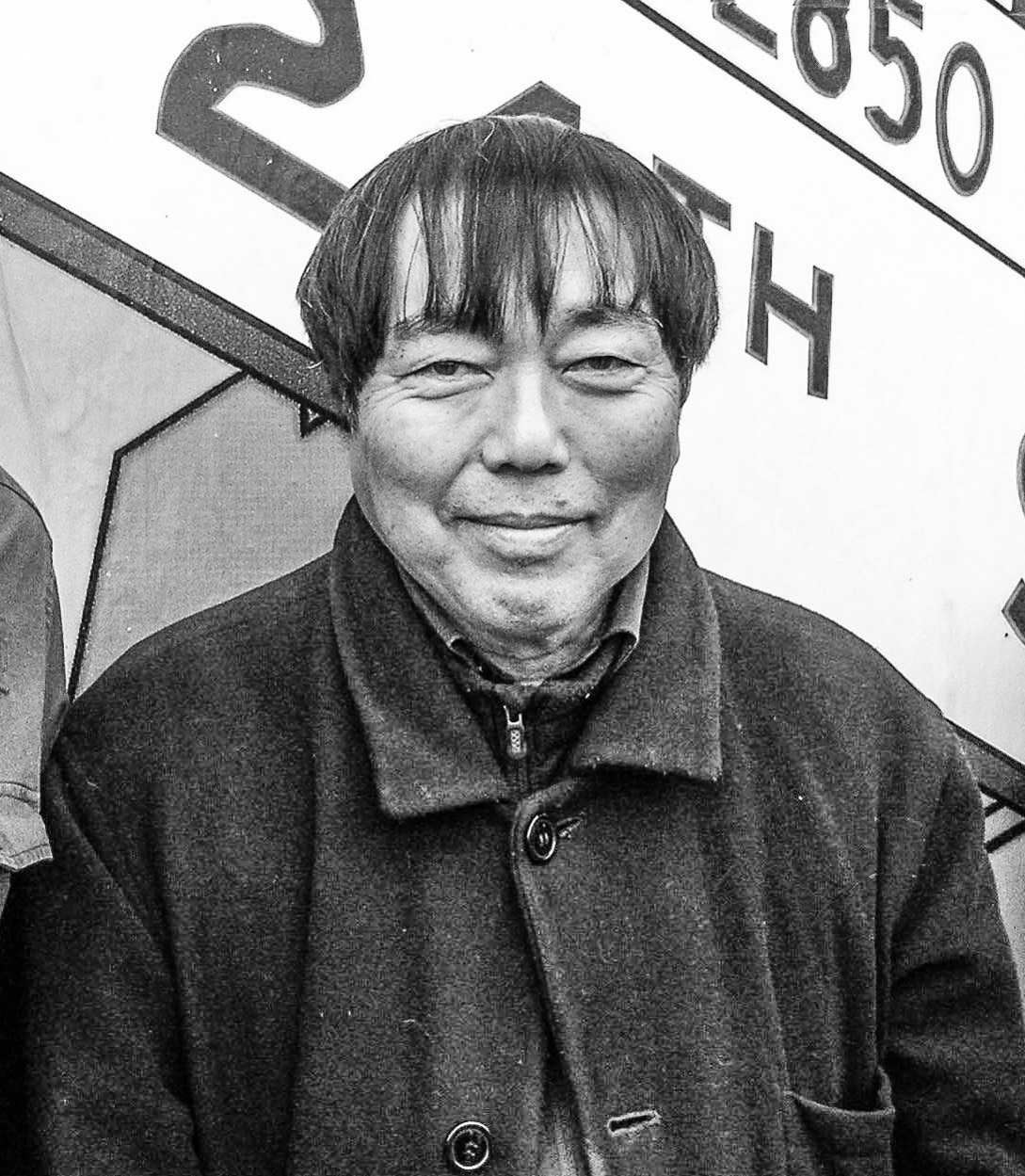
- Born: 4 February 1944 (age 82); Jerome War Relocation Center, Arkansas, United States
- Education: UC Berkeley
- Occupations: Writer, Independent Publisher
- Spouse: Marian Wallace
- Children: Valentine Marquesa Wallace
- Writing career
- Period: 1977–present
- Genres: Art, Music, Culture
- Notable works: Modern Primitives, Industrial Culture Handbook, Incredibly Strange Films
- Movements: Punk Rock Movement, Industrial Music
- Website: researchpubs.com

V. "Valhalla" Vale (born February 4, 1944) is an American editor, writer, interviewer, musician and, as Vale Hamanaka, was keyboardist for the initial configuration of Blue Cheer, before it became famous as a power trio. He is the publisher and primary contributor to books and magazines published by his company, RE/Search Publications. Vale is the host of the television talk show Counter Culture Hour on Public-access television cable TV channel 29 in San Francisco. The show is edited by his partner Marian Wallace. Vale is Japanese American.

== Early life ==
A third-generation Japanese American, Vale was born on February 4, 1944, at the Jerome War Relocation Center to actor Kiyoshi Conrad Hamanaka and Mary Takaoka of the Vaudeville group Taka Sisters (Myrtle, Mary, Midi). The Taka Sisters broke up after the murder of Vale's aunt Midi Taka in 1936. Vale has two younger half-sisters; musician/singer Lionelle Hamanaka, and children's author and illustrator Sheila Hamanaka.

By 1966 Vale received a bachelor's degree in English Literature at University of California, Berkeley and moved to Haight-Ashbury. In 1970, he moved to an apartment in North Beach, where he continues to live today.

== Publishing ==
In 1977, while working at City Lights Bookstore, with $100 donated each by Allen Ginsberg and Lawrence Ferlinghetti, he began publication of Search and Destroy, a San Francisco-based zine documenting the then-current punk subculture. In 1980, he began publication of RE/Search, a tabloid format zine focusing on various counterculture and underground topics, with financial help from Geoff Travis of Rough Trade Records and actress/film director Betty Thomas. At the same time he also started his own typesetting business, allowing for a day job to fund his publishing exploits and guaranteeing high quality typography and design for his magazines and books.

The 1980s saw the expansion of RE/Search books from tabloid-formatted zines to academically-modeled books. Vale published and contributed to many books on the subjects of pranks, obscure music and films, industrial culture, authors J. G. Ballard and William S. Burroughs, modern primitives, and many other underground topics. In 1991, Vale sold his typography business to focus on publishing full-time.

Vale, influenced by and well read in cultural anthropology, describes his focus for writing: (I have) "this weird theory that there's only 1000 interesting people on this planet that I refer to as primary source thinkers. It's my job to find them. I'm just after something that lasts longer, not 'high sugar fluff' as Henry Rollins put it. I want something I don't get right away. One of my favorite phrases, and I heard this from William Burroughs, is 'belief is the enemy of knowledge'."

Along with writing and distributing, Vale tours nationally giving talks about his career and provides guidance to DIY and Indie artists about book publishing. In 2012, Henry Rollins interviewed Vale at LA ZineFest.

=== Newsletter ===
As of 2017, both artist and musician Florian-Ayala Fauna and science fiction author Bruce Sterling are sponsors for V. Vale's RE/Search newsletter.

== Recordings ==
During the coronavirus pandemic, Vale began to record songs with his wife, Marian Wallace. He played the Yamaha spinet piano. Wallace sang and produced the songs. This resulted in a 12-track digital album, Lockdown Lullabies, was released in 2020. The album production was covered by the San Francisco Chronicle.

== Media ==
- Vale is featured in the 2016 nerd culture documentary Traceroute
- Vale is one of the interview subjects in William S. Burroughs: A Man Within.
