= Taka Sisters =

- Origin: California, United States
- Genres: Vaudeville
- Years active: 1930s
- Past members: Myrtle Taka; Midi Taka; Mary Taka

The Taka Sisters were a traveling vaudeville trio of Japanese-American singers and dancers who billed themselves as "the only Japanese triplets on the stage".

== Early years ==
Myrtle (1916-2011), Midi (1914-1936), and Mary (1912-1991) were the daughters of Issei Imahei Takaoka (a Christian minister and founder of the Hollywood Japanese Independent Church) and Kazuko Majime. Imahei died young from tuberculosis, leaving the family destitute and their son Hal Takaoka in charge. In their teens Myrtle got into show business as an extra. She convinced her sisters to go into vaudeville as the Taka Sisters, a risqué act of the time.

== Murder of Midi Takaoka ==
The Taka Sisters became nationally recognized but after headlining Harry’s New York Cabaret between 1935-1936 their careers ended abruptly after Midi Takaoka was murdered in Los Angeles at her family home on August 11, 1936 by Raymond Johnson, a jilted lover. The night before Johnson murdered Takaoka, he had beaten and stabbed William J. Bachand with an ice pick, the other man involved in the love triangle. Police were in pursuit of Johnson when the second crime was committed. Johnson turned himself in to the police two days later and confessed to the murder, saying he slashed her throat in a jealous rage after finding her with another Caucasian man.

Bachand had initially met Takaoka at a bus depot in New York, and he proposed marriage to her two days later with an engagement ring he purchased in St. Louis, even though she was already wearing an engagement ring from Johnson. The pair arrived in Los Angeles on August 7, where Takaoka told Johnson she was now involved with Bachand. After Bachand asked Takaoka's mother's permission to marry her, the pair traveled to Yuma to marry, but were denied by the authorities there. After returning to Los Angeles on August 10, Bachand testified that Johnson stabbed him five times with an ice pick that night and told him to leave Takaoka's house, where he was staying. Johnson was separated from Bachand by one of Takaoka's brothers, and Takaoka tearfully threatened to leave both men if they continued to fight. Bachand was taken to the hospital, where he was treated for his wounds, and returned to stay at the Takaoka home later that night. The next morning, on August 11, Johnson returned to confront Takaoka, and according to Bachand's recollection, he witnessed Johnson leaving the house at approximately 9 o'clock, followed by Takaoka, who collapsed on the front lawn.

Before a coroner's jury on August 14, Bachand testified that he and Takaoka had tried to marry in California and Arizona, but were denied due to anti-miscegenation laws. At the same inquest, Johnson stated he and Takaoka had been in a relationship for three years, but they could not marry because his estranged wife refused to grant him a divorce. Johnson was indicted on August 20 for the murder of Midi Takaoka and held without bail for trial. During the grand jury hearing, Johnson's confession was read in which he stated he had obtained a butcher knife from his workplace, a restaurant, and sharpened it while praying for strength. After waking Takaoka up in her bedroom the next day, he stated "I couldn't control myself any longer. I struck her many times on the head with a cold chisel and then slashed her across the throat with the butcher knife." Johnson was carrying a hatchet in his suitcase when he turned himself into the police, intending "to give [it] to Hal Takaoka, the dead girl's brother, so that Hal could cut him into little pieces for murdering his sister."

After his trial and conviction, Johnson was sentenced to life in prison for the murder on November 30, 1936, with the possibility of parole after five years. For his assault of Bachand, Johnson was also given a mandatory five-year sentence to be served consecutively. Johnson was later paroled in 1948 after serving twelve years at San Quentin. The murder of Midi Takaoka became widely publicized as a racial cautionary tale, which the Los Angeles Times summarized as a "tragic tale of the love of two occidentals for a sloe-eyed oriental dancer" and inspired the fate of the character Ida in the novel China Dolls.

== Wartime years ==
After Executive Order 9066 was issued in 1942, Mary Takaoka was sent to Jerome War Relocation Center while her sister Myrtle and brother Hal spent time in Manzanar. In 1944, V. Vale was born to Mary and Conrad Yama during their internment at Jerome.
