= Jadin Wong =

American singer

- Born: May 24, 1913; Stockton, California, U.S.
- Died: March 30, 2010 (aged 96) New York City, New York, U.S.
- Occupations: singer, dancer, actress, comedian
- Instruments: Body, hands, voice
- Years active: 1930s-2010

Jadin Wong (May 24, 1913 – March 30, 2010) was an American singer, dancer, actress, and comedian.

== Early life ==
Wong was born near Stockton, California, after which the family moved to San Francisco. She started singing in public at six years old. At age 16, she ran away to Hollywood to become a dancer. On the night she ran away, her mother secretly left some hard-earned cash for her to support herself, despite her father's objection .

Wong married three times. Her first husband was Li Sun from British Singapore, whom she divorced. She then married Edward Duryea Dowling. This second marriage was her longest marriage. More than a decade after Dowling's death, Wong married baseball champion Gil Chichester.

== Celebrity manager ==
Wong was a celebrity, diva, and grand dame who discovered John Lone. She performed ballet right into her 90s, where she was caught by an interviewing journalist doing splits and pirouettes as "morning exercise". She studied with Balanchine and trained in classical ballet and jazz.

== Professional life ==
Wong performed in Hong Kong, Paris, Cuba, Germany and New York during her younger days in Charlie Low's Forbidden City (nightclub).

Wong retired from performing on Broadway and cabaret comedy and went into theatrical agenting in the 1970s, creating the Jadin Wong Talent Management, where she cast for Bernardo Bertolucci and brought David Henry Hwang to fame with her theatrical connections. Clients included David Henry Hwang, John Lone, Joan Chen, Lou Diamond Phillips, Lucy Liu and Bai Ling.

== Awards ==
She was honored with a Lifetime Achievement Award at Lincoln Center, New York in winter of 2002. Her thank you speech quoted in The New York Times was, "Age is just a number, and I have an unlisted number." Ben Stiller has been quoted in the press as calling Jadin Wong the "original Dragon Lady", before Ziyi Zhang.

== WWII heroic commendations ==
Wong traveled extensively to entertain American troops during World War II.

She was recognized by President Ronald Reagan for her role in entertaining the nation's troops and by the U.S. House of Representatives for her cultural contributions to the nation. She was invited by President George Bush to the White House in 2004.

== Social life ==
Wong married into the blueblood family of New York theatre, the Chichesters, and the Jewish circle of playwrights and artists. Before Barbra Streisand became famous, Streisand was the opening act for Wong's show in New York. Streisand was subsequently replaced by Ben Stiller. Wong remains an honorary member of the Loews Theatre. She was featured in the New York Times in 2003 and 2004 as one of the most glamorous grand dames of New York.

== Later life ==
Wong was featured in Time, Newsweek and The New York Times. She resided in Manhattan and died at the age of 96.
