= The Chairman (1969 film) =

1969 film by J. Lee Thompson

- Theatrical release poster
- Directed by: J. Lee Thompson
- Screenplay by: Ben Maddow
- Based on: The Chairman; 1969 novel by Jay Richard Kennedy
- Produced by: Mort Abrahams; Arthur P. Jacobs
- Starring: Gregory Peck; Anne Heywood; Arthur Hill; Alan Dobie; Conrad Yama
- Cinematography: John Wilcox; Ted Moore (uncredited)
- Edited by: Richard Best
- Music by: Jerry Goldsmith
- Production company: APJAC Productions
- Distributed by: 20th Century Fox
- Release date: 25 June 1969
- Running time: 98 minutes
- Countries: United Kingdom; United States
- Language: English
- Budget: $4,915,000
- Box office: $2.5 million (US/ Canada rentals)

The Chairman (or alternatively The Most Dangerous Man in the World) is a 1969 spy film starring Gregory Peck. It was directed by J. Lee Thompson. The screenplay was by Ben Maddow based on a novel by Jay Richard Kennedy.

== Plot ==
A Western agent is sent to Communist China in order to retrieve an important agricultural enzyme. What he does not know is that there is a bomb implanted in his head; the forces behind his mission will detonate it if he fails to carry out the assignment.

Nobel Prize–winning university professor Dr. John Hathaway's mission begins with Lt. General Shelby's request at the U.S. embassy in London that he travel to China to visit Soong Li, a former professor of Hathaway's who has reportedly developed an enzyme that would permit crops to grow in any kind of climate. The hesitant Hathaway is further urged to go by a phone call from the President of the United States. Hathaway is concerned about the situation, as is a close female friend he knows named Kay in London.

A transmitter is implanted in Hathaway's skull as a tracking device. He is not informed that the device also includes an explosive element in case of emergency that can be triggered by the Americans if necessary. Neither the U.S. nor the Soviet Union wants the enzyme to remain exclusively in Chinese hands.

Shortly after his arrival in Hong Kong, Hathaway is sent to meet a beautiful young Chinese woman, Ting Ling, who introduces him to Security Chief Yin at a nightclub. When Hathaway returns to his hotel room, he finds Ting Ling waiting for him in his bed naked and enticing him to seduce her because it is her duty for the chairman. She tries to undress him, but when he hears a noise made by an intruder he goes to investigate. He apprehends a male intruder, but Ting Ling picks up a telephone and uses it to knock Hathaway unconscious. Security Chief Yin takes Hathaway by car to meet China's Party Chairman. They play a game of table tennis and discuss the enzyme, which the chairman claims he intends to share with the entire world. At this moment, Lt. General Shelby, who is listening in London, considers and discusses with his seniors the possibility of detonating the explosive device in Hathaway's head to kill the chairman.

Hathaway is then taken by plane to be reunited with Professor Soong Li and also meets Li's daughter, Soong Chu. No one thinks Hathaway is really spying on the Chinese regime. Soong Li, possibly betrayed by his daughter Soong Chu, is attacked by guards looking for the formula. Before he dies, Soong Li gives a book to Hathaway containing quotations from the chairman. The professor flees with the book and a piece of microfilm, trying to reach the Soviet border before Yin's men can capture him. He is unable to scale a fence, so Shelby elects to set off the explosive device, but Soviet border troops arrive at the last minute to help Hathaway cross safely.

Once safe, the professor discovers that the enzyme's formula is hidden in the chairman's book of quotations. He gets the device removed and is taken aback when it is demonstrated to him that it contained an explosive device that could have been detonated remotely at any time. He then returns to Kay in London.

== Cast ==
- Gregory Peck as Dr. John Hathaway
- Anne Heywood as Kay Hanna
- Arthur Hill as Shelby
- Alan Dobie as Benson
- Conrad Yama as the Chairman
- Zienia Merton as Ting Ling
- Ori Levy as Shertov
- Eric Young as Yin
- Burt Kwouk as Chang Shou
- Alan White as Gardner
- Keye Luke as Professor Soong Li
- Francesca Tu as Soong Chu
- Mai Ling as Flight Stewardess

== Production ==
Jay Richard Kennedy, who had written several novels and created the radio and television espionage show The Man Called X, became vice president of Sinatra Enterprises in 1966. He wrote a screenplay to star Frank Sinatra, Spencer Tracy and Yul Brynner. When the project didn't go ahead, Kennedy turned the aborted screenplay into a novel.

In July 1966, Richard Quine was going to make the film as part of a two-picture deal with Sinatra (the first was going to be an adaptation of Ernest Hemingway's Across the River to the Trees.) Neither project proceeded.

In April 1967, Arthur P. Jacobs picked up the project for 20th Century Fox. By August, Ben Maddow was writing the script with Sinatra to star Maddow was a leftist but called his assignment, "Just a job. It was just a melodrama, which they tried to make concurrent with the politics at the time. I didn't know anything about Mao, to tell the truth. Nobody else did really, either."

In June 1968, Gregory Peck was announced as star and Mort Abrahams as producer. Then J. Lee Thompson signed as director, thus reuniting the star and director of The Guns of Navarone in their fourth and final pairing.

Requests for permission to film in China were refused; the film was partly shot in Hong Kong until the production was ordered to leave due to protests by communists. (Jacobs says communists set off a fake bomb and warned that there would be a real one if The Chairman filmed there.) Thompson used guerrilla filmmaking to get Hong Kong location shots.

The film was shot in Taiwan, Snowdonia, Pinewood Studios and London. Although given second billing in the cast list, English actress Anne Heywood appears only at the start and end of the film for a total of five minutes.

Comparisons have been made between The Chairman and The Interview (2014).

== Release ==
For the British theatrical release, J. Lee Thompson was told that he must change the film's title to The Most Dangerous Man in the World, as most film-goers would mistakenly think that the film was about business.

=== Box office ===
According to Fox records, the film required $9,750,000 in theater revenue to break even. By 11 December 1970, however, the film had made just $5,425,000, resulting in a loss for the studio.

== Soundtrack ==
- The Chairman (Jerry Goldsmith album)

== See also ==
- List of American films of 1969
