= The Chairman (Jerry Goldsmith album) =

Studio album by Jerry Goldsmith
- Released: 1969

The Chairman is a 1969 Jerry Goldsmith album with reworkings of his music for the 1969 spy film, The Chairman, starring Gregory Peck.

After the original vinyl album was released in 1969, in conjunction with the film's release, the score debuted on CD in 1991, paired with Goldsmith's score to 1975's Ransom (aka The Terrorists) on the Silva Screen label. After that edition fell out of print, the score without the pairing of Ransom was re-issued on CD by Prometheus Records in 2005.

In 2025, Intrada Records released a re-recording of the complete score by the Royal Scottish National Orchestra conducted by William T. Stromberg.
