= Conrad Yama =

American actor

- Conrad Yama in Taking of Pelham One Two Three 1974
- Born: Kiyoshi Conrad Hamanaka; October 8, 1919; Fresno, California, U.S.
- Died: March 10, 2010 (aged 90)

Conrad Yama (born Kiyoshi Conrad Hamanaka; October 8, 1919 – March 10, 2010), was an American theatre, film, and television actor.

== Early life ==
Born and raised in Fresno, California, Hamanaka attended Fresno State after high school, studying speech and psychology. As a Nisei (2nd generation Japanese-American), Hamanaka was interned in Jerome, Arkansas during World War II due to Executive Order 9066, where he worked on camp newspapers. As a conscientious objector, Yama was also labeled a No-No Boy. While in the camp, one of his children caught pneumonia, and another contracted tuberculosis.

== Career ==
Upon his release, Hamanaka moved to Chicago, where, despite being accepted to study psychology at the University of Chicago, Hamanaka took the stage name Conrad Yama, and following a period of training at the Goodman Theatre, pursued an acting career. Some of Yama's first major credits were television appearances in Asian specific roles. Following tours of Teahouse of the August Moon and Auntie Mame, Yama made his first appearance on Broadway in the original production of Rodgers and Hammerstein musical Flower Drum Song as Dr. Li, and understudying Keye Luke in the character of Wang Chi Yang. Flower Drum Song was a significant musical because most of the Asian characters were played by Asian American actors, whereas white actors in yellowface makeup was the norm. His later Broadway credits included the musicals I Had a Ball and Pacific Overtures where he played a trio of roles. Yama also appeared in the dramatic play Plenty, both Off-Broadway, at The Public Theater, and on Broadway after the Public's production transferred. Off-Broadway, Yama originated roles in "Santa Anita '42" at both Playwrights Horizons and the Chelsea Theater, and in Frank Chin's The Year of the Dragon at The American Place Theatre. In the made-for-TV version of Year of the Dragon, broadcast by PBS as part of the series Great Performances in 1975, Yama returned as Pa Eng, the father of the protagonist, played by George Takei, who replaced Randall Duk Kim in the leading role. Yama's performance in Pacific Overtures was recorded when the entire production was taped and broadcast on Japanese television in 1976. Yama was also friends with comedian Severn Darden, and would appear in some of his late night comedy acts.

Due to his resemblance to Mao Zedong, Yama played Mao several times. Yama originated the part of Chairman Mao in Edward Albee's Box-Mao-Box, delivering authentic Mao quotations from the Little Red Book. The role was played by Wyman Pendleton during its brief Broadway run in 1968. One of Yama's largest movie parts was playing the title role, an unnamed Chairman Mao opposite Gregory Peck in The Chairman (1969), also known as "The Most Dangerous Man in the World". The New York Times review stated, "In the best scene of all, as the story moves into Chinese headquarters, Mr. Peck has an ideological Ping-Pong match, swatting it out verbally over a table with an incisive actor named Conrad Yama". To prepare for this scene, Peck and Yama received table tennis coaching by former British table tennis champion Johnny Leach. In a parody of this scene, Yama appeared as a Mao like figure for a Van Heusen shirt commercial, playing table tennis with a Van Heusen wearing American diplomat. Yama had another role similar to Chairman Mao when he portrayed the Chinese Prime Minister in "The Virgin President."

Yama's other onscreen acting included a number of small and supporting roles in film, television, and made for TV movies. His highlights include The King of Marvin Gardens (1972), The Taking of Pelham One Two Three (1974), and Midway (1976) as Admiral Nobutake Kondō. In The Godfather (1972), Yama played the fruit-seller during the Don Corleone shooting scene. Yama's last onscreen role was a small part in "See China and Die", a made-for-TV movie starring Esther Rolle in 1981.

== Family ==
Yama had three children. His oldest child and only son is the prominent San Francisco cultural figure, writer, and musician V. Vale. His oldest daughter is the New York City musician/singer Lionelle Hamanaka. Yama's youngest daughter is the noted children's author and illustrator Sheila Hamanaka.

When Yama acted alongside his friend Severn Darden in The Virgin President, his eldest daughter Lionelle Hamanaka also appeared with him onscreen in the part of the Prime Minister's daughter (credited as L'nelle Hamanaka). Lionelle was born after Yama was released from the camps following World War II. Because Yama withheld this from her, she only found out about internment in school. Lionelle wrote "Rohwer", a play based in part on her family's experiences which was presented as part of a series of plays about Japanese American internment by the Pan Asian Repertory Theatre. Yama was a fan of jazz, and Lionelle performs professionally as a jazz singer.

Yama died on March 10, 2010. Several years after his death, a picture of Yama (among other photographs) appeared on the cover of an academically published monograph collecting various profiles of Japanese Americans which has originally been featured in the Nichi Bei Times. His professional name "Yama" means "mountain" in Japanese.

== Filmography ==
Year	Title	Role	Notes
1969	The Chairman	The Chairman	
1969	The Virgin President	Chinese Prime Minister	
1972	The Godfather	Fruit Vendor	Uncredited
1972	The King of Marvin Gardens	Fujito	
1974	The Taking of Pelham One Two Three	Mr. Tomashita	
1976	Midway	Admiral Nobutake Kondō	
