= Sexual Freedom League =

1960s California swingers association

The Sexual Freedom League (SFL) was an organization founded in 1963 in New York City by Jefferson Poland and Leo Koch. It existed under the name New York City League for Sexual Freedom to promote and conduct sexual activity among its members and to agitate for political reform, especially for the repeal of laws against abortion and censorship, and had many female leaders.

== History ==
The 1960s were a growing time for a movement of "free-sex" in the face of controversy. Assistant professor of Biology Dr. Leo Koch had been fired by the University of Illinois in 1960 when he advocated premarital sex to students in a letter to The Daily Illini. In 1964, he and Jefferson Poland (then a student who was quoted as aspiring to be “either a lawyer or an agitator") founded the New York City League for Sexual Freedom. Poland eventually took his studies to Merritt Junior College in Oakland and soon focused his attention on doing a League in the Bay Area. In 1965, he and a few members of the "off-campus San Francisco Sexual Freedom League" waded naked into the ocean at Aquatic Park, a public beach in San Francisco, California; this saw them each arrested while Poland was sent to jail for five weekends. Various factions arose from the league (often in gender). Sam Sloan was president of the club at Berkeley between 1966–1967. Other organizations dedicated to collegiate sexual freedom would spring up across the country ranging from Stanford to Texas. Although formed as an activist group, it became known for sponsoring sex parties. In early 1966 Poland transferred the East Bay League to Richard Thorne, who proceeded to organize nude parties, which were thinly disguised sex orgies. The student chapter at UC Berkeley was named the "Campus Sexual Rights Forum", which would distribute information about sex ranging from abortion to contraception to go along with nude sit-ins and orgies. A raid in 1967 of a host for marijuana and alcohol possession presaged the end of the chapter, which had one last party on Christmas Eve of 1967.
