= Toy & Wing =

Asian American tap dance duo

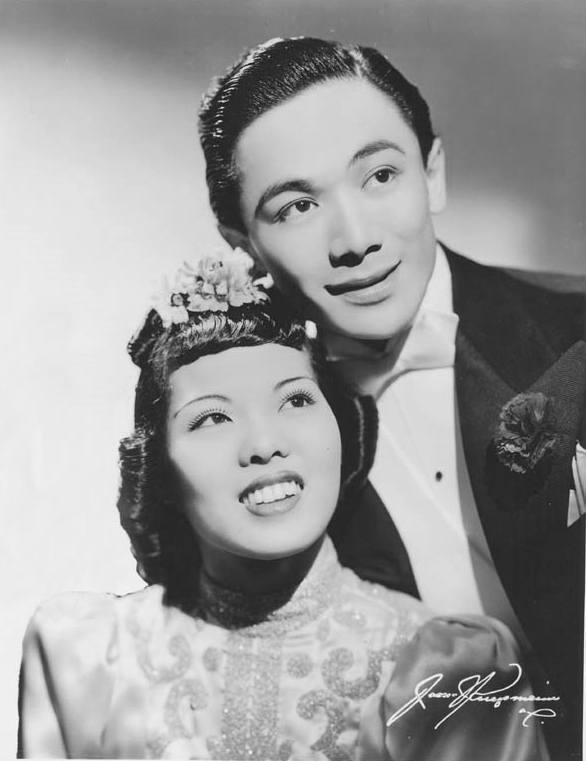
Toy & Wing, c. 1942

Toy & Wing were an American tap dance duo composed of Dorothy Toy (real name Shigeko Takahashi, May 28, 1917 – July 10, 2019) and Paul Wing (real name Paul Wing Jew, October 14, 1912 – April 27, 1997). They were billed as the "Chinese Fred Astaire and Ginger Rogers", though only Wing was Chinese-American; Toy was of Japanese descent.

Active in the 1930s and 1940s, they were the first Asian-Americans to enter the American tap dance scene. The pair married in 1940, mostly for convenience of booking and promotion, but later divorced. They continued dancing together after their separation. They were invited to participate in a film with Chico Marx, but were prevented because of Toy's Japanese heritage following the bombing of Pearl Harbor.

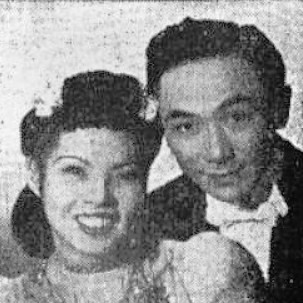
Toy & Wing

Dorothy Toy was born on May 28, 1917, in San Francisco to Yataro and Kiyo (née Sayama) Takahashi. She had a sister, Helen. After marrying Les Fong in 1952, her married name was Dorothy Toy Fong — they would later divorce. Following her dance career, Toy worked as a pharmaceutical technician and a dance instructor.

Toy turned 100 in May 2017. That same year, her career was memorialized in Dancing through Life: The Dorothy Toy Story, a film produced by Rick Quan in 2017. She died on July 10, 2019, at the age of 102 at her home in Oakland, California. She had two children, Peter and Dorlie.

Paul Wing was born October 14, 1912 in Menlo Park and raised in Palo Alto. He married his wife, Anna, in 1974. Wing served in World War II, taking part in the Normandy landings. He died in a care home in Yountville, California in April 1997 and was interred at Cypress Lawn Memorial Park.
