= List of books banned in New Zealand =

Book censorship has existed in New Zealand since the colonial period. Initially the majority of book censorship was carried out by the Customs Department, which had the authority to refuse entry to books considered indecent. As time went on more branches of government became involved with book censorship including the police, Post Office, courts, Executive Council, Cabinet, and the Department of Justice.

During the First and Second World War, there was significant censorship of literature considered seditious or otherwise contrary to the war effort. In 1963 the book censorship system was reformed. All previous restrictions on books were lifted and the Indecent Publications Tribunal was created, the first organization in New Zealand whose primary purpose was book censorship. Before this, there was no requirement for lists of banned books to be made public. By the end of the 1960s, the Tribunal had banned three books and almost 3000 comics and magazines.

The Indecent Publications Tribunal's treatment of homosexuality changed significantly as a result of the Homosexual Law Reform Act 1986. Before the Act, many books were banned solely on the basis that because consensual sex between men was a criminal offence in New Zealand, any publication that dealt with homosexuality was dealing with crime and was therefore indecent.

The Indecent Publications Tribunal was replaced by the Office of Film and Literature Classification in 1994 when the censorship system was reformed. Classifications given to books by the Indecent Publications Tribunal remain in effect unless they have been re-classified since.

As of September 2011, 1319 books have been banned and an additional 728 have been restricted in some way. More than two-thirds of banned or restricted books were classified before 1987.

This article contains lists of books, comics, librettos, and pamphlets that have had legal restrictions on importation, sale, possession, or exhibition in New Zealand.

== Before the Indecent Publications Tribunal (1841–1963) ==
The earliest New Zealand legislation solely for the purpose of censorship was the Offensive Publications Act 1892, although Customs regulations prohibiting the importation of indecent material had existed since 1858. The Offensive Publications Act outlawed "any picture or printed or written matter which is of an indecent, immoral, or obscene nature". In 1910 the Indecent Publications Act came into force, replacing earlier censorship legislation. The Act introduced the defence of literary, scientific, or artistic merit in a work. The purpose of this according to the Attorney-General John Findlay was to "protect the liberty which improves and ennobles a nation, while removing the licence which degrades".

Under the Customs Act 1913, any publication could be banned by an order of cabinet. In May 1921, following the First Red Scare, a cabinet directive came into force prohibiting "any document which incites, encourages, advises, or advocates violence, lawlessness, or disorder, or expresses any seditious intention". The Customs Department appointed a censor in July 1921 to deal with seditious publications. In 1922 it was decided that the role of the censor would be expanded to deal with indecent publications as well. The censor immediately released the majority of the novels on the Customs Department's banned list, except for most books about contraception.

The Customs Act 1913 prohibited the importation of all "indecent or obscene articles", which gave considerable discretionary power to the Customs Department as the terms "indecent" and "obscene" were not explicitly defined. The definition typically used by courts followed the Hicklin rule. This changed in 1939 when the High Court (Note: The High Court was called the Supreme Court until 1980.) considered factors such as literary merit and circumstances of publication in its ruling on The Decameron by Giovanni Boccaccio.

In 1923 the book Safe Marriage by Ettie Rout was banned to public outcry. As a result, a committee (Note: named the Censorship Appeal Board, later renamed to the Advisory Committee of Literature) was created to advise the Customs Department on book censorship. By the 1930s, the Customs Department's advisory committee had fallen into disuse. The committee was reinstated in February 1953 (Note: as the Literary Advisory Committee) and would last until 1963.

Published	Title	Author	Type	Banned by	Banned	Current status
1880	Nana	Émile Zola	Novel	Magistrate's Court	1890	Unrestricted
In 1888–89, publisher Henry Vizetelly was prosecuted in the United Kingdom for obscene libel for publishing translated works of Émile Zola. This led to an investigation into Zola's works by the Christchurch police in which detectives were sent to local bookshops to enquire after novels by Zola. Five men were arrested, prosecuted, and convicted for stocking indecent books. This was the first prosecution for indecent publications in a New Zealand court. One of the books, Nana, was also involved in the English case. All of the books were imported before the English case, and according to the defence counsel, copies of the books were available for sale in almost every New Zealand bookshop before the Vizetelly's prosecution in Britain.
1908	Five Nights	Victoria Cross	Novel	Magistrate's Court	1908	Unrestricted
1906	Six Women	Victoria Cross	Novel	Magistrate's Court	1908	Unrestricted
	The Yoke	Victoria Cross	Novel	Magistrate's Court	1908	Unrestricted
In 1908 bookshop Whitcomb & Tombs in Christchurch was prosecuted for selling works by Victoria Cross after a police detective was sent to purchase copies. The books were ruled indecent under the Offensive Publications Act 1892.
1899	The Interpretation of Dreams	Sigmund Freud	Non-fiction	Customs Department		Unrestricted
Allowed into the country only for professional use.
1886	The Perfumed Garden	translated by Sir Richard Francis Burton	Sex manual			Unrestricted
Banned before the Indecent Publications Act 1964. It was ruled not indecent in 1966.
1918	Wise Parenthood	Marie Stopes	Non-fiction	Customs Department		Unrestricted
1918	Married Love	Marie Stopes	Non-fiction	Customs Department		Unrestricted
1929	The Sexual Life of Savages in North-Western Melanesia	Bronisław Malinowski	Non-fiction	Customs Department		Unrestricted
Allowed to be imported "on the understanding that no guarantee is given that action will not be taken by the police if any offence in respect of them is subsequently committed under the Indecent Publications Act 1910".
1922–1927	My Life and Loves	Frank Harris	Autobiography			Unrestricted
Banned before the Indecent Publications Act 1964. Found not indecent by the IPT in 1967.
1903	Six Chapters in a Man's Life	Victoria Cross	Novel	Customs Department		Unrestricted
The book was on the Customs lists of prohibited books in 1921.
19th century	A Spar Love Affair	Guy de Maupassant	Fiction	Magistrate's Court	1917	Unrestricted
19th century	Stolen Sweets	Charles Paul de Kock	Fiction	Magistrate's Court	1917	Unrestricted
Found indecent in 1917 by a Magistrate's Court under the Indecent Publications Act 1910. The Magistrate S.E. McCarthy held the opinion that wide dissemination of the books "would tend to generate libidinous desires, and these desires not infrequently prove, for their unhappy victims, that broad highway which leads to the mental hospital, the gaol, and the premature grave."
1901	Damaged Goods	Eugène Brieux	Libretto	Customs Department	1917–1922	Unrestricted
Seized by Customs in 1917 for being indecent. Released in April 1922.
1913	Damaged Goods	adapted by Upton Sinclair	Novel	Customs Department	1921–1922	Unrestricted
Seized by Customs in 1921 for being indecent. Sinclair wrote to the Comptroller of Customs on 28 December 1921: "It is hard for me to believe that your government, which has the reputation of being one of the most liberal in the world, should bar serious educational writing upon the subject of venereal disease. My novel is merely a translation of the famous play by E. Brieux, which has been played in all the leading cities in America." The book was released in April 1922.
	The Wife's Handbook	Henry Arthur Allbutt	Sex manual	Customs Department	1921	Unrestricted
	How to Prevent Pregnancy	G. Hardy	Sex manual	Customs Department	1921	Unrestricted
1921	Over Life's Edge	Victoria Cross	Novel	Customs Department	1921	Unrestricted
1914	Sylvia's Marriage	Upton Sinclair	Novel	Customs Department	1921	Unrestricted
	La Vie Parisienne		Magazine		1921	Unrestricted
1921	The Thing	Gertie de S. Wentworth-James	Novel		1921	Unrestricted
1922	Safe Marriage	Ettie Rout	Non-fiction	Customs Department	1923	Unrestricted
The book advocated the use of contraception in marriage. It was banned in 1923 to public outcry ultimately leading to the creation of a committee to advise Customs on book censorship. By 1930, the ban had been reversed.
	One Thousand and One Nights	translated by the Casanova Society	Collection of folklore	Customs Department		Unrestricted
Restricted to students of anthropology and ethnology.
1926	The Butcher Shop	Jean Devanny	Novel	Customs Department	1926	Unrestricted
The first New Zealand novel to be banned. In March 1926, the Prime Minister's secretary received correspondence from London that described the book as "disgusting indecent communistic", and in April that year Customs was advised to ban it: "The Board considers this a bad book all round – sordid, unwholesome and unclean. It makes evil to be good. We are of the opinion that it should be banned."
1928	Lady Chatterley's Lover	D. H. Lawrence	Novel	Customs Department		Unrestricted
Appeared on the Customs Department's list of banned books. It was found not indecent by the Indecent Publications Tribunal in 1965.
1935	A Handbook of Marxism	Emile Burns	Non-fiction	Customs Department		Unrestricted
Banned by 1935.
1928	The Well of Loneliness	Radclyffe Hall	Novel	Customs Department	1929	Unrestricted
	The Hindu Art of Love		Non-fiction	Customs Department	1929	Unrestricted
1934	Tropic of Cancer	Henry Miller	Autobiographical novel	Customs Department		Unrestricted
1939	Tropic of Capricorn	Henry Miller	Autobiographical novel	Customs Department		Unrestricted
1940	The World of Sex	Henry Miller	Novel	Customs Department		Unrestricted
1949–1960	The Rosy Crucifixion	Henry Miller	Autobiographical novel	Customs Department		Unrestricted
1953	Plexus	Henry Miller	Autobiographical novel	Customs Department		Unrestricted
1956	Quiet Days in Clichy	Henry Miller	Autobiographical novella	Customs Department		Unrestricted
1960	Nexus	Henry Miller	Autobiographical novel	Customs Department		Unrestricted
Henry Miller novels were on the Customs Department's list of banned books for periods between 1934 and 1964. Found not indecent by the IPT in 1967.
1832–1837	Droll Stories	Honoré de Balzac	Collection of short stories	Customs Department; Magistrate's Court		Unrestricted
On the Customs Department's list of prohibited books. Eventually removed. Banned by a Magistrate's Court in 1935.
	Smokehouse Monthly		Magazine	Customs Department	1937	Unrestricted
The August 1937 edition of Smokehouse Monthly was banned for being indecent.
	Ace G Men		Pulp fiction	Customs Department	1938	Unrestricted
	Breezy Stories		Pulp fiction	Customs Department	1938	Unrestricted
	Real Detective		Pulp fiction	Customs Department	1938	Unrestricted
	Wu Fang		Pulp fiction	Customs Department	1938	Unrestricted
	Shadow		Pulp fiction	Customs Department	1938	Unrestricted
	True Confessions		Pulp fiction	Customs Department	1938	Unrestricted
	Intimate Romances		Pulp fiction	Customs Department	1938	Unrestricted
	Doc Savage		Pulp fiction	Customs Department	1938	Unrestricted
	Dime Detective		Pulp fiction	Customs Department	1938	Unrestricted
	Candid Confessions		Pulp fiction	Customs Department	1938	Unrestricted
	Actual Detective		Pulp fiction	Customs Department	1938	Unrestricted
	Your Body		Pulp fiction	Customs Department	1938	Unrestricted
	Foto Crime		Pulp fiction	Customs Department	1938	Unrestricted
	Spicer		Pulp fiction	Customs Department	1938	Unrestricted
Among the 300,000 American pulp magazines seized by Customs in 1938 for glorifying violence.
14th century	The Decameron	Giovanni Boccaccio	Collection of novellas	Magistrate's Court	1939–1939	Unrestricted
In 1939 a policeman borrowed The Decameron from a private lending library. He was shocked by its contents and had a court case brought against the owner of the club. The Magistrate's Court found the book to be indecent by the Hicklin rule. Later the same year, the High Court abandoned the Hicklin rule and overturned the finding that it was indecent. The Supreme Court gave greater weight to the circumstances of the book's publication and its artistic merit. It was the first case in New Zealand of evidence of a publication's literary merit being heard in court.
For books banned during World War II, see § World War II (1939–1945).
1944	Forever Amber	Kathleen Winsor	Novel	Customs Department	1945	Unrestricted
Banned by Minister of Customs Walter Nash for giving undue prominence to sex. The ban was implemented through import licence regulations which meant that private imports were not prohibited. The New Zealand Library Association objected to the ban, arguing that import licensing regulations could be used to place an uncontestable ban on any imported publication.
1947	For the Rest of Our Lives	Dan Davin	Novel	Customs Department		Unrestricted
1933	Psychology of Sex	Havelock Ellis	Medical textbook	Customs Department	1946	Unrestricted
	Encyclopedia of Sex Practice		Medical textbook	Customs Department	1946	Unrestricted
1934	Birth Control Today	Marie Stopes	Medical textbook	Customs Department	1946	Unrestricted
1949	"Intimacy"	Jean-Paul Sartre	Short story	Customs Department		Unrestricted
Allowed to be imported on the understanding that there was no guarantee that police might not prosecute at a later date.
1922	Ulysses	James Joyce	Novel	Customs Department	1950	Unrestricted
Allowed to be imported on the condition that it would be sold "only to members of the educational profession and bona fide students of literature, and on the understanding that no guarantee is given that action will not be taken by the police if any offence in respect of them is subsequently committed under the Indecent Publications Act, 1910."
1955	Boss of Britain's Underworld	Billy Hill	Memoir	Department of Justice	1956	Unrestricted
Deemed indecent in 1956 for encouraging lawlessness. The Minister of Justice stated publicly in 1956 that anyone selling the book would be prosecuted and any copies that were imported would be seized by the Customs Department. Banned by the Ministry of Justice in 1959.
1950	My Gun Is Quick	Mickey Spillane	Novel	Department of Justice	1955	Unrestricted
1950	Vengeance Is Mine!	Mickey Spillane	Novel	Department of Justice	1955	Unrestricted
1951	One Lonely Night	Mickey Spillane	Novel	Department of Justice	1955	Unrestricted
1951	The Long Wait	Mickey Spillane	Novel	Department of Justice	1955	Unrestricted
1951	The Big Kill	Mickey Spillane	Novel	Department of Justice	1955	Unrestricted
1952	Kiss Me, Deadly	Mickey Spillane	Novel	Department of Justice	1955	Unrestricted
1950	Lay Her Among the Lilies	James Hadley Chase	Novel	Department of Justice	1955	Unrestricted
1951	Strictly for Cash	James Hadley Chase	Novel	Department of Justice	1955	Unrestricted
1952	The Fast Buck	James Hadley Chase	Novel	Department of Justice	1955	Unrestricted
1953	This Way for a Shroud	James Hadley Chase	Novel	Department of Justice	1955	Unrestricted
1953	I'll Bury My Dead	James Hadley Chase	Novel	Department of Justice	1955	Unrestricted
Banned by the Department of Justice with the cooperation of Associated Booksellers of New Zealand.
1900–	Health and Efficiency		Magazine	Customs Department	1957	Unrestricted
Customs allowed nudist clubs to import the magazine on the condition that "misuse of club copies would result in action under the Indecent Publications Act, 1910."
1933	God's Little Acre	Erskine Caldwell	Novel	Customs Department		Unrestricted
1957	Mandingo	Kyle Onstott	Novel	Customs Department; Department of Justice	1959	Unrestricted
In late 1959, the Secretary for Justice informed the booksellers that the Justice Department considered Mandingo indecent. It would eventually be on the Customs Department's and the Justice Department's list of prohibited books. It was found not indecent by the IPT in 1965.
1958	Borstal Boy	Brendan Behan	Autobiography	Customs Department	1958	Unrestricted
Banned by Customs without consultation with the Literary Advisory Committee. The book was referred to the Committee after its ban was queried by Associated Booksellers of New Zealand. By August 1959, the book was permitted for special orders and was not allowed to be displayed to the public.
1947	You Can't See 'Round Corners	Jon Cleary	Novel	Department of Justice	1959	Unrestricted
In January 1959, the Department of Justice informed the book's Australian publisher that it would be considered indecent in New Zealand, although the book had already been circulating in the country and stocked in public libraries for many years.
1955	Lolita	Vladimir Nabokov	Novel	Customs Department; Supreme Court; Court of Appeals	1959	Unrestricted
Banned in 1955 by Customs, disregarding the Literary Advisory Committee's recommendation that it should be available for restricted sale. The decision was challenged by the New Zealand Council for Civil Liberties. The High Court ruled the book indecent for having an undue emphasis on sex that would corrupt the reader. The ruling was upheld by the Court of Appeal in a 2–1 decision. Lolita was found not indecent by the Indecent Publications Tribunal in 1964.
1959	A Way of Love	James Courage	Novel			Unrestricted
"The novel was banned under the censorship provisions in place before the setting up of the Indecent Publications Tribunal in 1964."
1791	Justine	Marquis de Sade	Novel	Indecent Publications Tribunal		Unrestricted
Banned before the Indecent Publications Act 1964. In 1965 the Indecent Publications Tribunal restricted it to "psychologists, psychiatrists, and adult bona fide students of literature or philosophy". However, in 1994 a collection of three de Sade novels including Justine was ruled as not indecent.

=== World War I period (1914–1920) ===
During World War I, power was given to the New Zealand Defence Force and later to the Customs Department to prohibit the importation of literature that was considered undesirable, usually for being seditious. Wartime censorship of books and letters continued for many months after the end of the war.

Published	Title	Author	Type	Banned by	Banned	Current status
	works of the Industrial Workers of the World			Executive Council	1915	Unrestricted
Importation of any printed matter from the Industrial Workers of the World (IWW) was prohibited by an Order in Council on 20 September 1915. This included the newspapers Direct Action and Solidarity. Sale of all IWW works was prohibited by a Gazette notice on 30 November 1917.
	Gaelic Magazine			Executive Council	1917	Unrestricted
Importation was prohibited by an Order in Council in 1917.
	Rome's hideous guilt		Pamphlet		1919	Unrestricted
1920	Programme of the World Revolution	Nikolai Bukharin	Pamphlet			Unrestricted
In 1920 future prime minister Walter Nash, a bookseller at the time, was arrested and fined £12 for importing Programme of the World Revolution.
1898–	Jane's Fighting Ships	John Frederick Thomas Jane	Reference book			Unrestricted
	The World's Warships	John Frederick Thomas Jane	Reference book	Minister of Defence	1915	Unrestricted
	Warships at a Glance	John Frederick Thomas Jane	Reference book	Minister of Defence	1915	Unrestricted
	Naval Recognition Book	John Frederick Thomas Jane		Minister of Defence	1915	Unrestricted
	Fleets of the World			Minister of Defence	1915	Unrestricted
	The Naval Pocket-book			Minister of Defence	1915	Unrestricted
Sale of these books was prohibited on 17 November 1915 under the War Regulations Act 1914.
	International Socialist Review			Minister of Defence	1916	Unrestricted
	The Fatherland			Minister of Defence	1916	Unrestricted
	Issues and Events			Minister of Defence	1916	Unrestricted
	all American newspapers and periodicals printed in the German language			Minister of Defence	1916	Unrestricted
Sale of these periodicals was prohibited on 29 February 1926 under the War Regulations Act 1914.
	Atlanta American		Periodical	Governor of the Dominion of New Zealand	1916	Unrestricted
1906–1939	Atlanta Georgian		Newspaper	Governor of the Dominion of New Zealand	1916	Unrestricted
1904–1961	Boston American		Newspaper	Governor of the Dominion of New Zealand	1916	Unrestricted
1900–1939	Chicago American		Newspaper	Governor of the Dominion of New Zealand	1916	Unrestricted
1907–1918	Chicago Examiner		Newspaper	Governor of the Dominion of New Zealand	1916	Unrestricted
1903–1962	Los Angeles Examiner		Newspaper	Governor of the Dominion of New Zealand	1916	Unrestricted
1873–1931	Los Angeles Herald		Newspaper	Governor of the Dominion of New Zealand	1916	Unrestricted
	Morgan Journal		Periodical	Governor of the Dominion of New Zealand	1916	Unrestricted
1901–1937	New York American		Newspaper	Governor of the Dominion of New Zealand	1916	Unrestricted
	New York Deutsches Journal		Periodical	Governor of the Dominion of New Zealand	1916	Unrestricted
1895–1937	New York Evening Journal		Newspaper	Governor of the Dominion of New Zealand	1916	Unrestricted
	San Francisco Examiner		Newspaper	Governor of the Dominion of New Zealand	1916	Unrestricted
	San Francisco Sunday American		Periodical	Governor of the Dominion of New Zealand	1916	Unrestricted
	Sunday Georgian		Periodical	Governor of the Dominion of New Zealand	1916	Unrestricted
1886–	Cosmopolitan		Magazine	Governor of the Dominion of New Zealand	1916	Unrestricted
1885–	Good Housekeeping		Magazine	Governor of the Dominion of New Zealand	1916	Unrestricted
1867–	Harper's Bazaar		Magazine	Governor of the Dominion of New Zealand	1916	Unrestricted
	Hearst's Magazine		Magazine	Governor of the Dominion of New Zealand	1916	Unrestricted
1903–	Motor		Magazine	Governor of the Dominion of New Zealand	1916	Unrestricted
	Motor Boating Magazine		Periodical	Governor of the Dominion of New Zealand	1916	Unrestricted
	Ross's Magazine		Periodical	Governor of the Dominion of New Zealand	1916	Unrestricted
	Bull		Illustrated newspaper	Governor of the Dominion of New Zealand	1916	Unrestricted
22 periodicals were prohibited by an Order in Council on 21 December 1916.
	The Black Prophet	Guy Fitch Phelps		Attorney-General	1918	Unrestricted
The Black Prophet and any publications containing extracts of The Black Prophet were prohibited by an Order in Council on 28 June 1918.
1916	Green Ray		Newspaper	Attorney-General	1918	Unrestricted
Green Ray was an Irish nationalist newspaper founded in late 1916. It was prohibited by and Order in Council on 3 July 1918. The Order also prohibited every future edition and any substitute newspaper with the same proprietor, publisher, printer, or editor.
	Gold for Iron	Fellowship of Reconciliation	Pamphlet	Attorney-General	1918	Unrestricted
Prohibited by an Order in Council on 19 July 1918.
1919	Novi Svijet	Jugo-Slav Publishing Company	Journal	Attorney-General	1919	Unrestricted
Novi Svijet was a newspaper founded in May 1919 by Slavs in Auckland. On 6 June 1919 it prohibited by an Order in Council for being "injurious to the public interest in respect to the present war". It was prohibited after an open letter in Croatian had been found to be unfavourable to the National Service Regulations. The Attorney-General Francis Bell told the complainants that he had considered a prosecution, as the newspaper "contained matter calculated to excite discontent and disobedience among the Slavs [and] printed in English an article inciting treason and disloyalty in Ireland". Several months later the newspaper obtained permission to publish in English and changed its name to its English equivalent, New World. The newspaper failed to sell in this form, and applied for permission to publish half in Dalmatian. This request was refused.
	Grey River Argus		Newspaper			Unrestricted
Grey River Argus was fined £25 in 1920 for "publishing a letter from a correspondent saying it was futile to believe the capitalist class would tamely submit to being legalised out of existence".
1910	War: What For?	George Ross Kirkpatrick	Non-fiction		1920	Unrestricted
Withheld by Customs in 1920 although it had been distributed in the country previously.
	Socialism in Queensland	Joseph King	Pamphlet		1920	Unrestricted
1919	Soviets and the Soviet Government	Joseph King	Pamphlet		1920	Unrestricted
1919	Bolsheviks and Bolshevism	Joseph King	Pamphlet		1920	Unrestricted
1919	Prospect and Retrospect	Philip Snowden	Pamphlet		1920	Unrestricted
1919	The Coming Crash	J.W. Newbald	Non-fiction		1920	Unrestricted
1918	The Gang Behind the Government, or Capital's Case for Industrial Unionism	J.W. Newbald	Essay		1920	Unrestricted
1919	The Hidden Hand in Politics	J.W. Kneeshaw	Pamphlet		1920	Unrestricted
1919	The Allies' Crime against Russia	A.W. Humphrey	Pamphlet		1920	Unrestricted
1919	Capitalist Russia and Socialist Russia	Philips Price	Non-fiction		1920	Unrestricted
1919	Why Good Men Go Wrong in War	Richard Lee	Pamphlet		1920	Unrestricted
Barred by Customs from entering New Zealand in 1920.
	The Communist Programme		Pamphlet			Unrestricted
Some time before May 1921, a man was sentenced to three months' hard labour for selling copies of The Communist Programme.
	Red Europe	Frank Anstey	Non-fiction			Unrestricted
Banned by the Reform Government according to Opposition MP Harry Holland.
	Money and Power	Frank Anstey	Non-fiction			Unrestricted
1825–1994	Anti-Slavery Reporter	Zachary Macaulay	Periodical		1915	Unrestricted
Confiscated from pacifist Charles Mackie in November 1915, alongside a carton of 500 leaflets from the British Stop the War Committee and a batch of suffragist material.

=== World War II (1939–1945) ===
Censorship of books, pamphlets, newspapers, telegraph, radio, mail, and public speech was extensive during World War II. Censorship regulations were drafted in September 1938 during the Munich Agreement and were brought into force on 1 September 1939. They established the Controller of Censorship, responsible for postal and telegraph censorship, and the Director of Publicity, responsible for press censorship. These two roles were created to prevent dissemination of prejudicial information and subversive reports.

The Controller of Censorship had the power to "cause any postal packet to be opened, detained, or delayed", and many books were detained under the Controller's direction. Books were withheld for various reasons, including interfering with the war effort, having ties to communism, and being likely to cause strong sectarian strife or bitterness. Some innocuous books were withheld if they were in the same packages as suspected books.

In correspondence between the Controller of Censorship George McNamara and the Prime Minister Peter Fraser about the communist and pacifist literature entering the country by post, McNamara said

The volume is fairly heavy and is continuous. As most of it is definitely antagonistic to British ideals and of a subversive character, it is being detained, but some may be reaching the country in larger packages as cargo. All of it is aimed at converting our people to Communism or other isms, and is definitely against the war effort.

— Controller of Censorship George McNamara

The list of banned books was never made public during the war and was generally kept secret, to the frustration of libraries and booksellers. Reluctant to waste their already restricted budgets and risk their import licences, libraries and booksellers avoided importing books they thought might be withheld, and librarians began to remove books considered dangerous to the common good during wartime. By 1940 the number of intercepted and withheld books had become substantial. Minister of Customs Walter Nash, having been a bookseller's agent, had a special interest in books and took charge of this branch of censorship. Nash created an ad hoc committee to advise the Controller of Censorship on which books should be released, with the intention of releasing as many as possible. Throughout the war, this committee made the majority of decisions in secret about the entry of books into the country.

The Censorship and Publicity Emergency Regulations were revoked on 6 September 1945.

Published	Title	Author	Type	Banned by	Banned	Current status
	The New Communist Manifesto		Pamphlet	Customs Department	1930s	Unrestricted
	The World Trade Union Movement		Pamphlet	Customs Department	1930s	Unrestricted
Banned in the 1930s for advocating violence, lawlessness, or disorder or expressing seditious intention.
1940	Karl Marx in his Earlier Writings	H. P. Adams		Controller of Censorship	−1940	Unrestricted
1917	Freedom Calling, the Story of the Secret German Radio		Pamphlet	Controller of Censorship	−1940	Unrestricted
1917	Rebels and Reformers	Arthur Ponsonby; Dorothea Ponsonby		Controller of Censorship	−1940	Unrestricted
1940	Rosa Luxemburg	Paul Frölich		Controller of Censorship	−1940	Unrestricted
1940	Karl Marx	Leon Trotsky		Controller of Censorship	−1940	Unrestricted
1940	India Today	R. Palme Dutt		Controller of Censorship	−1940	Unrestricted
Withheld for having a connection to communism; released in October 1940 following the first report of the advisory committee to the Controller of Customs. Karl Marx in his Earlier Writings was released again in May 1941, having been on the Controller of Censorship May 1941 list of banned books.
1940	War and the Labour Movement	Harry Pollitt		Controller of Censorship	1940	Unrestricted
1940	The War Crisis	William Z. Foster		Controller of Censorship	1940	Unrestricted
1940	Is this a War for Freedom?	Ernst Fischer		Controller of Censorship	1940	Unrestricted
1940	Social Democracy and the War	V. I. Jerome		Controller of Censorship	1940	Unrestricted
Banned in October 1940 on the grounds of being anti-imperialist propaganda and supporting trade union opposition to the war.
	Soviets Today		Periodical	Controller of Censorship	1940	Unrestricted
	Moscow News		Periodical	Controller of Censorship	1940	Unrestricted
	Labour Monthly		Periodical	Controller of Censorship	1940	Unrestricted
	Communist International		Periodical	Controller of Censorship	1940	Unrestricted
	New Masses		Periodical	Controller of Censorship	1940	Unrestricted
Banned in October 1940 for advocating the Russian regime.
	What Every Young Man Should Know About War	H. R. Shapiro		Controller of Censorship	1940	Unrestricted
Banned in October 1940 for being pacifist anti-war propaganda.
1939	The Land of Socialism Today and Tomorrow: Reports and Speeches at the 18th Congress of the Communist Party of the Soviet Union (Bolsheviks), March 10–21, 1939	Communist Party of the Soviet Union		Controller of Censorship		Unrestricted
1940	Soviet Foreign Policy, the Meaning of the War in Finland	Vyacheslav Molotov		Controller of Censorship		Unrestricted
Withheld and held for decision by a higher authority.
1938	Questions and Answers on Communism	J. R. Campbell		Controller of Censorship	−1942	Unrestricted
Withheld in 1939 or 1940 and held for decision by a higher authority in October 1940; banned in May 1941. Released in November 1942.
1938	Truth and Mr Chamberlain	Steven MacGregor		Controller of Censorship		Unrestricted
1928	Falsehood in War-Time	Arthur Ponsonby		Controller of Censorship		Unrestricted
Withheld from circulation in 1939 or 1940 and held for decision by a higher authority in October 1940; later banned in May 1941. In November 1942, the ban remained in place.
1847	The Communist Manifesto	Karl Marx; Friedrich Engels		Controller of Censorship	−1942	Unrestricted
Withheld and held for decision by a higher authority; still held by Customs in June 1942. It was a set book at Victoria University of Wellington in 1941, but the university's students were not allowed to access it. It was released in November 1942.
1847	The Poverty of Philosophy	Karl Marx		Controller of Censorship		Unrestricted
1875	Critique of the Gotha Programme	Karl Marx		Controller of Censorship		Unrestricted
1917	The State and Revolution	Vladimir Lenin		Controller of Censorship		Unrestricted
1917	Imperialism, the Highest Stage of Capitalism	Vladimir Lenin		Controller of Censorship		Unrestricted
	Religion	Vladimir Lenin		Controller of Censorship		Unrestricted
1917	Letters from Afar	Vladimir Lenin		Controller of Censorship		Unrestricted
Withheld and held for decision by a higher authority in 1939 or 1940.
	works of the Jehovah's Witnesses			Customs Department	1940	Unrestricted
In October 1940 the Jehovah's Witnesses was declared a subversive organisation. In November 1940 all literature by the Jehovah's Witnesses' was banned for being subversive.
1941	An Autobiography	Jawaharlal Nehru	Autobiography	Controller of Censorship	−1941	Unrestricted
1937	Adolescent Psychology	A. H. Arlitt		Controller of Censorship	−1941	Unrestricted
1940	Lust for Life	Irving Stone		Controller of Censorship	−1941	Unrestricted
1940	Modern Marriage and Birth Control	E. F. Griffith		Controller of Censorship	−1941	Unrestricted
1939	The Children we Teach	Susan Isaacs		Controller of Censorship	−1941	Unrestricted
1933	Towards the Understanding of Karl Marx	S. Hook		Controller of Censorship	−1941	Unrestricted
1939	Culture and the People	Maxim Gorki		Controller of Censorship	−1941	Unrestricted
1938	Why You Should Be a Socialist	John Strachey		Controller of Censorship	−1941	Unrestricted
1940	Revolt on the Clyde	Willie Gallacher		Controller of Censorship	−1941	Unrestricted
1937	Post-War History of the British Working Class	Allen Hutt		Controller of Censorship	−1941	Unrestricted
1940	Is this an Imperialist War?	Harold Laski		Controller of Censorship	−1941	Unrestricted
1937	Soviet Communism	Sidney Webb; Beatrice Webb		Controller of Censorship	−1941	Unrestricted
Released in August 1941.
	Daily Worker			Controller of Censorship		Unrestricted
Released following the termination of the Molotov–Ribbentrop Pact in June 1941.
1939	We Will Not Cease	Archibald Baxter		Controller of Censorship	1941	Unrestricted
Banned in August 1941 for being pacifist and anti-war.
	works of the British Central Board for Conscientious Objectors			Controller of Censorship	1941	Unrestricted
All publications from the British Central Board for Conscientious Objectors were banned in August 1941.
1940	Leninism	Joseph Stalin		Controller of Censorship	1941	Unrestricted
Banned in August 1941.
	Lenin on Religion			Controller of Censorship		Unrestricted
Banned for being pacifist.
1940	Industrial History in Wartime	Wal Hannington		Controller of Censorship	−1942	Unrestricted
	Twenty Years	Willie Gallacher		Controller of Censorship		Unrestricted
	British Trade Unionism, A Short History	Allen Hutt		Controller of Censorship	−1942	Unrestricted
In June 1942, the Collector of Customs informed the Progressive Book Society of Auckland of a number of books that were being held, including Twenty Years, Industrial History in Wartime, British Trade Unionism, a short history (which had been banned by April 1941), two books by Stalin on Leninism, and five books by Lenin. Industrial History in Wartime and British Trade Unionism were released in November 1942.
1942	What Will It Be Like?	Richard Acland		Controller of Censorship		Unrestricted
1941	Guide to the New World; a handbook of Constructive World Revolution	H. G. Wells		Controller of Censorship		Unrestricted
Withheld from Wellington booksellers according to a 19 March 1942 House of Commons question from MP J. A. Lee.
	works of Lenin and Stalin			Controller of Censorship	−1942	Unrestricted
All works of Lenin and Stalin were released in November 1942.
1940	Hands off the Daily Worker	J. B. S. Haldane		Controller of Censorship	−1942	Unrestricted
1940	British Liberty in Danger	Ronald Kidd		Controller of Censorship	−1942	Unrestricted
	Britain and Russia	W. Holmes		Controller of Censorship	−1942	Unrestricted
1940	Revolution for Socialism	Pat Sloan		Controller of Censorship	−1942	Unrestricted
1940	Russia and the League of Nations	Pat Sloan		Controller of Censorship	−1942	Unrestricted
1938	Political and Social Doctrines of Communism	R. Palme Dutt		Controller of Censorship	−1942	Unrestricted
1941	Serving y Time	Harry Pollitt		Controller of Censorship	−1942	Unrestricted
Released in 1942 after being withheld by the Controller of Censorship.
1916–1919	C. O.'s Hansard	Central Board for Conscientious Objectors		Controller of Censorship		Unrestricted
Banned for pacifism by November 1942.
	Hawkers of Death: The Private Manufacture and Trade in Arms	Philip Noel-Baker		Controller of Censorship		Unrestricted
Banned for being anti-war as it concerned private arms trading.
1940	Fair Play for Servicemen and their Families	D. F. Springhall		Controller of Censorship		Unrestricted
	Men behind the War	J. Johnson		Controller of Censorship		Unrestricted
1940	Wartime Profits	British Labour Research Department		Controller of Censorship		Unrestricted
	The Empire & the War	Communist Party of Great Britain		Controller of Censorship		Unrestricted
	Democracy for Whom? A striking Contrast: Democracy in Australia and the Soviet Union	Lance Sharkey		Controller of Censorship		Unrestricted
Banned for divulging the exploitation of the working class in war.
1939	India's demand for freedom	University Labour Federation		Controller of Censorship		Unrestricted
1940	Why must India fight?	V. K. Krishna Menon		Controller of Censorship		Unrestricted
1936	What are you going to do about it?	Aldous Huxley		Controller of Censorship		Unrestricted
On the list of banned titles in November 1942.
1941	No Friend of Democracy; A Study of Roman Catholic Politics—their Influence on the Course of the Present War and the Growth of Fascism	Edith Moore		Controller of Censorship	1942	Unrestricted
Seized from a packet addressed to the Rationalist Association and banned in November 1942 for being "disruptive on religious grounds". The book was critical of the Roman Catholic Church for cooperating with Italian Fascists.
	Tomorrow		Literary journal	Controller of Censorship		Unrestricted
	New Statesman			Controller of Censorship		Unrestricted
It had been seized by 1942. Eventually it was released.
	People's Voice		Newspaper	Controller of Censorship		Unrestricted

== Indecent Publications Tribunal (1963–1994) ==
Published	Title	Author	Type	Banned by	Banned	Current status
1963	The Group	Mary McCarthy	Novel	Customs Department	1964	Unrestricted
Although The Group was on the Customs list of prohibited or restricted books in 1964, it had already been imported and was available in bookshops. The book was later removed from the list.
1964	Washday at the Pā	Ans Westra	Children's literature	Department of Education	1964	Unrestricted
	Fanny	H. Janson		Indecent Publications Tribunal	1964	Banned
	Whiplash	R. W.		Indecent Publications Tribunal	1964	Banned
	Adultery in Suburbia	Matthew Bradley		Indecent Publications Tribunal	1964	Banned
Ruled indecent in 1964.
	The Debauched Hospodar	Guillaume Apollinaire	Pornographic novel	Indecent Publications Tribunal		Restricted
	Memoirs of a Young Rakehell	Guillaume Apollinaire	Erotic novel	Indecent Publications Tribunal		Restricted
Ruled indecent in 1965 unless circulation was "restricted to persons professionally engaged in the study of abnormal psychology". Given an R18 classification in 1975.
	The Jewel in the Lotus	Allen Edwardes		Indecent Publications Tribunal	1966	Restricted
Restricted 18 in 1966.
	Unusual Female Sex Practices	David Oliver Cauldwell		Indecent Publications Tribunal	1967	Banned
Ruled indecent in 1967.
	Female Auto-Erotic Practices	Havelock Ellis		Indecent Publications Tribunal	1967	Banned
Ruled indecent in 1967.
1888	My Secret Life	Walter	Memoir	Indecent Publications Tribunal		Restricted
In 1968 and in 1976 it was ruled indecent except in the hands of persons over 18 years of age whose professional or academic studies extend into the field covered by the book.
1967	Why Was He Born So Beautiful And Other Rugby Songs		Songbook	Indecent Publications Tribunal	1968	Banned
Ruled indecent in 1968: "This is an anthology of bawdy songs, said to be popular among players of Rugby union football. Some are diverting; many are crudely indecent. The question for the Tribunal is not whether footballers should amuse themselves by bawling these songs off the field, but whether their text should be given a wider circulation in what may be called the decent licence of print; and the Tribunal decides that it should not. It is accordingly declared to be indecent."
	Small Town Sex Today	Victor J. Banis		Indecent Publications Tribunal	1968	Banned
Ruled indecent in 1968.
	Story of Venus and Tannhauser	Aubrey Beardsley		Indecent Publications Tribunal	1968	Restricted
Restricted 18 in 1968.
	I, Jan Cremer	Jan Cremer		Indecent Publications Tribunal	1968	Restricted
Restricted 18 in 1968.
	Glory of de Dienes' Women	Andre de Dienes		Indecent Publications Tribunal	1968	Banned
Ruled indecent in 1968.
	Schönheit Im Bild III	Andre de Dienes		Indecent Publications Tribunal	1968	Restricted
Restricted 18 in 1968.
	Sun Warmed Nudes	Andre de Dienes		Indecent Publications Tribunal	1968	Banned
Ruled indecent in 1968.
	A History of Eroticism	Joseph-Marie Lo Duca; translated by Kenneth Anger		Indecent Publications Tribunal	1968	Restricted
In 1968 it was ruled indecent "except in the hands of professional students of medicine, psychology, sociology, and fine arts".
	The Cradle of Erotica	Allen Edwardes		Indecent Publications Tribunal	1968	Restricted
Restricted 18 in 1968.
	Sex and the Single Man	Albert Ellis		Indecent Publications Tribunal	1968	Restricted
Restricted 17 in 1968.
	Satan's Saint	Guy Endore	Autobiography	Indecent Publications Tribunal	1968	Restricted
Restricted 18 in 1968.
	Ladies on Call	Lee Francis		Indecent Publications Tribunal	1968	Restricted
Restricted 18 in 1968.
	Checan	Rafael Larco Hoyle	Non-fiction	Indecent Publications Tribunal	1968	Restricted
In 1968 it was ruled not indecent "except in the hands of persons under 18 years unless they be certified students of art, archaeology or ancient history."
	Walter—My Secret Life	Eberhard and Phyllis Kronhausen		Indecent Publications Tribunal	1968	Restricted
Restricted 18 in 1968.
	Black Czarina	Leopold von Sacher-Masoch; translated by H. J. Stenning		Indecent Publications Tribunal	1968	Restricted
	Venus in Furs	Leopold von Sacher-Masoch; translated by H. J. Stenning	Novella	Indecent Publications Tribunal	1968	Restricted
	Woman and the Sea	Richard Tregaskis		Indecent Publications Tribunal	1968	Restricted
	Eros Modern' Style	Patrick Waldberg		Indecent Publications Tribunal	1968	Restricted
Restricted 18 in 1968.
1797	Juliette	Marquis de Sade	Novel	Indecent Publications Tribunal		Restricted
In 1969 it was ruled indecent except in the hands of bona fide students over the age of 20 years engaged in work or research in sociological and related fields.
1907	Sadopaideia	Ashantee of Edinburgh	Erotic novel	Indecent Publications Tribunal	1969	Banned
Ruled indecent in 1969.
1958	Candy	Terry Southern; Mason Hoffenberg	Novel	Indecent Publications Tribunal	1969	Banned
Ruled indecent in 1969.
	My Bed Is Not For Sleeping	Gerty Agoston		Indecent Publications Tribunal	1969	Restricted
Restricted 17 in 1969.
	Mistress of Bayou Labelle	Lou Cameron		Indecent Publications Tribunal	1969	Banned
Ruled indecent in 1969.
	The World Is Full of Married Men	Jackie Collins		Indecent Publications Tribunal	1969	Restricted
Restricted 18 in 1969.
	Jailbirds in the Back Seat	Marcus van Heller		Indecent Publications Tribunal	1969	Banned
Ruled indecent in 1969.
	Sex Marchers	Jefferson Poland; Sam Sloan		Indecent Publications Tribunal	1969	Restricted
Restricted 18 in 1969.
	Master Masochist	Leopold von Sacher-Masoch		Indecent Publications Tribunal	1969	Restricted
Restricted 18 in 1969.
	Sex Manners and Advanced Lovers	Robert Chartham		Indecent Publications Tribunal	1970	Banned
Ruled indecent in 1970.
	Sex Turned On	Richard E. Geis		Indecent Publications Tribunal	1970	Banned
Ruled indecent in 1970.
	Community of Women	Sheldon Lord		Indecent Publications Tribunal	1970	Banned
Ruled indecent in 1970.
	Where's Poppa?	Robert Klane	Novel	Indecent Publications Tribunal	1971	Banned
Ruled indecent in 1971.
	My Carnal Confession	Gerty Agoston		Indecent Publications Tribunal	1971	Banned
Ruled indecent in 1971.
	Sex and the Over Forties	Robert Chartham		Indecent Publications Tribunal	1971	Restricted
Restricted 18 in 1971.
	Master Baiter	Troy Conway		Indecent Publications Tribunal	1971	Banned
Ruled indecent in 1971.
	Venus in India	Charles Devereux	Erotic novel	Indecent Publications Tribunal	1971	Restricted
Restricted 18 in 1971.
	Erotic Fantasies	Eberhard and Phyllis Kronhausen		Indecent Publications Tribunal	1971	Restricted
	More Walter—My Secret Life	Eberhard and Phyllis Kronhausen		Indecent Publications Tribunal	1971	Restricted
Restricted 18 in 1971.
	As the Naked Wind from the Sea	Gustav Sandgren		Indecent Publications Tribunal	1971	Restricted
Restricted 18 in 1971.
	Blue Movie	Andy Warhol		Indecent Publications Tribunal	1971	Restricted
Restricted 18 in 1971.
	The Magic Garden of Stanley Sweetheart	Robert T. Westbrook		Indecent Publications Tribunal	1971	Restricted
Restricted 18 in 1971.
1904	The 120 Days of Sodom	Marquis de Sade	Erotic novel	Indecent Publications Tribunal	1972–1998	Restricted
Ruled indecent in 1972. In 1998 it was given an R18 classification by the OFLC. It can only be displayed publicly in a sealed package with the R18 classification shown.
1970	Blue Movie	Terry Southern	Novel	Indecent Publications Tribunal	1972	Banned
Ruled indecent in 1972.
	The Screw Reader	Jim Buckley; Al Goldstein		Indecent Publications Tribunal	1972	Banned
Ruled indecent in 1972.
	Pictoral Guide to Sexual Fulfilment	Robert Chartham		Indecent Publications Tribunal	1972	Restricted
Restricted 18 in 1972.
	Die 64 Besten Sexfotos	Andre de Dienes		Indecent Publications Tribunal	1972	Restricted
	Nude Photography	Andre de Dienes		Indecent Publications Tribunal	1972	Restricted
Restricted 18 in 1972.
	Abandon	Richard E. Geis		Indecent Publications Tribunal	1972	Banned
Ruled indecent in 1972.
	Suddenly, Wonderfully Gay	Peter Kanto		Indecent Publications Tribunal	1972	Banned
Ruled indecent in 1972.
	Freedom to Love	Eberhard and Phyllis Kronhausen		Indecent Publications Tribunal	1972	Banned
	1001 Ways to Make Love	Tuli Kupferberg		Indecent Publications Tribunal	1972	Banned
Ruled indecent in 1972.
	All-Night Visitors	Clarence Major		Indecent Publications Tribunal	1972	Restricted
Restricted 18 in 1972.
	Screen	Barry N. Malzberg		Indecent Publications Tribunal	1972	Banned
Ruled indecent in 1972.
	Oracle of the Thousand Hands	Barry N. Malzberg		Indecent Publications Tribunal	1972	Restricted
Restricted 18 in 1972.
	Libido Sexualis	Albert Moll		Indecent Publications Tribunal	1972	Restricted
Restricted 18 in 1972.
	Love in the Open Air	Tuppy Owens		Indecent Publications Tribunal	1972	Restricted
Restricted 18 in 1972.
	Step by Step Instruction in Sexual Technique	Tuppy Owens		Indecent Publications Tribunal	1972	Banned
Ruled indecent in 1972.
	The Bikers	Alex R. Stuart		Indecent Publications Tribunal	1972	Restricted
Restricted 18 in 1972.
	Thongs	Alexander Trocchi		Indecent Publications Tribunal	1972	Banned
	The Gentle Degenerates	Marco Vassi	Erotic novel	Indecent Publications Tribunal	1972	Banned
	The Saline Solution	Marco Vassi	Erotic novel	Indecent Publications Tribunal	1972	Banned
Ruled indecent in 1972.
	Mind Blower	Marco Vassi	Erotic novel	Indecent Publications Tribunal	1972	Restricted
Restricted 18 in 1972.
1967	Emmanuelle	Emmanuelle Arsan	Erotic novel	Indecent Publications Tribunal	1973	Banned
Ruled indecent in 1973 and 1987.
	Xaviera	Xaviera Hollander	Autobiography	Indecent Publications Tribunal	1973	Banned
Ruled indecent in 1973.
	The Life and Loves of Mr. Jiveass Nigger	Cecil Brown		Indecent Publications Tribunal	1973	Restricted
Restricted 18 in 1973.
	Your Sex Drive	Robert Chartham		Indecent Publications Tribunal	1973	Banned
Ruled indecent in 1973.
	Erotic Art	Eberhard and Phyllis Kronhausen		Indecent Publications Tribunal	1973	Restricted
Restricted 18 in 1973.
	One Last Mad Embrace	Jack Trevor Story		Indecent Publications Tribunal	1973	Banned
Ruled indecent in 1973.
	A Secret Diary	William Veitch	Autobiography	Indecent Publications Tribunal	1973	Restricted
Restricted 18 in 1973.
1978; 1992; 1997	Marijuana Grower's Guide	Mel Frank; Ed Rosenthal	Instructional	Indecent Publications Tribunal; Office of Film and Literature Classification	1978	Banned
The deluxe edition was ruled indecent in 1978 for "adding to the sum total of knowledge about an entirely illegal activity." The book's standard edition was ruled indecent in 1992 for being "injurious to the public good and contrary to commonly accepted standards", and in 1997 it was banned by the OFLC.
1991	American Psycho	Bret Easton Ellis	Novel	Indecent Publications Tribunal; Office of Film and Literature Classification		Restricted
In December 1991 it was ruled indecent in the hands of persons under the age of 18 years. In 2014 Auckland Council requested that the OFLC reconsider the book and it was given the same R18 classification.
	Male Classics		Magazine	Indecent Publications Tribunal	1965	Banned
Male Classics no. 30 and Male Classics Annual were both ruled indecent in 1964.
	Modern Adonis		Magazine	Indecent Publications Tribunal	1965	Banned
Modern Adonis no. 25 was ruled indecent in 1964.
	Physique Pictorial		Magazine	Indecent Publications Tribunal	1965	Banned
Physique Pictorial volume 3 no. 3 was ruled indecent in 1964.
1748–1749	Fanny Hill	John Cleland	Erotic novel	Indecent Publications Tribunal		Restricted
In 1965 an expurgated edition was given an R18 classification. The book was given an R18 classification in 1991.
	Penthouse		Magazine	Indecent Publications Tribunal		Restricted
Restricted 18 in 1972.
1964	Last Exit to Brooklyn	Hubert Selby Jr.	Novel	Indecent Publications Tribunal	1967–1971	Restricted
Restricted to "adults engaged in work or research in sociological and related fields" in 1967 "because it deals almost exclusively and in sickening detail with the grossest forms of evil." It was given an R18 classification in 1971 because "the importance this work has assumed in contemporary literature is such that adults should now be able to read it". In 2014 it was given an R16 classification by the OFLC because its content "is likely to injure children and younger teenagers who are still developing the concepts, knowledge and maturity needed to make sense of the material".
1959	Naked Lunch	William S. Burroughs	Novel	Indecent Publications Tribunal	1967–1974	Restricted
Ruled indecent in 1967. In 1974 it was ruled indecent in the hands of persons under the age of 18.
	Soft Machine	William S. Burroughs	Novel	Indecent Publications Tribunal	1971–2014	Unrestricted
Given an R18 classification in 1971. It was unrestricted by the OFLC in 2014 after Auckland Council made a request for reconsideration.
	The Wild Boys	William S. Burroughs	Novel	Indecent Publications Tribunal		Restricted
Given an R18 classification in 1975.
1965	The Story of O	Pauline Réage	Erotic novel	Indecent Publications Tribunal	1967–2014	Restricted
In 1967 it was restricted to professional psychiatrists. The terms of its circulation was expanded in 1976 to include clinical psychologists. In 2014 it was given an R16 classification by the OFLC.
1887	Psychopathia Sexualis	Richard von Krafft-Ebing	Medical textbook	Indecent Publications Tribunal	1967–2015	Unrestricted
In 1967 its sale was restricted to persons concerned either professionally or as students with sexual abnormalities. It was given an unrestricted classification by the OFLC in 2015.
	The Pearl	Anonymous		Indecent Publications Tribunal		Restricted
In 1969 and 1976 it was ruled indecent except in the hands of persons over the age of 18 years engaged in research relevant to the material of the book.
1969	Oh! Calcutta!	Kenneth Tynan	Libretto	Indecent Publications Tribunal	1970–1974	Unrestricted
Ruled indecent in 1970. The ruling applied only to the script, not to any performance of the play. Ruled not indecent in 1974.
1971	Frost	Richard Amory	Erotic novel	Indecent Publications Tribunal	1972	Banned
Ruled indecent in 1972.
1966	The Song of the Loon	Richard Amory	Erotic novel	Indecent Publications Tribunal	1970–1993	Restricted
Ruled indecent in 1970. It was given an R16 classification in 1993 after a request for reconsideration from the Lesbian and Gay Archives of New Zealand Trust.
1967	Confessions of a Pimp	Nick G. as told to Jon Fowler	Novel	Indecent Publications Tribunal	1971	Banned
Ruled indecent in 1971: "There is nothing of any substance in this worthless novel by way of characterisation or story to interfere with the simple appeal it makes to wallow in grossly offensive incidents of sexual indulgence."
1969	The Goddess Game	Hugh Barron		Indecent Publications Tribunal	1971	Restricted
Restricted 18 in 1971.
1971	Jackboot Girls	Leslie McManus	Fiction	Indecent Publications Tribunal	1971	Banned
Ruled indecent in 1971.
1970	Bloody Mama	Robert Thorn	Novel	Indecent Publications Tribunal	1971–2012	Unrestricted
Ruled indecent in 1971. Unrestricted by the OFLC in 2012.
1967	A Lesbian Happening	Tony Trelos	Novel	Indecent Publications Tribunal		Restricted
Restricted 18 in 1972.
1956	Roman Orgy	Marcus van Heller		Indecent Publications Tribunal	1972	Banned
Ruled indecent in 1972.
	Olympia Reader	Maurice Girodias		Indecent Publications Tribunal	1972	Banned
Ruled indecent in 1972.
1970	The New Olympia Reader	Maurice Girodias		Indecent Publications Tribunal	1972–1993	Restricted
Ruled indecent in 1972. It was given an R18 classification in 1993 after a request for reconsideration from the Lesbian and Gay Archives of New Zealand Trust.
1971	The Room	Hubert Selby Jr.		Indecent Publications Tribunal		Restricted
Given an R18 classification in 1973.
1972	Hello Sex	Anders Jorgens; Gunilla Jorgens		Indecent Publications Tribunal	1973	Banned
Ruled indecent in 1973.
	Over-exposure	Denis William Shirley		Indecent Publications Tribunal	1973	Banned
Ruled indecent in 1973.
1970	One for the Gods	Gordon Merrick		Indecent Publications Tribunal	1973–1993	Restricted
1971	The Lord Won't Mind	Gordon Merrick		Indecent Publications Tribunal	1973–1993	Restricted
Ruled indecent in 1973. Given an R18 classification in 1993 after a request for reconsideration from the Lesbian and Gay Archives of New Zealand Trust.
1971	The Happy Hooker	Xaviera Hollander	Memoir	Indecent Publications Tribunal	1973	Banned
Ruled indecent in 1973.
1973	Inside Linda Lovelace	Linda Lovelace	Autobiography	Indecent Publications Tribunal	1974	Banned
Ruled indecent in 1974 and 1978.
	White Lunch Comix No. 1	Robert Crumb		Indecent Publications Tribunal	1974	Banned
Ruled indecent in 1974.
	XYZ Comics	Rand Holmes; Jim Jones		Indecent Publications Tribunal	1974	Banned
Ruled indecent in 1974.
1972	The Joy of Sex	Alex Comfort	Sex manual	Indecent Publications Tribunal		Restricted
The paperback edition was given an R16 classification in 1975 and in 1978 the hardback edition was as well.
	More Joy of Sex	Alex Comfort		Indecent Publications Tribunal		Restricted
Given an R16 classification in 1976 and 1978. In 2014 Auckland Council requested that the OFLC reconsider the book and it was given the same R16 classification.
	Intimate Embrace	David Oliver Cauldwell		Indecent Publications Tribunal	1975	Restricted
Restricted 16 in 1975.
	Snatches and Lays	Simon Ffuckes; Sebastian Hogbotel		Indecent Publications Tribunal	1975	Banned
Ruled indecent in 1975.
	John and Mimi	John Lobell; Mimi Lobell		Indecent Publications Tribunal	1975	Banned
Ruled indecent in 1975.
	Summer Holiday Sex Manual	Tuppy Owens		Indecent Publications Tribunal	1975	Banned
Ruled indecent in 1975.
1974	Show Me!	Helga Fleischhauer-Hardt	Sex education	Indecent Publications Tribunal	1976	Banned
The English-language edition was ruled indecent by the IPT in 1976. The German-language edition was classified as objectionable by the OFLC in 1996: "the book purports to be a manual for the sexual education of children, but presents children in an erotic manner".
	Confessions of a Window Cleaner	Timothy Lea		Indecent Publications Tribunal	1976	Restricted
Restricted 16 in 1976.
	Down Under the Plum Trees	Michael Murphy; Felicity Tuohy		Indecent Publications Tribunal	1977	Restricted
Restricted 18 unless instructed by parents or professional advisers. An interim restriction order was made.
1975	Ancient and Modern Methods of Growing Extraordinary Marijuana	Adam Gottlieb	Instructional	Indecent Publications Tribunal	1978	Banned
1975	The Complete Psilocybin Mushroom Cultivator's Bible		Instructional	Indecent Publications Tribunal	1978	Banned
	Horney Housewife			Indecent Publications Tribunal	1979	Banned
	Make It Happy: What Sex Is All About	Jane Cousins		Indecent Publications Tribunal		Restricted
Restricted 16 in 1979.
	Delta of Venus	Anaïs Nin	Collection of erotic short stories	Indecent Publications Tribunal	1979	Restricted
Restricted 16 in 1979.
1976	Xaviera's Supersex	Xaviera Hollander		Indecent Publications Tribunal	1980,1986	Banned
1969	The Improvised Munitions Handbook	United States Department of the Army	Instructional	Indecent Publications Tribunal	1983	Banned
1977	Home Workshop Guns for Defense and Resistance Volume 1	Bill Holmes	Instructional	Indecent Publications Tribunal	1983	Banned
1979	Home Workshop Guns for Defense and Resistance Volume 2	Bill Holmes	Instructional	Indecent Publications Tribunal	1983	Banned
1982	Bare Kills	Oscar Diaz-Cobo	Instructional	Indecent Publications Tribunal	1983	Banned
1980	Galactic Girl	Fiona Richmond		Indecent Publications Tribunal	1982–1992	Restricted
Ruled indecent in 1982 for having "no honest purpose [and being] capable of corrupting persons likely to read the book". "Normally, it is possible to discern a plot in books that are referred to the Tribunal. In considering this publication, we have had considerable difficulty in trying to find any coherent story in the mass of explicit sexual descriptions that permeate this book." It was given an R18 classification in 1992: "Galactic Girl consists of a series of sexual encounters loosely strung together without benefit of plot. There is a brief description of spanking (page 86) and on page 126 there is a foiled attempt to get a robot to rape a woman, but these are passing incidents which in no way constitute the dominant effect. We accordingly classify this publication as indecent in the hands of persons under the age of 18 years."
	A Different Love			Indecent Publications Tribunal	1985	Banned
	I Once Had a Master	John Preston		Indecent Publications Tribunal	1985	Banned
A Different Love and I Once Had a Master were ruled indecent in 1985 because they "dwell on and glamorise the sexual side of homosexual relationships".
1977	Men Loving Men	Mitch Walker		Indecent Publications Tribunal	1983–1993	Unrestricted
	Joy of Gay Sex			Indecent Publications Tribunal	1983–1993	Unrestricted
	Lovers			Indecent Publications Tribunal	1983–1993	Unrestricted
Men Loving Men, The Joy of Gay Sex, and Lovers were ruled indecent in 1983 because, although they were presented in a "serious restrained manner, [they] nevertheless promote and encourage homosexual activity, which is of course a criminal offence in New Zealand, (Note: Consensual sex between men was legalized in New Zealand in 1986 with the passage of the Homosexual Law Reform Act.) thereby liable to corrupt persons who might read them." Men Loving Men kept its classification in 1988 in a 3–2 decision for not dealing with the subject of AIDS, the section on S&M, and a "very brief section on drugs as a means of enhancing sexual pleasure". All three books were ruled not indecent in 1993 after a request for reconsideration from the Lesbian and Gay Archives of New Zealand Trust.
	Coming to Power	Samois		Indecent Publications Tribunal	1985	Banned
Ruled indecent in 1985: "Some of the stories are well written but many are crude and lacking in any redeeming features."
1896	Parisian Frolics	Adolphe Belot		Indecent Publications Tribunal	1985	Banned
Banned because its stories "had no literary features, and were little more than a camouflage for a series of explicit sexual episodes."
1810	Venus School Mistress	George Cannon		Indecent Publications Tribunal	1985	Banned
Banned for lacking "any real historical, social, or literary merit". "At best it is a social document but we feel it lacks any real historical, social, or literary merit to declare it other than indecent. We are reinforced in this point of view by the impression that if this book was written now rather than over a century ago, the Tribunal would have little hesitation in finding it indecent."
	Joy	Joy Laurey		Indecent Publications Tribunal	1987	Banned
1983	The World of the American Pit Bull Terrier	Richard F. Stratton	Non-fiction	Indecent Publications Tribunal	1991	Banned
	Click	Milo Manara		Indecent Publications Tribunal	1991	Banned
	Boobytraps	United States Department of the Army		Indecent Publications Tribunal	1991	Banned
	Xaviera's Magic Mushrooms	Xaviera Hollander		Indecent Publications Tribunal	1992	Restricted
Restricted 18 in 1992.
1971	The Anarchist Cookbook	William Powell	Instructional	Indecent Publications Tribunal	1994	Banned

== Office of Film and Literature Classification (1994–present) ==
Published	Title	Author	Type	Banned by	Banned	Current status
1991	Diva Obsexion	Federico De Zigno; Riccardo Morrocchi; Stefano Piselli	Illustrated	Office of Film and Literature Classification	1995	Banned
Banned for tending to support a theme of sadistic force against women.
	The Great Big Narcotics Cookbook		Book	Office of Film and Literature Classification	1995	Banned
Banned because it details how to manufacture and use illegal drugs.
	Behind Closed Doors	Alina Reyes	Fiction	Office of Film and Literature Classification	1996	Banned
Banned because it "tends to promote and support the exploitation of children and young persons for sexual purposes, the use of urine and excrement in association with sexual conduct, the act of bestiality, and the infliction of extreme violence."
1992	The Seventh Acolyte Reader		Collection of short stories	Office of Film and Literature Classification; Film and Literature Board of Review	1996	Banned
Banned in 1996. The ban was upheld by the Board of Review in 1997 and 2000. In Moonen v Film and Literature Board of Review, the 1997 classification was appealed to the High Court and then to the Court of Appeal. The Court of Appeal rejected the appeal, but concluded that neither the High Court nor the Board of Review had given effective consideration to the Bill of Rights Act. The Court of Appeal determined that the words of the Classification Act must be given "such available meaning as impinges as little as possible on the freedom of expression". As a result of the Moonen case, the OFLC must always consider the freedom of expression set out in the Bill of Rights Act.
	Total Abuse: Collected Writings, 1984–1995	Peter Sotos		Office of Film and Literature Classification	1998	Banned
Banned "because it promotes and supports the exploitation of children and young persons for sexual purposes; the use of violence to force persons to submit to sexual conduct; sexual conduct with a dead person; the use of urine and excrement in association with degrading, dehumanising and sexual conduct (rape, torture and abuse); bestiality; and acts of torture and the infliction of extreme violence and extreme cruelty."
1997	The Giant Black Book of Computer Viruses	Mark Ludwig	Non-fiction	Office of Film and Literature Classification	1998	Banned
Banned for its instructional purpose and "mischievous design": "It is clear from the way that the book is organised that the information is intended to be put to use [...] the warning on the back cover of the book is a clear invitation for irresponsible computer users to use the information."
1996	Death Scenes: A Homicide Detective's Scrapbook		Photobook	Office of Film and Literature Classification	1998	Banned
Banned because of "the significant extent and degree to which this book presents degrading and dehumanising images of death": "The Classification Office believes that there is likely injury to the public good in forensic photographs of this nature being widely available as entertainment."
1976	David Hamilton's Private Collection	David Hamilton	Photobook	Office of Film and Literature Classification	1998	Banned
Banned for tending to promote or support the sexual exploitation of children and young persons.
1992	Twenty Five Years of an Artist	David Hamilton	Photobook	Office of Film and Literature Classification	1998	Banned
Banned for sexualizing children and young persons.
1999	Holiday Snapshots	David Hamilton	Photobook	Office of Film and Literature Classification; Film and Literature Board of Review	2000	Banned
Banned in 2000. The ban was upheld by the Board of Review in 2001 and 2004.
	Opium for the Masses	Jim Hogshire	Educational	Office of Film and Literature Classification	2002	Banned
Banned for explicitly detailing methods of procurement, cultivation, extraction and consumption of opium.
1996	Psilocybin Mushrooms of the World	Paul Stamets	Educational	Office of Film and Literature Classification	2002	Banned
Banned because it "deals exclusively with the location, identification and ingestion" of controlled hallucinogenic plants.
	The Big Book Of Buds	Ed Rosenthal	Educational	Office of Film and Literature Classification	2002	Banned
Banned for promoting and encouraging cultivation and use of cannabis: "The publication contains extensive information on plant varieties, articles on topics such as decriminalisation of cannabis and the history of cannabis use, and numerous high quality photographs. Although the book advised against illegal activity, the dominant effect of the publication as a whole is the promotion and encouragement of the criminal act of cultivating and using cannabis, an offence under s9 of the Misuse of Drugs Act 1975."
1998	Advanced Techniques Of Clandestine Psychedelic & Amphetamine Manufacture	Uncle Fester	Educational	Office of Film and Literature Classification	2003	Banned
Banned for instructing how to clandestinely manufacture and distribute illegal drugs.
2006	The Peaceful Pill Handbook	Philip Nitschke; Fiona Stewart	Non-fiction	Office of Film and Literature Classification	2007	Mixed
The original edition of the book (ISBN 978-0-9788788-2-5) was banned in 2007 for dealing with "the infliction of serious physical harm", giving "instruction on how to commit and conceal criminal acts" such as drug smuggling and manufacture, and "how to conceal one's involvement with the commission of a suicide". The New Revised International Edition (ISBN 978-0-9788788-3-2) which altered the original by obscuring sections of text was given an R18 classification in 2008 and must be in a sealed bag labelled with the classification: "The dominant effect of these rather obvious 'censored sections' is that the book no longer provides sufficient practical instructional detail in how to commit crime to fall within s3(3)(d) of the FVPC Act. A secondary effect is that readers are left in no doubt about the authors' opinion of New Zealand censorship law and of the Classification Office's application of it to the first version of this book. This secondary effect is, however, of no concern to the law because it is an expression of opinion." The Society for Promotion of Community Standards made a request for reconsideration in 2008, but the Board of Review did not change the R18 classification.
	Little Sister Club 2	Various / DO Comics	Manga	Office of Film and Literature Classification	2007	Banned
Banned for encouraging readers to view children and young teenagers as valid objects of sexual desire, to derive sexual pleasure from inflicting pain, and to use violence against vulnerable young people to compel participation in sexual conduct.
	Pleasant Dripping With Sweat	Izumi Tsukimori	Manga	Office of Film and Literature Classification	2009	Banned
Banned because it encourages readers "to view children and young persons as valid objects of sexual desire who are physically and emotionally available for sexual activity, and therefore promotes their exploitation by adults".
2012	Into the River	Ted Dawe	Novel	Office of Film and Literature Classification	2015	Unrestricted
Banned in 2015; subsequently unrestricted in the same year.
2016	Natsu no Maboroshi	Takanae Kyourin	Doujinshi	Office of Film and Literature Classification	2018	Banned
Banned because "Its purpose is to sexually arouse those with a interest in children and it encourages adults to regard children as appropriate subjects for sexual fantasy."
2017	Oji-san to. / With an Old Guy	Tarazoo	Doujinshi	Office of Film and Literature Classification	2018	Banned
Banned because "Its purpose is to sexually arouse those with a interest in young girls and it encourages adults to regard them as appropriate subjects for sexual fantasy."
2017	Kokonotokoro	Ishikei	Doujinshi	Office of Film and Literature Classification	2018	Banned
Banned for encouraging adults to regard children and young persons as appropriate subjects for sexual fantasy.
2019	The Great Replacement	Brenton Tarrant	Text File	Office of Film and Literature Classification	2019	Banned
74 page Manifesto published prior to the Christchurch mosque shootings. Banned for promoting murder and terrorism. An appeal was filed by The Kiwi Party Incorporated, and the Board held their prior decision.

== See also ==
- Book censorship
- Lists of banned books
- Censorship in New Zealand
- Indecent Publications Tribunal
- Office of Film and Literature Classification

== Bibliography ==
- Anderson, John (1952). Military censorship in World War I: its use and abuse in New Zealand (MA). Victoria University College.
- Baker, Michelle (2006). Policing Publications: Sites of Censorship Classification Enforcement in New Zealand (MA). University of Canterbury.
- Baker, Michelle (30 November 2010). From The Butcher Shop to The Peaceful Pill: A history of book censorship in New Zealand (PDF). LIANZA Conference 2010. Dunedin.
- Brown, Charlotte Amelia (2003). Censorship for art's sake (LLM). Victoria University of Wellington.
- Burns, A.C. (1968). Some aspects of censorship: a survey of censorship law and practice in New Zealand from 1841 to 1963, mainly concerning the control of indecent publications (MA). Victoria University of Wellington.
- Cheer, Ursula (1996). "A State's Increasing Role in Monitoring Expression: New Zealand's New Censorship Regime". Canterbury Law Review. 7: 333–368.
- Cheer, Ursula (May 2000). "Censorship and the Bill of Rights" (PDF). New Zealand Law Journal. 2000: 145–146.
- Christoffel, Paul (1989). Censored: A Short History of Censorship in New Zealand. Monograph Series. Wellington: Research Unit, Department of Internal Affairs. ISBN 0-477-05633-4.
- Davidson, Jared (2019). Dead Letters: Censorship and Subversion in New Zealand 1914–1920. Dunedin: Otago University Press. ISBN 978-1-98-853152-6.
- Gillard, Nick (October 2016). Knowing Where to Draw the Line: Assessing the Protection of Fine Art from Censorship in New Zealand (PDF) (LLB (Honours)). University of Otago.
- McGill, David; Rogers, Anna; Customs (1991). The Guardians at the Gate: The History of the New Zealand Customs Department. Wellington: Silver Owl Press. ISBN 0-9597979-0-4.
- McLachlan, Bruce; Scott, W. J. (1973). C*ns*rsh*p: A study of the censorship of books, films and plays in New Zealand. Auckland: Heinmann Educational Books.
- Milburn, Prince; New Zealand Book Council (1981). Books you couldn't buy: Censorship in New Zealand. Wellington: Prince Milburn and Company. ISBN 0-7055-0761-0.
- Perry, Stuart (1965). The Indecent Publications Tribunal: A Social Experiment. Whitcombe and Tombs.
- Perry, Stuart (1980). Indecent Publications: Control in New Zealand (Revised ed.). Wellington: Government Printer. ISBN 0-04-770110-2.
- Simpson, Tony (1992). Shame and Disgrace: A History of Lost Scandals in New Zealand. Penguin Books. ISBN 0-14-014934-1.
- Stewart, Georgina; Dale, Hēmi (26 February 2018). "Reading the 'ghost book': Māori talk about Washday at the Pā, by Ans Westra". Video Journal of Education and Pedagogy. 3 (2). doi:10.1186/s40990-018-0014-2. hdl:10292/12833. ISSN 2364-4583.
- Tapper, Oliver (2011). Dealing with "Objectionable" Art: New Zealand's Approach (LLB). Victoria University of Wellington.
- Taylor, Nancy M. (1986). The Home Front. Official History of New Zealand in the Second World War 1939–45. Vol. II. Wellington: Historical Publications Branch, Department of Internal Affairs. ISBN 0-477-01260-4.
- Watson, Chris; Shuker, Roy (1998). In the Public Good?: Censorship in New Zealand. Palmerston North: Dunmore Press. ISBN 0-86469-305-2.
