= Jewel in the lotus =

Jewel in the lotus may refer to:

== Philosophy ==
- Om mani padme hum, a Sanskrit mantra influential to Buddhism

== Literature ==
- The Jewel in The Lotus, a 1959 compilation of orientalist erotica by Allen Edwardes
- Jewel in the Lotus, a 1987 textbook on tantra yoga by Sunyata Saraswati and Bodhi Avinasha

== Music ==
- The Jewel of the Lotus, a track on Ramasutra's 1999 electronic album East Infection
- Jewel in the Lotus, a 1987 religious album by The Bahá'í House of Worship
- The Jewel in the Lotus (album), a 1974 jazz album by Bennie Maupin

== Theater ==
- The Jewel in the Lotus, a 2007 production by Kriyananda
