= John Heidenry =

American writer and magazine editor

John Heidenry (born May 15, 1939) is an American author and editor.

== Biography ==
Born in St. Louis, Missouri, Heidenry studied theology at Saint Louis University but did not take a degree. During 1960–61 he edited three small Catholic Monthlies: Social Justice Review, Catholic Women's Journal and The Call to Catholic Youth. After a two-year stint as a reporter for the St. Louis Review, he moved to New York, where he worked as managing editor of Herder and Herder, a major publisher of Catholic theology and philosophy. During this period he married Patricia Reynolds and they had four children.

Resigning from his job, Heidenry and his family embarked on a six-year adventure, living on a Midwestern farm; a house overlooking the English Channel in Langton Matravers, England; an old family home in working-class south St. Louis; a hacienda in San Miguel de Allende, Mexico; and a final sojourn in St. Louis, where he became the founding editor of both St. Louis magazine and the St. Louis Literary Supplement. During this period, Patricia Heidenry educated their children at home, an experiment she wrote about in ˜Home Is Where the School Is" in The New York Times Magazine.

Returning to New York again, Heidenry worked as editor of Penthouse Forum, interim editor of Maxim magazine, and executive editor of The Week. He also wrote four books: Theirs Was The Kingdom: Lila and DeWitt Wallace & the Story of the Reader's Digest (W W Norton, 1993), What Wild Ecstasy: The Rise and Fall of the Sexual Revolution (Simon & Schuster, 1997), The Gashouse Gang: How Dizzy Dean, Leo Durocher, Branch Rickey, Pepper Martin, and Their Colorful, Come-from-Behind Ball Club Won the World Series-and America's Heart-During the Great Depression (Public Affairs, 2007), Zero at the Bone: The Playboy, the Prostitute, and the Murder of Bobby Greenlease (St. Martin's Press, 2009), and co-authored, with Brett Topel, The Boys Who Were Left Behind: The 1944 World Series between the Hapless St. Louis Browns and the Legendary St. Louis Cardinals (University of Nebraska Press, 2006).

According to The New York Times, Heidenry was accused by Philip Nobile, his former coworker at Penthouse Forum, of plagiarizing parts of What Wild Ecstasy. The accusation raised the question of whether ordinary, workaday prose, rather than "unique expression," can be plagiarized. Times reporter Janny Scott questioned whether Heidenry was actually guilty of plagiarism. She suggested that the portions of his writing that were similar to those of other writers were insufficiently unique to constitute plagiarism. According to Scott, while Nobile wanted Simon & Schuster to recall What Wild Ecstasy, it declined to do so, arguing that the parallels consisted only of "purely factual" statements "available for all writers to use," although it did offer "to change future printings, crediting four articles Heidenry left out of his sources list."

In 1998 the Institute for Advanced Study in Human Sexuality (IASHS) in San Francisco awarded Heidenry an honorary degree for his history of human sexuality in the U.S., ranging from the pioneering work of sex researchers Masters and Johnson and John Money to pornographers Reuben Sturman, Bob Guccione and Al Goldstein to the gay-rights movement.

== See also ==
- Reader's Digest
- DeWitt Wallace
- Bob Guccione
- Caligula (film)
- Golden Age of Porn
- Annie Sprinkle
- Marco Vassi
- Plato's Retreat
- Robert DiBernardo
- Al Goldstein
- Sexual Preference
- Dizzy Dean
- Kidnapping of Bobby Greenlease
