= Fire in the Abyss =

1983 novel by Stuart Gordon

- First edition (publ. Berkley Books); Cover art by Paul DiCampli
- Author: Stuart Gordon (Richard Gordon)
- Publisher: Berkley Books
- Publication date: August 1983
- ISBN: 0-425-06081-0

Fire in the Abyss is a 1983 science fiction novel by Stuart Gordon, pen name of Richard Gordon, having as its main character the Elizabethan adventurer Humphrey Gilbert, an actual historical figure, as a time traveler.

The first section of the book is set in England and spans Gilbert’s youth to his fateful voyage to North America. These chapters are well researched and blend historical fact and fictitious events and individuals. Numerous, as well as humorous, notable individuals from 16th century England populate this section, including Nick Udall, headmaster of Eton College, and Thomas Cromwell, Henry VIII's chief minister who was beheaded. The arrogant and occasionally brutal Gilbert works his way up the social ladder of England’s hierarchical society until he secures the financial and political backing to launch two expeditions to North America, both of which are ultimate failures, the later a deadly disaster.

The last which recorded history knows of Gilbert is that he and his ship the "Squirrel", were lost in a severe storm off Newfoundland in 1583. Since nobody ever saw or heard of him or his ship again, it is generally assumed that the ship went down with all hands, Gilbert included. Gordon's book, however, assumes that Gilbert did not drown but was transported through time to the 20th century, by a secret project of the United States Navy.

A similar idea about Gilbert was taken up by another writer, Philip José Farmer. In Farmer's The Gate of Time (1966), Gilbert is not displaced forward in time but sidewise into an alternate timeline.

== Plot summary ==
Gilbert awakens in 1983 floating in the north Atlantic when all of a sudden a U.S. submarine emerges from the depths and plucks him from certain death. (The book's cover shows Gilbert on the deck of a modern submarine.) Together with some hundred other "Temporally Displaced Persons," or DTIs, the government term for those it’s kidnapped from other times, Gilbert is illegally incarcerated in a secret installation in Horsefield, New Jersey where authorities conduct experiments designed to extract historical and linguistic secrets from the past. Gilbert is forced to live a pathetic existence of living in a prison and must wear a protective suit just to prevent himself from being infected with deadly modern day viruses and bacteria.

Just when hope seems to have run dry Gilbert discovers that he and the other DTIs have developed a telepathic ring, coordinated by the Ancient Egyptian priestess Tari, a follower of the cult of Isis. In this ring they are able to share their dreams, fears and plans for escape. Together with Tari, a Norse giant, a dancer from ancient North America and many others, Gilbert escapes from his illegal confines. This is a deadly plan as the US government is eager, even willing to kill, to keep the scandalous DTIs a secret from the public. Once on the outside Gilbert, Tari and a handful of others find themselves on-the-run and overwhelmed by culture shock.

Dodging murderous government agents and curious laymen Gilbert wanders across the American continent, meeting up with crazed Irish nationalists, an anti-government rock group and even working for a time in a San Francisco S&M parlor, indulging his homosexual desires. One by one Gilbert’s companions are killed off by accident or murder until he alone finally makes an escape back to England, where he again finds himself an outsider and fugitive.

The book, written in the first person, is Gilbert's diary and is intended as proof of the government misdeeds committed against DTI’s. Gilbert makes many sardonic remarks on the life and institutions of the modern world in general and present-day Britain in particular, but also enjoys disabusing moderns who tend to romanticize the Elizabethan Age. Gordon is especially harsh in his mocking of the political paranoia that infected the United States during the Cold War.

Gordon, a Scotsman, does manage to have Gilbert, an Englishman, visit the author’s home town of Buckie on the northeastern coast of Scotland.

== Release details ==
- 1983, USA, New York City:Berkley Books, (ISBN 0-425-06081-0), Pub date August 1983.
- 1984, UK, Arrow Books: (ISBN 0-09-932530-6), Pub date February 23, 1984.

== Reception ==
Colin Greenland reviewed Fire in the Abyss for Imagine magazine, and stated that "Colourful writing with an unusual message."

== Reviews ==
- Review by Faren Miller (1983) in Locus, #273 October 1983
- Review by Bill Collins (1984) in Fantasy Review, June 1984
- Review by Colin Greenland (1984) in Foundation, #31 July 1984
- Andrews, Graham. Fire in the Abyss. By Stuart Gordon. Paperback Inferno Aug. 1984.
