= The Eyes (novel series) =

Series of science fiction novels

The three covers for each of the books in the series.

The Eyes was a series of science fiction novels written in the 1970s by Richard Gordon under the pen name Stuart Gordon.

The series is set in a post-apocalyptic world where the same nature was torn and mutated. The origin of the catastrophe is at first uncertain, due to the passing of centuries and to the sheer scale of destruction it unleashed upon the land. In Book Two some characters speculate that the original cause might be a large-scale nuclear war or a cometary impact, while in Book Three it is finally revealed that the cataclysm originated from a failed attempt to tap energy from a parallel universe to warm-up the Earth, which at the time was facing a deadly cooling of its climate.

This contact with a parallel universe generated too much energy for the Earth to absorb safely, leading to a major activation of all tectonic faults, with geological, oceanic and atmospheric disasters hitting the globe and the extra background radiation causing widespread mutations in humans as well as other living beings. Following a fateful planetary conjunction happening at the same time of the upheavals, Earth's axis shifted and the duration of the year increased to 370 days. Destruction was so complete that the epoch of the disaster was called 'The Great Forgetting' and only a handful of survivors were spared. Over centuries, they settled in a belt of marginally fertile lands in an island-continent not far from the location of the failed experimental energy bridge, while the rest of the explored world is barren and uninhabitable.

The plot revolves around a mutant child with god-like powers called the Divine Mutant, the reincarnation of a former mutant king born one thousand years before, which is itself the reincarnation of the lead scientist who created the energy bridge two thousand years in the past. The Mutant follows his chaotic, plague-like 'Dream', determined to spread madness and confusion in the slowly rebuilding world. Unbeknownst to him, the Mutant himself is manipulated by the Unmen, coloured, revolving, crystal-like prismatic beings who inhabit the parallel universe, who wish to take back the energy they lost on Earth. The Unmen's sinister plot requires the mass-reaping of human life-force (to be collected through deadly winds of black shadow cast upon the lands), which is made available to the Unmen by infecting people with the madness of the Dream.

Most of the events of the series are seen through the eyes of a group of people involved in the Divine Mutant's schemes and by those who wish to stop the chaos spreading in the human lands.

== Series ==
- One-Eye. (1973)
- Two-Eyes. (1974)
- Three-Eyes. (1975)

== Plot ==
=== Book One ===
The first book deals with the birth of the Divine Mutant in the secluded, insular ancient city of Phadraig (where mutants are swiftly put to death at birth) and his escape in the northern wastelands, aided by his mother and by a group of former heroes-adventurers of the city rallied around former war-hero Patrick Cormac. Together they form the Chatachain Company, which includes the Cuyahogan - a white golem of the ancient era bound to the people of Phadraig. The Company, under the guide of an expert trapper named Gnorl, manages to safely cross the most dangerous part of the wastelands, while Phadraig's pursuers are not so lucky.

In the north the Divine Mutant reckons with his ancient lieutenants, a group of 30 powerful mutants (the mumen) from his ancient reign who hibernated in a subterranean complex from the time of the catastrophe and awaited for his reincarnation. After the meeting, the newborn and his mumen followers perform a magical dance and defeat Khassam, a powerful mutant overlord who had declared himself to be the Divine Mutant and assembled an army some 10,000 strong in order to conquer Phadraig and the southern lands. The dance of the true Divine Mutant manages to destroy Khassam's mind and spreads the plague of his Dream in the minds of Khassam's soldiers, who disband the army and start killing each other in a deranged frenzy. The Divine Mutants lets escape some survivors - including his former Chatachain companions, no longer necessary for his protection - into the nearby lands, so to further spread the plague of the Dream. During this carnage the Cuyahogan frees itself from the control of the humans and tries, unsuccessfully, to attack the humans. The golem flee the battlefield in frustration, while the Divine Mutant and his retinue of mumens and possessed humans moves north to take possession of Zagrin, the capital of Khassam's empire in the fertile lands.

=== Book Two ===
The second book is set just some days after the end of the first one. It revolves around Liam, a former bard and one of the Phadraig ex-adventurers of the first novel, who roams the lands of Miir (northwest of Phadraig and of Khassam's camp) after the dispersion of Khassam army and the separation from his comrades. While the Divine Mutant's madness begins to spread around the country, Liam - still shocked by the events of the first book - meets and befriends Tshea, a noblewoman of the ancient city of Ussian. The two manage to survive the chaos of the Dream - triggered in the city by the bandit king Nikosner who first met with the hybernating mumen - and Liam discovers that, by playing his ancient technological musical sirena, he has the power to influence the minds of other people. In particular, he finds he is able to harness the madness induced by the Mutant and turn it into more positive thoughts. While Nikosner killed himself out of his madness Liam, Tshcea and many Ussian's survivors reach the Delta of Miir region, where the imminent fulfillment of an ancient prophecy related to the legendary Zuni Bird has gathered thousands of people fleeing from the burning nearby lands.

With the help of the Cyclones (kind of a priestly order of the cult of the Zuni Bird) Liam manages to reach the top of an ancient pyramid buried in the swamps of the delta and plays his songs at the proper astral conjunction time. The psychical energies liberated by the event provides a soul-awakening in all the witnesses, who are now able to resist the plague of the Dream and pass this immunity and their newfound inner abilities to others. Liam disappears at the climax of the mystical event, never to be seen again, while all the witnesses, now named the Children of the Song (among them Tshea an Algon - the former leader of the Cyclones), spread in the world to oppose the madness of the Dream.

=== Book Three ===
The third book focuses on the conflict between the Dream and the Song, with the Children of the Song determined in the stabilization of their newly-acquired powers and trying to discover the roots of the Dream in order to defeat it. While the Divine Mutant loses followers recovered to sanity thanks to the power of the Song, the Children learn that the Unmen - ever-revolving colored crystal-like being from another reality - are planning the harvest of humanity life-forces in order to recover the energy they lost on Earth, using the Mutant as a tool to trigger the proper state of mind in the people to be reaped. The Umnen already tried an harvest a millennium before through the first incarnation of the Divine Mutant, but results were disappointing and their project was perfectioned and postponed to the current era, where the Unmen arranged for a new body for the Mutant and for the discovery of the subterranean complex of the Shanzee mountains where the Mutant's 30 mumen were hybernating.

The story revolves around Tah Ti, a former Cyclone and now a Children of the Song who listened directly to Liam during the ceremony at the submerged pyramid. With the help of fellow Children and other people - among them Potidan the merchant - he manages to enter the Shanzee complex. Hewre he meets the Cuyahogan and Sinope, a girl the Cuyahogan out of its loneliness saved from a pointless human sacrifice in a nearby village. Tah Ti and Sinope discover a strong mutual attraction to each other and Tah Ti learns of the golem's origin: it was an artificial being of the times of the cataclysm, tasked with killing the mutants in order to keep their numbers under control.

Under a malicious suggestion by a jealous Cuyahogan, Tah Ti connects with the energies of a dangerous chamber of the complex which holds the memories of many people long dead. Fighting to keep his self together, Tah Ti discovers the true origin of the Divine Mutant as the reincarnation of Adam Cadman, the tyrannical human leader of the Council of 30 (the current mumen) who, two thousand year before, triggered the cataclysm by tapping too much energy from the reality inhabited by the Unmen. With the backfire of Adam's project - called Point Zero, aimed at resolving an impending global ice age caused by previous humanity's mistakes - and the triggering of an unstoppable set of geological cataclysms, Adam and his followers first created the Cuyahogan and its similars (at present time all destroyed but Cuyahogan) by imbuing them with shards of their life-forces, then built the subterranean complex of Shanzee to survive the catastrophe.

In the complex Adam and the 30 kept a mirror tuned to the world of the Unmen, which the Unmen exploited to slowly mutate and control all those who took shelter in the complex. In the end Adam Cadman transferred his decaying self into a crystal matrix from which he could be able to reincarnate (becoming the first and the second Divine Mutant, the second time reincarnating in Phadraig due to the life-force link with Cuyahogan), while the Council of 30 became the mumen, forced to eternally dance in patterns of power and indissolubly tied to their master.

The Unmen put all of them under their control through the madness-inducing Dream, which prevented them to recover their old personalities. Tah Ti also discovered the origin of the Song, being first played with sirenas through the ages by the builders of the submerged pyramid - a group of people oppose to the Zero Point project who tried to save as many people as possible and to commune with the future to put an end to the shadow cast by the Unmen over humanity. Tah Te briefly managed to send a confirmation he received the meassage to Ourania, the leader of the pyramid-builders, just instants before she and her followers were killed in the climax of the cataclysm, which also submerged the pyramid. With the stabilizing Rhyme acquired from Ourania's memories Tah Ti is able to stabilize the Song in himself and get new abilities, among which prescience.

Cuyahogan already triggered the self-destruction of the Shanzee complex, to obey of his directive to kill the mutants and ensure the destruction of the crystal matrix of the Divine Mutant, then escapes the complex with Sinope, aimed to kill the body of the Mutant itself. At the same time, finally suspecting to be a puppet under control of some entity he cannot perceive, the Divine Mutant leaves Zagrin and moves to the land of Lamassa, to investigate the only region he cannot see in his Dream, dispatching ten of his mumen to the Shanzee complex to retrieve his matrix.

Tah Ti and the Cyclones manage to find the Divine Mutant's matrix in the Shanzee complex and together they defeat the ten mumen sent to retrieve it. They also succeed in awakening thousands of maddened mumen's followers and evacuate them from the complex before it is destroyed by the power reactor meltdown triggered by Cuyahogan. Tah Ti and the Cyclones finally move north to Lamassa, but they are just but witnesses to the final confrontation between the Unmen, the Divine Mutant and the Cuyahogan, who all meet at the very center of the alien settlement, which is nothing but the ancient Point Zero.

Here the Mutant and the twenty surviving mumen recover their former selves and minds of before the cataclysm, with no memories of the following events and relentlessly attacked by the mind powers of the Unmen to be subdued for good. Then Cuyahogan traces the Mutant/Adam thanks to its link to his life-force and discovers that he cannot anymore kill Adam or his mumen now that they are human again. Subduing to his former master Adam, under his command Cuyahogan projects all its memories what happened since the activation of Point Zero. Adam is shattered by the implied revelations and loses control on Cuyahogan, which leaps to Point Zero to protect Sinope from Unmen mind attacks To prevent the contamination of their world by Cuyahogan, the Unmen finally remove the energy bridge between the worlds, closing Point Zero and annhihilating themselves, the Cuyahogan and the mumen. Only the child body of the Divine Mutant survives, with no traces of the Dream or of Adam's personality.

The Children of the Song shatters the matrix in order to prevent further reincarnation of Adam, and the infant body of the Mutant, now devoid of any eldritch power or external influence, is adopted by Tah Ti and Sinope.

The madness of the Dream is now over and all of humanity may now get access to the mind-opneing Song and the stabilizing Rhyme created in the ancient past.

The book closes several decades after the struggle, with Tah Ti and Potidan discussing about a book of the events which Potidian just completed.
