= Richard Gordon (Scottish author) =

Scottish author (1947–2009)

Richard Alexander Steuart Gordon
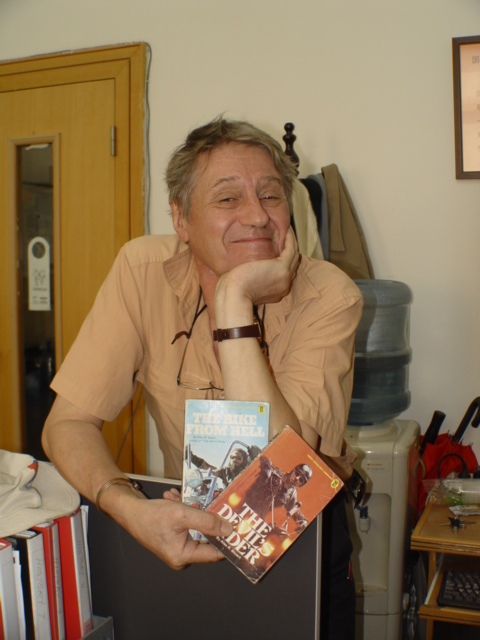
- Richard Gordon in 2007 in Shanghai, China holding two of his earliest works, The Bike from Hell and The Devil’s Rider
- Born: 18 May 1947; Banff, Scotland
- Died: 7 February 2009 (aged 61); Shanghai, China
- Citizenship: British
- Education: Newcastle University
- Occupations: Writer, Teacher
- Relatives: David Gordon (brother), mother
- Writing career
- Pen name: Alex Stuart, Alex R. Stuart, Stuart Gordon
- Genres: Science fiction, Travel literature

Richard Alexander Steuart Gordon (18 May 1947 – 7 February 2009) was a Scottish author born in Banff, Scotland who wrote numerous science fiction novels, encyclopedias, and travel guides. Gordon's novels are noted for their mix of historical fact and creative fictionalized events.

== Life ==
Gordon was brought up and educated in Buckie and Perthshire. His family's home is located at the Cairnfield estate near Arradoul. Gordon studied history at Newcastle University and was offered post-graduate work, but instead he accepted a job as a market researcher. He later left this position and made a career as a writer. His first novels were published in the 60s in New Worlds magazine with Michael Moorcock as editor.

After several years of writing, in 1969 Gordon moved to London, where he took a course in teaching English as a foreign language. Gordon began teaching abroad in his 50s. He first taught in Poland, and then in 2003 he relocated to China. Gordon collapsed at the Lianhua Road Subway Station in the Shanghai Metro of a heart attack and died in hospital on 7 February 2009. He had been teaching at Shanghai High School International Division since 2005.

== Publications ==
Gordon began publishing science fiction with "A Light in the Sky" for New Worlds in 1965 as Richard A. Gordon. Later his publisher asked him to adopt a different pseudonym to avoid confusion with Gordon Ostlere, the author of the Doctor books who wrote under the pen-name Richard Gordon. Gordon initially adopted the pen name Alex Stuart, but was again asked to change his pen name due to complaints from author Violet Vivian Stuart, who published historical fiction under that name. He then adopted the name Alex R. Stuart and later took on the pen name Stuart Gordon. Gordon's later work was published under his own name.

One interesting note of Gordon's work is the colourful dedications he had in his earliest works, such as the following for The Bikers: To She Who Types Like a Drunken Midget Playing the Piano.

While Gordon only ever wrote one fictional piece set in Scotland (1975's Suaine and the Crow God), the characters in his other books occasionally pass through his hometown. In his writing, Gordon often made reference to his Moray roots. In Fire in the Abyss time-warped Sir Humphrey Gilbert passes through Buckie, where Gordon grew up.

In the late 1980s Gordon ventured into non-fiction and before his death he completed a number of works on the paranormal and a series of illustrated walking and history guides of northern Scotland. In addition, he wrote several articles under the pen name The Moray Rambler. Gordon's 1992 publication "The Paranormal: An Illustrated Encyclopedia" elicited the ire of Gordon Stein, the director for the Center for Inquiry, a non-profit educational organization whose primary mission is to dispel paranormal claims. Stein wrote a stinging review in the Spring 1994 issue of the Skeptical Inquirer, critiquing Gordon's usage of "erroneous 'information' about the paranormal" and usage of references that "are never to the skeptical literature."

== Partial list of works ==
Works are published under pseudonym Stuart Gordon unless otherwise noted.

- The Bikers (1971) - published under pen name Alex Stuart
- The Outlaws (1972)- published under pen name Alex R. Stuart
- Time Story (1972)
- The Bike from Hell (1973) - published under pen name Alex R. Stuart
- The Devil's Rider (1973) - published under pen name Alex R. Stuart
- One-Eye (1973) The Eyes #1
- Two-Eyes (1974) The Eyes #2
- Three-Eyes (1975) The Eyes #3
- Suaine and the Crow-God (1975)
- Smile on the void: The mythhistory of Ralph M'Botu Kitaj (1981) (available at archive.org)
- Fire in the Abyss (1983)
- Archon (1988) Watchers #1
- The Hidden World (1988) Watchers #2
- Down the Drain: Water, Pollution and Privatisation (1989) - with coauthor Jennie Smith
- The Mask (1990) Watchers #3
- Eye in the Stone (1990)
- The Paranormal: An Illustrated Encyclopedia (1992)
- The complete Moray rambler (1992) - Published under Richard Gordon
- The Encyclopedia of Myths and Legends (1993)
- The Book of Spells, Hexes, and Curses : True Tales From Around the World (available at archive.org)
- The Book of Miracles: From Lazarus to Lourdes (1995)
- The Book of Hoaxes: An A-Z of famous fakes, frauds and cons (1995)
- The Book of Curses: True Tales of Voodoo, Hoodoo and Hex (1995)
- Round Inverness, The Black Isle and Nairn: Walks and History (1998) - Published under Richard Gordon
- Round Moray, Badenoch and Strathspey: Walks and History (1999) - Published under Richard Gordon
- Round Aberdeen from Beeside to the Deveron (2000) - Published under Richard Gordon
