= Cradle of Erotica =

Book by Allen Edwardes and R.E.L. Masters

The Cradle of Erotica: A Study of Afro-Asian Sexual Expression and an Analysis of Erotic Freedom in Social Relationships is a book written by Allen Edwardes and R. E. L. Masters that was first published in 1963. The book explores the sexual practices and rituals of various ethnic groups from India, Africa, and Southeast Asia. The accuracy of the scholarship has been disputed by many of its reviewers, with the work being accused of demonstrating Orientalist exaggerations and caricatures of a hypersexualized "East".

== Background ==
Edwardes authored multiple novels that claimed to explore eroticism and sexuality outside of Western culture. Edwardes also penned The Jewel in the Lotus: A historical survey of the sexual culture in the East, a novel that analyzes peculiar sexual behaviors of Asian ethnographies. His Erotica Judaica investigates the sexual history of the Jews. Masters is a close confidant of Edwardes. Masters's novels focused on human conscientious and potential. Together these two authors crafted The Cradle of Erotica to examine and access sexual activities of Afro-Asian cultures.

== Summary ==
=== Philosophy ===
Edwardes and Masters begin this chapter by explaining the importance of copulation in both the Muslim and Hindu faiths. The Turkish writer Khojeh ’Omar Halebi Abbbu ‘Othman, author of the Book of the Secrets Laws of Love, details how Allah and Eros, Greek for intimate love, are one of the same divine law. This divine attraction between man and woman is mirrored in Hindu belief.

Wang Shih-cheng explains how this attraction is as natural as the Earth and one cannot blame this attraction on evil. Edwardes and Masters then address and explain the matriarchal dominance of sex in Afro-Asian sexual practices, especially those relationships seen in the Muslim faith. Conservative Muslims believe the liberation of women from their natural position of subservience in Muslim culture is a pathway to indulging in lustful sex without shame. Differing from the intimate love synonymous with Allah, lustful sex is strictly for physical enjoyment, while intimate sex is a connection in both spirit and body.

This chapter then goes on to describe the allegedly lascivious natures of Hinduism and the Chinese. This supposedly endless thirst for sexual activity in Oriental ethos is compared to various animals. This chapter introduces belief systems that widely differ from those of Western sexuality and this trend is carried throughout the other chapters of this book.

=== Genitalia ===
This chapter is almost exclusively dedicated to the various sizes and measurements of the genitals of Afro-Asian peoples. Comparisons between humans and animals are common throughout this chapter. Addressing the vagina, the authors claim that each ethnic and or religious group has their own opinion of the variations of the vagina. The morphology of the clitoris in certain ethnicities renders place names that distinguish them from their other Afro-Asian cousins. This variation is not seen with the descriptions and measurements of the various penises of Afro-Asian men. In fact, Edwardes and Masters cite Sir Richard Burton's and Dr. Jacobus' observations and measurements as solid facts in regards to the penises of various ethnicities. This chapter also explores specific parts of the penis, such as the glans and its coloration, as further means of distinction between the ethnicities of Afro-Asian.

=== Genital intercourse ===
This chapter states how many Afro-Asian cultures refer to copulation as an art. The descriptions and analysis of various sexual techniques, practiced by men and or women, comprises the core material of this chapter. The authors claim that Coitus prolongatus, the process of delaying the ejaculation of a male in order to accelerate the female orgasm, is a sexual technique practiced by Muslim and Hindu men. Themes of sadomasochism and violence are examined in Islamic, Hindu, and Egyptian sexual folklore.

In Egypt, the title of abu ̅ hhimla ̅t, which translates to "father of assaults," is a label of pride, boasting of a man's voracious lovemaking. Aphrodisiacs are also mentioned in detail throughout this chapter. The authors claim that opium and marijuana, specifically hashish, are used by many Afro-Asian cultures in order to enhance their sexual experiences. Opium is used to excite the imagination and dull the senses, while hashish is used to desensitize and prolong the erection of a penis. The authors claim that a female under the influence of hashish had the purported ability to have consecutive vaginal and anal sex with over one hundred men .

=== Promiscuity ===
This chapter examines the institution of marriage in Afro-Asian culture. The authors describe men of ease as Arabian men who profit from the sexual exploitation of their wives, sisters, daughters, or any other female relative. Their female counterparts, loose women, are wives that participate in prostitution. Edwardes and Masters quote the French army surgeon Dr. Jacobus, who calculate that over 80% of Arabian married couples are involved in adultery. North African Arabian women have reported that they have engaged in sex with more than one man at one time. This act not only conflicts with the Western belief of a monogamous sexual partner, but questions the Western characterization of two men having sex with the same female as homosexual. This thought is cemented with evidence of Arabian and Egyptian dancers having gaping vaginal orifices. This lust for polyandry is also evident in Arabian women engaging in copulation with several males at once in erotic parlor games.

=== Anal intercourse ===
This chapter explores anal intercourse in Afro-Asian sexual culture. The chapter starts with the biological explanation of why a man would be drawn to the anus. The anal sphincter contains a greater contractile power than the vagina, and this allows the male greater pleasure through increased friction. The chapter continues to claim that anal intercourse is a routine practice among many Muslim women. The authors claim that Indonesian and Malayan people also routinely practice sodomy. Chinese Muslims and Buddhists are also notorious for using their servant boys as means of sexual release.

=== Masturbation ===
Edwardes and Masters attribute the prevalence of masturbation in Afro-Asian societies to the sleeping and living patterns of children. Two or more young boys often share a room, even a bed in some cases, which often leads to genital play. Patterns of behavior are then formed. In the East, young boys follow a regular pattern of manual and oral stimulation. Those boys who refuse this genital play are rejected and labeled as sexless hermaphrodites. Jewish and Muslim boys also engage in this social masturbation. Masturbation is not explicit to young boys. Allegedly, North African Jewish girls perform acts of masturbation with their male relatives. The male relative often reciprocates the act. Sadomasochist themes, which were mentioned in the Genital Intercourse chapter, are also evident in feminine masturbation. Female masturbation is seen as an outlet for girls' frustration and aggressiveness.

=== Oral intercourse ===
Edwardes and Masters label early Egyptians as the first peoples to commercialize fellatio. Egyptian women would apply lipstick to their lips in order to mimic the appearance of the vulva. Cleopatra, who wore lipstick herself, was said to have performed fellatio on over 1,000 men. The rest of the chapter investigates specific examples of fellatio in Afro-Asian cultures. Certain brothels in Northern and Eastern Africa are specialized in the art of qerdz, or sucking. Arabian, Indian, and African women have all supposedly been found to be employed at these brothels. When their husbands are away from work, Sa’udi Arabia women are mentioned as performing fellatio to random males. Men living in Mecca create concubines of women in order to fulfill their sexual hunger, specifically cunnilingus. Fellatio is also witnessed between men and their boy servants.

== Critical reception ==
The book and its authors, Allen Edwardes and R.E.L Masters, have been criticized for perpetuating orientalism, especially in retrospective reviews. Orientalism is a patronizing, and often racist branch of Western thought about the beliefs and practices of cultures in India, East Asia, or the Middle East.

A contemporary positive review for Psychosomatics written by "W. D." claimed the book was well cited and a useful resource for sexologists. Another contemporary review in the American Sociological Review by Evelyn Hooker praised the intention of the work, but argued its propensity to exaggerate made it unfit for scientifically rigorous research.

In recent years, Joseph Boone uses orientalism as his weapon of demystification against what he argues is Edwardes and Masters' fictional portrayal of Eastern sexuality. Boone states that homosexuality is recognized and glorified in Eastern sexuality in order to make Western, white, civilization more pure and civilized. He uses the obsession with the penis sizes of Egyptians and Arabian men in The Cradle of Erotica as a perfect example of sublimation. Boone goes on to say that through a complicated method of execution, Edwardes and Masters use exotic Eastern sexuality as a platform for expressing Western homosexual thought, without sacrificing any homologous sexual belief that is supposedly shared among all Western people. Roland Boer goes further in his 2012 work The Earthly Nature Of The Bible, stating that The Cradle of Erotica is an example of what he called "Orientialist camp" that was a hallmark of Edwardes' career.
