= André de Dienes =

Hungarian photographer

Andor György Ikafalvi-Dienes (born, December 18, 1913 – April 11, 1985), known as André de Dienes, was a Hungarian photographer, noted for his work with Marilyn Monroe and his nude photography.

== Life ==
Dienes was born in Kézdivásárhely, Kingdom of Hungary, (now Târgu Secuiesc, Romania), on December 18, 1913, and left home at 15 after the suicide of his mother. Dienes travelled across Europe mostly on foot, until his arrival in Tunisia. In Tunisia he purchased his first camera, a 35mm Retina. Returning to Europe he arrived in Paris in 1933 to study art, and bought a Rolleiflex shortly after.

Dienes began work as a professional photographer for the Communist newspaper L'Humanité, and was employed by the Associated Press until 1936, when the Parisian couturier Captain Molyneux noted his work and urged him to become a fashion photographer. In 1938 the editor of Esquire, Arnold Gingrich offered him work in New York City, and helped fund Dienes' passage to the United States. Once in the United States Dienes worked for Vogue and Life magazines as well as Esquire.

When not working as a fashion photographer Dienes travelled the USA photographing Native American culture, including the Apache, Hopi, and Navajo reservations and their inhabitants. Dissatisfied with his life as a fashion photographer in New York, Dienes moved to California in 1944, where he began to specialise in nudes and landscapes.

As well as Marilyn Monroe, Dienes also photographed such notable actors as Elizabeth Taylor, Marlon Brando, Henry Fonda, Shirley Temple, Ingrid Bergman, Ronald Reagan, Jane Russell, Anita Ekberg and Fred Astaire.

De Dienes married twice, and died of cancer on April 11, 1985, in Hollywood.

=== Marilyn Monroe ===
In 1945 Dienes met the nineteen-year-old Marilyn Monroe, then called Norma Jeane Baker, who was a model on the books of Emmeline Snively's Blue Book Model Agency.

Snively told Dienes of Norma Jeane, and suggested her for his project of photographing artistic nudes. In his memoirs Dienes described the first time he met Monroe saying "...it was as if a miracle had happened to me. Norma Jeane seemed to be like an angel. I could hardly believe it for a few moments. An earthly, sexy-looking angel! Sent expressly for me!".

His series of pin-up shots of her at Long Island's Tobay Beach, in Oyster Bay, New York became notable.

Norma Jeane had recently separated from her husband, James Dougherty and told Dienes of her wish to become an actress. Dienes suggested that they go on a road trip to photograph her in the natural landscapes, for which Dienes paid her a flat fee of $200. Dienes had earlier been present at the first meeting of Monroe and her mother in six years, and had a brief affair with Monroe during the trip. He presumptuously announced to her mother that he and Monroe were to be married. His photographs of Monroe from this trip sold widely and he made far more money from the images, and did not offer Monroe a percentage of the sales, or pay her on the profits.

Dienes next met her on Labor Day in 1946, with her new name of Marilyn Monroe, they next worked together in 1952, where he shot her at the Bel Air Hotel and 1953, where she telephoned him at 2am, and took him to a darkened street where he used his car headlights to illuminate her, taking pictures her wide-eyed and unmade up. Dienes last saw her alive in June 1961. Of their last meeting he said that "...her success was a sham, her hopes thwarted...the next day she left a bouquet outside my door: a selection of her latest photos. Smiling, radiant - utterly misleading; I little guessed that this was our last goodbye".

=== Legacy ===
In recent years, Dienes' photography has received overdue critical attention from a variety of sources. In 2002, Taschen published an 848-page two-volume monograph titled Marilyn, noting "his original, inspired style" and how Dienes "soon built up a huge portfolio of stunning photographs of the smiling brunette which helped to launch her model career and, a few years later, a film career that was to make her a legend." An exhibition, entitled "André de Dienes: Marilyn and California Girls," opened June 9, 2016 at the Steven Kasher Gallery in New York City, representing the first solo show of Dienes' photography in New York in over ten years.

== Published works ==
- The Nude. The Bodley Head, London, 1956.
- Nude Pattern. The Bodley Head, London, 1958.
- Best Nudes. The Bodley Head, London, 1962.
