= Mimi Lobell =

American architect

Mimi Lobell (born Miriam Louise Comings; July 18, 1942 – April 7, 2001) was an American architect, professor, cultural historian, and second wave feminist.

== Early life ==
Lobell was born in the Midwest, the youngest of three children. She grew up in farm country in Illinois and Indiana. Her father was a professor of chemical engineering and later a department chair and then a dean. Her mother was a college-educated stay-at-home housewife.

== Education ==
Lobell attended Middlebury College in Vermont from 1959 to 1960 before transferring to the Graduate School of Fine Arts at the University of Pennsylvania to study architecture, getting a Master of Architecture degree in 1966. Her professors there included Edmund Bacon, Denise Scott Brown, Robert Geddes, Romaldo Giurgola, Ian McHarg, G. Holmes Perkins, and Robert Venturi. Louis Kahn was at Penn at that time and was influential on the school and her education. While at Penn, she married fellow architecture student John Lobell.

== Architectural offices ==
After school, Lobell moved to New York City and between 1966 and 1973 worked in prominent architectural offices, including Kahn & Jacobs, Architects (1966–68) where she was architectural designer on the Minskoff Office Building and Theaters in New York; Marcel Breuer & Associates (1968–70) where she was architectural designer on the Cleveland Museum of Art and the Grand Coulee Dam Third Power Plant; and John M. Johansen and Associates (1970–72) where she was senior designer on Roosevelt Housing, New York. She became a registered architect in New York State in 1974 when only one and a half percent of registered architects in the United States were women.

== Teaching career ==
Lobell started teaching at the School of Architecture at Pratt Institute in Brooklyn, New York in 1972, becoming full-time in 1976, only the second woman at the School to receive a full-time appointment and tenure in 1986, and taught there until her death. She taught design studios, architectural history, and various electives including Non-Western Architecture and Myth and Symbol in Architecture, and she served as a chair. She lectured throughout the world, and in particular at the New York Open Center and the New York Jung Foundation.

=== Scholarship and feminism ===
While second wave feminism was mostly focused on political issues, some women, including Lobell, were also interested in feminine spirituality as represented by "the goddess." In 1974 Marija Gimbutas published The Goddesses and Gods of Old Europe and in 1976 Merlin Stone published When God Was a Woman. Lobell was influenced by them as well as by Joseph Campbell and she began to research goddesses in Neolithic cultures and to present at archaeological conferences internationally, including at the 1986 World Archaeological Conference held at the University of Southampton in England. She was invited to present at that conference by Professor Colin Renfrew.

=== Women in architecture ===
Lobell became deeply involved in the women's movement in architecture. She was one of the originators of the exhibit at the Brooklyn Museum in 1977 entitled "Women in Architecture" curated by Susana Torre.

== Publications ==
=== Book ===
Lobell is the author of the posthumously published book Spatial Archetypes: The Hidden Patterns of Psyche and Civilization, which looks at culture from a symbolic point of view, and at cultural development as moving through what she calls the Sensitive Chaos of hunter-gatherers, the Great Round of the Neolithic Goddess, the Four Quarters of Bronze Age Warrior Chieftains, the Pyramid of hierarchical nation states, the Radiant Axes of empires, the Grid of commerce, and the Dissolution of decline. Influences on her approach include Oswald Spengler with his morphological patterns; Joseph Campbell and his mythological insights; and the depth psychology of Carl Jung. And she focuses on periods of history when cultures were organized around the Goddess.

=== Heresies Magazine Issue #5 ===
Lobell was a member of the collective that edited Heresies Magazine Issue #5: The Great Goddess (Volume 2, Number 1). That issue included Lobell's Goddess Temple project (see below) and her article "Temples of the Great Goddess." Heresies: A Feminist Publication on Art and Politics was published from 1977-1992 by the Heresies Collective.

== Architectural projects ==
Lobell designed a series of projects that explored her symbolic and Goddess interests, including her Goddess temple of 1975 proposed for the Rocky Mountains in Colorado, done in collaboration with Jungian psychiatrist Jan Clanton. It was published in Women in American Architecture: Unbuilt America, Heresies, Chrysalis, Sorcieres, and East West Journal. It was exhibited at the Brooklyn Museum, SOHO 20 Gallery, and other venues.
