= Robert Chartham =

English sexologist, academic, and writer (1911–1985)

Robert Chartham was the pseudonym of Ronald Sydney Seth (5 June 1911 – 1 February 1985), an English writer who used the surname Chartham for his activity as a sexologist and the surname Seth for books about travel and espionage.

As a child Seth was a chorister at Ely Cathedral and a King's Scholar at King's Ely. He was educated at Cambridge University.

Appointed Professor of Literature at the University of Tallinn, Estonia, Seth returned to London at the start of World War II, joining the BBC and helping to start the Monitoring Intelligence Bureau. In 1941 he was commissioned into the Royal Air Force and in 1942 joined the Special Operations Executive. Parachuted into Estonia, he was captured by and later defected to the Germans. He was trained by the Sicherheitsdienst (the SS intelligence agency) as an agent for a mission to Britain. He spent most of the rest of the war as an informer in the Oflag 79 prisoner-of-war camp, but in April 1945 was entrusted with a message of peace by Heinrich Himmler (head of the SS), which he carried to London via Switzerland.

Seth's career included teaching and counselling in European universities, lecturing to British university students on "How to Enjoy Sex" and serving as a counsellor in his own London clinic. When he was 61, he was treated by Peter Malcolm Stephan for his osteoarthritis, which helped relieve him of his pain.

He was an editorial consultant to Forum: The International Journal of Human Relations.

During the 1970s, he lived in Malta with his second wife, Barbara McAdam Seth.

== Works ==
as Ronald Seth:

- Baltic Corner: Travel in Estonia, 1939
- A Spy Has No Friends, 1952. Republished 2008 by Barbara Seth, Seth's second wife.
- Secret Servants, a History of Japanese Espionage, 1957
- Operation Retriever, Before 1958
- Operation Lama, Before 1958
- The True Book about the Secret Service, Before 1958
- Operation Ormer, Before 1958
- How Spies Work, Before 1958
- The Spy and the Atom Gun: Introducing Captain Geoffrey Martel of the British Secret Service, 1958
- For My Name's Sake, 1958
- Stalingrad: Point of Return. The Story of the Battle, August 1942-February 1943, London: Gollancz, 1959
- Two Fleets Surprised, 1960
- Anatomy of Spying, 1963
- Forty Years of Soviet Spying, 1965
- Caporetto, 1965
- Russell Pasha, 1966
- The Russian Terrorists, 1967
- The Executioners: The Story of SMERSH, 1967
- The Sleeping Truth: The Hiss-Chambers Affair: the Spy Case that Split a Nation, 1968
- Spies: Their Trade and Their Tricks, 1969
- Encyclopedia of Espionage, 1972
- Jackals of the Reich, 1972

as Dr. Robert Chartham:

- Mainly for Wives, 1963
- Sex Manners for Advanced Lovers, 1969
- The Sensuous Couple, 1971
- Your Sexual Future, 1973
