= Mark Ludwig =

American computer scientist

Mark Allen Ludwig
- Died: 2011
- Education: MIT, Caltech
- Known for: Computer virus research
- Scientific career
- Fields: Computer Virology
- Academic advisors: Richard Feynman

Mark Allen Ludwig (August 5, 1958 – 2011) was an American physicist. He was the author of books on computer viruses and artificial life. He died from cancer at age 51.

== Education ==
Ludwig spent less than two years as an undergraduate at MIT, but was reputedly still able to get into the Physics doctorate program at Caltech on the basis of recommendation letters from his past MIT teachers where he was a classmate of Stephen Wolfram in Richard Feynman's course on advanced mathematical methods for physics.

== Work ==
Ludwig had his own virus-writing periodical, Computer Virus Developments Quarterly. He also held the First International Virus Writing Competition, which promised a monetary reward of $200 for the creator of the smallest MS-DOS-based, parasitic file infecter.

His Little Black Book of Computer Viruses fully describes a sophisticated MS-DOS executable virus. The second, Giant Black Book of Computer Viruses contains the source code of two UNIX companion viruses written in C In his book Computer Viruses, Artificial Life and Evolution: The Little Black Book of Computer Viruses he argued for intelligent design. The book was criticized by biologist Gert Korthof for making errors and incorrect statements about evolutionary biology.

== Publications ==
- The Christian Revolutionary (2009)
- True Christian Government: The Facts About What The Bible Has To Say About Government (2009)
- The Third Paradigm: Democracy Is Headed The Way Of The Monarch By Divine Right. What Will Replace It? (2009)
- The Third Paradigm: God and Government in the 21st Century (1997)
- The Little Black Book of Computer Viruses (1996)
- The Giant Black Book of Computer Viruses (1995)
- The Giant Black Book of Computer Viruses 2nd edition (1998)
- Computer Viruses, Artificial Life and Evolution (1993)
- The Little Black Book of Email Viruses (2002)
