= Gerty Agoston =

Hungarian-American playwright and novelist

Gerty Agoston is a Hungarian-American playwright and novelist.

== Early life ==
Agoston was born in Budapest, Hungary. When she was 6 years old, she wanted to come to the United States after seeing American films.

After studying in Paris, she went to New York City with her sister who had married a United States citizen. When she was in Paris, she wrote for the publication New Yorker Staats-Zeitung for 26 years and was a film correspondent for Basler Zeitung. For 3 years, Agoston was the cultural correspondent of Deutsche Presse-Agentur. She later decided to quit her journalism career for writing novels and plays.

== Writing career ==
Agoston has written 13 novels which have been translated into multiple languages. One of her novels, My Bed Is Not For Sleeping, was banned in Australia. Other novels include I Married a Hundred Husbands and My Husband Is a Magnificent Whore. Her one-act play; For Each Man Kills; was published in the anthology The Best One-Act Plays Of 1948-1949 and her one-act play Three Parsons was published in The Best One-Act Plays Of 1950-1951. She translated German plays into English as well as American plays into German.

== Documentary ==
She was one of the subjects of Deeper Than Y, a 2006 documentary about aging and the elderly.
