= Eberhard and Phyllis Kronhausen =

Husband-and-wife team of American sexologists

Eberhardd W. en Phyllis C. Kronhausen show collection of Erotic Art in Palace-Hotel in The Hague, 1977

Phyllis (1929 - 2012) and Eberhard Kronhausen (1915 - 2009) were a husband-and-wife team of American sexologists, mainly active in the 1960s and 1970s. They wrote a number of books on sexuality and eroticism, and they also amassed a collection of erotic art, which traveled around Europe in 1968 as the "First International Exhibition of Erotic Art" and then found a home in San Francisco as the Museum of Erotic Art (1973-1975).

== Biography ==
Eberhard Kronhausen was born on September 12, 1915. He was brought up in Europe and “had firsthand experience of Nazi Germany”. Phyllis was born on January 26, 1929 in Minnesota. The Kronhausens met in 1954 at the University of Minnesota, where Phyllis, then 25, was an undergraduate studying business, and Eberhard, at the relatively late age of 39, was getting a Masters in psychology.

Upon graduating from Minnesota they moved together to New York, where Phyllis enrolled in the program in “Marriage and Family Life Education” at the Teachers’ College of Columbia University, which allowed her to take courses also at other New York universities. Eberhard followed suit two years later, and both graduated with Doctor of Education degrees in that program (Phyllis graduating in 1956 and Eberhard in 1958). They also studied psychoanalysis at the National Psychological Association for Psychoanalysis, founded by Dr. Theodor Reik to provide for analytic training of non-medical students. Upon graduation they moved to San Diego, where they were both licensed to practice psychotherapy.

In 1959, they published their first book, Pornography and the law: The psychology of erotic realism and pornography. This would be the first of a long line of sex-related books. Pornography and the Law made a distinction between "frankly pornographic writings" and "serious" (but not necessarily less erotic) writings, such as the works of Henry Miller or D.H. Lawrence. In 1960 Phyllis Kronhausen testified in a California obscenity case, involving a series of soft core erotic writings. According to the Kronhausens, "her testimony resulted in an acquittal of the defense, saving the author and publisher of these truly harmless books many years in jail."

Pornography and the Law was followed in 1960 by Sex Histories of American College Men, a book based on Phyllis Kronhausen's experience as a lecturer in "health education" at a men's college in the Northeastern U.S. (which is not named). One of Kronhausen's course requirements had been for her students to complete a "personal history" in which they described sexual memories and experiences.

=== Erotic art collection ===
After publishing Pornography and the law, the Kronhausens began to acquire a collection of erotic art. This brought them to Europe, where they were active during the 1960s. As they reminisced in 1978:

It so happened that from 1960 on we came to spend more and more time in Europe, first on psychological consultation and later because we felt that we had both been spending too much time in the same cultural environment and needed a change for our own personal development.

In Europe we collected more erotic art, our most notable discoveries from the beginning of that period being the Dutch painter Melle in Amsterdam, the German painter Hans Bellmer, the Trieste-born artist Leonor Fini, and the French surrealist André Masson in Paris.

[...] We had occasion, in fact, to watch the transformation of pornography into art before our own eyes when Hans Bellmer one day worked in our presence, making a complicated and highly erotic engraving from a series of common pornographic photographs.

Their books were translated into German and French starting in the late 1960s.

They organized the “First International Exhibition of Erotic Art" at a public museum in Lund, Sweden in 1968 – overcoming a lot of institutional resistance. They even succeeded in having the public poster for the show feature a graphic representation of sexual intercourse.

In relation to that show they published the two-volume art book Erotic Art in 1968 and 1969, featuring illustrations of erotic art from different periods of time and different cultures. This would lead to other picture books such as Erotic Book Plates (1970), The International Museum of Erotic Art (1973), and Behind Closed Doors : A Marriage Manual (1979). The latter was not really a manual but rather a book of nearly 2,000 black and white photographs without text, featuring a real French husband & wife couple having sex in a variety of positions, in every room of their home including the hallway and stairs. (The photography was by Robin Schwartz, a woman who was a friend of the couple.)

The collection went on to find a home in San Francisco, as the Museum of Erotic Art, which existed from 1970 to 1973, on Powell Street in downtown.

In 1978 the Kronhausens were featured in Hustler magazine, with a piece on the Bible's Book of Genesis, illustrated with a series of erotic paintings. "What poor, sick, twisted guilt-ridden, neurotic mind first conjured up a sexless Garden of Eden?" the article begins. The Kronhausens then argue that the Bible has been misunderstood, and that the story of Adam and Eve is not about the discovery of sin, but about the loss of innocent enjoyment of sex - "and with it the appearance of false shame where none is called for, and needless guilt where no evil has been committed." The paintings that illustrate the article were said by the Kronhausens to be by an anonymous artist and dated to 1850-1900, but could well be 1970s imitations of 19th century art, and are not necessarily about the Garden of Eden.

On March 31, 1979 the Kronhausens sold their erotic art collection at an auction in New York City. The collection fetched a fairly low price. "In general bidding wasn't feverish," reported New York Magazine. "On the evidence of other auction sales, it seems that New Yorkers harbor more lust for Sheffield silver than for images of other people lusting. [...] The Drs. Kronhausen were apparently drawn most often to a major style of the 1960s - the look of high-contrast black-and-white photography joined to hot, buzzing billboard colors. That was a liberated style for about two seasons. Now yesterday's liberation has been turned into the liquidity of today."

=== New-age period ===
One reason for the sale was that, starting in the late 1970s, the Kronhausens had turned to New Age spirituality. They were living at that time in California, and came into contact with the teachings of the Indian-born theosophist and spiritual director Jiddu Krishnamurti, at his American headquarters in the New Age hotspot of Ojai, near Los Angeles. They watched many of Krishnamurti's talks at the video library there.

In the 1980s and 90s they became involved in nutrition, creating a diet called "Formula for Life" which they publicised through a book of that title (1989). They advocated abstinence from red meat and therapeutic megadoses of Vitamin C. They also advocated for nutritional supplements such as glutathione.

At the turn of the millennium they became involved in Buddhist philosophy and psychology. They attempted to apply the result of these studies to the fields of history, politics, and psychotherapy in their last book, Staying Sane in a Crazy World (2008) – a print on demand book sold by Amazon.com.

Eberhard died at the age of 94 on December 5, 2009. Phyllis died at the age of 83 on April 16, 2012.

== Trivia ==
Eberhard Kronhausen was thanked in the album "Freak Out!" (1966) by Frank Zappa and the Mothers of Invention.

== Quotes ==
- "Woman [is] the untouchable saint who through her spiritual purity raises and ennobles the grosser, baser male".
- "What modern women seem to want is not just more sex, but better sex. Together with increased aggressiveness in mature women, there appears to be a trend toward demanding, and if necessary, seeking, better sexual performance from male partners".
- "One should not... be surprised to hear that failure to achieve sexual happiness is likely to have an adverse effect on the woman’s total relationship with her partner and may lead to the breakdown of their relationship".

== Bibliography ==
Unless otherwise noted, all titles are by Eberhard and Phyllis Kronhausen.

- Pornography and the law: The psychology of erotic realism and pornography, Ballantine Books, 1959; revised edition 1964.
- Sex Histories of American College Men : A Study in Detail of the Sex Life of American College Men Showing the Cultural and Psychological Influences On Sexual Development, 1959
- The Sexually Responsive Woman, Grove Press, 1964 (with a foreword by Simone de Beauvoir)
- Sexual Response in Women, 1965
- Walter: the English Casanova, Ballantine Books 1967
- [as editors] Walter, “My Secret Life": the unique memoirs of England’s most uninhibited lover, 3 volumes, Polybooks London 1967
- Erotic Art: a Survey of Erotic Fact and Fancy in the Fine Arts, Grove Press, 1968
- Erotic Art vol. 2, Grove Press, 1969
- Erotic Fantasies, a Study of Sexual Imagination. New York: Grove Press, 1969.
- Erotic Book Plates, Bell, 1970.
- The International Museum of Erotic Art, 1973
- The Sex People: Erotic Performers and Their Bold New Worlds, 1975
- The Complete Book of Erotic Art, [compiles Erotic Art vols. 1 and 2], Bell Publishing Company, 1978. ("This book is dedicated to the people of Sweden and Denmark without whose maturity and dedication to democratic freedom the first international exhibition of erotic art would not have been possible.")
- Robin Schwartz and Phyllis Kronhausen, Behind Closed Doors : A Marriage Manual, with nearly 2000 photographs. Materia Medica, 1979.
- [with Harry B. Demopoulos, M.D.] Formula for Life. The Definitive Book on Correct Nutrition, Anti-Oxidants and Vitamins, Disease Prevention, and Longevity. William Morrow and Company, 1989. (Revised edition, 1999)
- Staying Sane in a Crazy World, 2008

== Filmography ==
=== Films directed by Eberhard and Phyllis Kronhausen ===
- Psychomontage (1962). An experimental short film shot in 16 mm., consisting of rapid cuts between black and white clips of war, industry, animal mating, and human sexuality. Screened at Cinema 16, the New York art house founded by Amos Vogel.
- Freiheit für die Liebe ["Freedom to Love"] (Germany, 1970) “A film about the irrationality of common sexual prejudices and traditional sex laws, Freedom to Love advances the point of view that sexual freedom is not inimical to the interests of society.” (mubi.com)
- Hvorfor Gør De Det? [“Why do they do it?”] (Denmark, 1971) “A plea for sexual tolerance in the form of a factual, non-moralistic portrayal of unorthodox sex acts.” (mubi.com)
- Porno Pop (Switzerland, Denmark, USA, 1971)
- Sex-cirkusse [“Sex circuses"], a.k.a. The hottest show in town (Denmark, 1974) “A circus on the brink of bankruptcy comes up with a new show mixing traditional circus acts with sex.” (imdb.com)

=== Appearances ===
- Phyllis Kronhausen appeared twice on television interviews with the West Coast TV personality Paul Coates, probably around 1960. "On these programs, for the first time in America, some Oriental and Western erotic art was shown on that mass medium—to be sure, with some of the most 'risqué' portions of the pictures blocked out by strips of paper.” (Eberhard and Phyllis Kronhausen, Introduction, The Complete Book of Erotic Art, p. 4.)
- The Kronhausens were interviewed in the Danish film Det Kære Legetøj [“The Dear Toys”], a.k.a. Sex and the Law, a.k.a. Danish Blue (1967) – not to be confused with Danish & Blue (1970). The film is described as “a combined fiction and documentary, the goal of the movie is to help legalize porn. When the movie was made however it was still illegal to produce and publish porn in Denmark.” (vintage-erotica-forum.com)
