= The Bikers (novel series) =

The Bikers is the first of 5 novels about a notorious biker gang written in the early 1970s by Richard Gordon under the pen name Alex R. Stuart.

The plot of the series was a group of motorcycle gangs that were terrorizing contemporary Britain.

== Series ==
- The Bikers. (1971)
- The Outlaws. (1972)
- The Last Trip. (1972)
- The Bike from Hell. (1973)
- The Devil's Rider. (1973)
