= Stuart Perry =

New Zealand librarian

Charles Stuart Perry (11 March 1908 – 12 October 1982) was a New Zealand librarian. He was born in Melbourne, Victoria, Australia in 1908.
