= Marco Vassi =

American writer (1937–1989)

Marco Ferdinand William Vasquez-d'Acugno Vassi (died January 14, 1989) was an American writer and thinker, most noted for his erotica. He wrote fiction and nonfiction, publishing hundreds of short stories, articles, and more than a dozen novels. He wrote at least one play, The Re-Enactment (under the name of Fred Vassi), which was performed at the Caffe Cino in January 1966. In his study of modern erotic literature, critic Michael Perkins said that "it is not ... (Vassi's) imagination but the power of his ideas that make him the most interesting figure in recent erotic literature."

== Biography ==
Vassi was born and lived most of his life in New York City. He was married three times, but was well known for sexual, drug, and alternative-lifestyle experimentation. He viewed life as the theory and practice of liberation, an exploration of being sexual, that is an all-sexual being, bisexual, and homosexual. Vassi coined the term metasex, which meant any sex outside the bounds of heterosexual marriage. He once wrote in Beyond Bisexuality:

When one transcends male-female dualism, eroticism becomes susceptible of a more subtle mathematical understanding. For each number, there is a different and unique quality of consciousness, and no one is intrinsically superior to any of the others. ... It is also fascinating to wonder whether *zero,* or metacelibacy, may be seen not as a renunciation but as an embrace of all metasex ...

The introduction of the metasexual paradigm is no less a shift in the history of our evolving understanding. The vast majority of the species has not seen past the conditioned strictures of the number *two.* And even those in the vanguard, having their orgies, still operate from the standpoint of a male-female dualism. The most sophisticated among them proclaim themselves bisexuals, not aware that this is the dead-end of that particular tunnel vision. The only way out is to go within to heal the internal split. A monad has no gender.

His biography in the book PoMoSexuals: challenging assumptions about gender and sexuality states, in part: "Marco Vassi was a literary avatar of the sexual revolution. He was deeply attuned to the politics of sex and sexual orientation, as well as the intersection of sex and spirituality. In his writing, as in his life (until his AIDS diagnosis), he explored fearlessly, bringing back dispatches from sexual frontiers most people never visited."

Vassi helped found the alternative media thinktank RainDance in 1969.

Although most of Vassi's fiction were in the genre of erotic fiction, his final novel (The Other Hand Clapping) was mainstream fiction and praised by New York Times which called it a "novel of intricate intelligence, tremendously witty and well constructed, with a plot whose tiny, focused center is like the eye of a hurricane.". About this final novel, critic Hapax Legomenon noted that "(i)n many ways it is Vassi's most conventional novel – a psychological portrait of a married couple in crisis. Not sexually explicit in the least, it still simmers with sexual tension. It is contemplative but still has drama and twists."

He died January 14, 1989, from pneumonia due to AIDS. According to the writer John Heidenry, despite his erotic explorations and adventuring, Vassi was unable to sustain a love relationship, and died alone, with only the care of his former girlfriend Annie Sprinkle. Marco is survived by his son Eric Van Johnson.

== Publishing history ==
His works have been reissued by numerous publishers over the years. In 1992, The Vassi Collection, a definitive ten-volume set of his works from Permanent Press, was published.

== Published works ==
=== Novels ===
- The Gentle Degenerates (1972)
- The Saline Solution (1972)
- Contours of Darkness (1972)
- Mind Blower (1972)
- In Touch (1975: Manor Books Inc, NY)
- Couples, Loving Couples (1977)
- The Erotic Comedies (1981)
- Lying Down: The Horizontal Worldview (1984)
- The Other Hand Clapping (1987)
- A Driving Passion (1992)
- Play Time (1992)
- The Sensual Mirror (1992)
- Tackling the Team (1993) Originally published in 1974 under the title Pro Ball Groupie.
- Devil's Sperm Is Cold (1993)
- Slave Lover (1993)

=== Autobiography ===
- The Stoned Apocalypse (1973)

=== Collections ===
- Metasex, Mirth and Madness: Erotic Tales of the Absurdly Real. Penthouse Press. (1975). This was later republished under the title Erotic Comedies.
- The Wonderful World of Penthouse Sex (1976) (editor)
- Erotica from Penthouse (1990)

=== Nonfiction ===
- Pushing Ink: The Fine Art of Tattooing (1979)

== Film ==
- Marco Vassi was interviewed in Acting Out, directed by Carl Gurevich and Ralph Rosenblum (USA, 1978)

== Bibliography ==
- Heidenry, John (1997) What Wild Ecstasy: the rise and fall of the sexual revolution. New York: Simon and Schuster. Reviewed by Robert Christgau in The New York Times, April 27, 1997.
