= Allen Edwardes =

Scholarly pen name

Allen Edwardes is the pen-name of D. A. Kinsley (born 1939), a scholar of Middle Eastern and Oriental erotica and sexual practices.

Edwardes is best known as the author of the 1959 book The Jewel in the Lotus, the introduction to which was written by the noted sexologist and prolific writer, Albert Ellis. The book, named after a famous mantra, is an amassment of sexual curiosities apparently plucked from a variety of ethnographical and orientalist sources. Throughout the book, one finds a plethora of uncontrolled generalizations concerning the sexual behaviour of non-western populations. Doubt has been cast on the sincerity of its scholarship. A recent study accuses the author of "more than a touch of prurience," and warns that "the guise of orientalist scholarship clearly gives Edwardes leeway to express a surfeit of subconscious homoerotic phantasy." As such, the book is a curious and highly specific example of a more general tendency in Western scholarship—or, in this case, rather pseudo-scholarship—which has been criticized as Orientalism by Edward Said.

Edwardes wrote a number of other books, including racy biographies of Robert Clive and Richard Francis Burton. The reviewer for Kirkus Reviews judged the Burton biography, published in 1963, to be "for sensation seekers and pseudo-intellectuals". Edwardes collaborated with R. E. L. Masters on Cradle of Erotica.

== Works ==
- The Jewel in the Lotus: A historical survey of the sexual culture in the East (ISBN 978-0-553-10289-5)
- The Cradle of Erotica: A study of Afro-Asian sexual expression and an analysis of erotic freedom in social relationships
- The Rape of India. A biography of Robert Clive and a sexual history of the conquest of Hindustan (OCLC 275089)
- Erotica Judaica : a sexual history of the Jews (OCLC 2383749)
- Death Rides a Camel : A biography of Sir Richard Burton

== Bibliography ==
- Joseph Boone, "Vacation Cruises; or, the Homoerotics of Orientalism", in: John C. Hawley ed., Postcolonial, Queer: Theoretical Intersections. SUNY Press 2001.
