= Little Man, What Now? =

Little Man, What Now? may refer to:

- Little Man, What Now? (novel), a 1932 novel by Hans Fallada
- Little Man, What Now? (1933 film), a 1933 German film, based on the novel
- Little Man, What Now? (1934 film), a 1934 American drama film directed by Frank Borzage, based on the novel
- "Little Man, What Now?" (song), a song performed by Morrissey on his album Viva Hate

== See also ==
- What Now, Little Man?, a 1959 novelette by Mark Clifton
