= Bahnhof verstehen =

German language metaphor

Bahnhof verstehen (transl. to understand "train station") derives from the German language idiomatic phrase "Ich verstehe nur Bahnhof" – I only/just understand "train station" – meaning to not be able, or perhaps not willing, to understand what is being said. It has the equivalent meaning to the English language idiom "It's all Greek to me".

== Etymology ==
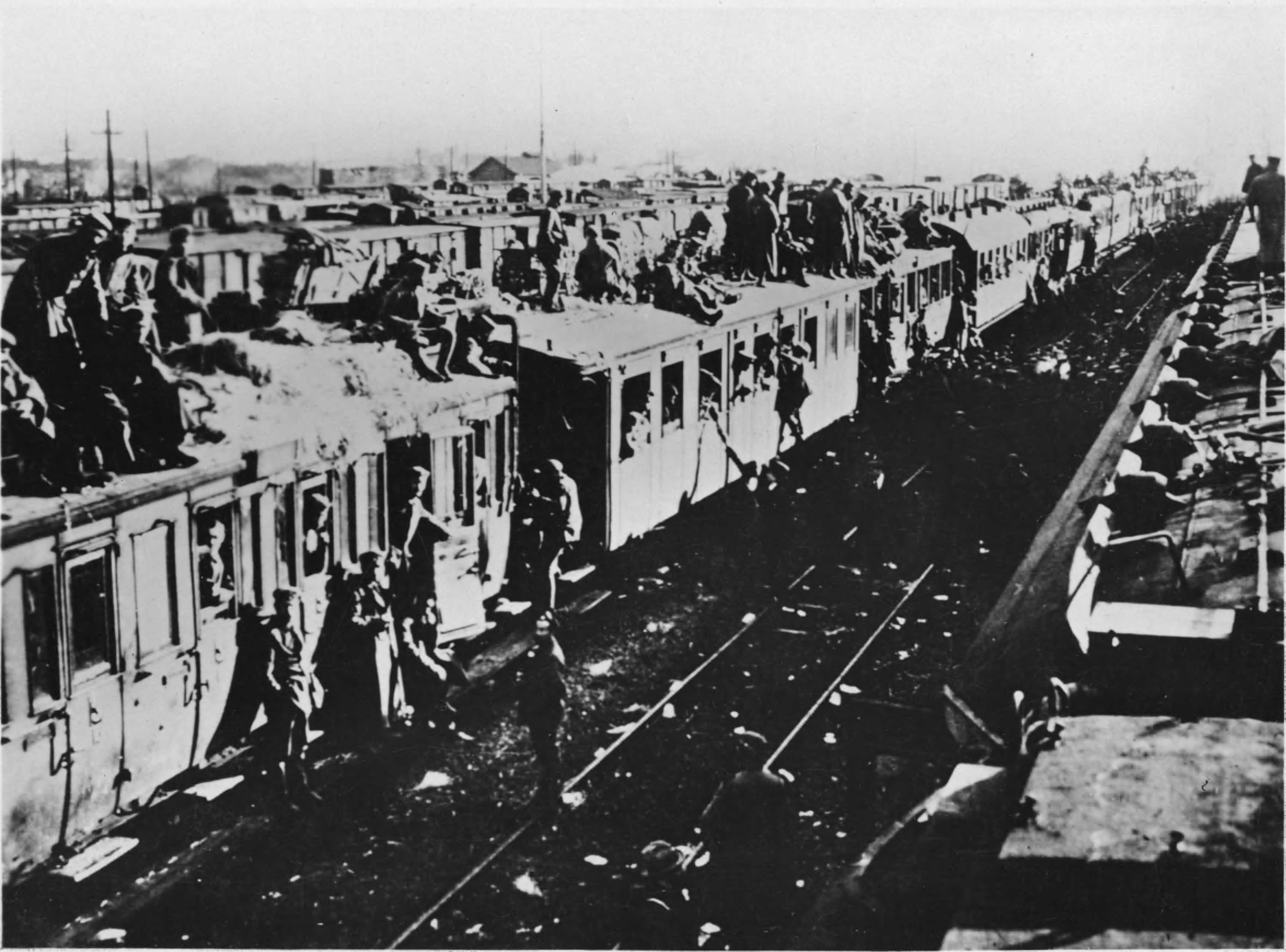
German demobilisation by train from the Western Front, 1918

The origin of the phrase, which was particularly fashionable in Berlin in the 1920s, is unclear. The dictionary Duden theorises that it was "perhaps originally said by soldiers at the end of World War I who only wanted to hear the words "train station", i.e. to be discharged and allowed to return home." A more generalised explanation is that people about to begin an anticipated journey are unable to concentrate on anything else.

== Notable uses ==
Communist Party of Germany politician Emil Höllein used the phrase in a 1923 parliamentary debate: "… ja, Sie wollen nichts hören. Wenn derartige Dinge kommen, dann hören Sie immer: Bahnhof." ["… yes, you don't want to hear anything. When things like this come up, you always hear: train station."]

Novelist Hans Fallada also incorporated the phrase in his works:

- "'Ich verstehe immer Bahnhof', sagte er. 'Bahnhof ist gar nicht so schlecht', sagte sie, 'wenn einer türmen muss'." ["'I always understand the train station", he said. 'The train station is not that bad', she said, 'when someone has to flee.'"] – Wer einmal aus dem Blechnapf frisst (1934)
- "Haben Sie etwas gesagt? Ich versteh immer Bahnhof. Hä-hä-hä. Meier belacht pflichtschuldig die gängigste Redensart der Zeit." ["Did you say something? I always understand the station. Huh-huh-huh. Meier dutifully laughs at the most popular saying of the time."] – Wolf Among Wolves (1937)
