= Young Celts =

Studio album by The MacDonald Brothers
- Released: 13 October 2008
- Recorded: Edinburgh, Scotland
- Genre: Pop, folk, Celtic
- Label: The Music Kitchen
- Producer: Stuart Wood

The MacDonald Brothers chronology
With Love (2008)	Young Celts (2008)	Merry Christmas (2009)

Young Celts is the fourth studio album by Scottish duo The MacDonald Brothers. The album was released on 13 October 2008 via Scottish independent record label The Music Kitchen. Commercially, Young Celts debuted within the top ten of the Scottish Album Chart, peaking at number eight.

== Background and recording ==
The album was preceded by three previous studio albums – The MacDonald Brothers and The World Outside – both of which were released in 2007. Commercially, both albums performed well, particularly in their native Scotland, peaking at number one and number two respectively on the Scottish Albums Charts. Their previous album, With Love, was released in February 2008 and reached number twenty-two on the Scottish Album Charts whilst failing to chart within the Top 100 of the UK Albums Charts. Commercially, Young Celts marked the return to the Top 10 of the Scottish Albums Charts for the duo, following a peak position of number eight in Scotland.

== Release and production ==
Young Celts was released on 13 October 2008 by The Music Kitchen. The album, featuring mostly Scottish songs (hence the title), featuring songs such as "Loch Lomond" and other songs such as "I'm Gonna Be (500 Miles)" (by The Proclaimers) and "Ae Fond Kiss".

The album was recorded after the release of their third album With Love which was released earlier in 2008 and once again was produced by Scottish musician and producer Stuart Wood who had served as album producer on their earlier studio albums.

== Track listing ==
1. Second Hand News
2. Flower of Scotland
3. You Can Always Come Home Son
4. I'm Gonna Be (500 Miles)
5. Turn Out the Light
6. Loch Lomond
7. So Young
8. Ae Fond Kiss
9. Me And Rose
10. Wild Mountain Thyme
11. Celtic Mantra
12. Movin' On
13. Scottish and Proud of It
14. Caledonia
15. Celtic Reel
16. Music of Spey

== Chart performance ==
Weekly chart performance for Young Celts
Chart (2007)	Peak position
Scottish Albums (OCC)	8
UK Independent Albums (OCC)	35

== See also ==
- The Macdonald Brothers
- Celtic music
- Celtic nations
  - Music of Scotland
  - Culture of Scotland
