= The World Outside =

The World Outside may refer to:

- The World Outside (The MacDonald Brothers album), 2007
- The World Outside (Eyes Set to Kill album), 2009
- World Outside, an album by the Psychedelic Furs, 1991
- Once a Jailbird, a 1934 novel by Hans Fallada also published as The World Outside
