= Georg Ludwig Meyn =

German painter (1859–1920)

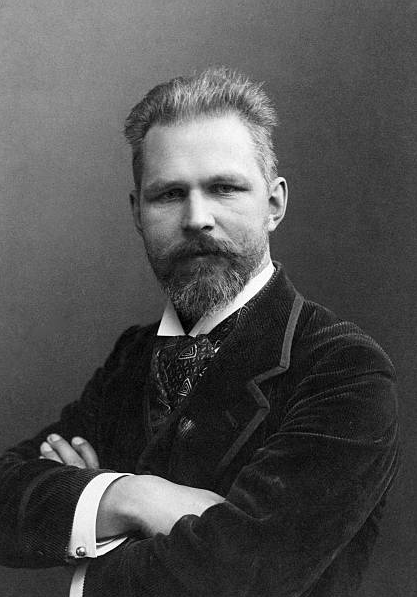
Georg Meyn, c.1900, by Wilhelm Fechner

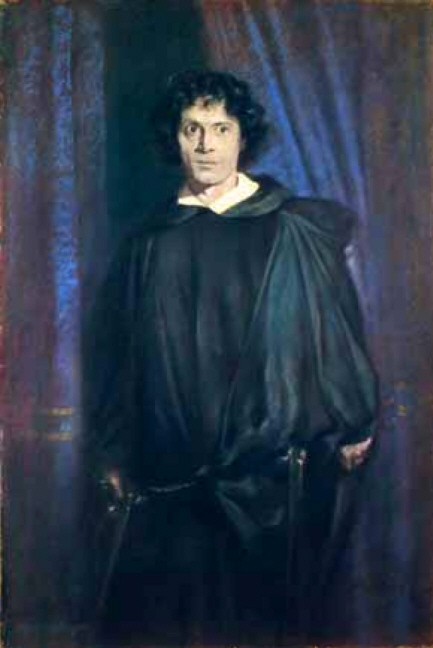
Josef Kainz as Hamlet

August Ludwig Georg Meyn (19 December 1859, Berlin - 2 February 1920, Berlin) was a German portrait and genre painter.

== Life and work ==
He began his studies at the Prussian Academy of Arts, from 1876 to 1882, where his primary instructor was the history painter, Otto Knille. Study trips later took him to Scandinavia, Belgium, Italy, France and Spain. His first major exhibition was at the Academy in 1886. He also held successful showings at the Große Berliner Kunstausstellung, in 1894 and 1897, when he was awarded a small gold medal, and at the Vienna Künstlerhaus in 1899.

He had married Johanna Eins, who was a teacher, in 1896. They would have two daughters and a son.

By the turn of the century, he had made a name for himself as a high-society portrait painter. More exhibitions followed; notably in 1900 at the Kunsthalle Bremen, and with the Berlin Secession. In 1901, he was appointed head of the painting class at the Academy, succeeding Max Koner, and was named a Professor in 1903, although he continued to paint portraits.

The following year, he was able to build a large home for his family, in Neuglobsow on the Stechlinsee. His descendants still own the home; using it for an art gallery and community meeting place. He also began making visits to the artists' colony at Ahrenshoop.

The exhibitions continued, at the Louisiana Purchase Exposition (1904), Venice Biennale (1905), where he received good critical notice for a portrait of his fellow painter, Hans Looschen, the Kunstverein in Hamburg (1906), and again at the Vienna Künstlerhaus (1909). He also became a member of the Allgemeine Deutsche Kunstgenossenschaft, and the Verein Berliner Künstler.

His students included Elisabeth Schellbach, Ottilie Kaysel, and Kurt Losch. He died at the age of sixty, and was interred at the Stahnsdorf South-Western Cemetery.

== Sources ==
- Friedrich von Boetticher: Malerwerke des neunzehnten Jahrhunderts. Beiträge zur Kunstgeschichte. Vol.IIB, Dresden 1901
- Friedrich Jansa: Deutsche bildende Künstler in Wort und Bild. Jansa, Leipzig 1912.
- 100 Jahre Berliner Kunst im Schaffen des Vereins Berliner Künstler, (exhibition catalog) Berlin 1929, pg.142
- "Meyn, Georg Ludwig", In: Allgemeines Lexikon der Bildenden Künstler von der Antike bis zur Gegenwart, Vol. 24: Mandere–Möhl, E. A. Seemann, Leipzig 1930
- Irmgard Wirth: Berliner Malerei im 19. Jahrhundert von der Zeit Friedrichs des Großen bis zum Ersten Weltkrieg. Berlin 1990, ISBN 3-88680-260-4
- Ruth Negendanck: Künstlerkolonie Ahrenshoop. Eine Landschaft für Künstler, Fischerhude 2011, pg.93 ISBN 978-3-88132-294-2
