= Philip Owen (disambiguation) =

Philip Owen may refer to:

- Philip Owen (1933–2021), mayor of Vancouver, British Columbia, 1993–2003
- Philip Wynn Owen, CB, Director General of Work and Pensions of the Department for Work and Pensions (UK) in 2008 New Year Honours
- Philip Owen (mystery writer) (1903–1989), or Philip Owen (pen name), American mystery writer

== See also ==
- Philip Owens, English poet and novelist of the 1920s and 1930s
