= Allan Blunden =

British translator

Dr Allan Blunden is a British translator who specializes in German literature. He is best known for his translation of Erhard Eppler’s The Return of the State? which won the Schlegel-Tieck Prize. He has also translated biographies of Heidegger and Stefan Zweig and the prison diary of Hans Fallada.

He lives in Liskeard, Cornwall.

== Translations ==
- Erhard Eppler, The Return of the State?
- Hans Fallada, A Stranger in My Own Country: The 1944 Prison Diary
- Oliver Matuschek, Three Lives: A Biography of Stefan Zweig
- Hugo Ott, Martin Heidegger: A Political Life
