= Iron Gustav (film) =

1958 film

- DVD cover
- Directed by: George Hurdalek
- Written by: George Hurdalek
- Produced by: Werner Fischer; Kurt Ulrich
- Starring: Heinz Rühmann; Lucie Mannheim; Karin Baal
- Cinematography: Georg Bruckbauer
- Edited by: Ingrid Wacker
- Music by: Bernhard Eichhorn
- Production companies: Berolina Film; Kurt Ulrich Filmproduktion
- Distributed by: Europa-Filmverleih
- Release date: 5 December 1958
- Running time: 102 minutes
- Country: West Germany
- Language: German

Iron Gustav (German: Der eiserne Gustav) is a 1958 West German comedy film directed by George Hurdalek and starring Heinz Rühmann, Lucie Mannheim and Karin Baal. It is based on the real story of cab driver Gustav Hartmann who drove his droshky from Berlin to Paris. The story was previously made into a novel in 1938 and later into a television series of the same title in the 1970s.

It was shot at the Tempelhof Studios in West Berlin with location shooting in the city as well as Cologne and Paris. The film's sets were designed by the art directors Hans Berthel and Karl Schneider.

== Cast ==
- Heinz Rühmann as Gustav Hartmann
- Lucie Mannheim as Frau Marie Hartmann
- Ernst Schröder as Friedrich Karl Möbius
- Karin Baal as Anni Hartmann
- Ingrid van Bergen as Gertrud Hartmann
- Ruth Nimbach as Frau Johanna Möbius
- Ludwig Linkmann as Paulchen Klinke
- Lutz Moik as Otto Kroppke
- Hilde Sessak as Frau Vietzke
- Willi Rose as Otto Vietzke
- Bruno Fritz as Amtsarzt
- Harry Meyen as Assessor

== See also ==
- List of films about horses

== Bibliography ==
- Bock, Hans-Michael & Bergfelder, Tim. The Concise CineGraph. Encyclopedia of German Cinema. Berghahn Books, 2009.
