= Ein Mann will nach oben =

Novel by Hans Fallada

- Author: Hans Fallada
- Language: German
- Publisher: Berliner Illustrirte Zeitung; Südverlag
- Publication date: 1942–1943; 1953
- Publication place: West Germany
- Pages: 607

Ein Mann will nach oben (lit. 'A Man Wants [to Rise] to the Top') is a novel by the German writer Hans Fallada. It is about a man's career in Berlin, portraying the city's different social milieus from 1909 to the early 1930s. A shortened version was serialised in 1942–1943, but World War II prevented the full novel from being published as planned. It first appeared in print in 1953. It was the basis for a 1978 television serial.

== Background ==
Ein Mann will nach oben originated when the film studio Film-Wien commissioned Hans Fallada in October 1941 to write a novel about Berlin, with the promise that it would be adapted into a major film starring Emil Jannings. It had the working title Die Eroberung von Berlin (lit. 'The Conquest of Berlin'). Fallada intended for the story to end around 1930, but was pressured by Wien-Film to add a final part set after 1933. This was similar to what happened with Fallada's Iron Gustav (1938), which also was written for a promised film adaptation that was cancelled. After the revisions requested by Wien-Film, the final version of Ein Mann will nach oben—which was then called Ein Mann will hinauf—was finished in May 1943.

== Plot ==
Karl Siebrecht is from a small town in Brandenburg. After his father dies in 1909, he moves to Berlin as a young man and experiences work in several professions over the next decades. He become acquainted with people from different social groups, including the lower-class Rieke, with whom he begins a relationship, the discharged sailor Kalli, who becomes his friend, and the upper-bourgeoise Hertha, whom he eventually marries.

== Publication ==
A version of the novel shortened to just below 250 pages was serialised in Berliner Illustrirte Zeitung from October 1942 to February 1943 under the title Die Frauen und der Träumer (lit. 'The Women and the Dreamer'). The full version was meant to be published in 1943 or 1944, but this was cancelled due to World War II. Südverlag published it posthumously in 1953 as Ein Mann will hinauf. In 1970, Rowohlt Verlag published a new edition with the title Ein Mann will nach oben.

== Reception ==
According to the scholar Geoff Wilkes, the final part is written in a way that subverts the positive message about Berlin as a centre for technology the commissioner wanted. Wilkes writes that the ending implies the main character's son likely will die early in World War II, and Rieke and Kalli seem to have made the better choice by living away from Berlin during the National Socialist period.

== Adaptations ==
The novel was the basis for the 13-part television serial Ein Mann will nach oben, directed by Herbert Ballmann and first broadcast by ZDF in 1978.

Staatsschauspiel Dresden produced a play based on the novel in 2022.
