= Rural People's Movement =

Farmers' protest movement in northern Germany from 1928 to 1933

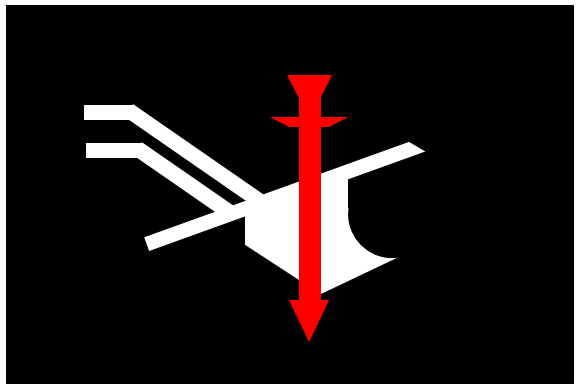
Flag of the Rural People's Movement

The Rural People's Movement (German: Landvolkbewegung) was a farmers' protest movement in northern Germany from 1928 to 1933. Due to an agricultural crisis, demonstrations took place in numerous towns and cities in early 1928, and deputations were sent to Berlin to voice grievances against trade and tax policies. Farmers' continuing financial difficulties and dissatisfaction with their own lobby organizations led to more radical protests, especially in the province of Schleswig-Holstein, from late 1928. Passive resistance included tax strikes and the obstruction of foreclosures, but some farmers, with the assistance of nationalist radicals, resorted to terrorist methods. Throughout 1929 bombs were placed in public buildings, including the Reichstag. The Rural People's Movement ran its own newspaper "Das Landvolk" which was edited by Bruno von Salomon, the brother of Ernst von Salomon. With the arrest of the bombers and many of its leaders, as well as the rise of the Nazi Party, the Landvolk declined from 1930. Claus Heim was the group's leader.

Hans Fallada's first successful novel, A Small Circus (Bauern, Bonzen und Bomben), was based on the farmers' protests, especially a demonstration and boycott of the town of Neumünster.
