= Oliver Matuschek =

German author and scholar

Oliver Matuschek is a German author and scholar, best known for his biography of the Austrian writer Stefan Zweig. Matuschek worked at the Herzog Anton Ulrich Museum in Braunschweig and at the Deutsches Historisches Museum in Berlin, where he helped to curate an exhibition on Zweig in 2008. This became the basis for his biography. The book was translated into English by Allan Blunden and was praised by reviewers.
