= Greeking =

Style of displaying or rendering text or symbols

Greeking is a style of displaying or rendering text or symbols, not always from the Greek alphabet. Greeking obscures portions of a work for the purpose of either emphasizing form over details or displaying placeholders for unavailable content. The name is a reference to the phrase "Greek to me", meaning something that one cannot understand, so that it might as well be in a foreign language.

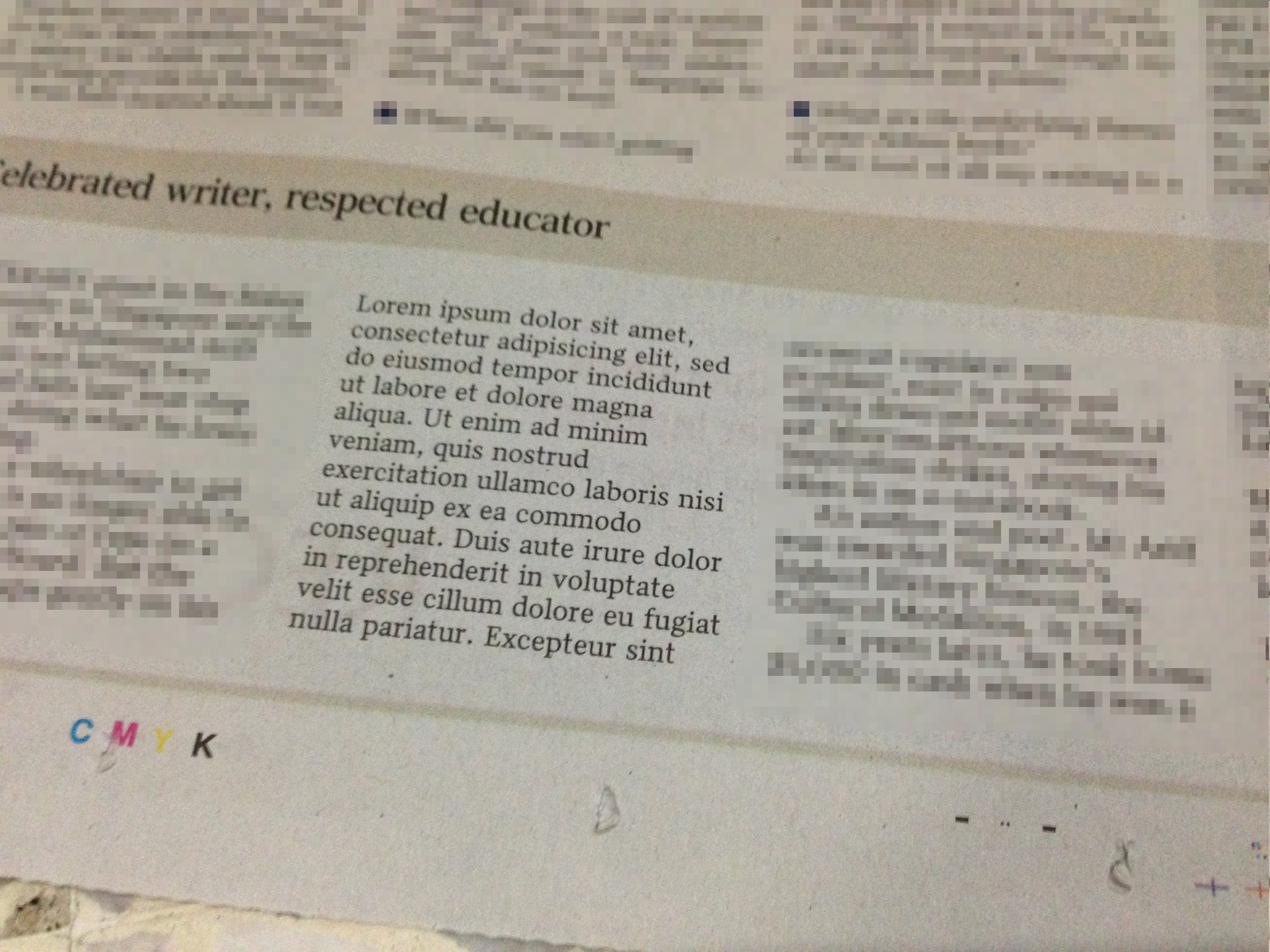
Greeking in the form of a lorem ipsum placeholder text that was inadvertently published in The Straits Times, a Singapore newspaper, on 26 April 2014

Greeked text is used in typography to evaluate a certain typeface's appropriateness, overall style or type color. In visual media, as in typography, greeking involves inserting nonsense text or, commonly, Greek or Latin text in prototypes of visual media projects (such as in graphic and web design) to check the layout of the final version before the actual text is available, or to enhance layout assessment by eliminating the distraction of readable text. Text of this sort is known as "greeked text", "dummy text", or "jabberwocky text". Lorem ipsum is a commonly used example, though this is derived from Latin, not Greek.

Because a viewer can be distracted by meaningful content, greeking unimportant text directs the viewer's focus toward layout and design. Greeking is also used when a design is being developed but the content is unfinished. One example might be the layout of a magazine article which has photographs but no text; initially, a lorem ipsum text is used, and then the nonsense text is replaced with draft versions as they become available. This allows design and layout to be carried out in parallel with content revisions.

In computing, Greeking can refer to the automatic rendering of text characters as unreadable symbols or lines in the layout preview function of word processing documents, either to speed up screen display or because the graphics display capabilities of the monitor are insufficient for rendering extremely small text.

The term "greeking" was applied by various WYSIWYG editors of the 1980s, such as ApplixWare and Island Graphics. Greeking referred to the substitution of text with a placeholder gray bar upon moving out of focus.

== In the arts ==
Greeking in theatre, television, and film production art-department work refers to the process of changing or hiding corporate trademarks that have not been "cleared" legally for use in the production.
