= The MacDonald Brothers =

Scottish pop folk duo

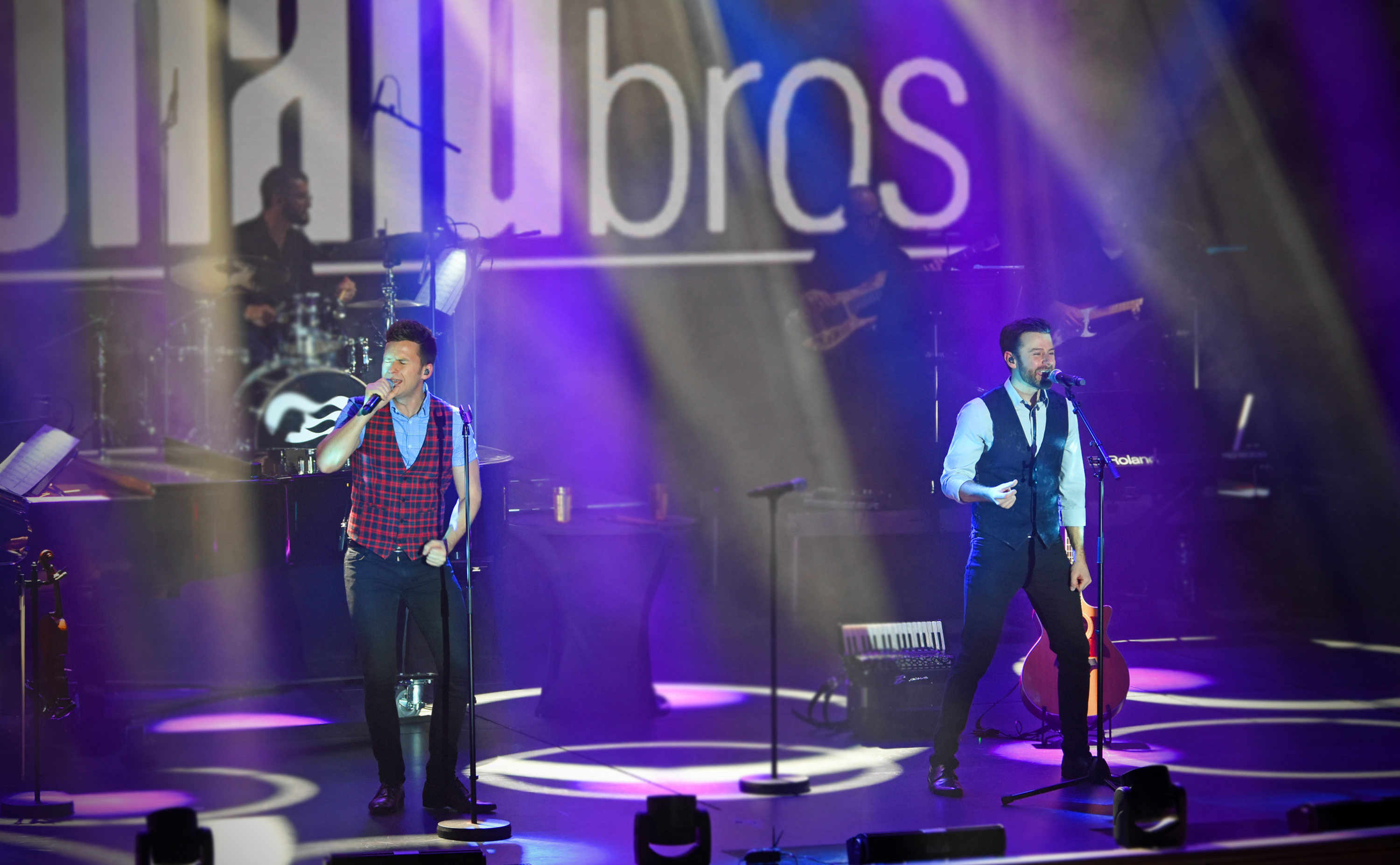
- The MacDonald Brothers performing in November 2019

Background information
- Also known as: The Macs
- Origin: Ayr, Scotland
- Genres: Pop, rock, pop rock
- Years active: 2006–present
- Labels: Syco Music, Sony Music Entertainment Evosound, The Music Kitchen
- Members: Brian MacDonald; Craig MacDonald
- Website: Official website

The MacDonald Brothers are a Scottish pop folk duo from Ayr, South Ayrshire, Scotland, consisting of brothers Brian and Craig MacDonald. They first rose to prominence in the third UK series of television talent show The X Factor in 2006 been the ninth contestant eliminated. Their debut studio album, The MacDonald Brothers (2007) topped top the charts in their native Scotland and also performed well commercially on the UK Albums Chart, peaking at number eighteen.

Their second studio album, The World Outside (2007) peaked at number two on the Scottish Album Charts and just missing a place in the top forty of the UK Album Charts, peaking at number forty-one. It featured the single "Runaway (Do You Love Me)" originally written by Elton John who later offered the song to the duo. A further two albums followed in 2008, With Love peaked at number twenty-two in Scotland, whilst their fourth studio album Young Celts debuted at number eight in Scotland, their first top ten appearance in the Scottish Album Charts since The World Outside.

The brothers are currently signed to Evosound and perform as The Macs whilst they remain living in Scotland. As well as singing, both Craig and Brian play a range of instruments including the violin, accordion, guitar and piano. Their fifth studio album, and first album under their new stage name The Macs, Strumming To Your Beat, was released in December 2013.

== Early life ==
Both Craig and Brian MacDonald were born and raised in the coastal town of Ayr, the largest settlement within South Ayrshire on the west coast of Scotland. Between the ages of five and six years old, the brothers began to attend music classes for traditional Scottish instruments which included the accordion and fiddle. They quickly began to develop their talent for such instruments, subsequently winning various awards for their playing.

Craig discovered a passion for singing at the age of fifteen, and entered school talent shows where he would impersonate Freddie Mercury. Following a new desire for singing and well as playing instruments, Craig and Brian formed The MacDonald Brothers and began to be booked to perform at various events such as parties, weddings and ceilidhs across Scotland.

== Music career ==
=== The X Factor (2006–2007) ===
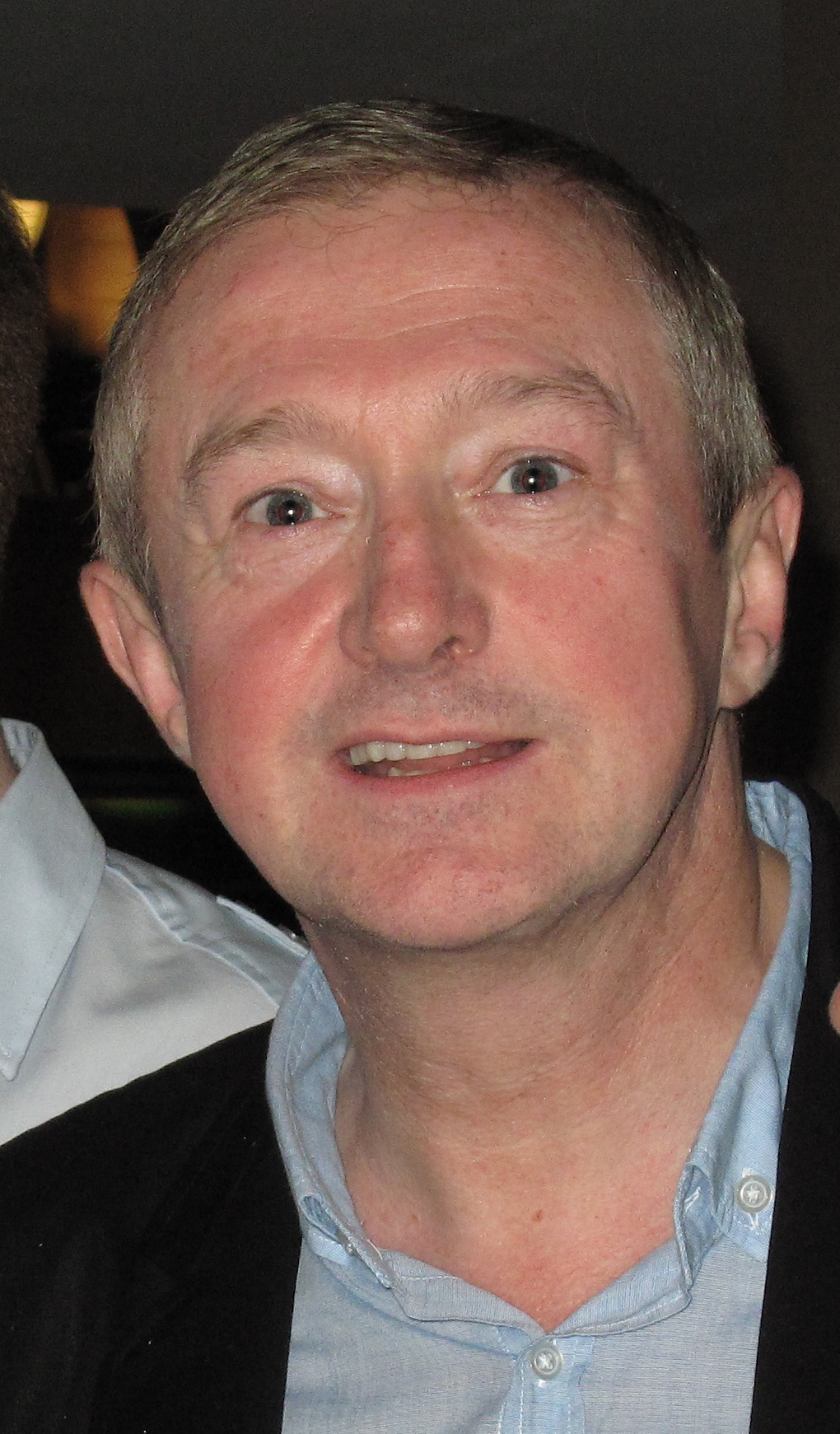
The MacDonald Brothers were mentored by Irish music manager Louis Walsh during their tenure on The X Factor

The MacDonald Brothers auditioned for The X Factor in 2006 in Glasgow, Scotland singing "Don't Worry Baby" originally by The Beach Boys, and the judges comments were positive, with Sharon Osbourne saying "You made that song not sound Californian, you made it sound Scottish ..." and Louis Walsh added "Which Was Good!". The band received three positive votes from the judges Simon Cowell, Osbourne and Walsh. Throughout the show, the boys were mentored and coached by Walsh.

The brothers were the ninth contestant eliminated, with Leona Lewis being the eventual winner. The Macdonald Brothers signed a recording contract with Syco Records, along with Sony Music Entertainment. Following this they signed with Scottish Independent label "The Music Kitchen" who released their debut album.

In 2007, The Macdonald Brothers toured the United Kingdom as part of The X Factor Live Tour. They closed the first half of the show with their most popular performances from the show, "Shang A Lang", "Cant Take My Eyes Off You" and "500 Miles". Following the conclusion of the tour, The MacDonald Brothers joined Irish boy band Westlife as the opening act for their Love Tour for the Scottish dates in Glasgow and Aberdeen.

=== The MacDonald Brothers (2007–2008) ===
After The X Factor, the band recorded their debut album, The MacDonald Brothers, which was released on 2 April 2007, produced by Stuart Wood of Scottish super group The Bay City Rollers. The album entered the UK Album Charts at No. 18. The album also charted at No. 1 on the Scottish Albums Chart outselling the likes of Kings of Leon and The Proclaimers on their week of release in Scotland. The album consisted mainly of covers including "Real Gone Kid", "Shang-A-Lang", "When You Say Nothing at All" and "Bye Bye Baby" and "500 Miles".

The MacDonald Brothers album made chart history in their native Scotland, becoming the first album to reach number one on the Scottish Albums Chart which was released through an independent Scottish record label, The Music Kitchen. The album was later released by Big–Joke records in conjunction with Sony BMG Australia for the Australasian market in 2009.

=== The World Outside and With Love (2008–2009) ===
Their second album, The World Outside was released on 15 October 2007 and included a few of the Macs own songs as well as a track "Runaway (Do You Love Me)" written and given to them by Sir Elton John.. The album peaked at No. 41 on the UK chart. It entered the Scottish album charts at No. 2, just being pipped to the post by the "Stereophonics" on the week of release. The Great Big Scottish Songbook was released on 26 May 2008 by EMI Records, and featured The MacDonald Brothers tracks as well as some of Scotland's most well known artists including KT Tunstall, The Proclaimers, Simple Minds and Runrig. In 2008, The MacDonald Brothers again joined Irish boy band Westlife on the Scottish leg of their UK Tour.

"Runaway (Do You Love Me)" was released as a download single, which was written by Elton John who later offered the song to The MacDonald Brothers following his decision not to record it himself. He later "gifted" the track to the duo for recording and release on their second album, The World Outside. Their third studio album, With Love was released on 18 February 2008, as a limited edition album for mothers day. It featured predominately love songs including "Wonderful Tonight" and "Unchained Melody." The limited copies of the album sold out within the first two weeks. The same year, they released their fourth studio album entitled Young Celts was released on 13 October 2008 which saw the duo return to their Scottish roots featuring tracks such as "Loch Lomond" and "Flower of Scotland," as well as some well known covers such as "So Young," by the Corrs. "You Can Always Come Home Son" was released as a download single. The album, distributed only in Scotland peaked at number eight on the Scottish Albums Chart.

=== Strumming To Your Beat and The Macs (2010–2024) ===
The MacDonald Brothers recorded a Christmas album entitled Merry Christmas in the summer of 2010 which featured nineteen songs including Christmas songs such as "Rockin' Around the Christmas Tree", "Last Christmas" and "Merry Christmas Everyone". Originally, Merry Christmas was recorded to go on sale exclusively during their "X-MAS" tour which ran through November and December 2010, however, the album was eventually released through digital download format only.

In 2010, the duo were invited once again for the third time to serve as support acts for Irish boy band Westlife during their Scottish dates at the Scottish Exhibition and Conference Centre (SECC) and again in 2011 where they supported Westlife at Cawdor Castle in Inverness alongside Irish girlband Wonderland.

In recent years, the band has been performing under the new stage name as "The Macs" as opposed to their former name of The MacDonald Brothers. Their first album as The Macs, but fifth studio album overall, Strumming To Your Beat was released in 2012 through the EvoSound record label. The band travelled to Nashville to record the album and worked with some of Nashvilles biggest recording producers. Their sixth studio album has been released, The Celtic Collection, which is a collection of Scottish Celtic songs.

=== Pride of Scotland Tour (2024–present) ===
Between 2014 and 2024, The MacDonald Brothers spent a considerable time overseas away from Scotland to perform in different countries, however in 2025, they are set to return to Scotland to begin a Scottish tour entitled Pride of Scotland, beginning on 20 January 2025 in Dundee. They are scheduled to perform on two Silversea Cruises between April and May 2025, as well as scheduled to perform on the MS Queen Anne on 18 May 2025.

== Artistry ==
The duos vocal harmony combined has been described as being "unique", which has earned them a reputation of being dubbed "the Scottish Everly Brothers".

== Membership ==
- Brian MacDonald – Vocals, Guitar, Piano, Accordion (2006–present)
- Craig MacDonald – Vocals, Violin (2006–present)

== Discography ==
=== Studio albums ===
Year	Album	Peak chart positions	
Year	Album	SCO	UK
2007	The MacDonald Brothers: Released: 2 April 2007; Label: Syco Music, Sony BMG, The Music Kitchen; Format: CD, digital download	1	18
2007	The World Outside: Released: 15 October 2007; Label: The Music Kitchen; Format: CD, digital download	2	41
2008	With Love: Released: 18 February 2008; Label: The Music Kitchen; Format: CD, digital download	22	–
2008	Young Celts: Released: 13 October 2008; Label: The Music Kitchen; Format: CD, digital download	8	112
2009	Merry Christmas: Released: December 2009; Label: The Music Kitchen; Format: CD, digital download	–	–
2013	Strumming To Your Beat: Released: 3 December 2013; Label: EvoSound; Format: CD, digital download	–	–

=== Singles ===
- "You Can Always Come Home Son" (2009)
- "Runaway (Do You Love Me)" (2008)
