= Hans Looschen =

German painter

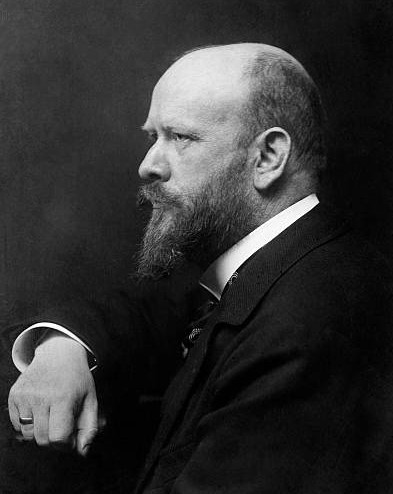
Hans Looschen, by Wilhelm Fechner (c.1900)

Hans Looschen (23 June 1859, Berlin - 11 February 1923, Berlin) was a German landscape, portrait and genre painter. He also created some illustrations.

== Life and work ==
His father, Hermann Looschen (1838-1891), was a porcelain painter at the Royal Porcelain Factory, Berlin. After graduating from a gymnasium in Charlottenburg, he began studying at the Prussian Academy of Arts. His instructors there included Paul Thumann, Otto Knille, and Ernst Hildebrand. His first exhibition took place at the academy in 1887. He became a lifetime member of the Verein Berliner Künstler (artists' association) in 1892.

In 1893, he began exhibiting regularly at the Große Berliner Kunstausstellung, and served a few terms as its president. He was awarded a small gold medal there in 1908, and a large gold medal in 1912. From 1899 to 1901, his works were presented at the Berlin Secession.

In 1908, he was also named a professor. Initially, he was a member of the Prussian State Art Commission. Later, he worked with the "Preußischen künstlerischen Sachverständigenkammer" (roughly: chamber of art experts). In 1913, he was elected to the academy, and served in its Senate until his death. The following year, he participated in the Venice Biennale. In 1916, he created a sensation when he visited the Halbmondlager, near Zossen, to paint six prisoners of war from North Africa.

He died in Berlin, at the age of sixty-three, from a heart attack.

== Selected paintings ==
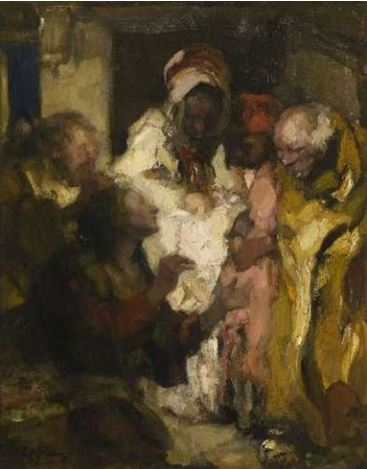
Adoration of the Magi

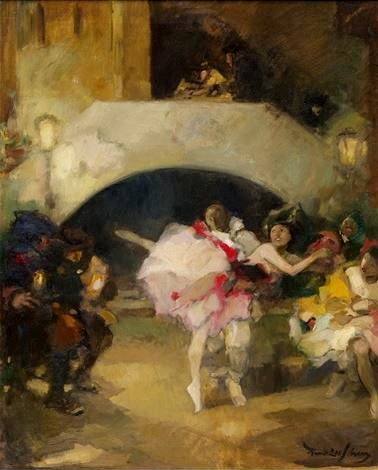
Ballet Scene

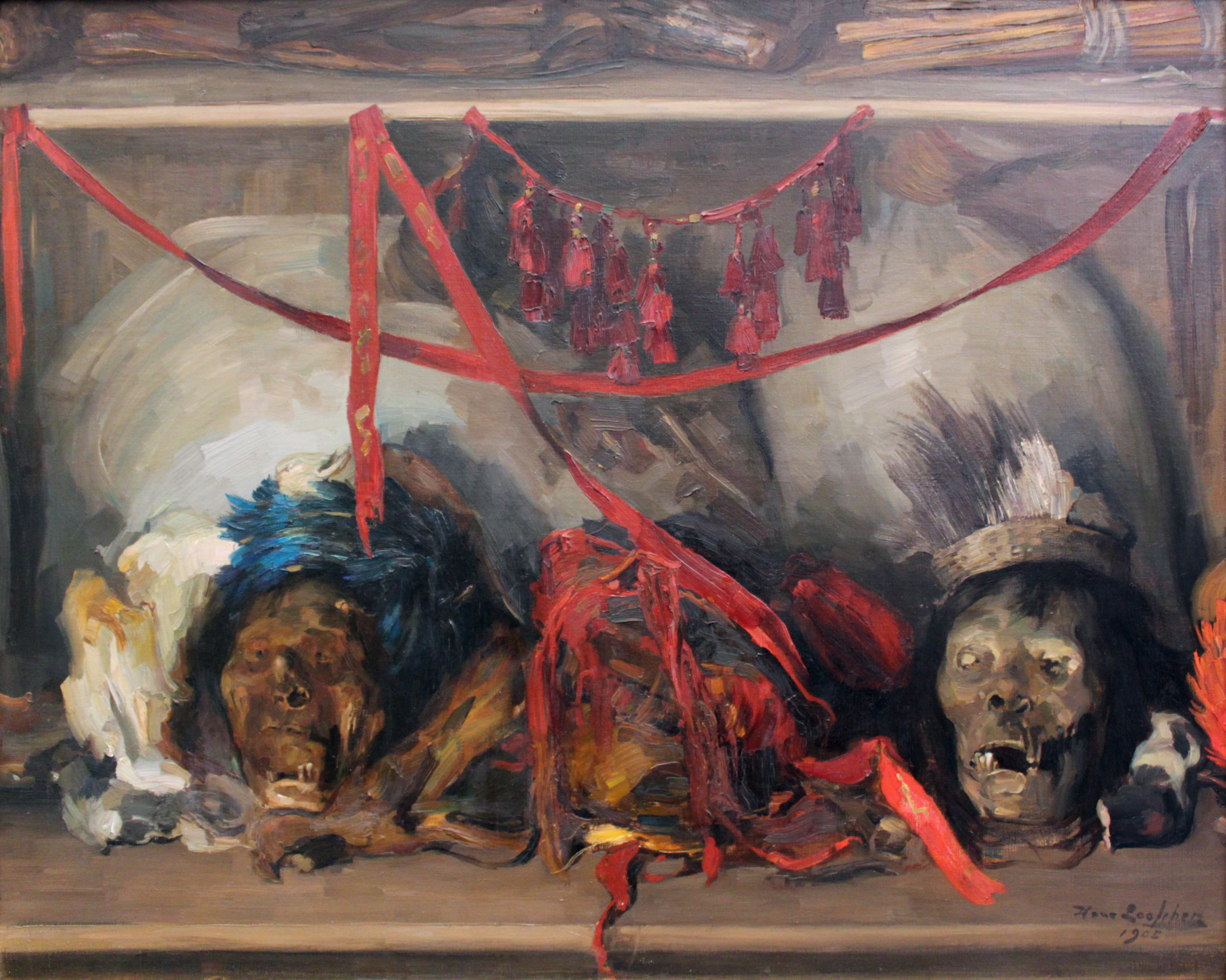
Ancient Peruvian Grave Finds

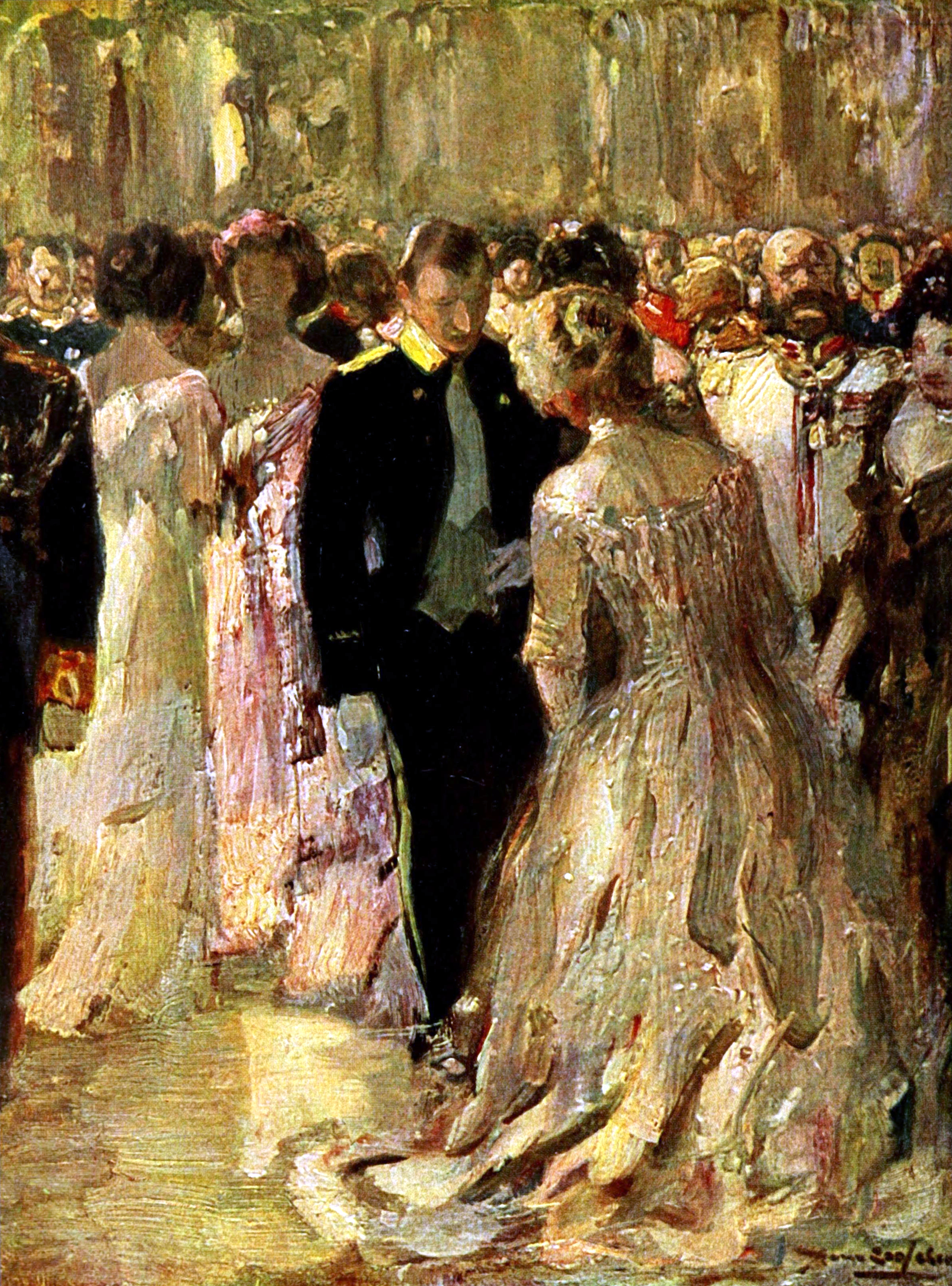
Palace Ball

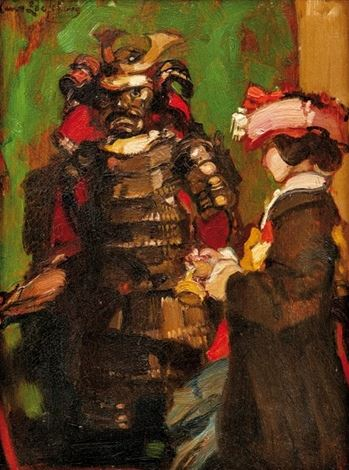
Woman Visiting the Museum
