= Kurt Losch =

German painter

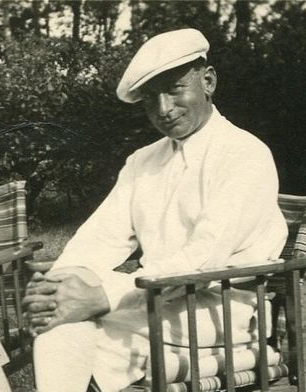
Kurt Losch (1935)

Kurt Albert Dietrich Losch (29 November 1889, in Berlin – 7 May 1944, in Berlin) was a German painter and graphic artist.

== Life and work ==
He was the second of three sons born to Reinhold Losch (1859–1927), owner of the merchandising chain, "Seifen-Losch". He completed his basic education in 1907 then, from 1909 to 1911, he attended the Royal School of Art in Berlin, where he studied art history and "drawing from life" with Wilhelm Jordan. Upon graduating, he passed the test to become a drawing teacher. He continued his studies at the Kunstakademie Königsberg with Heinrich Wolff. This was followed by a year studying portrait painting with Georg Ludwig Meyn, at what is now the Berlin University of the Arts.

He finished his work there shortly before the beginning of World War I; when he was conscripted and served as a Lieutenant. After being discharged, at the end of the war, he established himself as a free-lance painter in Berlin. From then until 1930, he was also a co-owner of his father's business which, at that time, had over 90 branches.

He was married twice. First, from 1935 to 1938, to an art student, Lore Zamzow (1913–1992). They had no children and were divorced. In 1940, he married Ursula Boltzenthal (1921–1958), the daughter of a textile merchant, with whom he had a daughter. In 1937, he created some of his most familiar works; a series of etchings depicting historical scenes of Berlin, on the occasion of its 700th anniversary.

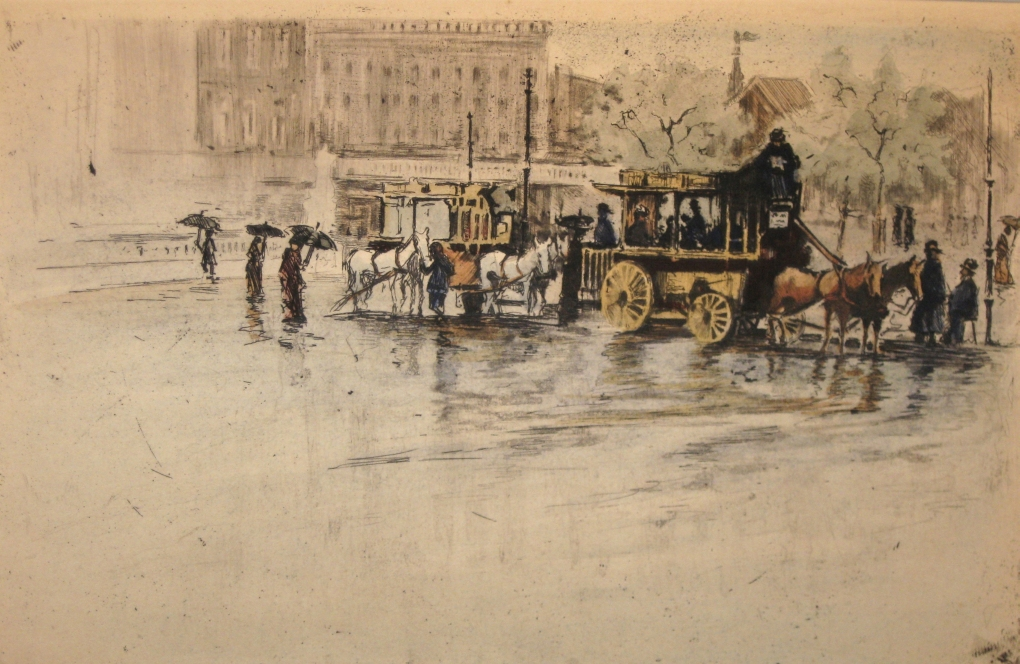
At the Hallesches Tor

In 1943, he was diagnosed with scleroderma, a rare autoimmune skin disease. He succumbed to its effects a year later, and was interred in the family gravesite at the cemetery in Luisenstadt. His widow, Ursula, remarried in 1945; to the writer, Rudolf Ditzen, better known by his pen name, Hans Fallada.
