= The Drinker (novel) =

Novel by Hans Fallada

- Author: Hans Fallada
- Original title: Der Trinker
- Translator: Charlotte and A.L. Lloyd
- Language: German
- Published: 1950 (Rowohlt Verlag) (German); 1952 (Putnam & Co. Ltd); 1994 (Aufbau-Verlagsgruppe GmbH) (German)
- Publication date: 1950
- Publication place: Germany
- ISBN: 978-1-933633-65-7

The Drinker (German: Der Trinker) is a novel by German writer Hans Fallada, first published posthumously in 1950.

Fallada began the novel in 1944, when he was imprisoned in a criminal asylum for the attempted murder of his wife. It is autobiographical, in diary form, and tells the story of a man in the grip of alcohol. Beryl Bainbridge called it "both shocking and original". Fallada wrote the manuscript in code, so as to encrypt the contents of the manuscript against detection by asylum staff and officials.
