= Graecum est, non legitur =

Inscription indicating a transcriber was unable to parse a presumed foreign-language text

The Latin expression Graecum est, non legitur – also known in the variant form Graeca sunt, non leguntur – can be found in many medieval manuscripts. It literally means “It's Greek, [hence] not readable”, and was inserted by scribes to replace Classical Greek passages present in a Latin work. In fact Ancient Greek was little known in Western Europe during the Middle Ages and, since they were not able to transcribe them, the scribes restricted themselves to pointing out the presence of those passages in the text.

According to a widespread tradition, the Florentine jurist Accursius (Accorso da Bagnolo), whenever in his public lectures came upon a line of Homer quoted in the Corpus Juris Civilis, would have said: Graecum est, nec potest legi. The phrase, however, has not been found in the published Glosses of Accursius, who, in his exposition of the Digest, as was shown by Alberico Gentili, correctly explains the large number of Greek words occurring in the text.

An anecdote will show, if not the origin of this saying, at least an occasion when it was popularly used. The story is taken from Vita et Martyrium Edmundi Campiani Martyris Angli e Societate Jesu, by the Italian Jesuit Pietro Paolo Bombino (Antverpiæ, 1618). Edmund Campion was the first Jesuit who suffered martyrdom in England. In the year 1580 he was a prisoner in the Tower of London, awaiting his trial on the capital charge of being a Jesuit. Here he engaged in a public dispute on religion with Alexander Nowell, William Day, and a large circle of Anglican ministers. One quoted a passage from the Greek New Testament, and handed the book to Campion who, after a glance, laid it aside. Convinced that their adversary had betrayed his ignorance, the ministers taunted him with “tritum in nostram inscitiam proverbium: Græcum est, non legitur”. At a later stage of the dispute, Campion was able to show that he had a perfect command of Greek and that the slight attention he had given the volume was attributable not to ignorance, but to familiarity.

The phrase has been recalled by Umberto Eco in the novel The Name of the Rose, and much earlier by Victor Hugo in The Hunchback of Notre-Dame.

== See also ==
- Greek to me
