= Wolf Among Wolves (TV series) =

1965 East German television series

Wolf Among Wolves (German:Wolf unter Wölfen) is a 1965 East German television series, based on the 1938 novel Wolf Among Wolves by Hans Fallada. It was aired in four parts on DFF. The series portrays life in the 1920s Berlin of the Weimar Republic. It was the first East German television series to air in West Germany.

== Partial cast ==
- Armin Mueller-Stahl as Wolfgang Pagel
- Wolfgang Langhoff as Rittmeister von Prackwitz
- Herbert Köfer as Gutsverwalter von Studmann
- Annekathrin Bürger as Petra Ledig
- Agnes Kraus as Frau Thumann
- Marga Legal as Frau Pagel
- Friedel Nowack as Minna
- Else Wolz as Mutter Krupaß
- Ingeborg Naß as Valuten-Vamp
- Erik S. Klein as von Zecke

== Bibliography ==
- Campbell, Russell. Marked Women: Prostitutes and Prostitution in the Cinema. University of Wisconsin Press, 2006.
