= Claus Heim =

German farmer and political activist

Claus Heim (often incorrectly spelled Klaus Heim) (born March 24, 1884, in Sankt Annen, Dithmarschen; died January 1, 1968, on his farm in Dithmarschen) was a German farmer and political activist. Alongside Wilhelm Hamkens, Heim was the most important leader of the Schleswig-Holstein Rural People's Movement (Landvolkbewegung).

== Early life ==
Claus Heim came from an old Dithmarsch peasant dynasty, the Russebullingern, an association of several families. After attending school, he went through agricultural training. Heim then went on a journey to Denmark. After that he temporarily managed part of his father's farm in St. Annen-Österfeld between Lunden and Friedrichstadt, which he had leased. In 1909 he emigrated to South America due to disagreements with his family. In Paraguay, he and a partner bought an estancia where he raised cattle that he had to defend against civil war troops. At the beginning of the Great War, in which he took part as an officer, he was just visiting Europe. After the war Heim returned to Paraguay, but the estancia was now completely in debt.

== Return to Germany and leader of the Landvolkbewegung ==
In 1923, at the age of 39, Heim returned to Germany and took over his parents' 120 hectare farm in Österfeld. In 1927 he had to sell around 40 hectares of the plant to discharge the company's debt. It is believed that this event contributed to his political radicalization.

At the turn of the year 1927 or 1928 Heim, who was already a member of the Stahlhelm, began to be more politically active, Heim was one of the initiators of the peasant demonstrations that took place on January 28, 1928, throughout Schleswig-Holstein. In Heide alone, more than 14,000 farmers demonstrated; Claus Heim himself made his first public appearance there. As an unpretentious and energetic personality, he advanced alongside the farmer Wilhelm Hamkens from Tetenbüllto, the most important leader and to the identification figure of the so-called rural people movement, which found rapid popularity against the background of the agricultural crisis of the second half of the 1920s and fueled by the gradually onset general economic crisis.

A contemporary described Heim as follows:

He was an impressive personality in every respect: a man six feet tall, broad-shouldered, with an angular head and a calm, deliberate, but determined manner of speaking. Impressive even in its peculiarities – so he was firmly convinced of a program that had come his way. One of his ancestors had played a prominent role in the struggles of the Dithmarschen peasants against feudal oppression in the Middle Ages and Heim declared that this ancestor, who was also called Claus, had reappeared in him and that he had therefore taken on the leading role in the Landvolkbewegung.

At that time Heim represented a mixture of social revolutionary and nationalist ideas. Historically, like the entire rural people movement, he placed himself in the tradition of the German Peasants' War of the 16th century. So they resorted to the black flag of the peasant wars as the symbol of the rural people, with whom one turned against seizures and reckless tax collection from peasants. While Hamkens, who was considered a brilliant speaker, stood for the moderate wing of the rural people's movement, which pursued the strategy of expressing the political discontent of the peasants through protest and civil disobedience, Heim became a symbol of radical methods and politically motivated acts of violence.

In September 1928 Heim announced publicly in the regional newspaper Heider Anzeiger that he was rejecting the existing state and would therefore no longer pay taxes ("From today on, I will no longer pay taxes!") and urged his peers to do the same. This demand met with a strong response from the north German peasantry. Heim flatly rejected the state of the Weimar Republic as a "political system that wants to destroy the free peasant". On November 19, 1928, over 200 farmers prevented the seizure of two oxen in Beidenfleth, which were to be forcibly auctioned off to pay the owner's arrears local taxes. Out of solidarity, the cattle markets in Hamburg and Altona refused to sell seized cattle.

The boycott movement of the peasants against the foreclosure of cattle and farms culminated in a series of thirteen bomb attacks that Heim and his supporters carried out on government buildings between May and September 1929. These attacks, which were primarily intended to be demonstrative, caused considerable property damage, but were designed not to kill or injure anyone. The targets of the attack included district offices, official apartments and even the editorial rooms of a newspaper that was critical of the rural people's movement. The cities of Rendsburg, Niebüll, Schleswig, Itzehoe, Lüneburg and Neumünster were affected. In addition, there was the so-called tumult of Neumünster on August 1, 1929, on the occasion of Wilhelm Hamkens' release from prison, who had been sentenced to prison for his activities in the Landvolkbewegung. Because of the brutal police action during the tumult, the town of Neumünster was boycotted by the farmers for a year.

On September 1, 1929, Claus Heim was caught by the carelessness of one of his accomplices. Besides him, more than thirty other representatives of the radical, terrorist wing of the Landvolkbewegung were arrested.

== Trial, imprisonment and release ==
From August 26 to October 31, 1930, Heim and some accomplices in the so-called Great Bombing Trial of Altona were tried. The trial, in which the accused were demonstratively uncooperative (Heim refused to speak a word in the courtroom), ended on October 31, 1930, with Heim's sentencing to seven years in prison. He and Herbert Volck received the highest sentence of the 14 defendants. Since the court saw Heim as a convict with honorable and selfless motives and he endeavored to avoid fatalities, the sentence was relatively mild. Even during his imprisonment, Heim continued to behave uncooperatively towards the "system": According to one observer, he had "the fanaticism of the revolutionary", "who only saw the accuracy of his idea confirmed in the enemy's dungeon"

Their solidarity with the prisoners home was shown above all by the respective party press of the radical anti-state parties NSDAP and KPD.

In 1931 Heim was moved to the Celle prison. There, the NSDAP made him the offer to be their top candidate in the constituency of Schleswig-Holstein in the next Reichstag elections. In the event of an election, he would have enjoyed protection from criminal prosecution as a member of the Reichstag and should have been released immediately. Heim, however, abruptly rejected this offer: Richard Scheringer reported that Heim had explained to the emissaries: "I would rather go to prison than to go to the Reichstag for you." A motive for Heim's refusal to offer is likely to have been a reward that Hitler received at the time, when the group around Heim was bombed by the NSDAP were charged with the arrest of the perpetrators. In addition, according to Scheringer, Heim rejected Hitler as a gossip he warned against.

Claus Heim also refused an offer of pardon, which was bound by his word of honor not to use force. Instead, at the beginning of 1932, the so-called Claus Heim Committee was founded on the initiative of Bruno Ernst Buchrucker, which campaigned for his release. This included the brothers Ernst and Bruno von Salomon, both of whom were also active in the Rural People's Movement, Ernst Jünger, Ernst Niekisch, the Otto Strasser's Black Front and the supporters of Walter Stennes.

Niekisch tried, initially promising, to win the imprisoned Claus Heim as a candidate of a consortium of national revolutionary groups for the election of the Reich President in 1932 and was supported in this project by Otto Strasser, Karl Otto Paetel, Erich Ludendorff, the Bund Oberland, the Wehrwolf and other groups supported. On behalf of the KPD, which feared that Heim would weaken its candidate Ernst Thälmann, Bodo Uhse managed to split the group of supporters. Heim then withdrew his willingness to run for office.

In September 1932, after almost three years in prison, Heim was released on the basis of an amnesty request by the Prussian state parliament in favor of the members of the Landvolkbewegung, which was accepted with a majority of the votes of the NSDAP, DNVP and KPD. He tried to reactivate the Landvolkbewegung with his newspaper Dusendüwelswarf, but withdrew to his farm in 1933 after the newspaper ban.

In the press and in circles of workers and peasants, Heim was still treated as a politically promising man until the early Nazi era. Alfred Kantorowicz wrote:

The Freikorpsführer Heimsoth, the rebel Ernst von Salomon, the peasant leader Klaus Heim are still in the camp of transition, but the tendency of their final decision is beyond doubt. You and thousands are avant-garde today. The signal was given by them and the final decision of the millions of people who are still hesitating, still confused, will one day follow them cannot mean anything other than proletarian revolution.

In 1933, Paetel called for the formation of a new party headed by Niekisch and Heim in the National Bolshevik Manifesto.

== Later years ==
As early as 1933 Heim was classified as "slowly becoming uncomfortable again" by the state police. In 1939 the Gauleiter of Schleswig-Holstein had Heim arrested. Only through the intervention of his brother-in-law, an influential NSDAP member, did he avoid being transported to a concentration camp. Like various other rural activists, Heim had made himself unpopular with the National Socialists through open rejection.

After the war, Heim rarely appeared in public, for example at Hamken's funeral in 1955, where he gave the funeral oration. His memories, "revised by a third party", were published in the magazine "Bauernruf" between November 26, 1965, and August 5, 1966.
