= Greek to me =

Idiom for knowledge not understandable

That's Greek to me or it's (all) Greek to me is an idiom in English referring to material that the speaker finds difficult or impossible to understand. It is commonly used in reference to a complex or imprecise verbal or written expression, that may use unfamiliar jargon, dialect, or symbols. The metaphor refers to the Greek language, which is unfamiliar to most English speakers, and additionally uses a largely dissimilar alphabet.

== Origins ==
It may have been a direct translation of a similar phrase in Latin: Graecum est, non legitur ("it is Greek, [therefore] it cannot be read"). The phrase is widely believed to have its origins among medieval scribes. While most scribes were familiar with Latin, few people in medieval Western Europe, even among the intellectual classes, were schooled in Greek. When copying classic manuscripts they would frequently encounter passages and quotations in Greek which they would have no way of translating, and as such would note the phrase in the margins.

Recorded usage of the metaphor in English traces back to the early modern period. It appears in 1599 in Shakespeare's play Julius Caesar, as spoken by Servilius Casca to Cassius after a festival in which Caesar was offered a crown:

CASSIUS: Did Cicero say any thing?

CASCA: Ay, he spoke Greek.

CASSIUS: To what effect?

CASCA: Nay, an I tell you that, I'll ne'er look you i' the face again: but those that understood him smiled at one another and shook their heads; but, for mine own part, it was Greek to me. I could tell you more news too: Marullus and Flavius, for pulling scarfs off Caesar's images, are put to silence. Fare you well. There was more foolery yet, if I could remember it.

— William Shakespeare, The Tragedy of Julius Caesar (1599)

Here, Casca's literal ignorance of Greek is the source of the phrase, using its common meaning to play on the uncertainty among the conspirators about Cicero's attitude to Caesar's increasingly regal behaviour.

Shakespeare was not the only author of this period to use the expression. It was also used in 1603 by Thomas Dekker in his play Patient Grissel:

FAR: Asking for a Greek poet, to him he fails. I'll be sworn he knows not so much as one character of the tongue.
RIC: Why, then it's Greek to him.

— Thomas Dekker, Patient Grissel (1603)

The expression is almost exclusively used with reference to the speaker (generally "Greek to me"); Dekker's "Greek to him" is rare.

== Variations ==
Other languages have similar formulations, some referring to Greek but many referring to foreign languages such as Chinese or Spanish. Many refer to a language with a different alphabet or writing system.

This is an example of the usage of demonyms in relation to the ability of a people to be understood, comparable to the development of the words barbarian (one who babbles), Nemec (Slavic for "the mute one," indicating Germans).

In an article published by Arnold L. Rosenberg in the language journal Lingvisticæ Investigationes, he claimed that there was a popular "consensus" that Chinese was the "hardest" language, since various non-English languages most frequently used the Chinese language in their equivalent expression to the English idiom "it's all Greek to me". David Moser of the University of Michigan Center for Chinese Studies reached a similar conclusion.

Language	Phrase	Pronunciation	Translation	Target language / meaning
English	It's Double Dutch.			Dutch
English	That's Greek to me.			Greek
English	Chicken scratch.			illegible writing
Albanian	Mos fol kinezçe.		Do not speak Chinese.	Chinese
Afrikaans	Dis Grieks vir my.		It's Greek to me.	Greek
Arabic	يتحدث باللغة الصينية	yataḥaddaṯ bil-luġah aṣ-Ṣīnīyah [jataˈħadːaθ bɪlˈluɣa asˤːiːˈniːja]	He's speaking Chinese.	Chinese; The verb in the example can be conjugated in other forms.
Arabic, Syrian Colloquial	يحكي كرشوني	yaḥki Karšūni [ˈjaħki karˈʃuːni]	He's speaking Syriac.	Syriac, using the Garshuni (Arabic) script as a reference to it. The verb in the example can be conjugated in other forms.
Arabic, Egyptian Colloquial	بيتكلم بالهندي	byatkallam bel-hendi [bjætˈkælːæm belˈhendi]	He's speaking Hindi.	Hindi; The verb in the example can be conjugated in other forms.
Asturian	Suename chinu Ta'n chinu.		It sounds like Chinese to me. It's in Chinese.	Chinese
Azerbaijani	Erməni budaq cümləsi	[eɾmæˌni buˈdɑx d͡ʒymlæsi], [eɾmæˌni buˈdɑx d͡zymlæsi]	Armenian subordinate clause	Armenian
Bulgarian	Все едно ми говориш на патагонски.	Vse edno mi govoriš na patagonski. [fsɛ ɛdˈnɔ mi ɡɔˈvɔriʃ na pataˈɡɔnskʲi]	It's as if you're talking in Patagonian.	"Patagonian" (not a real language)
Cantonese	鬼畫符 / 鬼画符	gwai2 waak6 fu4 [liː˥ kɔ˧ hɐi˨ mɐi˨ kwɐi˧˥ waːk̚˨ fuː˨˩ aː˧]	Ghost script?	No specific set phrase, treated like any ordinary language, eg. "Is this ghost script?" "Is this written in Martian?"
Cantonese	火星話 / 火星话	fo2 sing1 waa6 [fɔ˥ sɪŋ˨ waː˧]	Martian	No specific set phrase, treated like any ordinary language, eg. "Is this ghost script?" "Is this written in Martian?"
Catalan	Com si diguessis Llúcia	[kom si di'ɣes:is 'ʎusiə]	As if you say Lucy; not referring to a language	
Cebuano	Linatin		Latin	Latin, a language used in rituals by holy men such as Catholic priests, faith healers, and talisman owners.
Cebuano	Ininsik		Chinese	Chinese
Chavacano	Aleman ese comigo.		It's German to me.	German
Croatian	To su za mene španska sela.	[tô su za měne ʃpǎːnska sêla]	[This is] "like a Spanish village".	Spanish
Czech	To je pro mě španělská vesnice.	[ˈto jɛ ˈpro mɲɛ ˈʃpaɲɛlskaː ˈvɛsɲɪtsɛ]	This is a Spanish village to me.	Spanish
Czech	Mluvím čínsky?	[ˈmluviːm ˈtʃiːnskyː]	Am I speaking Chinese?	
Czech	Vidím jen rozsypaný čaj.	[ˈvidim jɛn ˈrozsɪpaniː tʃaj]	I only see spilled tea.	Asian languages without the Latin script
Danish	Det rene volapyk.	[te̝ ˈʁeˀnə volɑˈpʰyk]	[This is] pure Volapük.	Volapük, a 19th century constructed language
Danish	Det er en by i Rusland.		This is a town in Russia.	Russian
Danish	Kaudervælsk		Romansh	Romansh, a Rhaeto-Romance language spoken in Switzerland
Danish	Det er græsk for mig.		It is Greek to me.	Greek
Dutch	Dat is Chinees voor mij.	[ˈdɑt ɪs ɕiˈneːs foːr ˈmɛi]	That is Chinese to me.	Chinese
Dutch	Ik snap er geen jota van.		I don't understand one iota of it. Reference to Matthew 5:18.	Greek
Esperanto	Tio estas volapukaĵo.	[[ˈtio ˈestas volapuˈkaʒo]]	It's all Volapük.	Volapük, a 19th century constructed language
Estonian	See on mulle hiina keel.		This is Chinese to me.	Chinese
Filipino	Parang Intsik		It looks like Chinese.	Chinese
Finnish	Täyttä hepreaa.	[ˈtæy̯tːæ ˈhepreɑː]	It's all Hebrew.	Hebrew
Finnish	Kuulostaa siansaksalta		Sounds like pig's German	gibberish
Finnish	harakanvarpaita (refers to undecipherable writing)		Magpie's toes	unintelligible writing (gibberish)
French	C'est du chinois. C'est de l'hébreu C'est du javanais. C'est du russe. C'est du sanskrit.	[s‿ɛ dy ʃinwa] [s‿ɛ də l‿ebʁø] [s‿ɛ dy ʒavanɛ] [s‿ɛ dy ʁys] [s‿ɛ dy sɑ̃s.kʁi]	It's Chinese. It's Hebrew. It's Javanese. It's Russian. It's Sanskrit.	Chinese; Hebrew; Javanese; Russian; Sanskrit
German	Das kommt mir spanisch vor.		That sounds like Spanish to me. (usually meant to indicate something is fishy)	Spanish
German	Spreche ich Chinesisch?		Am I speaking Chinese?	Chinese
German	Fachchinesisch		specialty Chinese (meaning technical jargon)	Chinese
German	Kauderwelsch		Consisting of "kauder" and "welsch". The exact meaning of "kauder" is unclear, there are different explanations: from a verb meaning "to trade". The whole compound would then refer to the language spoken by Italian traders.; a corruption of Kauer, the Tyrolean form of Chur, therefore the Romance language of Chur.; from an Early Modern German word for tow. Kauderwelsch would then pejoratively refer to Italian tow traders.; Any of the explanations above would've been reinforced by the Upper German verb "kudern, kaudern" for "speaking unintelligible".	Italian or Rhaeto-Romance.
German	Das sind böhmische Dörfer für mich	[ˌbøːmɪʃə ˈdœʁfɐ]	These are Bohemian villages to me	Czech, Bohemia being a region of the neighbouring Czech Republic that is nearest to Germany.
German	Ich verstehe nur Bahnhof		All I understand is "train station."	
German	Polnisch rückwärts		Polish [spoken] in reverse	Polish
Greek, Standard Modern	Αυτά μου φαίνονται κινέζικα.	[afˈta mu ˈfenɔːnde ciˈnezika]	This strikes me as Chinese	Chinese
Greek, Standard Modern	Αυτά μου φαίνονται αλαμπουρνέζικα.	[afˈta mu ˈfeno(n)de ala(m)burˈnezika]	These seem to me gobbledygook.	"Alaburnese" (similar to gibberish)
Greek, Cypriot	Εν τούρτζικα που μιλάς;	[e‿ˈⁿduɾ̥t͡ʃi̞kɐ p̬u mi↗ˈlɐs]	Are you speaking Turkish?	Turkish
Hebrew	זה סינית בשבילי	[ze sinit biʃvili]	It's Chinese to me!	Chinese
Hindi, Urdu	क्या मैं फ़ारसी बोल रहा हूँ? کیا میں فارسی بول رہا ہوں؟	Kyā maĩ fārsī bol rahā hū̃?	Am I speaking Persian?	Persian
Hungarian	Ez nekem kínai.	[ˈɛz ˈnɛkɛm ˈkiːnɒi]	It's Chinese to me.	Chinese
Icelandic	Þetta kemur mér spánskt fyrir sjónir.		This looks like Spanish to me.	Spanish
Icelandic	Þetta er hebreska fyrir mér.		It’s Hebrew to me.	
Indonesian	(Tulisan) Cakar ayam		Chicken feet	gibberish Refers to unreadable writing.
Indonesian	Bahasa planet		(Other-)planet language	alien language
Italian	Parlare arabo/aramaico/ostrogoto/turco/cinese	[parlaːre ˈaːrabo], [araˈmaiko], [ostroˈɡɔːto], [tˈturko], [ttʃiˈneːze]	To speak Arabic/Aramaic/Ostrogoth/Turkish/Chinese	Arabic, Aramaic, Ostrogoth, Turkish, Chinese
Javanese	ꦕꦺꦏꦺꦂꦥꦶꦛꦶꦏ꧀	[t͡ʃɛkɛr piʈɪˀ]	Chicken scratch	illegible handwriting
Javanese	ꦧꦱꦮꦭꦺꦴꦟ꧀ꦝ	[bʰɔsɔ walɔɳɖɔ]	Dutch language	Dutch
Korean	횡설수설하고 있다	Hoengseolsuseolhago itta	They are speaking horizontally and vertically.	gibberish, especially for unrecognizable spoken language or incoherence.
Korean	괴발개발 (refers to unreadable writing)	Goebalgaebal	Cat's footprints and dog's footprints	gibberish
Korean	아무 말이나 한다	Amu marina handa	They are speaking out random words.	gibberish
Korean	외계어를 한다	Oegyeeoreul handa	They are speaking in an alien language.	alien language
Korean	개소리를 한다	Gaesorireul handa	They are making a dog's sound. (pejorative)	gibberish
Latin	Graecum est; nōn legitur	[ˈɡrae̯kum est noːn ˈleɡitur]	[It] is Greek; [it is] not legible/[it is] illegible	Greek
Latvian	Tā man ir ķīniešu ābece	[taː man ir ciːnieʃu aːbetse]	This is Chinese alphabet book to me	Chinese
Lithuanian	Tai man kaip kinų kalba.	[taɪ mɐn kaɪp kinuˑ kɐlba]	It's Chinese to me	Chinese
Lithuanian	Paukščių kalba.		Bird's language	gibberish
Lojban	ti itku'ile ga'a mi		It's Ithkuil to me	Ithkuil
Macedonian	За мене тоа е шпанско село.	Za mene toa e špansko selo. [za mɛnɛ tɔa ɛ ʃpaŋskɔ sɛlɔ]	It is for me a Spanish village.	Spanish
Malay	(Tulisan) Cakar ayam		Chicken feet	gibberish Refers to unreadable writing.
Malayalam	Ivan enthu thengayanu parayunne? (or Enthu thengayanu parayunnathu? / Enth thengaya ith?)	ഇവൻ എന്ത് തേങ്ങയാണ് പറയുന്നേ? (എന്ത് തേങ്ങയാണ് പറയുന്നത്? / എന്ത് തേങ്ങയാ ഇത്?)	What coconut is he saying? (What coconut is this?)	What nonsense is he talking about? / Gibberish. In colloquial Malayalam, thenga (coconut) is used sarcastically to denote nonsense, absurdity, or unintelligible speech. The idiom is also often calqued into Indian English as "What coconut!" (notably adopted by historian Manu S. Pillai for his social media moniker @WaatCoconut).
Maltese	Kollu Ċiniż għalija.		It's all Chinese to me.	Chinese
Mandarin	天書/ 天书。	tiān shū [tʰjɛn˥ ʂu˥]	book from Heaven	"Heaven's language" Refers to an unknown writing system, or incomprehensible content, cf. A Book from the Sky.
Mandarin	鬼畫符 / 鬼画符	guǐhuàfú [kwei˨˩ hwa˥˩ fu˧˥]	ghost-drawn marks	"ghost language" Refers to very poor, incomprehensible handwriting.
Mandarin	鳥語。/ 鸟语	Niǎoyǔ [njɑʊ̯˧˥ y˨˩]	bird language.	"bird language" (bird song); Refers to incomprehensible speech.
Mandarin	火星文	Huǒxīng wén [xwɔ˨˩ ɕiŋ˥ wən˧˥]	Martian writing	"Martian"; Usually refers to comically unconventional writing, but is also often used in the same context of unintelligible words or text.
Marathi	मी हिब्रू बोलतो का?	Mī hibrū bōlatō kā	Am I speaking Hebrew?	Hebrew
Low Saxon	Dat kümmt mi spaansch vör.	[dat kymt miː spoːnʃ føɐ]	That seems like Spanish to me.	Spanish
Norwegian	Det er helt gresk for meg.		It's complete Greek to me	Greek
Persian	مگه ترکی حرف میزنم؟	[mæge torkiː hærf miːzænæm]	Am I speaking Turkish?	Turkish
Polish	To dla mnie chińszczyzna.	[ˈtɔ dla ˈmɲɛ xʲij̃ˈʂtʂɨzna]	To me it's Chinese	Chinese
Polish	Siedzieć jak na tureckim kazaniu	[ˈɕɛdʑɛtɕ ˈjak na tuˈrɛtskʲim kaˈzaɲu]	Sit as in a Turkish sermon	Turkish
Polish	Czeski film	[ˈtʂɛskʲi ˈfilm]	Czech movie (this one refers to an incomprehensible situation rather than words, coined after a wave of absurdist movies in Czech cinematography)	Czech
Portuguese	Isto para mim é chinês.	[ˈiʃtu pɐɾɐ ˈmĩ ɛ ʃiˈneʃ]	This is Chinese to me	Chinese (Portugal)
Portuguese	Isto para mim é grego.	[ˈiʃtu pɐɾɐ ˈmĩ ɛ ˈɣɾeɣu]	This is Greek to me	Greek (Portugal)
Romanian	Parcă e chineză.	[ˈparkə je kiˈnezə]	It's like Chinese.	Chinese
Romanian	Ești turc?	[jeʃtʲ ˈtuɾk]	Are you Turkish?	Turkish
Romanian	Nu înțeleg o iotă.	[nu ɨnt͡seˈleɡ o ˈjotə]	I don't understand one iota of it. Reference to Matthew 5:18.	Greek
Russian	Это для меня китайская грамота.	Eto dlja menjá kitájskaja grámota. [ˈɛtə ˈdʲlʲæ mʲɪˈnʲæ kʲɪˈtajskəjə ˈɡramətə]	That's Chinese writing to me.	Chinese, but emphasis is put on reading rather than speaking. The phrase is often applied when not understanding branches of knowledge like chemistry, maths or computing due to lack of familiarity.
Russian	Как курица лапой.		Like [scribbled by] chicken feet.	gibberish Refers to very poor, incomprehensible handwriting.
Serbian	То су за мене шпанска села. To su za mene španska sela.	[to su za mene ʃpanska sela]	These are to me a Spanish village.	Spanish
Serbian	К'о да кинески причаш. K'o da kineski pričaš.		Like speaking in Chinese	Chinese
Slovak	To je pre mňa španielska dedina.	[to je pre mɲa ʃpaɲielska ɟeɟina]	That is a Spanish village to me.	Spanish
Slovene	To mi je španska vas	[ˈtóː mi jɛ ˈʃpáːnska ˈʋáːs]	That is a Spanish village to me.	Spanish
Spanish	Está en chino/arameo/ruso. Me suena a chino/arameo/ruso.	[esˈta en ˈtʃino], [aɾaˈmeo] [me ˈswena a ˈtʃino], [aɾaˈmeo]	This is in Chinese/Aramaic/Russian. It sounds like Chinese/Aramaic/Russian to me.	Chinese, Aramaic, Russian
Spanish	No entiendo ni jota	[no enˈtjendo ni ˈxota]	I don't understand one iota of it. Reference to Matthew 5:18.	Greek
Swedish	Det är rena (rama) grekiskan Det låter som.		It is pure Greek; It sounds like Greek.	Greek
Swedish	(Jag fattar) inte ett jota		(I don't understand) one iota of it Reference to Matthew 5:18.	Greek
Turkish	Konuya Fransız kaldım.	[konuja fɾansɯz kaɫˈdɯm]	I was left French to the topic.	French, as from the viewpoint of a French person who doesn't understand any Turkish.
Turkish	Anladıysam Arap olayım.	[anɫaˈdɯjsam aˈɾap oɫajɯm]	let me blacken, get dark skin ("turn into Arab") if I understood it (in Turkish "Arap olayım" is used in idioms in similar sense to "God strike me down if ...", to emphasize that something is not true) (informal, old-fashioned, offensive)	None (Arab doesn't refer to nationality or language, but skin color)
Ukrainian	Це для мене китайська грамота.	Tse dlja mene kitajs'ka gramota. [ˈtsɛ dʲlʲɐ ˈmɛne kɪˈtɑjsʲkɐ ˈɦrɑmotɐ]	That's Chinese writing to me.	Chinese
Ukrainian	Як курка лапою		As if [written by] chicken feet	
Venetian	Par mi xe turco.	[paɾ ˈmi ˌzɛ ˈtuɾko]	To me this is Turkish.	Turkish
Vietnamese	Nhìn/nghe như tiếng Miên.		(It) looks/sounds like Khmer	Khmer
Yiddish	תּרגום־לשון טערקיש אָץ־קוצץ־לשון מלאָכים־לשון חרטמים־לשון	targem-loshn terkish ots-koytsets-loshn malokhim-loshn khartumim-loshn	targum language (i.e. that of Aramaic translations of the Bible); Turkish gibberish the language of angels the language of a pharaoh's magicians (i.e. hieroglyphics)	Aramaic / Turkish / gibberish / angelic language / Hieroglyphics

== See also ==
- Greeking
- Gringo, originally meaning a foreign language as unintelligible as Greek
