= A Small Circus =

1931 novels by Hans Fallada

- Author: Hans Fallada
- Original title: Bauern, Bonzen und Bomben
- Translator: Michael Hofmann
- Language: German
- Publisher: Vier Falken
- Publication date: 1931
- Publication place: Germany
- English publication date: 2012
- Pages: 622

A Small Circus (German: Bauern, Bonzen und Bomben, lit. 'Farmers, Bigwigs and Bombs') is a 1931 novel by the German writer Hans Fallada.

== Plot ==
The novel depicts tensions in a German small town in the summer of 1929. It covers opportunistic local journalism, farmers plotting violence, street fighting between communists and nationalists, and a corrupt mayor. It was partially inspired by Fallada's experience as a newspaper journalist and the history of the Rural People's Movement.

== Reception ==
The novel was Fallada's first serious critical success. Those who praised it upon the original publication included Hermann Hesse, Robert Musil and Joseph Goebbels. In 2012, Ben Hutchinson of The Guardian wrote that it "vividly depicts the provincial politics and internecine squabbling of the Weimar republic", making it a more representative example of Fallada's works than Every Man Dies Alone (1947), which later became his internationally most famous novel.

== Adaptations ==
Fallada and the actor and director Heinz Dietrich Kenter wrote a stage adaptation of the novel in 1931. It was never produced but the manuscript was published in 1932 as Bauern, Bonzen und Bomben (Die schwarze Fahne). Schauspiel in 5 Akten.

The novel was the basis for the television serial Bauern, Bonzen und Bomben, broadcast in five episodes on ARD in 1973.
