= Philip Owens =

Philip Owens (1901–1945) was an English poet, novelist, translator and editor of the 1920s and 1930s. He appears in the 1930 anthology European Caravan, edited by Samuel Putnam, which also introduced much of the world to Jacob Bronowski, William Empson, and Samuel Beckett. He was a frequent contributor to Jack Lindsay's literary journal, The London Aphrodite. He is also the author of a novel, Hobohemians, and the editor of Bed and Sometimes Breakfast: An Anthology of Landladies.

Owens translated Hans Fallada's novels Wolf Among Wolves (1937) and Iron Gustav (1938) into English for Putnam.

He was killed in June 1945 while serving in the Intelligence Corps during the Greek Civil War.

== Works ==
- Picture of nobody, with a foreword by Allen Bratton, New York : McNally Editions, 2026, Originally published in 1936, ISBN 978-1-961341-88-3
- Hobohemians : a study of luxurious poverty, München, Penhaligon Press 2026, first published in 1929 by the Mandrake Press, ISBN 978-1-914076-55-8
