= Iron Gustav (TV series) =

1979 West German television series

- Genre: Comedy drama
- Based on: Iron Gustav by Hans Fallada
- Written by: Herbert Asmodi
- Directed by: Wolfgang Staudte
- Starring: Gustav Knuth
- Composer: Friedrich Scholz
- Country of origin: West Germany
- Original language: German
- No. of series: 1
- No. of episodes: 7

Production
- Producers: Hans Hirschmann; Gunther Malzacher
- Cinematography: Immo Rentz
- Running time: 60 minutes
- Production company: Südwestfunk

Original release
- Network: ARD
- Release: 27 August – 8 October 1979

Iron Gustav (German: Der eiserne Gustav) is West German television series which originally aired on ARD in seven episodes between 27 August and 8 October 1979. It is based on the 1938 novel Iron Gustav by Hans Fallada about a Berlin taxi driver still using a horse-drawn carriage, and the hardships he faces due to increasing competition from motor cars in the Weimar Era. In 1928 to demonstrate what he can still do he takes his carriage from Berlin to Paris.

== Main cast ==
- Gustav Knuth as Gustav Hackendahl
- Eva Brumby as Grete Hackendahl
- Eos Schopohl as Eva Hackendahl
- Volker Lechtenbrink as Erich Hackendahl
- Michael Kausch as Heinz Hackendahl
- Erika Skrotzki as Gertrud Gudde
- Manfred Lehmann as Eugen Bast
- Dagmar Biener as Sophie Hackendahl
- Peter Eschberg as Dr. Pasolt
- Inge Landgut as Mutter Quaas
- Gabriele Schramm as Irma Hackendahl
- Rainer Hunold as Wilhelm Hackendahl
- Valérie de Tilbourg as Tinette Blanc
- Herbert Steinmetz as Schuldirektor
- Käthe Haack as Marlene
- Heinz Meier as Herr Tümmel
- Brigitte Mira as Frau Pauli
- Günter Strack as Bankdirektor Hoppe
- Michael Nowka as Erich Menz

== Bibliography ==
- Bock, Hans-Michael & Bergfelder, Tim. The Concise CineGraph. Encyclopedia of German Cinema. Berghahn Books, 2009.
- Rentschler, Eric. German Film & Literature. Routledge, 2013.
