= Iron Gustav =

1938 novel by Hans Fallada

- Author: Hans Fallada
- Original title: Der eiserne Gustav
- Translator: Philip Owens
- Language: German
- Publisher: Rowohlt Verlag
- Publication date: 1938
- Publication place: Germany
- English publication date: 1940
- Pages: 737

Iron Gustav: A Berlin Family Chronicle (German: Der eiserne Gustav) is a 1938 novel by the German writer Hans Fallada. It is about the Berlin coachman Gustav Hackendahl, nicknamed Iron Gustav, who struggles with his failing family life, career and country during World War I and the interwar period. The main character is based on the real person Gustav Hartmann.

The novel was the basis for a 1958 film, and the West German television series Iron Gustav which premiered on ARD in 1979.
