= Hugo Ott =

German historian and academic (1931–2022)

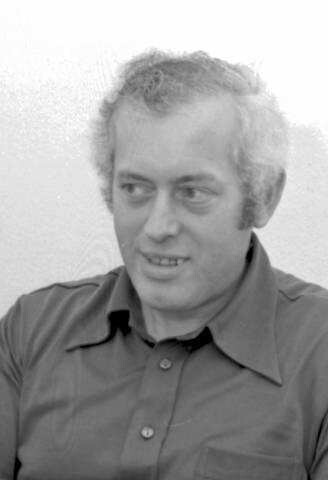
- Born: 20 August 1931; Lauda-Königshofen, Württemberg, Germany
- Died: 22 January 2022 (aged 90); Merzhausen, Baden-Württemberg, Germany
- Education: University of Freiburg
- Occupations: Historian; Professor

Hugo Ott (20 August 1931 – 22 January 2022) was a German historian and academic.

== Biography ==
Ott earned a doctoral degree in 1959 with a thesis on the history of Saint Blaise Abbey in the Black Forest. From 1972 to 1997, he was chair of economic and social history at the University of Freiburg. In 1980, he wrote a biography of Hans Filbinger alongside Wolfgang Jäger and Heinz Hürten. He was a member of the scientific advisory board of the research center Forschungsstelle Widerstand gegen den Nationalsozialismus im deutschen Südwesten, headed by Rudolf Lill at the Karlsruhe Institute of Technology. He held discussions with pastor Emil Kiesel, who talked of the inequity within concentration camps between clergy and their fellow prisoners.

From 1952, Ott had been a member of Unitas and, since 1988, the German Catholic students' society Hercynia Freiburg of Cartellverband.

Ott died in Merzhausen on 22 January 2022, at the age of 90.

== Works ==
- Studien zur Geschichte des Klosters St. Blasien im hohen und späten Mittelalter (1963)
- Die Vogtei über das Kloster St. Blasien seit dem Aussterben der Zähringer bis zum Übergang an das Haus Habsburg (1965)
- Die Klostergrundherrschaft St. Blasien im Mittelalter. Beiträge zur Besitzgeschichte (1969)
- Hans Filbinger. Der „Fall“ und die Fakten (1980)
- Wirtschafts-Ploetz. Die Wirtschaftsgeschichte zum Nachschlagen (1985)
- Martin Heidegger. Unterwegs zu seiner Biographie (1988)
- Martin Heidegger: A Political Life (1994)
- Annäherungen an Martin Heidegger. Festschrift für Hugo Ott zum 65. Geburtstag (1996)
- Geschichte in Verantwortung. Festschrift für Hugo Ott zum 65. Geburtstag (1996)
- Laubhüttenfest 1940 (2007)
