= The MacDonald Brothers (album) =

The Macdonald Brothers

Studio album by The MacDonald Brothers
- Released: 2 April 2007
- Recorded: January–March 2007, Edinburgh, Scotland
- Genre: Pop, folk, rock
- Label: Syco Music, Sony BMG, The Music Kitchen
- Producer: Stuart Wood

The MacDonald Brothers chronology
| The Macdonald Brothers (2007) | The World Outside (2007) |

The MacDonald Brothers (stylised as The MacDonald Bros) is the debut album by Scottish duo The MacDonald Brothers. It was recorded between January and March 2007 in Edinburgh, and released on 2 April 2007 via Syco Music, Sony BMG and independent record label, The Music Kitchen. It entered the UK Albums Chart at number eighteen with first week sales of 11,596, and debuted at number one on the Scottish Albums Chart.

== Background ==
The band's self-titled debut album was released on 2 April 2007, around five months after the band had finished fourth place on the UK TV talent show, The X Factor, with Leona Lewis finishing as the show's winner. The album was recorded from January 2007 until it was released in April 2007 under Simon Cowell's Syco Records and Sony Music Entertainment.

The album was recorded from approximately January until March 2007, and was released on 2 April 2007. The album was released through Syco Records along with Sony BMG. The album was produced by former Bay City Rollers star Stuart "Woody" Woods.

== Critical reception ==
Commenting in March 2007, HMV said "after their success on the X Factor, the MacDonald Brothers release their debut eponymous album, a collection of feel good classic and Scottish/Celtic pop, along with two self-penned numbers".

== Commercial performance ==
In their native Scotland, The MacDonald Brothers debuted atop the Scottish Albums Chart, ahead of Because of the Times by Kings of Leon and Shock Value by Timbaland. It remained at number one in Scotland in its second week of release, before falling to number six during its third week. By its fourth week of release, it just managed to remain in the Scottish Top 10 albums, placing at number ten before falling to number thirty-four in its fifth week. It then fell out of the top forty in Scotland entirely, placing at number fifty in its sixth week.

In the United Kingdom, the album faired relatively well commercially, however, its duration on the UK Albums Chart was shorter than its tenure in the Scottish Top 100 Albums Chart. It debuted at number eighteen on the UK Albums Chart, spending a total of three weeks within the UK Top 100.

== Track listing ==
1. "500 Miles"
2. "Shang-A-Lang"
3. "Love Is All Around"
4. "Young at Heart"
5. "When You Say Nothing at All"
6. "Real Gone Kid"
7. "Magic"
8. "Bye Bye Baby"
9. "Fields of Gold"
10. "Perfect"
11. "Love Is Blind"
12. "Now It's Time"
13. "With a Woman Like You"

== Chart performance ==
Weekly chart performance for The MacDonald Brothers
| Chart (2007) | Peak position |
|---|---|
| Scottish Albums (OCC) | 1 |
| UK Albums (OCC) | 18 |
| UK Independent Albums (OCC) | 3 |
