= Little Man, What Now? (1933 film) =

1933 film directed by Fritz Wendhausen

- Directed by: Fritz Wendhausen
- Written by: Hans Fallada (novel); Herbert Selpin; Fritz Wendhausen
- Produced by: Robert Neppach
- Starring: Hermann Thimig; Hertha Thiele; Viktor de Kowa
- Cinematography: Ewald Daub
- Edited by: Herbert Selpin
- Music by: Harald Böhmelt
- Production company: R.N.-Filmproduktion
- Distributed by: Europa-Filmverleih
- Release date: 3 August 1933
- Running time: 100 minutes
- Country: Germany
- Language: German

Little Man, What Now? (German: Kleiner Mann – was nun?) is a 1933 German drama film directed by Fritz Wendhausen and starring Hermann Thimig, Hertha Thiele and Viktor de Kowa. It is an adaptation of the novel of the same name by Hans Fallada. The original concept for the film was to take a naturalistic approach, the same way the novel did, with Kurt Weill composing the music. Fallada had already remarked in 1932, after falling out with the producers and script writers, that the film had little to do with his novel, and that the script writers "would take a different approach," which they did. The Nazi Film Review Office insisted on extensive cuts, including all scenes featuring the Comedian Harmonists.

It was shot at the Johannisthal Studios in Berlin. The film's sets were designed by the art directors Willy Schiller and Otto Guelstorff. Location shooting took place around Swinemünde. It was well received by contemporary critics, many of whom considered it the best German film of 1933. A separate American film adaptation of Fallada's novel, Little Man, What Now?, was released in 1934.

== Plot ==
The young accountant Hans Pinneberg lives in the provinces with his wife, who he affectionately calls “Laemmchen” ("Lil' Lamb"). He has to keep his marriage to beautiful young Emma a secret because his boss plans to marry him off to his daughter. When the truth comes out, Hans is released. Now Hans' stepmother in Berlin has to help. She and her shady lover try to support the young couple by providing Hans and his wife with an apartment in their house. But Hans ends up in prison. When he is released, it dawns on him that his stepmother runs a brothel. Hans and Lammchen leave their apartment to stay with a street vendor friend of theirs. This time there seems to be cause for cautious optimism.

== Cast ==
- Hermann Thimig as Pinneberg
- Hertha Thiele as Emma 'Lämmchen' Mörchel
- Viktor de Kowa as Heilbutt
- Ida Wüst as Pinnebergs Mutter
- Fritz Kampers as Jachmann
- Paul Henckels as Lehmann
- Theo Lingen as Der Verkäufer
- Jakob Tiedtke as Kleinholz
- Hugo Flink as Jaenicke
- Aenne Goerling as Frau Kleinholz
- Blandine Ebinger as Kleinholz' Tochter
- Günther Vogdt as Lauterbach
- Albert Hörrmann as Schulz
- Carl Auen as Kriminalbeamter
- Willi Tholen as Kriminalbeamter
- Comedian Harmonists as Themselves (scenes deleted)

== Bibliography ==
- Sadoul, Georges (1972). Morris, Peter (ed.). Dictionary of Films. Translated by Morris, Peter. University of California Press. ISBN 978-0-520-02152-5.
- Klaus, Ulrich J. Deutsche Tonfilme: Jahrgang 1933. Klaus-Archiv, 1988.
