= Little Man, What Now? (1934 film) =

1934 film

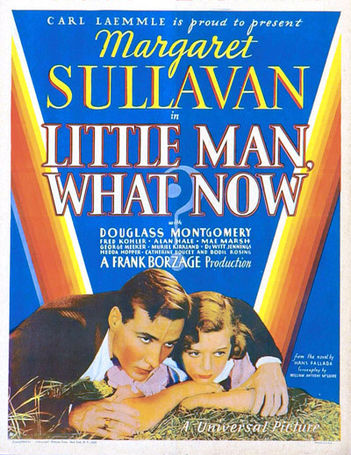
- Film poster
- Directed by: Frank Borzage
- Screenplay by: William Anthony McGuire
- Based on: Little Man, What Now? 1932 novel by Hans Fallada
- Produced by: Carl Laemmle Jr.
- Starring: Margaret Sullavan; Douglass Montgomery
- Cinematography: Norbert F. Brodin
- Edited by: Milton Carruth
- Music by: Arthur Kay (uncredited)
- Production company: Universal Pictures
- Distributed by: Universal Pictures
- Release date: May 1, 1934 (New York)
- Running time: 98 minutes
- Country: United States
- Language: English

Little Man, What Now? is a 1934 pre-Code American drama film directed by Frank Borzage and starring Margaret Sullavan. It is based on the 1932 novel of the same name by Hans Fallada. The novel had been turned into a German film the previous year. The film was a box-office disappointment for Universal.

== Plot ==
In Germany in the early 1930s, a young couple are struggling against poverty. Hans is a small business agent. He is happily married to Emma, whom he affectionately calls "lämmchen" (small lamb). They must keep their marriage a secret in order for Hans to retain his job, as his boss wants him to marry the boss' daughter. However, Hans loses his job when the truth emerges. Hans and Emma stay with his stepmother in bustling Berlin to find success. Hans secures a small job in a department store. Hans and Emma discover that his stepmother is really a notorious madam who runs an exclusive brothel.

== Cast ==
- Margaret Sullavan as Emma "Lammchen" Pinneberg
- Douglass Montgomery as Hans Pinneberg
- Alan Hale as Holger Jachman
- Catherine Doucet as Mia Pinneberg (as Catharine Doucet)
- DeWitt Jennings as Emil Kleinholz
- G.P Huntley as Herr Heilbutt (as G.P. Huntley Jr.)
- Muriel Kirkland as Marie Kleinholz
- Fred Kohler as Karl Goebbler
- Mae Marsh as Wife of Karl Goebbler
- Donald Haines as Emil Kleinholz Jr.
- Christian Rub as Herr Puttbreese
- Alan Mowbray as Franz Schluter
