= Little Man, What Now? (novel) =

1932 novel by Hans Fallada

- Author: Hans Fallada
- Original title: Kleiner Mann – was nun?
- Language: German
- Published: 1932
- Publisher: Rowohlt
- Publication place: Weimar Republic

Little Man, What Now? (German title: Kleiner Mann – was nun?) is a novel by Hans Fallada, which although first published in June 1932, is set between 1930 and November 1932. The book was an immediate success in Germany, given its intense descriptions of the harsh life in the years after the Stock Market Crash of 1929 and the first years of the Great Depression. The book was also a breakthrough for Fallada as a fiction writer.

== Plot synopsis ==
The bookkeeper Johannes Pinneberg and his girlfriend, the salesgirl Emma "Lämmchen" Mörschel, marry after they find out that she is two months pregnant. Johannes is fired and must find a new job in the middle of the economic crisis.

Johannes' mother, Mia, a nightclub hostess from Berlin, comes to the rescue by finding her son a job as a salesman in a Berlin department store. However, Johannes is under heavy pressure once his boss introduces a monthly sales quota for salesman to meet, or else they be made redundant; this leads to fierce competition between colleagues. When Johannes and Emmma's son Horst, is born, money becomes scarce again when their health insurance payouts are delayed.

After a year, Johannes becomes less able to work at Mandels: he is warned for his frequent tardiness and is behind on his quota. Film actor Franz Schlüter wanders into the shop, and Johannes begs Franz to buy something from him. The actor refuses and complains to the manager about Johannes's behavior, and Johannes is promptly fired.

In November 1932, the family illegally moves into Johannes' former colleague's summer house 40 km east of Berlin. Johannes has been unemployed for 14 months, so Emma darns socks and sews dresses for local families for money. One of Johannes' journeys to Berlin ends in a fiasco, as Johannes, with his poor appearance, is chased away from Friedrichstrasse by the police. The couple realizes that good old-fashioned love is all that matters.

== Social Commentary ==
Fallada gives detailed descriptions of the living conditions of the white-collar workers of the time. He also shows the roles of trade unions, governmental institutions, and sacking in the labor market, while also highlighting the benefits of Germany's social care system, including unemployment benefits, socialized medicine, and maternity leave. Businesses are shown to exploit and pit people of the same class against each other, and reveal everyone's worst side.

== Reception and censorship ==
After Adolf Hitler's rise to power in 1933, Fallada had to make a few changes to the novel that removed anything that showed the Nazis in a bad light: a Sturmabteilung (SA) thug had to be turned into a soccer thug, for example, and the book stayed in print through 1941 after which paper shortages curtailed the printing of novels.

In 2016, a complete edition was published in Germany that added about 100 pages to the original 400 pages in the 1932 edition. The cuts had been made with Fallada's consent by his publisher Ernst Rowohlt. German reviewers agreed that the tone and the structure of the novel had not suffered from the cuts, but that the restored sections added 'colour and atmosphere,' such as a dreamlike Robinson Crusoe island fantasy taking the main character away from his drab everyday life, a visit to the cinema to see a Charles Chaplin movie, and an evening at the Tanzpalast (Dance Palace).

Kleiner Mann is today considered a modern classic in Germany, with its depiction of the last days of the Weimar Republic, and was one of the first novels to be republished after the war in 1947. Its success in 1932 rescued Ernst Rowohlt's publishing house, and he made it No.1 in his numbered series of paperback novels. The complete 1932 edition of the novel is available in German at Projekt Gutenberg-DE.

== Screen adaptations ==
The 1933 German film Kleiner Mann - was nun? was made under Nazi censorship. Fallada had already remarked in 1932 that the script had little to do with his novel, and that the script writers "would take a different approach." In 1934 the film Little Man, What Now? was released in the United States. It clearly reflects the situation of the young German mind during that period, especially the effects of war and the economic shut down and is a little closer to the novel than the German film.
