= Wolf Among Wolves =

1937 novel by Hans Fallada

- Author: Hans Fallada
- Original title: Wolf unter Wölfen
- Translator: Philip Owens
- Language: German
- Publisher: Rowohlt Verlag
- Publication date: 1937
- Publication place: Germany
- English publication date: 1938

Wolf Among Wolves (German title: Wolf unter Wölfen) is a 1937 novel by the German writer Hans Fallada.

== Plot ==
This novel has a large cast of characters and portrays post-World War I Germany. It begins in Berlin 1923 and describes the collapse of the German economy which led to rioting, starvation and widespread unemployment.

== Publication ==
Wolf Among Wolves was first published in 1937 by Rowohlt Verlag GmbH, Berlin. Its first unabridged translation into English by Philip Owens was published in 1938.

== Adapations ==
In 1965 it was adapted into the East German television series Wolf Among Wolves starring Armin Mueller-Stahl.

The novel was the basis for the opera Wolf unter Wölfen by Søren Nils Eichberg, which premiered at Theater Koblenz on 23 November 2019.
