= Otto Knille =

German painter

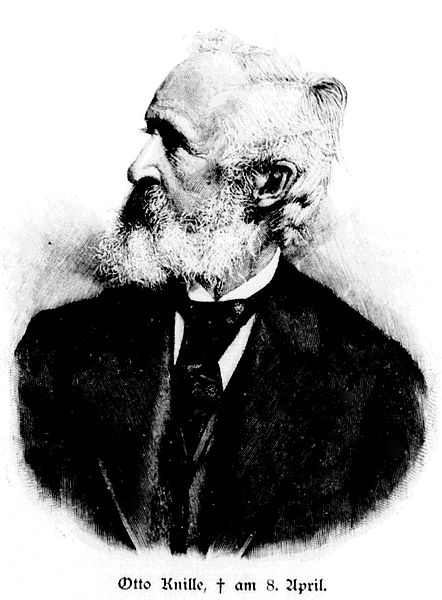
Otto Knille; from the Illustrirte Zeitung (1898)

Otto Knille (10 September 1832, Osnabrück - 7 April 1898, Merano) was a German history painter; associated with the Düsseldorfer Malerschule.

== Biography ==
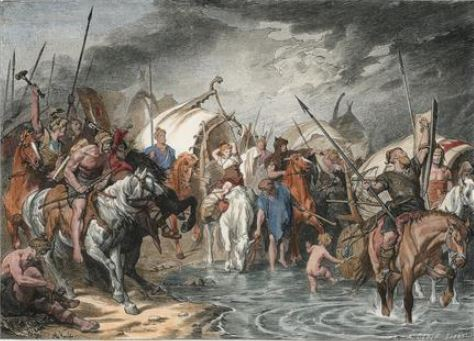
Germanic Peoples on the Move

His father, Justus Georg Knille (1803–1881), was an administrative official in Osnabrück. While attending the gumnasium there, he began to display artistic talent, so he received lessons from a local landscape painter. In 1848, he went to the Kunstakademie Düsseldorf, where he studied with Karl Ferdinand Sohn, Theodor Hildebrandt and Friedrich Wilhelm von Schadow. Later, he had private lessons from the history painter, Emanuel Leutze. While there, he became one of the founding members of the progressive artists' association, Malkasten.

In 1853, he went to Paris and worked in the studios of Thomas Couture. He then went to Munich, where he worked with Karl von Piloty until 1858. This was followed by a stay in Italy, from 1860 to 1862. After that, he went to Hanover, under the sponsorship of King George V, where he became a portrait painter for the nobility. He also created pictures of legends and fairy tales at Marienburg Castle.

After 1865, he was established in Berlin; painting historical works on behalf of the Prussian government. One of his most familiar works came from this period: Herausforderung zum Kampf (Challenge to the Struggle), a series of five panels celebrating Prussia's victory in the Franco-Prussian War. He also dealt with mythical-heroic themes; notably "Tannhäuser and Venus". In 1875, he began teaching at the Prussian Academy of Arts; becoming a Professor there in 1877.

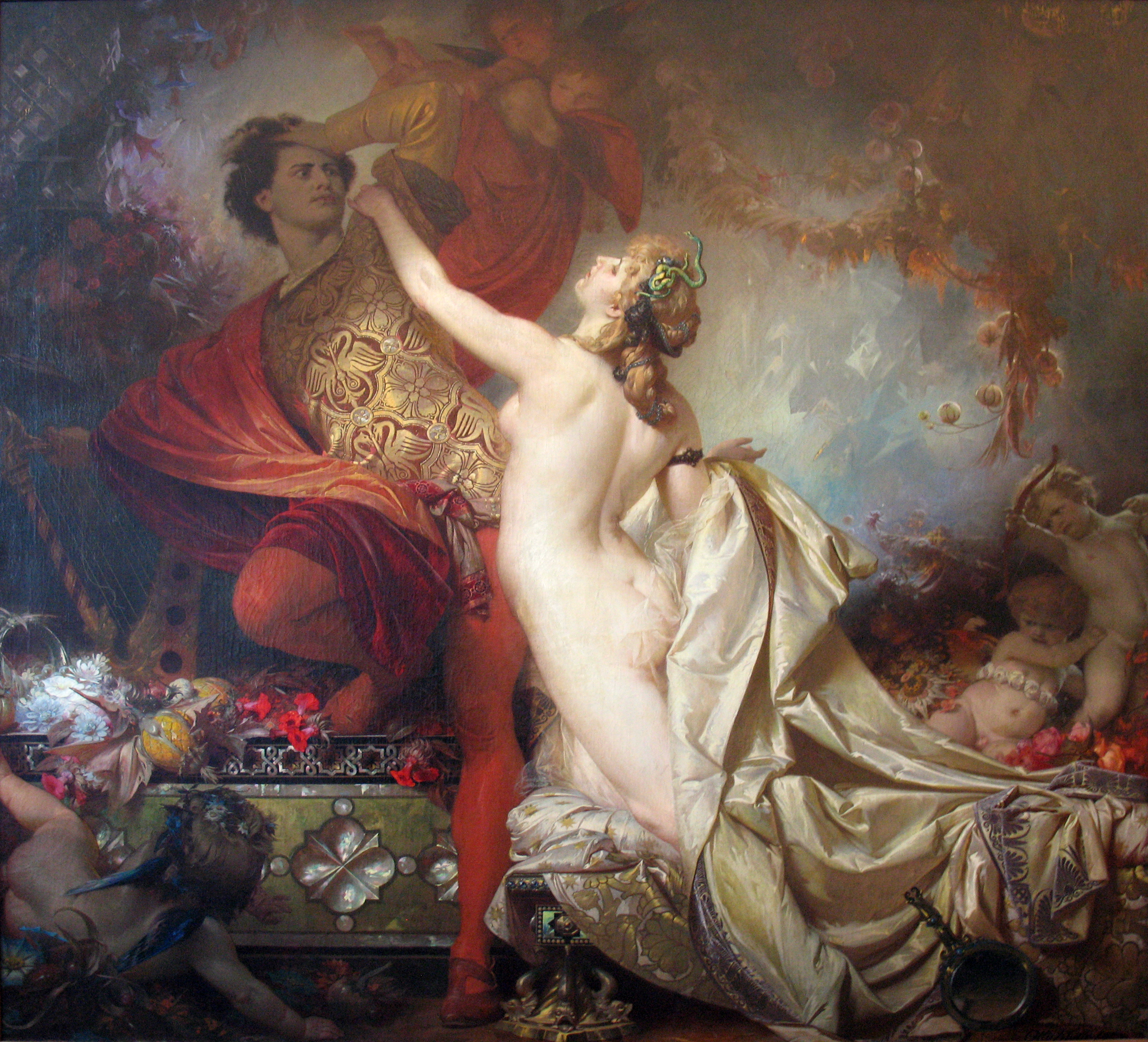
Tannhäuser and Venus

In 1897, he wrote a monograph; Wollen und Können in der Malerei (Willingness and Ability in Painting). The following year he died, at the age of sixty-six, while travelling through the Italian Alps. His body was returned to Berlin and interred at the Friedhöfe vor dem Halleschen Tor.

== Sources ==
- Hermann Alexander Müller: Biographisches Künstler-Lexikon. Die bekanntesten Zeitgenossen auf dem Gebiet der bildenden Künste aller Länder mit Angabe ihrer Werke, Bibliographisches Institut, Leipzig 1882, pp. 302–303 (Online).
- Knille, Otto. In: Friedrich von Boetticher: Malerwerke des neunzehnten Jahrhunderts. Beitrag zur Kunstgeschichte. Vol.I, Dresden 1895, pg.711
- Ausstellung von Werken der Maler Albert Dressler und Otto Knille. November – Dezember 1898. Königliche Museen zu Berlin. National-Galerie. Edited by Hugo von Tschudi. Ernst Siegfried Mittler und Sohn, Berlin 1898 (Königliche National-Galerie. Sonderausstellung. Series 2, 4) (Online).
- Brigitte Lohkamp (1980). "Knille, Otto". Neue Deutsche Biographie (in German). Vol. 12. Berlin: Duncker & Humblot. pp. 186–187. (full text online).
- Ilsetraut Lindemann: "Aus dem Leben des Osnabrücker Malers Otto Knille (1832–1898)". In: Osnabrücker Mitteilungen vol.103, 1998, pp. 181–203
- Lars Berg: Otto Knille (1832–1898). Ein Historienmaler zwischen Düsseldorfer Malerschule und Berliner Akademie. Mit einem Katalog seiner Werke. Dissertation, University of Düsseldorf, 2013 (Online).
