= The World Outside (The MacDonald Brothers album) =

Studio album by The MacDonald Brothers
- Released: 15 October 2007
- Recorded: Edinburgh, Scotland
- Genre: Pop
- Label: Syco Music, Sony Music Entertainment, The Music Kitchen
- Producer: Stuart Wood

The MacDonald Brothers chronology
The MacDonald Brothers (2007)	The World Outside (2007)	With Love (2008)

The World Outside is the second album from Scottish duo band The MacDonald Brothers. The album was recorded at a studio in Edinburgh, and was released on 15 October 2007 via their record label Syco. The lead single from the album "Runaway (Do You Love Me)" was originally written by Elton John who offered the song to the duo following his decision not to release it by himself.

Commercially, The World Outside debuted at number two in their native Scotland, and entered the UK Albums Chart at number 41 with first week sales in the United Kingdom of 5,126 copies.

== Background and recording ==
The album was the band's second studio album to be released following their debut album which was released in April 2007. Like their debut album, The World Outside features mainly covers versions, mostly Scottish songs such as "Saturday Night" by Bay City Rollers. Unlike their previous album, The World Outside featured original material by the duo, including the song "Runaway (Do You Love Me)" which was originally written by Elton John. The song was pitched to the duo by John and his record label following his decision not to record or release the song by himself, and as a result the duo were "gifted" the song to record and include on the album. The song was later released as the lead single from the album in 2007.

The recording for the album is said to have taken place sometime since the release of their 2007 self-titled debut album, which was released in April 2007, and to the release of this album in October 2007. The album was released through Syco Records and Sony Music Entertainment alongside the Scottish independent record label, The Music Kitchen.

== Commercial performance ==
In their native Scotland, The World Outside debuted at number two on the Scottish Albums Chart behind Pull the Pin by Stereophonics. This was in contrast to debuting atop the charts in Scotland with their debut album in April 2007. Nonetheless, in its second week of release, the album slipped to number fourteen before falling to thirty-five in its third week. It fell further to number seventy one in its fourth week of release, before falling to number ninety-seven. It spent a total of five weeks within the Scottish Albums Chart Top 100.

Its commercial performance in the United Kingdom was less successful, spending only one week within the UK Albums Charts Top 100 following a debut appearance of number forty one, just short of reaching the UK Top 40.

== Critical reception ==
Upon the release of The World Outside, music retailer HMV commented on the album as being a "crowd-pleasing poppy selection of original tracks and cover versions, this album will appeal to fans of artists such as Simply Red, The Proclaimers and Wet Wet Wet. Includes the tracks 'Somethin' About You', 'Saturday Night' and 'I Want You To Want Me', and also includes a bonus DVD that includes two extra tracks and a fly-on-the wall documentary of the duo's rise to fame".

== Track listing ==
The following list is a complete listing of the track list as featured on The World Outside:

=== Normal edition CD ===
1. "Close Encounters"
2. "Saturday Night"
3. "Somethin' About You"
4. "Earthbound"
5. "When I'm Dead and Gone"
6. "You and I"
7. "I Want You to Want Me"
8. "Breakaway"
9. "Come Back Susannah"
10. "I Found a Place"
11. "Trick of the Light"
12. "Na Na Na Song"
13. "Please Stay"
14. "Runaway (Do You Love Me)" [bonus track]
15. "I Find the Answer" [bonus track]

=== DVD ===
1. "Can't Take My Eyes Off You"
2. "Don't Worry Baby"
3. "MacDonald Bros Story" [documentary]

== Chart performance ==
Chart (2007)	Peak position
UK Albums Chart	41
Scottish Albums Chart	2
