= Hans Fallada =

German writer

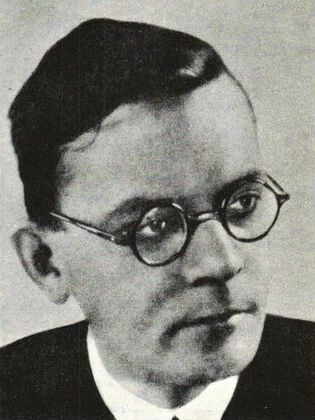
- Born: Rudolf Wilhelm Friedrich Ditzen; 21 July 1893; Greifswald, German Empire
- Died: 5 February 1947 (aged 53); Niederschönhausen, Berlin, Germany
- Occupation: Writer
- Known for: A Small Circus (1931); Little Man, What Now? (1932); Iron Gustav (1938); Every Man Dies Alone (1947)
- Movement: Neue Sachlichkeit
- Children: Ulrich Ditzen (1930-2013)

Hans Fallada (German: [hans ˈfa.la.da]; born Rudolf Wilhelm Friedrich Ditzen; 21 July 1893 – 5 February 1947) was a German writer of the first half of the 20th century. Some of his better known novels include Little Man, What Now? (1932) and Every Man Dies Alone (1947). His works belong predominantly to the New Objectivity literary style, a style associated with an emotionless reportage approach, with precision of detail, and a veneration for 'the fact'. Fallada's pseudonym derives from a combination of characters found in Grimms' Fairy Tales: The titular protagonist of Hans in Luck (KHM 83), and Fallada the magical talking horse in The Goose Girl. Fallada was nominated for the Nobel Prize in Literature in 1936, and 1939.

== Early life ==
Fallada was born in Greifswald, Germany, the child of a magistrate on his way to becoming a supreme court judge, and a mother from a middle-class background, both of whom shared an enthusiasm for music and, to a lesser extent, literature. Jenny Williams notes in her biography More Lives than One (1998), that Fallada's father would often read aloud to his children works by authors such as Shakespeare and Schiller.

In 1899, when Fallada was 6, his father relocated the family to Berlin following the first of several promotions he would receive. Fallada had a very difficult time upon first entering school in 1901. As a result, he immersed himself in books, eschewing literature more in line with his age for authors such as Flaubert, Dostoevsky, and Dickens. In 1909 the family again relocated, to Leipzig, following his father's appointment to the Imperial Supreme Court.

In 1909 (age 16), he was run over by a horse-drawn cart, then kicked in the face by the horse. This mishap plus the contraction of typhoid in 1910 (age 17) seem to mark a turning point in Fallada's life. His lifelong drug problems were born of the pain-killing medications he was taking as the result of his injuries. These issues manifested themselves in multiple suicide attempts.

In 1911 he made a pact with a friend, Hanns Dietrich von Necker, to stage a duel to mask their suicides, feeling that the duel would be seen as more honorable. However, because of both boys' inexperience with weapons, it was a bungled affair. Dietrich missed Fallada, but Fallada did not miss Dietrich, killing him. Fallada was so distraught that he picked up Dietrich's gun and shot himself in the chest, but somehow survived. Nonetheless, the death of his friend ensured his status as an outcast from society.

Although he was found innocent of murder by reason of insanity, from this point on he would undergo multiple stints in mental institutions. At one of these institutions, he was assigned to work in a farmyard, thus beginning his lifelong affinity with farm culture.

== Writing career and encounters with Nazism ==
While in a sanatorium Fallada took to translation and poetry, albeit unsuccessfully, before finally breaking ground as a novelist in 1920 with the publication of his first book Der junge Goedeschal ("Young Goedeschal"). During this period he also struggled with morphine addiction, and the death of his younger brother in the First World War.

In the wake of the war, Fallada worked at several farmhand and other agricultural jobs in order to support himself and finance his growing drug addiction. While before the war Fallada relied on his father for financial support while writing, after the German defeat he was no longer able, or willing, to depend on his father's assistance. Shortly after the publication of Anton und Gerda Fallada reported to prison in Greifswald to serve a 6-month sentence for stealing grain from his employer and selling it to support his drug habit. Less than 3 years later, in 1926, Fallada again found himself imprisoned as a result of a drug and alcohol-fueled string of thefts from employers. In February 1928 he finally emerged free of addiction.

Fallada married Anna "Suse" Issel in 1929 and maintained a string of respectable jobs in journalism, working for newspapers and eventually for the publisher of his novels, Rowohlt. It is around this time that his novels became noticeably political and started to comment on the social and economic woes of Germany. His breakthrough success came in 1931 with A Small Circus (German: Bauern, Bonzen und Bomben; "Peasants, Bosses and Bombs") based on the history of the Rural People's Movement in Schleswig-Holstein and the farmers' protest and boycott of the town of Neumünster. Williams notes that Fallada's 1930/31 novel "..established [him] as a promising literary talent as well as an author not afraid to tackle controversial issues". Martin Seymour-Smith said it is one of his best novels, "it remains one of the most vivid and sympathetic accounts of a local revolt ever written."

The great success of Kleiner Mann - was nun? (Little Man, What Now?) in 1932, while immediately easing his financial straits, was overshadowed by his anxiety over the rise of national socialism and a subsequent nervous breakdown. Although none of his work was deemed subversive enough to warrant action by the Nazis, many of his peers were arrested and interned, and his future as an author under the Nazi regime looked bleak. A German film of the book was made by Jewish producers at the end of 1932, and this earned Fallada closer attention by the rising Nazi Party. The film, unlike the US film of 1934, bore little resemblance to the novel, and was finally released after many cuts by the Nazi censors in mid-1933.

These anxieties were compounded by the loss of a baby only a few hours after childbirth. However he was heartened by the great success of Little Man, What Now? in Great Britain and the United States, where the book was a bestseller. In the U.S., it was selected by the Book of the Month Club, and was even made into a Hollywood movie, Little Man, What Now? (1934).

Meanwhile, as the careers, and in some cases the lives, of many of Fallada's contemporaries were rapidly drawing to a halt, he began to draw some additional scrutiny from the government in the form of denunciations of his work by Nazi authors and publications, who also noted that he had not joined the Party. On Easter Sunday, 1933, he was jailed by the Gestapo for "anti-Nazi activities" after one such denunciation, but despite a ransacking of his home no evidence was found and he was released a week later.

After Adolf Hitler's rise to power in 1933, Fallada had to make a few changes to the novel that removed anything that showed the Nazis in a bad light: a Sturmabteilung (SA) thug had to be turned into a soccer thug, for example, and the book stayed in print until 1941, after which wartime paper shortages curtailed the printing of novels.

In 2016, a complete edition was published in Germany that added about 100 pages to the original 400 pages in the 1932 edition. The cuts had been made with Fallada's consent by his publisher Ernst Rowohlt. German reviewers agreed that the tone and the structure of the novel had not suffered from the cuts, but that the restored sections added 'colour and atmosphere,' such as a dream-like Robinson Crusoe island fantasy taking the main character away from his drab everyday life, a visit to the cinema to see a Charles Chaplin movie, and an evening at the Tanzpalast (Dance Palace).

Although his 1934 novel Wir hatten mal ein Kind (Once We Had a Child) met with initially positive reviews, the official Nazi publication Völkischer Beobachter disapproved. In the same year, the Ministry for Public Enlightenment and Propaganda "recommended the removal of Little Man, What Now? from all public libraries". Meanwhile, the official campaign against Fallada was beginning to take a toll on the sales of his books, landing him in financial straits that precipitated another nervous breakdown in 1934.

In September 1935 Fallada was officially declared an "undesirable author", a designation that banned his work from being translated and published abroad. His novel Old Heart Goes A-Journeying caused him problems with the Reich Literary Chamber because it had Christianity instead of Nazism as the unifier of the people. Although this order was repealed a few months later, it was at this point that his writing shifted from an artistic endeavor to merely a much-needed source of income, writing "children's stories and harmless fairy tales" that would also conveniently avoid the unwanted attention of the Nazis. During this time the prospect of emigration held a constant place in Fallada's mind, although he was reluctant because of his love of Germany.

In 1937 the publication and success of Wolf unter Wölfen (Wolf Among Wolves) marked Fallada's temporary return to his serious, realistic style. The Nazis read the book as a sharp criticism of the Weimar Republic, and thus naturally approved. Notably, Joseph Goebbels called it "a super book". Goebbels's interest in Fallada's work would lead the writer to a world of worry: he would subsequently suggest the writer compose an anti-Semitic tract, and his praise indirectly resulted in Fallada's commission to write a novel that would be the basis for a state-sponsored film charting the life of a German family up to 1933.

The book Der eiserne Gustav (Iron Gustav) was a look at the deprivations and hardships brought on by World War I, but upon reviewing the manuscript Goebbels would suggest that Fallada stretch the time-line of the story to include the rise of the Nazis and their depiction as solving the problems of the War and Weimar. Fallada wrote several different versions before eventually capitulating under the pressure of both Goebbels and his depleted finances. Other evidence of his surrender to Nazi intimidation came in the form of forewords he subsequently wrote for two of his more politically ambiguous works, brief passages in which he essentially declared that the events in his books took place before the rise of the Nazis and were clearly "designed to placate the Nazi authorities".

By the end of 1938, despite the deaths of several colleagues at the hands of the Nazis, Fallada finally reversed his decision to emigrate. His British publisher, George Putnam, had made arrangements and sent a private boat to whisk Fallada and his family out of Germany. According to Jenny Williams, Fallada had actually packed his bags and loaded them into the car when he told his wife he wanted to take one more walk around their smallholding. "When he returned some time later," Williams writes, "he declared that he could not leave Germany and that Suse should unpack."

This seemingly abrupt change of plans coincided with an inner conviction that Fallada had long harbored. Years earlier he had confided to an acquaintance that: "I could never write in another language, nor live in any other place than Germany."

== World War II ==
Fallada once again dedicated himself to writing children's stories and other non-political material suitable for the sensitive times. Nevertheless, with the German invasion of Poland in 1939 and the subsequent outbreak of World War II, life became still more difficult for Fallada and his family. War rations were the basis for several squabbles between his family and other members of his village. On multiple occasions neighbors reported his supposed drug addiction to authorities, threatening to reveal his history of psychological disturbances, a dangerous record indeed under the Nazi regime.

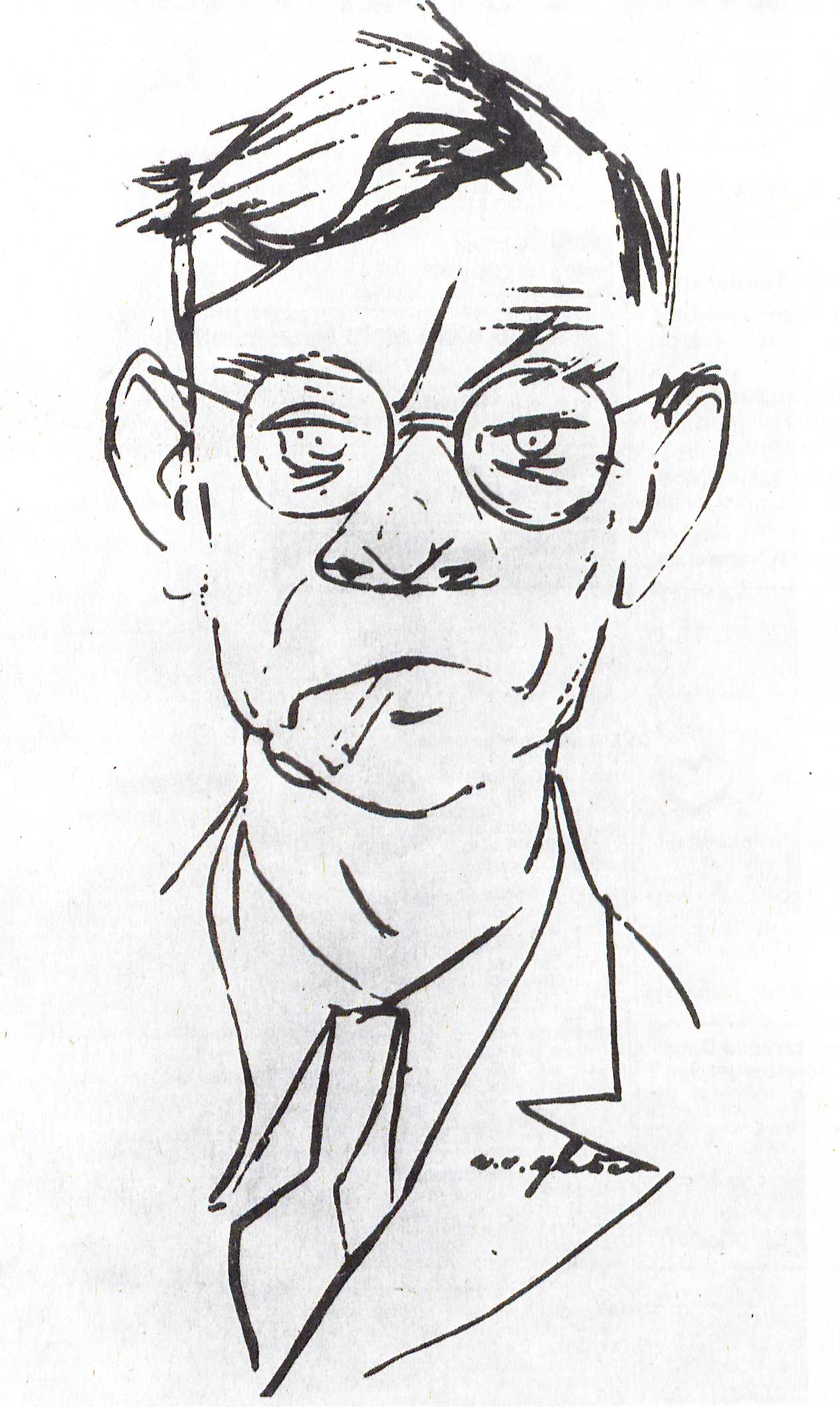
Caricature of Hans Fallada in 1943 by E. O. Plauen

The rationing of paper, which prioritized state-promoted works, was also an impediment to his career. Nevertheless, he continued to publish in a limited role, even enjoying a very brief window of official approval. This window closed abruptly near the end of 1943 with the loss of his 25-year publisher Rowohlt, who fled the country. It was also at this time that he turned to alcohol and extra-marital affairs to cope with, among other matters, the increasingly strained relationship with his wife. Furthermore, in 1943 he travelled to France and the Reichsgau Sudetenland as Sonderführer (B) by order of the so-called Reichsarbeitsdienst.

In 1944, although their divorce was already finalized, a drunk Fallada and his wife were involved in an altercation in which a shot was fired by Fallada, according to Suse Ditzen in an interview she gave late in her life to biographer Jenny Williams. According to Suse, she took the gun from her husband and hit him over the head with it before calling the police, who confined him to a psychiatric institution. (The police record of the call to the altercation makes no mention of shots being fired.) Throughout this period Fallada had one hope to cling to: the project he had concocted to put off Goebbels's demands that he write an anti-Semitic novel.

It involved the novelization of "a famous fraud case involving two Jewish financiers in the nineteen twenties" which, because of its potential as propaganda, was supported by the government and had eased pressure on him as he worked on other, more sincere projects. Finding himself incarcerated in a Nazi insane asylum, he used this project as a pretext for obtaining paper and writing materials, saying he had an assignment to fulfill for Goebbels's office. This successfully forestalled more harsh treatment: the insane were regularly subjected to barbarous treatment by the Nazis, including physical abuse, sterilization, and even death. But rather than writing the anti-Jewish novel, Fallada used his allotment of paper to write — in a dense, overlapping script that served to encode the text — the novel The Drinker (Der Trinker), a deeply critical autobiographical account of life under the Nazis, and a short diary In meinem fremden Land (A Stranger in My Own Country). It was an act easily punishable by death, but he was not caught, and was released in December 1944 as the Nazi government began to crumble.

== Postwar life ==
Despite a seemingly successful reconciliation with his first wife, only a few months after his release he went on to marry the young, wealthy and attractive Ursula Losch, widow of the artist Kurt Losch, and moved in with her in Feldberg, Mecklenburg. Shortly after, the Soviets invaded the area. Fallada, as a celebrity, was asked to give a speech at a ceremony to celebrate the end of the war. Following this speech, he was appointed interim mayor of Feldberg for 18 months.

The time in the mental institution had taken a toll on Fallada, and, deeply depressed by the seemingly impossible task of eradicating the vestiges of fascism that were now so deeply ingrained in society by the Nazi regime, he once again turned to morphine with his wife, and both soon ended up in hospital. He spent the brief remainder of his life in and out of hospitals and wards. Losch's addiction to morphine appears to have been even worse than Fallada's, and her constantly mounting debts were an additional source of concern. Fallada wrote Jeder stirbt für sich allein (Every Man Dies Alone) between September and November 1946 (shortly before his death), whilst in a mental institution. He told his family that he had written "a great novel".

== Death and legacy ==
At the time of Fallada's death in February 1947, aged 53, from a weakened heart from years of addiction to morphine, alcohol and other drugs, he had recently completed Every Man Dies Alone, an anti-fascist novel based on the true story of a German couple, Otto and Elise Hampel, who were executed for producing and distributing anti-Nazi material in Berlin during the war. According to Jenny Williams, he wrote the book in a "white heat"—a mere 24 days. Fallada died just weeks before the publication of this final novel. He was buried in Pankow, a borough of Berlin, but was later moved to Carwitz where he had lived from 1933 till 1944. After Fallada's death, because of possible neglect and continuing addiction on the part of his second wife and sole heir, many of his unpublished works were lost or sold.

Fallada remained a popular writer in Germany after his death. But, although Little Man, What Now? had been a great success in the United States and the UK, outside of Germany Fallada faded into obscurity for decades. In Germany, Every Man Dies Alone made a great impact. It was filmed for television in both East and West Germany. The novel was brought to the cinema screen in 1976, starring Hildegard Knef and Carl Raddatz. Every Man Dies Alone remained untranslated in English until 2009, when it was rediscovered by American publishing house Melville House Publishing and released in the US under the title Every Man Dies Alone, in a translation by Michael Hofmann. Melville House licensed it to Penguin Books in the UK, who used the title Alone in Berlin. It became a "surprise bestseller" in both the US and UK. It was listed on the official UK Top 50 for all UK publishers, a rare occurrence for such an old book.

Other German writers who had quit the country when Hitler rose to power felt disgust for those such as Fallada who had remained, compromising their work under the Nazi regime. Most notable of these critics was Fallada's contemporary Thomas Mann, who had fled Nazi repression early on and lived abroad. He expressed harsh condemnation for writers like Fallada who, though opponents of Nazism, made concessions which compromised their work. "It may be superstitious belief, but in my eyes, any books which could be printed at all in Germany between 1933 and 1945 are worse than worthless and not objects one wishes to touch. A stench of blood and shame attaches to them. They should all be pulped."

The Hans Fallada Prize, a literary prize awarded by the city of Neumünster, was named after the author.

In popular culture "Hans Fallada" was one of the protagonists of Colin Wilson's 1976 novel The Space Vampires, turned into a film, Lifeforce in 1985.

== Works ==
English:

- Little Man, What Now? (tr. Eric Sutton, 1933; tr. Susan Bennett, 1996)
- Who Once Eats Out of the Tin Bowl (UK) / The World Outside (US) (tr. Eric Sutton, 1934) / Once a Jailbird (UK) (tr. Nicholas Jacobs and Gardis Cramer von Laue, 2012)
- Once We Had a Child (tr. Eric Sutton, 1935)
- An Old Heart Goes A-Journeying (tr. Eric Sutton, 1936)
- Sparrow Farm (tr. Eric Sutton, 1937)
- Wolf Among Wolves (tr. Phillip Owens, 1938; unabridged with additional tr. by Thorsten Carstensen and Nicholas Jacobs, 2010)
- Iron Gustav (tr. Phillip Owens, 1940; unabridged with additional tr. Nicholas Jacobs and Gardis Cramer von Laue, 2014)
- The Drinker (tr. Charlotte and A.L. Lloyd, 1952)
- That Rascal, Fridolin (juvenile; tr. R. Michaelis-Jena and R. Ratcliff, 1959)
- Every Man Dies Alone (US) / Alone in Berlin (UK) (tr. Michael Hofmann, 2009)
- A Small Circus (tr. Michael Hofmann, 2012)
- A Stranger in My Own Country: The 1944 Prison Diary (tr. Allan Blunden, 2014)
- Tales From the Underworld: Selected Shorter Fiction (ed. and tr. Michael Hoffman, 2014)
- Nightmare in Berlin (tr. Allan Blunden, 2016)

Note: Translations made by E. Sutton and P. Owens in the 1930s and 40s were abbreviated and/or made from unreliable editions, according to Fallada biographer Jenny Williams.

German:

Much of Fallada's work is available in German at Projekt Gutenberg-DE Hans Fallada.

- Der junge Goedeschal, 1920
- Anton und Gerda, 1923
- Bauern, Bonzen und Bomben, 1931 (English: A Small Circus)
- Kleiner Mann, was nun?, 1932 (English: Little Man, What Now?)
- Wer einmal aus dem Blechnapf frißt, 1932 (English: Who Once Eats Out of the Tin Bowl / Once a Jailbird (UK))
- Wir hatten mal ein Kind, 1934 (English: Once We Had a Child)
- Märchen vom Stadtschreiber, der aufs Land flog, 1935 (English: Sparrow Farm)
- Altes Herz geht auf die Reise, 1936 (English: An Old Heart Goes A-Journeying)
- Hoppelpoppel - wo bist du?, Kindergeschichten, 1936
- Wolf unter Wölfen, 1937 (English: Wolf Among Wolves)
- Geschichten aus der Murkelei, Märchen, 1938
- Der eiserne Gustav, 1938 (English: Iron Gustav)
- Süßmilch spricht, 1938
- Kleiner Mann - großer Mann, alles vertauscht, 1939
- Süßmilch spricht. Ein Abenteuer von Murr und Maxe, Erzählung, 1939
- Der ungeliebte Mann, 1940
- Das Abenteuer des Werner Quabs, Erzählung, 1941
- Damals bei uns daheim, Erinnerungen, 1942
- Heute bei uns zu Haus, Erinnerungen, 1943
- Fridolin der freche Dachs, 1944 (English: That Rascal, Fridolin)
- Jeder stirbt für sich allein, 1947 (English: Every Man Dies Alone (US) / Alone in Berlin (UK))
- Der Alpdruck, 1947 (English: Nightmare in Berlin)
- Der Trinker, 1950 (English: The Drinker)
- Ein Mann will nach oben, 1953
- Die Stunde, eh´du schlafen gehst, 1954
- Junger Herr - ganz groß, 1965
- Sachlicher Bericht über das Glück, ein Morphinist zu sein 2005 (posthumously published)
- In meinem fremden Land: Gefängnistagebuch 1944 (ed. Jenny Williams & Sabine Lange 2009) (English: A Stranger in My Own Country: The 1944 Prison Diary)

== Filmography ==
- Little Man, What Now?, directed by Fritz Wendhausen (Germany, 1933, based on the novel Little Man, What Now?)
- Little Man, What Now?, directed by Frank Borzage (1934, based on the novel Little Man, What Now?)
- Altes Herz geht auf die Reise, directed by Carl Junghans (Germany, 1938, based on the novel An Old Heart Goes A-Journeying), banned in Nazi Germany, released after World War II
- Heaven, We Inherit a Castle, directed by Peter Paul Brauer (Germany, 1943, based on the novel Kleiner Mann, großer Mann – alles vertauscht)
- Tutto da rifare pover'uomo, directed by Eros Macchi (Italy, 1960, TV miniseries, based on the novel Little Man, What Now?)
- Wer einmal aus dem Blechnapf frisst, directed by Fritz Umgelter (West Germany, 1962, TV miniseries, based on the novel Who Once Eats Out of the Tin Bowl)
- Jeder stirbt für sich allein, directed by Falk Harnack (West Germany, 1962, TV film, based on the novel Every Man Dies Alone)
- Wolf Among Wolves, directed by Hans-Joachim Kasprzik (East Germany, 1965, TV miniseries, based on the novel Wolf Among Wolves)
- Der Trinker, directed by Dietrich Haugk (West Germany, 1967, TV film, based on the novel The Drinker)
- Kleiner Mann – was nun?, directed by Hans-Joachim Kasprzik (East Germany, 1967, TV miniseries, based on the novel Little Man, What Now?)
- Jeder stirbt für sich allein, directed by Hans-Joachim Kasprzik (East Germany, 1970, TV miniseries, based on the novel Every Man Dies Alone)
- Bauern, Bonzen und Bomben, directed by Egon Monk (West Germany, 1973, TV miniseries, based on the novel A Small Circus)
- Everyone Dies Alone, directed by Alfred Vohrer (West Germany, 1976, based on the novel Every Man Dies Alone)
- Ein Mann will nach oben, directed by Herbert Ballmann (West Germany, 1978, TV miniseries, based on the novel Ein Mann will nach oben)
- Der eiserne Gustav, directed by Wolfgang Staudte (West Germany, 1979, TV miniseries, based on the novel Iron Gustav)
- Die Geschichte vom goldenen Taler, directed by Bodo Fürneisen (East Germany, 1985, TV film, based on a short story from Geschichten aus der Murkelei)
- Altes Herz geht auf die Reise, directed by Hans Knötzsch (East Germany, 1987, TV film, based on the novel An Old Heart Goes A-Journeying)
- The Drinker, directed by Tom Toelle (Germany, 1995, TV film, based on the novel The Drinker)
- Alone in Berlin, directed by Vincent Perez (2016, based on the novel Every Man Dies Alone)

== Sources ==
- Daniel Börner: „Wenn Ihr überhaupt nur ahntet, was ich für einen Lebenshunger habe!“ Hans Fallada in Thüringen. Ausstellungskatalog (Literaturmuseum „Romantikerhaus“, 3. Juli bis 10. Oktober 2010), Stadtmuseum Jena (Dokumentation, Band 18), Jena 2010.
- Ulrich „Uli“ Ditzen: Mein Vater und sein Sohn. Aufbau, Berlin 2004, ISBN 3-351-02993-4.
- Klaus Farin: Hans Fallada. „… welche sind, die haben kein Glück“. Tilsner, München 1993 (= Taschenführer populäre Kultur 3), ISBN 3-910079-52-0.
- Patricia Fritsch-Lange, Lutz Hagestedt (Hrsg.): Hans Fallada. Autor und Werk im Literatursystem der Moderne. Walter de Gruyter, Berlin/Boston 2011, ISBN 978-3-11-022712-3.
- Carsten Gansel, Werner Liersch (Hrsg.): Hans Fallada und die literarische Moderne. V&R unipress, Göttingen 2009 (= Deutschsprachige Gegenwartsliteratur und Medien 6), ISBN 978-3-89971-689-4.
- Sabine Koburger: Ein Autor und sein Verleger. Hans Fallada und Ernst Rowohlt in Verlags- und Zeithorizonten. Belleville, München 2015 (= Theorie und Praxis der Interpretation 12), ISBN 978-3-936298-35-2.
- Hannes Lamp: Fallada – Der Alp meines Lebens. Gundlach und Klamp 2007, ISBN 978-3-00-020616-0.
- Sabine Lange: Fallada – Fall ad acta? Sozialistische Erbepflege und das Ministerium für Staatssicherheit. Edition Temmen, Bremen 2006.
- Werner Liersch: Fallada. Der Büchersammler, der Literaturkritiker, der Photographierte, der Missbrauchte. Individuell, Schöneiche bei Berlin 2005, ISBN 3-935552-12-2.
- Cecilia von Studnitz: Ich bin nicht der, den Du liebst. Die frühen Jahre des Hans Fallada in Berlin. Steffen, Friedland 2007, ISBN 978-3-910170-63-6.
- Anja C. Schmidt-Ott: Young love – negotiations of the self and society in selected German novels of the 1930s (Hans Fallada, Aloys Schenzinger, Maria Leitner, Irmgard Keun, Marie Luise Kaschnitz, Anna Gmeyner and Ödön von Horváth). Lang, Frankfurt am Main u. a. 2002 (= Europäische Hochschulschriften; Reihe 1, Deutsche Sprache und Literatur; 1835), ISBN 3-631-39341-5.
- Geoff Wilkes: Hans Fallada’s crisis novels 1931–1947. (= Australian and New Zealand studies in German language and literature. 19). Lang, Bern u. a. 2002, ISBN 3-906770-32-X.
- Jenny Williams: Mehr Leben als eins – Hans Fallada – Biographie. Übersetzt aus dem Englischen von Hans Christian Oeser, Berlin 2011, ISBN 978-3-7466-7089-8. (erweiterte und aktualisierte Neuausgabe, im Anhang: u. a. ein Werkverzeichnis, Werke anderer Autoren und ein Literaturverzeichnis.)
- Klaus-Jürgen Neumärker: Der andere Fallada : eine Chronik des Leidens. Steffen-Verlag, Berlin 2014, ISBN 978-3-941683-49-5.
- Karin Großmann (Sächsische Zeitung): Immer nah am Abgrund (PDF). Rowohlt Theaterverlag. (Gespräch mit dem Psychologen Klaus-Jürgen Neumärker: Es wird die Frage gestellt: „Wurde Hans Fallada vergiftet? Der Psychologe Klaus-Jürgen Neumärker hat bisher unbekannte Krankenakten erforscht und bringt überraschende Fakten ans Licht“).
- Werner Liersch: Kleiner Mann – wohin? – Zerrissen, heimatlos, süchtig – wie der Schriftsteller Hans Fallada in den Nachkriegsjahren lebte und starb. In: Berliner Zeitung– Onlineausgabe, 3 February 2007; retrieved, 2 December 2015.
- Gunnar Müller-Waldeck: Hans Fallada – nach wie vor. Betrachtungen – Erinnerungen – Gespräche – biographische Splitter. Elmenhorst / Vorpommern: Edition Pommern 2016, ISBN 978-3-939680-32-1.
