= Once a Jailbird =

1934 novel by Hans Fallada

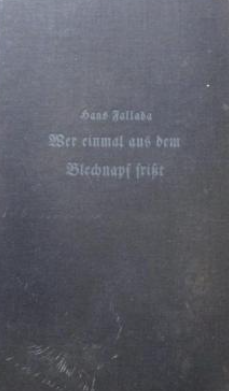
- Author: Hans Fallada
- Original title: Wer einmal aus dem Blechnapf frißt
- Language: German
- Publisher: Rowohlt Verlag
- Publication date: 1934
- Publication place: Germany
- English publication date: 1934
- Pages: 509

Once a Jailbird (German: Wer einmal aus dem Blechnapf frißt), also published in English as Who Once Eats Out of the Tin Bowl and The World Outside, is a 1934 novel by the German writer Hans Fallada. It is about a man who is released from prison and tries to create an orderly life for himself in Hamburg, but becomes ensnared by destructive habits.

The novel was the basis for the 1962 German three-part television serial Wer einmal aus dem Blechnapf frißt. Directed by Fritz Umgelter, the serial transposed the story to post-war Germany and caused political debate due to its subject of a middle-aged anti-hero unable to deal with the recent past.
