= Jeder stirbt für sich allein (disambiguation) =

Jeder stirbt für sich allein ("Every Man Dies Alone") is a 1947 novel by the German author Hans Fallada.

Jeder stirbt für sich allein may also refer to:

- Jeder stirbt für sich allein (1962 film)
- Jeder stirbt für sich allein (1970 miniseries)
- Jeder stirbt für sich allein (1976 film)
