= Alone in Berlin (film) =

2016 film

- French release poster
- Directed by: Vincent Pérez
- Written by: Vincent Pérez; Achim von Borries; Bettine von Borries
- Based on: Every Man Dies Alone by Hans Fallada
- Produced by: Stefan Arndt; Uwe Schott; Marco Pacchioni; Christian Grass; Paul Trijbits; James Schamus
- Starring: Emma Thompson; Brendan Gleeson; Daniel Brühl; Mikael Persbrandt
- Cinematography: Christophe Beaucarne
- Edited by: François Gédigier
- Music by: Alexandre Desplat
- Production companies: X-Filme Creative Pool; Master Movies; Filmwave; Pathé; Buffalo Films; Alone in Berlin Ltd.; WS Film; Lipsync Productions; Canal+
- Distributed by: X-Verleih (Germany; through Warner Bros. Pictures); Pathé Distribution (France); Altitude Film Distribution (United Kingdom)
- Release dates: 15 February 2016 (Berlin); 8 September 2016 (Germany); 23 November 2016 (France); 10 March 2017 (United Kingdom)
- Running time: 103 minutes
- Countries: Germany; France; United Kingdom
- Language: English

Alone in Berlin is a 2016 war drama film which was directed by Vincent Pérez and written by Pérez and Achim von Borries. It is based on the 1947 novel Every Man Dies Alone, by Hans Fallada. The novel's characters Otto and Anna Quangel are based on Otto and Elise Hampel. When their son dies in France, the couple start writing postcards to urge people to protest against Adolf Hitler and the Nazi regime. The film stars Emma Thompson, Brendan Gleeson, Daniel Brühl, and Mikael Persbrandt. Principal photography began on 27 March 2015 in Berlin. It was selected to compete for the Golden Bear at the 66th Berlin International Film Festival.

== Plot ==
In 1940, a working-class couple in World War II-era Berlin, Otto and Anna Quangel, decide to resist Adolf Hitler and the Nazis after receiving news of the death of their only son. Their growing resistance to the regime is also strengthened by the fate of an old Jewish woman living in their building. Although the official genocides had not yet started, Jews had no legal protection. Ruthless Nazis — and "non-ideological" common criminals — use the opportunity to loot the old woman's apartment with impunity. Despite the efforts of the Quangels and other kind neighbors to help her, the persecution ends with the old woman jumping to her death from a high window.

The couple starts writing postcards to urge people to stand against Hitler and the Nazis and protest against them by furtively placing the cards in public places - a capital crime. Their first card reads: "Mother, Hitler Killed My Son. He Will Kill Your Son Too". At first, Otto wants to do it all by himself, warning Anna, "They hang women, too!" Other cards read "Stop the War machine; Hitler's shadow falls over Europe like the devil's shadow; Pass this card on -- Down with the Hitler Regime" (Minute ~40:00 of the movie). Anna insists on taking part in this dangerous activity. While in the beginning of the film the couple's marriage seems to have dried up and they are unable to console each other for the loss of their son, their shared risk and commitment brings them closer. They fall in love with each other again.

Gestapo inspector Escherich is charged with finding the source of the postcards. He is a professional police detective acting out of career pride rather than Nazi ideology. During three years of painstakingly gathering clues about the "Hobgoblin" (as he calls the mysterious writer of the postcards), Escherich develops an increasing respect for this elusive unknown opponent. Because of his lack of progress, Escherich is beaten up by the obviously impatient Obergruppenführer (senior SS officer) and forced to summarily execute a man whom he is certain has no connection with these subversive postcards.

After some postcards accidentally fall from Otto's pocket at work, he is exposed and arrested. He remains stoic about the certain death sentence awaiting him and tries in vain to take all the blame on himself and save Anna. After the couple has been executed, Escherich is alone in his office. He gathers up the couple's hundreds of postcards, scatters them from the open window of the police headquarters and then shoots himself. The film ends with the image of the postcards swirling in the wind, falling down on the Berlin streets and being picked up by passers by.

== Cast ==
- Emma Thompson as Anna Quangel
- Brendan Gleeson as Otto Quangel
- Daniel Brühl as Inspector Escherich
- Mikael Persbrandt as Standartenführer Prall
- Monique Chaumette as Frau Rosenthal
- Joachim Bissmeier as Herr Fromm
- Lars Rudolph as Enno Kluge
- Louis Hofmann as Hans Quangel
- Godehard Giese as Colonel Krüger
- Jacob Matschenz as Dietrich Necker
- Katharina Schüttler as Claire Gehrich

== Production ==
Hans Fallada's Every Man Dies Alone was published posthumously in German in 1947 and was praised by Primo Levi, writer and survivor of Auschwitz, as "the greatest book ever written about German resistance to the Nazis". It was previously adapted as Alfred Vohrer's Everyone Dies Alone in 1975, along with West and East German made-for-television dramas in 1962 and 1970.

Marco Pacchioni and Vincent Pérez bought the rights to the novel in 2007. Upon publication of its English translation in 2009, it became a "surprise bestseller" in both the United States and United Kingdom.

On 14 May 2014, it was announced that Pérez would direct the film based on an adaptation he co-wrote with Achim von Borries. Emma Thompson, Mark Rylance and Daniel Brühl were named for the principal roles. It was produced by X-Filme's Stefan Arndt and Uwe Schott (German rights) Master Movies' Marco Pacchioni (French rights) and Filmwave's Christian Grass, Paul Trijbits, and James Schamus. On 26 March 2015, Rylance was replaced by Brendan Gleeson.

Other crew members included cinematographer Christophe Beaucarne, production designer Jean-Vincent Puzos, and editor François Gédigier. Alison Thompson handled most foreign sales for the film through her Sunray Films, although Pathé released it in French-speaking areas.

The director dedicated the film "in memory of Otto and Elise Hampel guillotined for having written and circulated cards against the Nazi regime between 1940 and 1943".

=== Filming ===
Principal photography on the film began on 27 March 2015 in Berlin. It was also shot in Cologne and Görlitz.

== Reception ==
Alone in Berlin was first screened at the Berlin Film Festival in February 2016. Tara Brady of The Irish Times wrote,

Despite a terrific triumvirate of performances from Gleeson, Thompson, and Brühl, and soft lensing from cinematographer Christophe Beaucarne, Alone in Berlin is hampered by stodgy pacing, budgetary constraints, and drab interiors. Against this, the film offers a fascinating and timely blueprint for political dissent, a methodology that connects with pamphleteering, graffiti, and memes.

In The Guardian, Peter Bradshaw wrote, "More than once, 'Alone in Berlin' reminded me of Fritz Lang's M. Review aggregation website Rotten Tomatoes gives the film an approval rating of 57% based on reviews from 54 critics, with an average rating of 5.7/10. The film received a score of 52 on the critical aggregator website Metacritic, indicating "mixed or average reviews".

== See also ==
- Everyone Dies Alone (1962 West German film; Jeder stirbt für sich allein)
- Jeder stirbt für sich allein (1970 East German miniseries)
