= Otto and Elise Hampel =

German resistance members

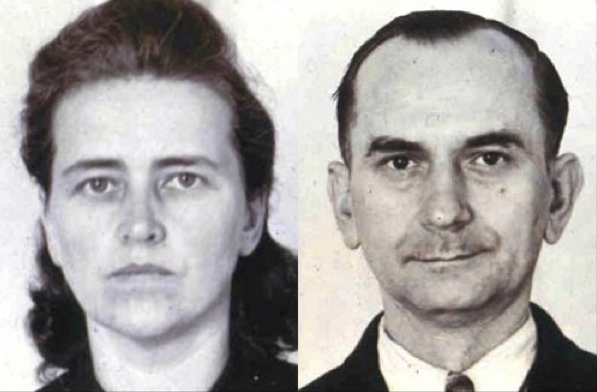
Elise and Otto Hampel's 1942 Gestapo pictures

Otto and Elise Hampel were a working class German couple who created a simple method of protest against Nazism in Berlin during the middle years of World War II. They wrote postcards denouncing Hitler's government and left them in public places around the city. They were eventually caught, tried, and beheaded in Berlin's Plötzensee Prison in April 1943. Shortly after the end of the war, their Gestapo file was given to German novelist Hans Fallada, and their story inspired his 1947 novel, translated into English and published in 2009 as Every Man Dies Alone (Alone in Berlin in the UK). The story was filmed in 2016 as Alone in Berlin.

== Life and resistance ==
One of the Hampels' postcards; in the middle is a postage stamp bearing Hitler's face, scrawled with the words "worker murderer"

Otto Hampel (21 June 1897 – 8 April 1943) was born in Mühlbock, a suburb of Wehrau, now in Poland, but then part of Germany. He served in World War I and was later a factory worker.

Elise Lemme (27 October 1903 – 8 April 1943) was born in the Bismark area of Stendal. Her education lasted only through elementary school. She worked as a domestic servant and was a member of the National Socialist Women's League.

The couple married in 1935. After learning that Elise's brother had been killed in action during Germany's May 1940 invasion of France, the Hampels undertook efforts to encourage resistance against the Third Reich. From September 1940 until their arrest in autumn 1942, they hand-wrote over 287 postcards, dropping them into mailboxes and leaving them in stairwells in Berlin, often near Wedding, where they lived.

The postcards urged people to refuse to cooperate with the Nazis, to refrain from donating money, to refuse military service, and to overthrow Hitler. Although nearly all the postcards were immediately brought to the Gestapo, it took two years for the authorities to find the couple. The Hampels were denounced in autumn 1942 and were arrested. Otto declared to the police that he was happy to be able to protest against Hitler and the Third Reich. At trial at the Volksgerichtshof, the Nazi "People's Court", the Hampels were convicted of Wehrkraftzersetzung and of "preparing for high treason". They were both guillotined on 8 April 1943 in the Plötzensee Prison, Berlin.

== Legacy ==
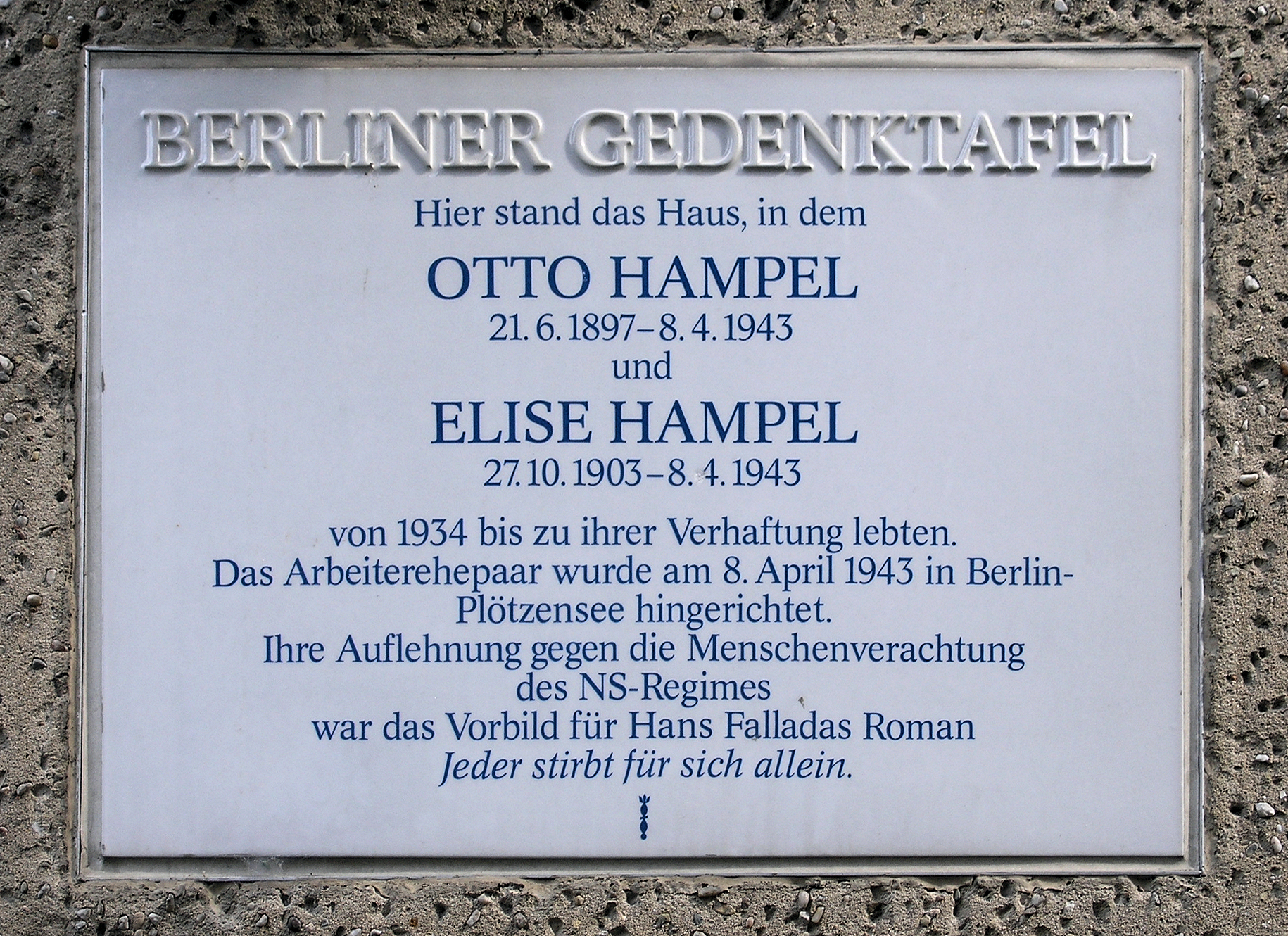
Memorial plaque at the site of the Hampels' former residence, Amsterdamer Straße 10 in Berlin (Note: The plaque reads: "Here stood the house in which OTTO HAMPEL 21.6.1897 to 8. 4.1943 and ELISE HAMPEL 27.10.1903 to 8. 4.1943 lived from 1934 until their arrest. The working-class couple was executed on 8 April 1943 in Berlin- Plötzensee. Their rebellion against contempt for human beings of the Nazi regime was the model for Hans Fallada's novel Everyone dies for himself.")

Their life was fictionalized in the Hans Fallada novel, where they are called Otto and Anna Quangel, and it is their son who is killed, rather than the wife's brother. The English language version of the book published by Melville House Publishing includes an appendix containing some pages from the actual Gestapo file, including mug shots, signed confessions, police reports, and several of the actual postcards used in the protest.

There have been five screen adaptations of the novel: Jeder stirbt für sich allein, directed by Falk Harnack in West Germany in 1962; a television miniseries directed by Hans-Joachim Kasprzik and produced by DEFA in East Germany in 1970; a film version directed by Alfred Vohrer in 1975, released in English as Everyone Dies Alone in 1976, in which Hildegard Knef, who won the award for best actress at the Karlovy Vary International Film Festival, portrayed "Anna Quangel". It was made into a three-part television miniseries in the Czech Republic in 2004, directed by Dušan Klein. A 2016 film Alone in Berlin, starring Emma Thompson and Brendan Gleeson as Anna and Otto, was selected to compete for the Golden Bear at the 66th Berlin International Film Festival in 2016.

== See also ==
- List of Germans who resisted Nazism
- White Rose
- Sophie Scholl
- Hans Scholl
