= Poświętne =

Poświętne may refer to the following places in Poland:

- Poświętne, Nowy Tomyśl County in Greater Poland Voivodeship (west-central Poland)
- Poświętne, Szamotuły County in Greater Poland Voivodeship (west-central Poland)
- Poświętne, Lower Silesian Voivodeship (south-west Poland)
- Poświętne, Opoczno County in Łódź Voivodeship (central Poland)
- Poświętne, Gmina Inowłódz, Tomaszów County in Łódź Voivodeship (central Poland)
- Poświętne, Maków County in Masovian Voivodeship (east-central Poland)
- Poświętne, Radom County in Masovian Voivodeship (east-central Poland)
- Poświętne, Wołomin County in Masovian Voivodeship (east-central Poland)
- Poświętne, Białystok County in Podlaskie Voivodeship (north-east Poland)
- Poświętne, Sokółka County in Podlaskie Voivodeship (north-east Poland)
