= Everyone Dies Alone =

- Courtroom scene: Carl Raddatz and Hildegard Knef as Otto and Anna Quangel
- Directed by: Alfred Vohrer
- Screenplay by: Miodrag Cubelic; Anton Cerwik
- Based on: Every Man Dies Alone by Hans Fallada
- Produced by: Karl Spiehs
- Starring: Hildegard Knef; Carl Raddatz
- Cinematography: Heinz Hölscher
- Edited by: Jutta Hering
- Music by: Gerhard Heinz
- Production companies: Lisa Film; Constantin Film; Terra-Filmkunst
- Distributed by: Constantin Film
- Release date: 21 January 1976
- Running time: 102 minutes
- Country: West Germany
- Language: German

Everyone Dies Alone / Alone in Berlin (Original title: Jeder stirbt für sich allein) is a 1976 West German drama film adapted from the Hans Fallada novel Every Man Dies Alone. The book was based on the story of two ordinary Germans, Otto and Elise Hampel, who committed acts of civil disobedience against the Third Reich, were caught and sentenced to death.

== Synopsis ==
The film takes place in Berlin in 1940, during World War II as Adolf Hitler is at the height of his power. Anna and Otto Quangel, a working class couple, live in Berlin in simple circumstances and are not particularly interested in politics. Then, their only son is killed in action during the Battle of France and as they grieve for their son, the desire to resist the Nazi regime grows within them. When a Jewish neighbor is also killed, Anna decides to join the German Resistance. She begins writing very personal flyers on postcards, which she at first alone and then with her husband, leaves in public places and slips into mailboxes. The two are discovered, arrested and eventually sentenced to death. Otto Quangel commits suicide in the courtroom with a cyanide pill; his wife is executed two months later.

== Reception ==
The Lexikon des deutschen Films published in 1995 by German publisher Reclam called the film Vohrer's most challenging work, stating further, "albeit somewhat sentimental, but without sensationalist moments, this film adaptation comes near Fallada's original. Especially haunting is the focused and unadorned performance by Hildegard Knef."

== Other screen versions ==
There are two earlier screen adaptations of Fallada's book and one later. The first filmed version was Falk Harnack's 1962 television play, Jeder stirbt für sich allein produced and broadcast in West Germany. Anna and Otto Quangel were played by Edith Schultze-Westrum and Alfred Schieske. In 1970, DEFA produced a three-part miniseries, Jeder stirbt für sich allein in East Germany, directed by Hans-Joachim Kasprzik. Elsa Grube-Deister and Erwin Geschonneck played the main roles and supported by Wolfgang Kieling and Fred Delmare among others. In 2004, a Czech version, I ve smrti sami, was produced as a television miniseries, directed by Dušan Kleina and broadcast in the Czech Republic.

== Cast ==
- Hildegard Knef as Anna Quangel
- Carl Raddatz as Otto Quangel
- Martin Hirthe as Escherich
- Gerd Böckmann as Schröder
- Sylvia Manas as Trudel Baumann
- Peter Matić as Enno Kluge
- Heinz Reincke as Emil Borkhausen
- Beate Hasenau as Karla Borkhausen
- Hans Korte as Obergruppenführer Prall
- Alexander Radszun as Otti Quangel
- Rudolf Fernau
- Brigitte Mira
- Heinz Ehrenfreund
- Edith Heerdegen
- Wilhelm Borchert
- Pinkas Braun
- Friedrich G. Beckhaus
- Kurt Buecheler
- Dietrich Frauboes
- Jacques Breuer
- Wolf Goldan
- Renate Grosser
- Heinz Spitzner
- Klaus Miedel
- Arnold Marquis
- Otto Czarski

== See also ==
- List of Germans who resisted Nazism

== Sources ==
- Hans Fallada: Jeder stirbt für sich allein. Roman. Aufbau-Verlag Berlin, ungekürzte Neuauflage 2011, 704 S., ISBN 978-3-351-03349-1
