= Ołobok =

Ołobok may refer to the following places in Poland:

- Ołobok, Lower Silesian Voivodeship (south-west Poland)
- Ołobok, Greater Poland Voivodeship (west-central Poland)
- Ołobok, Lubusz Voivodeship (west Poland)
