= Parowa, Lower Silesian Voivodeship =

Parowa
- Village
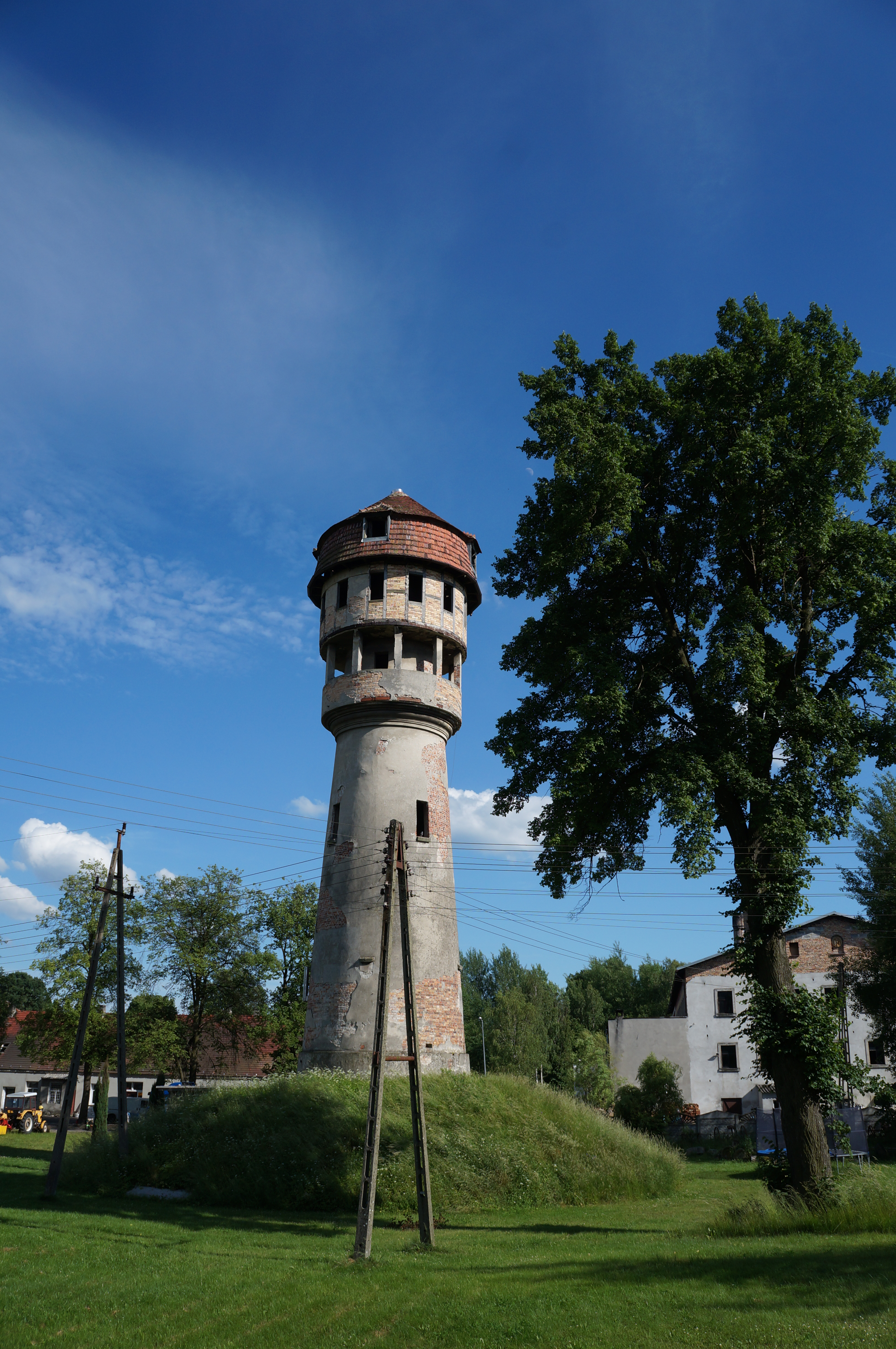
- Water tower in Parowa

- Location within Poland
- Coordinates: 51°21′48″N 15°16′49″E
- Country: Poland
- Voivodeship: Lower Silesian
- County: Bolesławiec
- Gmina: Osiecznica

Population
  - Total: 950

Parowa [paˈrɔva] is a village in the administrative district of Gmina Osiecznica, within Bolesławiec County, Lower Silesian Voivodeship, in south-western Poland.
