= Hildegard Knef =

German actress (1925–2002)

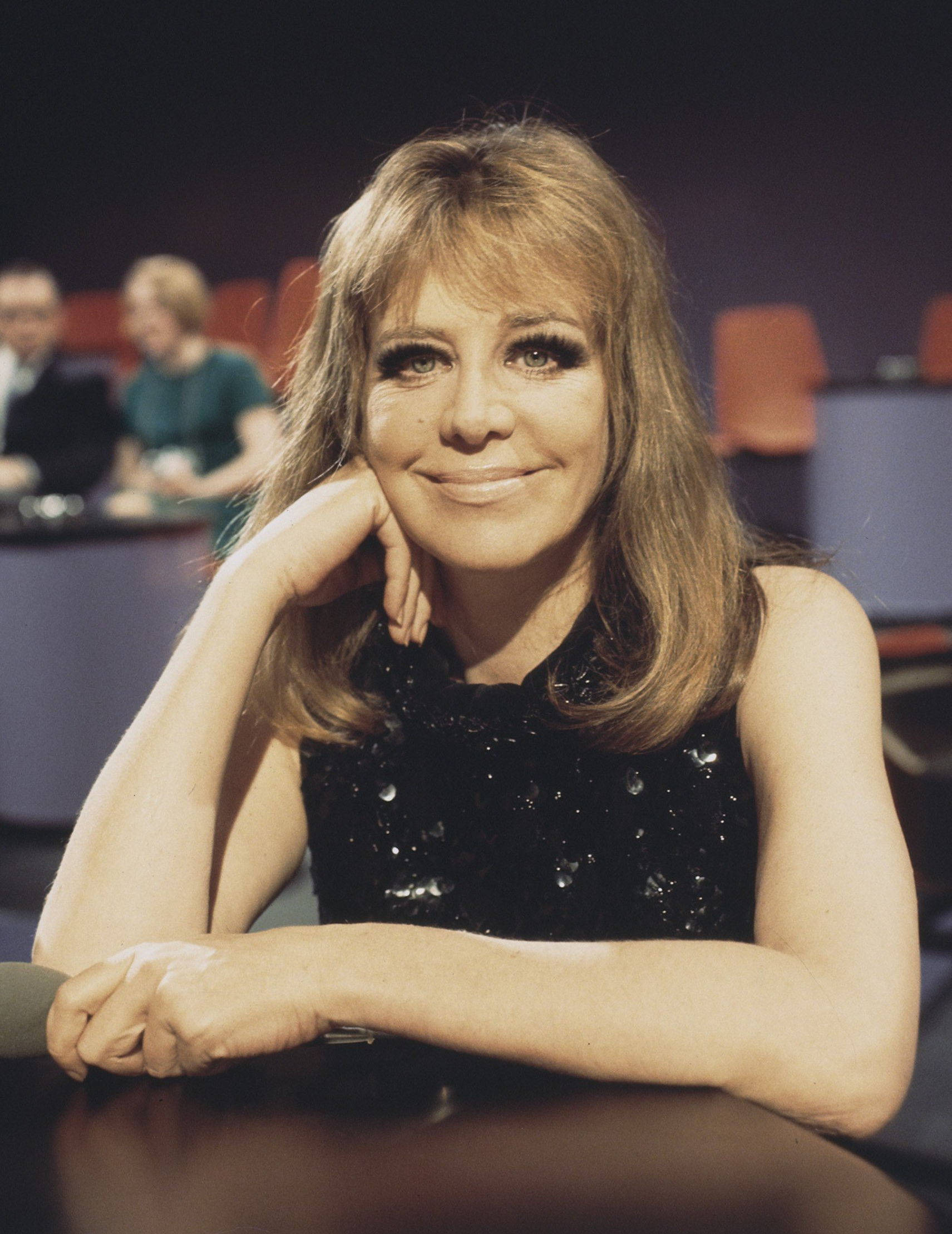
- Knef in 1969
- Born: Hildegard Frieda Albertine Knef; 28 December 1925; Ulm, Württemberg, German Reich
- Died: 1 February 2002 (aged 76); Berlin, Germany
- Occupations: Actress; singer; writer
- Years active: 1944–2001
- Spouse(s): Kurt Hirsch (m. 1947; div. 1952) David Palastanga (m. 1962; div. 1976) Paul von Schell (m. 1977)
- Children: 1

Hildegard Frieda Albertine Knef (Note: German: [ˈhɪldəɡaʁt ˈkneːf]); (28 December 1925 – 1 February 2002) was an actress, singer, and writer from Ulm in Germany. She became a US citizen in 1950, but renewed her German citizenship in 2001.

Knef began her career in Berlin during World War II, and soon became well known for films including Die Mörder Sind Unter Uns (Note: Murderers Among Us) in 1946, then Film Ohne Titel (Note: Film Without A Title) in 1948. In 1950, she played the lead in the controversial melodrama Die Sünderin (Note: The Sinner), before relocating to New York City, where she starred in the musical Silk Stockings.

During the 1960s, she rebuilt her career in Germany as a pop-singer and author, in particular her memoirs Der Geschenkte Gaul (Note: The Gift Horse) She died in Berlin in February 2002.

== Family and childhood ==
Hildegard Knef was born in Ulm in 1925, the daughter of Hans Theodor Knef, a tobacco merchant of Flemish heritage and decorated First World War veteran, and his wife Frieda Auguste Knef (née Gröhn). When she was six months old her father died of syphilis. After that, she and her mother moved to Berlin where her mother worked in a factory and Hildegard attended middle school in Schöneberg. She began studying acting in 1940 at age 14. She left school at age 15 to become an apprentice animator with Universum Film AG. After she had a successful screen test, she went to the State Film School at Babelsberg, Berlin where she studied acting, ballet, and elocution. Joseph Goebbels, who was Hitler's propaganda minister, wrote to her and asked to meet her but Knef's friends warned her to stay away from him.

In 1933 her mother married Wilhelm Wulfestieg, a master shoemaker and leather goods manufacturer. This marriage produced Knef's half-brother, the jazz musician Heinz Wulfestieg. He died in August 1978 in Berlin at age 43 under mysterious circumstances. Hilde dealt with his sudden death in her book So Nicht (Not Like This).

Hildegard Knef's stepfather lost his factory because his Jewish business partner was forced to flee and he could not align himself with the National Socialists. Thereafter the family ran a shoe repair shop in Berlin. Along with school, Knef took care of the household, worked in the shop and delivered the repaired shoes at night.

== Marriages ==
Hildegard Knef was married three times:

- from 1947 to 1952 to Kurt Hirsch, a Jewish-American who came from the Sudetenland. Hirsch emigrated to the USA before the war and enlisted at age 20 in the US military. During his marriage to Knef he worked in Hollywood unsuccessfully as a talent agent.
- from 1962 to 1976 to the British actor David Cameron (David Antonio Palastanga) who appeared together with her on a tour through Germany in Nicht von Gestern (Not Born Yesterday). He is the father of her daughter Christina Antonia, married name Gardiner (born May 16, 1968 in Munich, called "Tinta").
- from 1977 until her death in 2002 to Paul Rudolf Freiherr von Schell zu Bauschlott who came from an old line of Austrian-Hungarian nobility (born Nov. 28, 1940).

== UFA years ==
At 15 years of age, Hildegard left school after completing the middle grade and began training as an artist in the animated film department of UFA (a film company headquartered in Berlin) in central Berlin. In 1943 the film head, Wolfgang Liebeneiner took notice of her, and she begain training as an actress. Her acting coaches were Karl Meixner and Else Bongers, head of youth training at the time and who became a life-long mentor and advisor to Knef. In 1944 Knef had a love-affair with Ewald von Demandowsky, a script editor for "films of the Reich", who was also head of production at the film company Tobis. Even before the end of the war Knef made her first film appearances (among others Under The Bridges, 1944/46; Journey To Happiness, 1944/48).

When the film Träumerei was made in 1944, Knef shot some scenes, which would have marked her film debut, but these were left out of the final cut. She did appear in several films before the fall of Nazi Germany, but most were released only afterward.

During the Battle of Berlin she dressed as a soldier to stay with her lover, Ewald von Demandowsky, and joined him in the defence of Schmargendorf. The Soviets captured her and sent her to a prison camp. Her fellow prisoners helped her escape and return to Berlin. Von Demandowsky was executed by the Russians on 7 October 1946, but before that he secured for Knef the protection of the well-known character actor Viktor de Kowa in Berlin. De Kowa gave her the opportunity to be a mistress of ceremonies in the theatre that he had opened. Knef also got a part in Marcel Pagnol's Marius, which was directed by Boleslaw Barlog. De Kowa also directed Knef in other plays by Shakespeare, Pagnol, and George Abbott.

== Film career ==
Her two best-known film roles were Susanne Wallner in Wolfgang Staudte's film Die Mörder sind unter uns (The Murderers Are Among Us), produced in 1946 by the DEFA (East German state film company) and the first film released after the Second World War in East Germany; and Marina in Die Sünderin (The Sinner), in which she performed a brief nude scene, the first in German film history, which caused a scandal in 1951. The film was also criticised by the Catholic Church, which protested against the nude scene. Knef stated that she didn't understand the tumult that the film was creating. She wrote that it was totally absurd that people considered her nudity to be scandalous, as Germany was the country that had created Auschwitz and had caused so much horror. She also wrote, "I had the scandal, the producers got the money."

In 1948 she received the best-actress award from the Locarno Film Festival because of her role in the film Film Without a Title.

In the 1960s she appeared in a number of low-budget films, including The Lost Continent.

She appeared in the 1975 screen adaptation of the Hans Fallada novel Every Man Dies Alone directed by Alfred Vohrer, released in English as Everyone Dies Alone in 1976, and for which she won an award for best actress at the International Film Festival in Karlovy Vary, then Czechoslovakia.

During her career she performed in more than 50 films. Nineteen of her films were produced in countries other than Germany: the United States, United Kingdom, France, Italy, Austria and Spain.

== Career in the United States ==
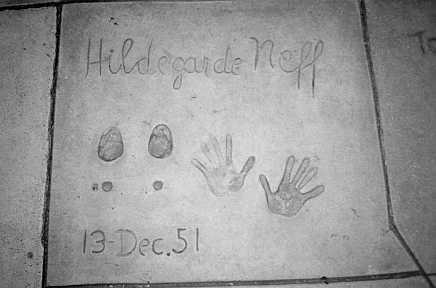
Knef's hand and footprints at Grauman's Chinese Theatre, Hollywood

David O. Selznick invited her to Hollywood, but she refused to agree to the conditions of the contract which reportedly included changing her name to Gilda Christian and pretending to be Austrian rather than German. Knef was cast as Hilde in the Hollywood film Decision Before Dawn (1951), directed by Anatole Litvak and co-starring with Richard Basehart and Oskar Werner in a story about the later part of World War II.

The following year Knef's first husband, an American named Kurt Hirsch, encouraged her to try again for success in the U.S. She changed her name from Knef to Neff, but was offered only a supporting role in The Snows of Kilimanjaro (1952), an adaptation of an Ernest Hemingway short story.

Her reputation in the U.S. was hurt because of her nude scenes in the German film Die Sünderin (1951) and because she fell in love with a Nazi when she was 19.

Finally, in 1955, Knef was offered a starring role in the Broadway musical Silk Stockings by Cole Porter, which was based on the 1939 film Ninotchka, which had starred Greta Garbo in the title role. Knef had acted in at least 30 films in the United States and Europe but her triumph came in New York when she played Ninotchka, an unemotional Soviet commissar. The New York Times drama critic Brooks Atkinson described her rendition as "an immensely skillful performance."

== Singer ==
Her singing career started in the 1960s once her film career was not going very well. She performed in television shows such as episodes of Scarecrow and Mrs King and a 2000 documentary in which she was playing by herself Marlene Dietrich: Her Own Song. In the 1960s she appeared in a number of low-budget films, including The Lost Continent.

In the 1960s Knef took a break from acting and started writing song lyrics. In 1963 she started a concert and recording career, and she surprised her audiences with the deep, smoky quality of her voice and with lyrics she wrote herself. Fans around the world rallied to her support as she recovered from cancer several times. She returned to Berlin after Reunification. At her peak, an entertainment columnist called her the "willowy blonde" who had a "dusty voice" and a "generous mouth".

The song she is mostly remembered for is "Für mich soll's rote Rosen regnen" ("Let it rain red roses for me"). She is also known for her version of the songs "Ich hab noch einen Koffer in Berlin" ("I still have a suitcase in Berlin") and "Mackie Messer" ("Mack the Knife"). She sold more than three million records in total.

She launched 23 original albums with 320 different songs. She wrote the lyrics for 130 songs herself.

== Publications ==
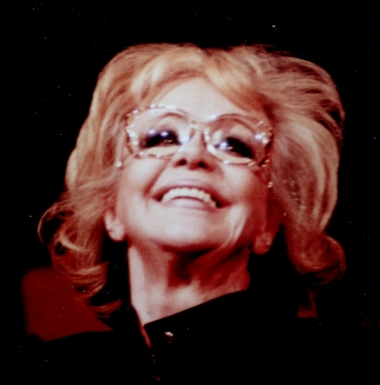
Knef, aged 69, at her last concert (5 March 1995) in Berlin

Her autobiography Der geschenkte Gaul: Bericht aus einem Leben (The Gift Horse: Report on a Life, 1970) was a candid recount of her life in Germany during and after the Second World War, and reportedly became the best-selling German book in the post-war years. Her second book Das Urteil (The Verdict, 1975) was a moderate success, and dealt with her struggle with breast cancer. Knef not only achieved international best-seller status, her books were also widely praised by critics because her autobiographies were "better-than-the-average celebrity's".

In The Gift Horse: Report on a Life Knef recounted her childhood and difficult life being an actress and singer while living in Hitler's Berlin and after the war in Europe and America. Arthur Cooper of Newsweek called it "a bitterly honest book and a very good one". The book doesn't try to persuade the public, depicting a made-up celebrity's adventures, but truthfully recounts her struggles as a German woman who grew up in Berlin under the Nazis.The Gift Horse: Report on a Life was translated to English by Knef's second husband, David Anthony Palastanga.

In The Verdict, which was also translated by Palastanga, Knef looked at her life from another perspective, because she knew that she had cancer. Rachel MacKenzie wrote that Knef had her 56th operation, a mastectomy, in Salzburg on 10 August 1973. MacKenzie stated that from that cancer surgery, life had to be thought of in terms of pre-verdict and post-verdict. The book is divided in these two sections but they are not chronologically ordered because Knef wrote the two sections in a way that the reader is moved forward and backward in time and space. The Verdict describes in great detail the hospital scenes as well as the doctors and nurses in New York, Los Angeles, Zürich and Hamburg, where she was hospitalised.

== Personal life ==
Knef was married three times and divorced twice. Her first marriage was in 1947 to Kurt Hirsch, a U.S. information officer. They divorced in 1952. On 30 June 1962, she married the British actor and record producer David Cameron (David Anthony Palastanga), with whom she had a daughter, Christina Antonia, born in 1968. When she died, she was still married to her third husband, Paul von Schell.

On 1 February 2002, Knef died at the age of 76 of a lung infection in Berlin, where she had moved after German reunification. She smoked heavily for most of her life and suffered from emphysema.

== Selected filmography ==
- The Noltenius Brothers (1945)
- Frühlingsmelodie (1945) - Zwilling ohne Leberfleck
- Under the Bridges (1946) - Girl in Havelberg
- The Murderers Are Among Us (1946) - Susanne Wallner
- Between Yesterday and Tomorrow (1947) - Das Mädchen Kat
- Film Without a Title (1948) - Christine Fleming
- Journey to Happiness (1948) - Susanne Loevengaard
- The Sinner (1951) - Marina
- Miracles Still Happen (1951) - Anita Weidner
- Decision Before Dawn (1951) - Hilde
- Nights on the Road (1952) - Inge Hoffmann
- Diplomatic Courier (1952) - Janine Betki
- The Snows of Kilimanjaro (1952) - Countess Liz
- Night Without Sleep (1952) - Lisa Muller
- Alraune (1952) - Alraune
- Henriette (1952) - Rita Solar
- Illusion in a Minor Key (1952) - Lydia Bauer
- The Man Between (1953) - Bettina
- A Love Story (1954) - Lili Schallweiß, Schauspielerin
- It Was Always So Nice With You (1954) - minor role (uncredited)
- Confession Under Four Eyes (1954) - Hilde Schaumburg-Garden
- Svengali (1954) - Trilby
- Escape from Sahara (1958) - Madeleine Durand
- The Daughter of Hamburg (1958) - Maria
- Subway in the Sky (1959) - Lilli Hoffman
- The Man Who Sold Himself (1959) - Martina Schilling
- La strada dei giganti (1960) - Maria Luisa di Borbone
- No Orchids for Lulu (1962) - Baroness Geschwitz
- Ipnosi (1962)
- Caterina di Russia (1963) - Catherine the Great
- Landru (1963) - Mme X. / Madame Ixe
- The Threepenny Opera (1963) - Jenny Diver
- Ballade pour un voyou (1963) - Martha Schwartz
- And So to Bed (1963) - Callgirl
- Gibraltar (1964) - Elinor van Berg
- Mark of the Tortoise (1964) - Laura Lorelli
- Condemned to Sin (1964) - Alwine
- Mozambique (1964) - Ilona Valdez
- The Dirty Dozen (1967) - (uncredited)
- The Lost Continent (1968) - Eva Peters
- The Legend of Lylah Clare (1969) - voice of Lylah Clare
- Everyone Dies Alone (1976) - Anna Quangel
- Fedora (1978) - The Countess
- Why the UFOs Steal Our Lettuce (1980) - Peter's mother
- Der Gärtner von Toulouse (1982) - Frau Théophot
- The Future of Emily (1984) - Mutter Paula
- Witchery (1988) - Lady in black
- Pocahontas (1995) - (German dub)
- An Almost Perfect Wedding (1999) - Marlene Wolf-Schönberg - Hennys aunt

== Books ==
- Knef, Hildegard (1970). Der geschenkte Gaul: Bericht aus einem Leben (in German). Wien: Fritz Molden. ISBN 9783217008588.
- Knef, Hildegard (1972). Ich brauch' Tapetenwechsel: Texte (in German). Wien: Molden. ISBN 3-217-00457-4.
- Knef, Hildegard (1975). Das Urteil oder der Gegenmensch (in German). Wien: Molden. ISBN 9783217006546.
- Knef, Hildegard; Kossatz, Hans (1976). Heimweh-Blues (in German). Berlin: A. und E. Freund. ISBN 9783921532034.
- Knef, Hildegard (1978). Nichts als Neugier: Interviews zu Fragen der Parapsychologie (in German). München: Goldmann. ISBN 9783442036905.
- Knef, Hildegard (1982). So nicht (in German). Hamburg: Knaus. ISBN 9783813580921.
- Knef, Hildegard (1983). Romy: Betrachtung eines Lebens (in German). Hamburg: Knaus. ISBN 9783813504439.
