= Kliczków =

- Village
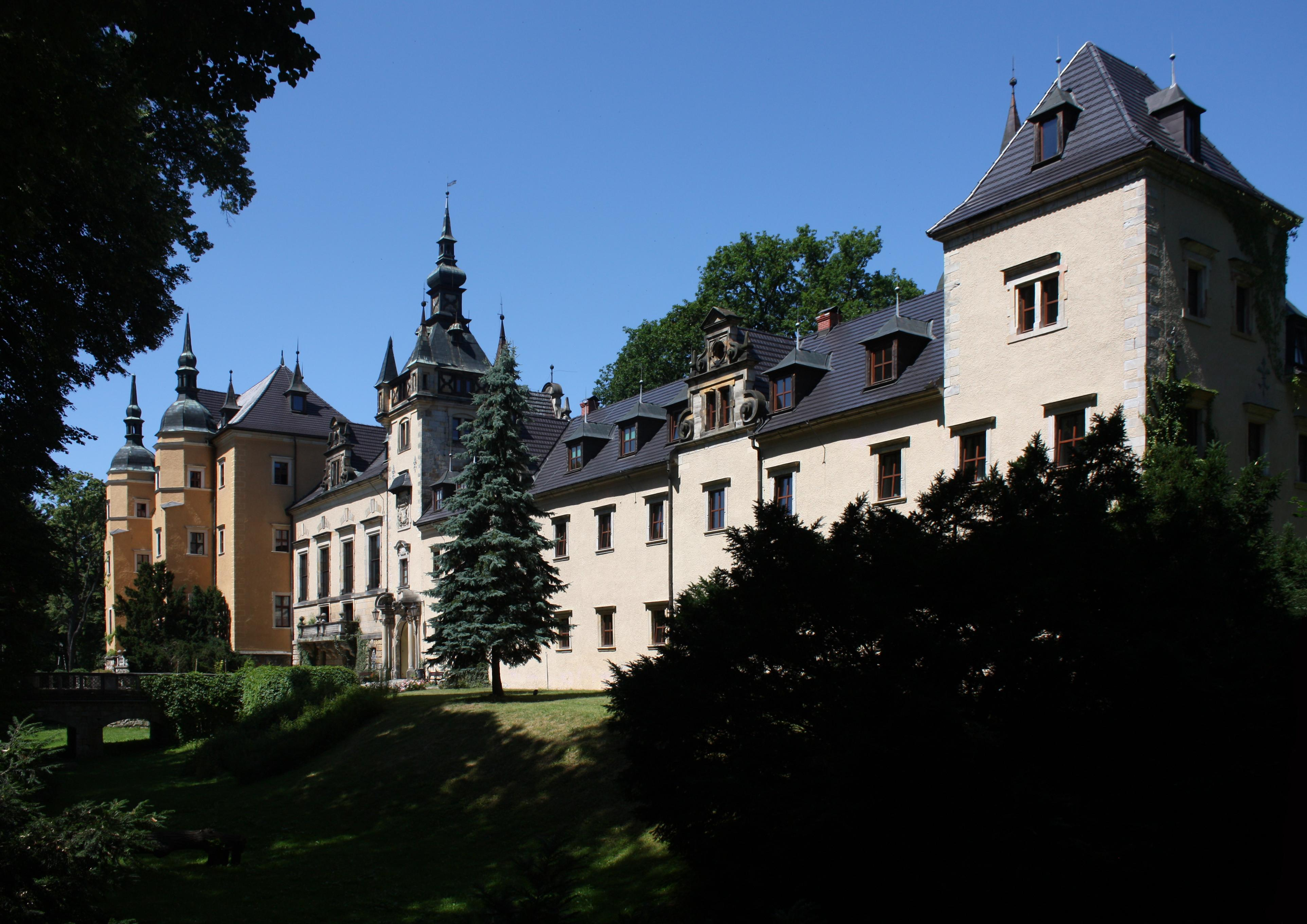
- Kliczków Castle

- Location within Poland
- Coordinates: 51°20′N 15°26′E
- Country: Poland
- Voivodeship: Lower Silesian
- County: Bolesławiec
- Gmina: Osiecznica

Population
  - Total: 350
- Time zone: UTC+1 (CET)
  - Summer (DST): UTC+2 (CEST)
- Postal code: 59-724
- Vehicle registration: DBL

Kliczków [ˈklit͡ʂkuf] is a village in the administrative district of Gmina Osiecznica, within Bolesławiec County, Lower Silesian Voivodeship, in south-western Poland. Kliczków is the location of a notable castle dating from 1297.

== History ==
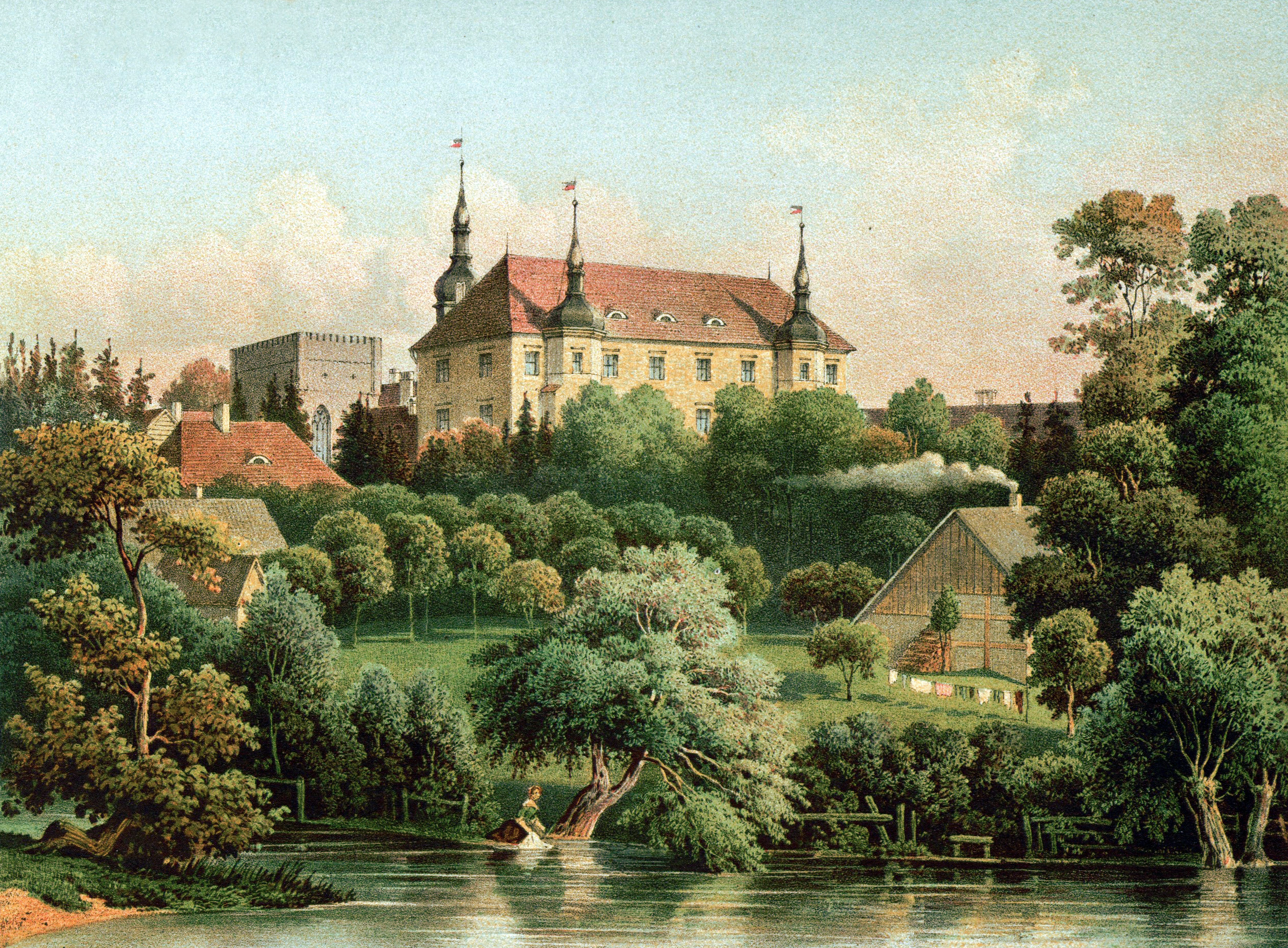
19th-century view of the castle

The history of the village dates back to the 13th century, when it was located on the border of the regions Lower Silesia and Upper Lusatia. The castle, constructed in 1297, served as a stronghold for knights. The remains of the former medieval stronghold are still intact, most notably, a rectangular stone keep (tower) on the western side. The initial purpose of the castle was to defend the Duchy of Świdnica and Jawor, then the southwesternmost duchy of fragmented Piast-ruled Poland.

Subsequently, in the 14th century, the building changed its architectural character and purpose to serve as a manor house for wealthy nobles. Ruling aristocratic clans, like the German Rechenberg Family, greatly expanded the structure and adapted it to modern use. In the 19th century, the complex was restructured and redesigned once again. The palatial-styled fairy tale castle was located alongside a large, 80 hectare English garden. The castle was confiscated by Nazi Germany during World War II.

In Kliczków, Prince Friedrich of Solms-Baruth was responsible for creating, beside the traditional family mausoleum, a cemetery for his most beloved horses and pets. Nowadays, there are only two surviving tombstones from at least a dozen that once stood in the graveyard.

The overall Gothic and Renaissance Revival style of the castle make it a unique architectural gem in the region. The castle itself is a popular tourist spot in Lower Silesia.
