= Gmina Osiecznica =

Gmina Osiecznica Osiecznica Commune
- Gmina
- Coat of arms
- Interactive map of Gmina Osiecznica
- Coordinates (Osiecznica): 51°19′39″N 15°25′10″E
- Country: Poland
- Voivodeship: Lower Silesian
- County: Bolesławeiec
- Seat: Osiecznica
- Sołectwos: Ławszowa, Ołobok, Osiecznica-Kliczków, Osieczów, Parowa, Przejęsław, Świętoszów, Tomisław

Area
  - Total: 437.07 km^{2} (168.75 sq mi)

Population (2019-06-30)
  - Total: 7,396
  - Density: 16.92/km^{2} (43.83/sq mi)
- Website: http://www.osiecznica.ug.gov.pl

Gmina Osiecznica is a rural gmina (administrative district) in Bolesławiec County, Lower Silesian Voivodeship, in south-western Poland. Its seat is the village of Osiecznica, which lies approximately 13 kilometres (8.1 mi) north-west of Bolesławiec and 116 km (72 mi) west of the regional capital Wrocław.

The gmina covers an area of 437.07 square kilometres (168.75 sq mi), and as of 2019 its total population is 7,396.

== Neighbouring gminas ==
Gmina Osiecznica is bordered by the gminas of Bolesławiec, Iłowa, Małomice, Nowogrodziec, Szprotawa, Węgliniec and Żagań.

== Villages ==
The gmina contains the villages of Bronowiec, Długokąty, Jelenie Rogi, Jeziory, Kliczków, Ławszowa, Luboszów, Ołobok, Osiecznica, Osieczów, Parowa, Poświętne, Przejęsław, Świętoszów and Tomisław.
