= Tomisław, Lower Silesian Voivodeship =

Tomisław
- Village
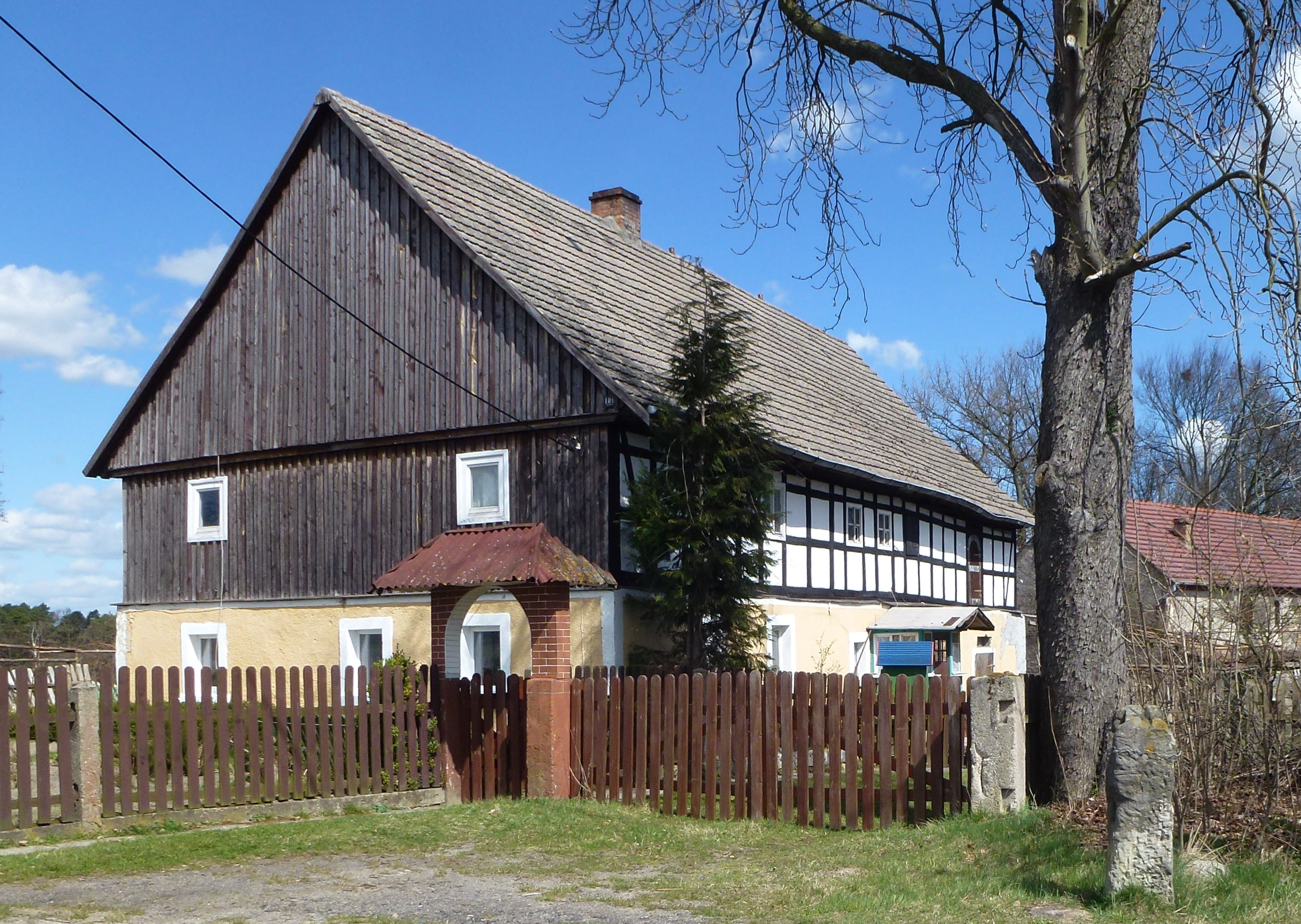

- Location within Poland
- Coordinates: 51°19′37″N 15°25′18″E
- Country: Poland
- Voivodeship: Lower Silesian
- County: Bolesławiec
- Gmina: Osiecznica
- Time zone: UTC+1 (CET)
  - Summer (DST): UTC+2 (CEST)
- Postal code: 59-724
- Vehicle registration: DBL

Tomisław [tɔˈmiswaf] is a village in the administrative district of Gmina Osiecznica, within Bolesławiec County, Lower Silesian Voivodeship, in south-western Poland. It is situated on the Kwisa river, approximately 13 km (8 mi) north-west of Bolesławiec and 115 km (71 mi) west of the regional capital Wrocław.
