= Długokąty, Lower Silesian Voivodeship =

Długokąty
- Village
- Location within Poland
- Coordinates: 51°21′28″N 15°18′46″E
- Country: Poland
- Voivodeship: Lower Silesian
- County: Bolesławiec
- Gmina: Osiecznica
- Time zone: UTC+1 (CET)
  - Summer (DST): UTC+2 (CEST)
- Vehicle registration: DBL

Długokąty [dwuɡɔˈkɔntɨ] is a village in the administrative district of Gmina Osiecznica, within Bolesławiec County, Lower Silesian Voivodeship, in south-western Poland.
