= Falk Harnack =

German director and screenwriter

- Born: 2 March 1913; Stuttgart, Germany
- Died: 3 September 1991 (aged 78); Berlin, Germany
- Occupation: Film director
- Years active: 1940–1976

Falk Harnack (2 March 1913 – 3 September 1991) was a German director and screenwriter. During Germany's Nazi era, he was also active with the German Resistance and toward the end of World War II, the partisans in Greece. Harnack was from a family of scholars, artists and scientists, several of whom were active in the anti-Nazi Resistance and paid with their lives.

== Early life ==
Falk Erich Walter Harnack was the younger son of the painter Clara Harnack (née Reichau) and literary historian Otto Harnack; a nephew of the theologian Adolf von Harnack and Erich Harnack, professor of pharmacology and chemistry; the grandson of theologian Theodosius Harnack and the younger brother of the jurist and German Resistance fighter Arvid Harnack. He was also a cousin of the theologian Dietrich Bonhoeffer and Ernst von Harnack, who, like his brother and sister-in-law, Mildred Harnack, also became victims of the Third Reich. (Note: Others who were close to Harnack and were executed by the SS were his cousin Klaus Bonhoeffer and Hans von Dohnanyi, who was Klaus and Dietrich Bonhoeffer's brother-in-law.) Harnack never got to know his father, who committed suicide in 1914.

Through his older brother, Harnack early learned about humanism through which he came into contact with people who later became members of the Red Orchestra. The acquaintances made a big impression on him and so he recoiled from Nazi propaganda. After going to school in Weimar, he continued his education near Jena, where he received his abitur in 1932. In 1933, he began attending university, first at the Friedrich Wilhelm University of Berlin and after 1934 at the Ludwig-Maximilians-Universität München. There, in May, he took part in disseminating fliers against the National Socialist German Students' League. He received his doctorate with a dissertation on Karl Bleibtreu in 1936 and the following year, he began working at the Nationaltheater Weimar and the state theatre in Altenburg. He worked there as a director until 1940, when he was drafted into the Wehrmacht.

== War years ==
In 1942, Hans Scholl, Alexander Schmorell and other members of the Munich Resistance group the White Rose got in touch with Harnack through Lilo Ramdohr, a mutual friend who had gone to school with Harnack. Through him, they hoped to build a relationship with the Berlin Resistance members who were involved with Harnack's brother, Arvid, Harro Schulze-Boysen, Hans von Dohnanyi and others. Harnack put them in touch with his cousins, Klaus and Dietrich Bonhoeffer. The same year, the Gestapo intercepted communications revealing the existence of the Red Orchestra and leading to numerous arrests. Many of those arrested were later executed, including Harnack's brother on 22 December 1942 and, on 16 February 1943, his sister-in-law, Mildred Harnack, an American citizen. Ramdohr was engaged to Falk Harnack, which Arvid mentioned in his farewell letter to his family that was written hours before his execution.

Though his brother had just been executed, Harnack went to Munich to meet with Sophie and Hans Scholl on 3 February 1943. He and Hans agreed to meet again on 25 February, but Harnack waited in vain since he had already been arrested and executed, along with his sister. Thirteen other members of the White Rose were taken into custody, including Kurt Huber, Willi Graf and Harnack. Of the lot, Harnack was the only one acquitted. The others were found guilty and condemned to death, some being executed the same day they were tried by the Volksgerichtshof, the civilian "People's Court". On 19 April 1943, Harnack was acquitted because of a lack of evidence and "unique special circumstances".

In August 1943, he was removed from service to the Wehrmacht and transferred to a penal battalion, the 999th Light Afrika Division, and sent to Greece. In December 1943, he was to be arrested and sent to a Nazi concentration camp, but his superior, Lieutenant Gerhard Fauth, tipped him off and helped him escape. He then joined the Greek partisans fighting the Nazis, worked with the Greek People's Liberation Army (ELAS) and co-founded the Anti-Fascist Committee for a Free Germany (AKFD) with Gerhard Reinhardt and became the leader of the organisation.

== Postwar years ==
After the war, Harnack returned to his career as a director and dramaturge, first working at the Bavarian state theater in Munich. In 1947, he began working at the Deutsches Theater in Berlin. From 1949 to 1952, he was the artistic director at DEFA, where he made the film The Axe of Wandsbek, adapted from a book by Arnold Zweig. According to Zweig's son, the movie is based on a true story and may also relate to the events of Altona Bloody Sunday in Hamburg.

The main character carries out a Nazi execution though he ruins his business, marriage and life over it. Opening to positive reactions from the public, the film met with disapproval from the Socialist Unity Party and its Soviet advisors, who felt that the movie's political position was not clear enough. One such adviser said that the film had "an undesired and deleterious effect on people in the GDR, as it does not depict hatred of fascism, but rather pity for the murderers". The government banned the movie within weeks. The poet and playwright Bertolt Brecht remarked after the banning, "It is important to emphasize that there can be no sympathy for a Nazi executioner". After all that Harnack had lost to the Nazis, the dispute hit him hard, and in 1952, he left East Germany for West Berlin.

For the first few years, Harnack worked for the film production company CCC Film and, along with Helmut Käutner and Wolfgang Staudte, was one of the most important directors of German post-war films.

From the late 1950s, however, he worked almost exclusively in television. He also wrote the screenplays for many of his films. From 1962 to 1965, he was the leading director of the newly founded German television station, ZDF. Subsequently, he worked primarily as a free lance. In addition to entertainment, he also made challenging films, which sometimes dealt with the Nazi era and the Resistance, such as his 1955 release The Plot to Assassinate Hitler (Der 20. Juli) about the 20 20 July 1944 plot to assassinate Adolf Hitler, which won the 1956 German Film Award in the category "Films Contributing to the Encouragement of Democratic Thought". In 1962, he directed for television, Jeder stirbt für sich allein, an adaptation of Hans Fallada's novel, Every Man Dies Alone, based on the story of Otto and Elise Hampel, a working-class couple who became involved in the anti-Nazi Resistance but were later executed.

== Recognition and personal ==
Commenting retrospectively on Harnack's filmmaking, film historian Gerhard Schoenberner noted that, working at "a time when West German postwar film had sunk to ... [an] artistic and political low", Harnack had "set new standards" in both the film industry and exposing the "false glorification of the past", which "had become fashionable during the Adenauer period, as a result of the Cold War."

Harnack was married to German actress Käthe Braun, who was often in his films. He died on 3 September 1991, aged 78, after a long illness.

== Awards (selected) ==
- 1940 Goethe Medal of the German National Theater Weimar
- 1952 DEFA, Gold pin
- 1959 Guild of the German Stage, Silver pin
- 1977 Honorary Certificate, Union of Persecutees of the Nazi Regime
- 1983 Filmband in Gold for "Longstanding and Excellent Work in German Film"
- 1989 Order of Merit of the Federal Republic of Germany, Officer's Cross

== Filmography ==
- 1951: The Axe of Wandsbek (based on a novel by Arnold Zweig) – with Erwin Geschonneck, Käthe Braun, Claus Holm, Gisela May
- 1954: Roman eines Frauenarztes (based on a novel by Curt Riess) – with Rudolf Prack, Anne-Marie Blanc, Winnie Markus, Jan Hendriks
- 1955: The Plot to Assassinate Hitler – with Wolfgang Preiss, Annemarie Düringer, Wolfgang Büttner
- 1956: Night of Decision – with Carl Raddatz, Hilde Krahl, Albert Lieven
- 1956: The Story of Anastasia – with Lilli Palmer, Ivan Desny, Ellen Schwiers, Tilla Durieux
- 1957: The Night of the Storm – with Lilli Palmer, Ivan Desny, Susanne Cramer, Siegfried Schürenberg
- 1958: Restless Night (based on a story by Albrecht Goes) – with Bernhard Wicki, Ulla Jacobsson, Hansjörg Felmy
- 1959: Arzt ohne Gewissen – with Ewald Balser, Wolfgang Preiss, Barbara Rütting, Wolfgang Kieling
- 1959: Der Fall Pinedus (TV film, based on a play by Paolo Levi) – with Alfred Balthoff, Franz Schafheitlin, Fritz Tillmann, Hans-Christian Blech
- 1960: Der Prozess Mary Dugan (TV film, based on The Trial of Mary Dugan) – with Anaid Iplicjian
- 1961: Die Marquise von Arcis (TV film, based on a play by Carl Sternheim) – with Alexander Kerst, Hilde Krahl, Brigitte Mira, Uta Sax
- 1962: Jeder stirbt für sich allein (TV film, based on Every Man Dies Alone) – with Edith Schultze-Westrum, Alfred Schieske, Anneli Granget, Hartmut Reck
- 1963: Die Wölfe (TV film, based on a play by Romain Rolland) – with Thomas Holtzmann, Martin Hirthe, Kurt Pieritz
- 1964: Manchmal spielt der Himmel mit (TV film) – with Wolf Ackva, Isolde Bräuner, Sascha Hehn
- 1964: Pamela (TV film, based on Pamela; or, Virtue Rewarded) – with Veronika Bayer, Christoph Bantzer, Gustav Fröhlich
- 1964: Ein Frauenarzt klagt an – Angeklagt: Dr. Thomas – with Dieter Borsche, Anita Höfer, Dietmar Schönherr, Hans Nielsen, Inge Meysel
- 1964: Und nicht mehr Jessica (TV film, based on Point of No Return) – with Horst Naumann, Margot Trooger, Wolf Ackva, Wolfgang Büttner, Marthe Keller
- 1965: Der Gärtner von Toulouse (TV film, based on a play by Georg Kaiser)
- 1966: Weiß gibt auf (TV film, based on a play by Frederic Raphael) – with Rudolf Platte, Siegfried Lowitz, Friedrich Schoenfelder, Doris Kirchner
- 1966: Die Ersten und die Letzten (TV film, based on The First and the Last) – with Arno Assmann
- 1966: Wer rettet unseren Ackerknecht (TV film, based on Who'll Save the Plowboy? by Frank D. Gilroy) – with Friedrich G. Beckhaus, Eva Pflug, Michael Degen
- 1967: Ein Schlaf Gefangener (TV film, based on A Sleep of Prisoners) – with Walter Buschhoff, Fritz Wepper, Paul Dahlke, Hellmut Lange
- 1967: Kampf um Kautschuk (TV film) – with Klausjürgen Wussow
- 1968: Die schwarze Sonne (TV film, based on Verlöschende Feuer by Horst Lange) – with Christine Ostermayer, Friedhelm Ptok, Wolfgang Völz, Maria Sebaldt
- 1968: Unwiederbringlich (TV film, based on Irretrievable by Theodor Fontane) – with Lothar Blumhagen, Solveig Thomas, Lil Dagover, Karin Hübner
- 1970: Ferdinand Graf von Zeppelin – Stunde der Entscheidung (TV film) – with Wolfgang Büttner, Gerd Baltus, Gisela Holzinger, Lis Verhoeven, Wolfgang Völz
- 1970: Peenemünde (two-part docudrama, TV) – with Dieter Kirchlechner, Wolfgang Preiss, Karl John, Heinz Engelmann
- 1971: Das Ding an sich und wie man es dreht (TV film) – with Friedrich G. Beckhaus, Friedrich W. Bauschulte, Horst Bollmann, Volkert Kraeft
- 1971: Ein Fall für Herrn Schmidt (TV film, based on a story by Wolfdietrich Schnurre) – with Klaus Schwarzkopf, Gaby Dohm, Heinz Meier, Käthe Braun
- 1973: Der Astronaut (TV film)
- 1973: Der Tote vom Pont Neuf (TV film)
- 1974: Der Verfolger (TV film, based on a novel by Günther Weisenborn) – with Gerd Böckmann, Kornelia Boje,
- 1974: Silverson (TV film) – with Herbert Bötticher, Gracia-Maria Kaus, Ernst Schröder, Isabell Stumpf
- 1975: Hier ruht George Dillon (TV film, based on Epitaph for George Dillon)
- 1976: Erika (TV film, based on a play by Ursula Krechel) – with Silvia Reize, Eva-Maria Bauer, Eva Brumby, Irmgard Riessen, Kyra Mladeck

== Audio plays ==
- 1946: Bolwieser
- 1972: Androklus und der Löwe (adaptation of George Bernard Shaw's Androcles and the Lion)
