= Kliczków Castle =

Historic site in Poland

- Zamek w Kliczkowie
- Kliczków in Poland
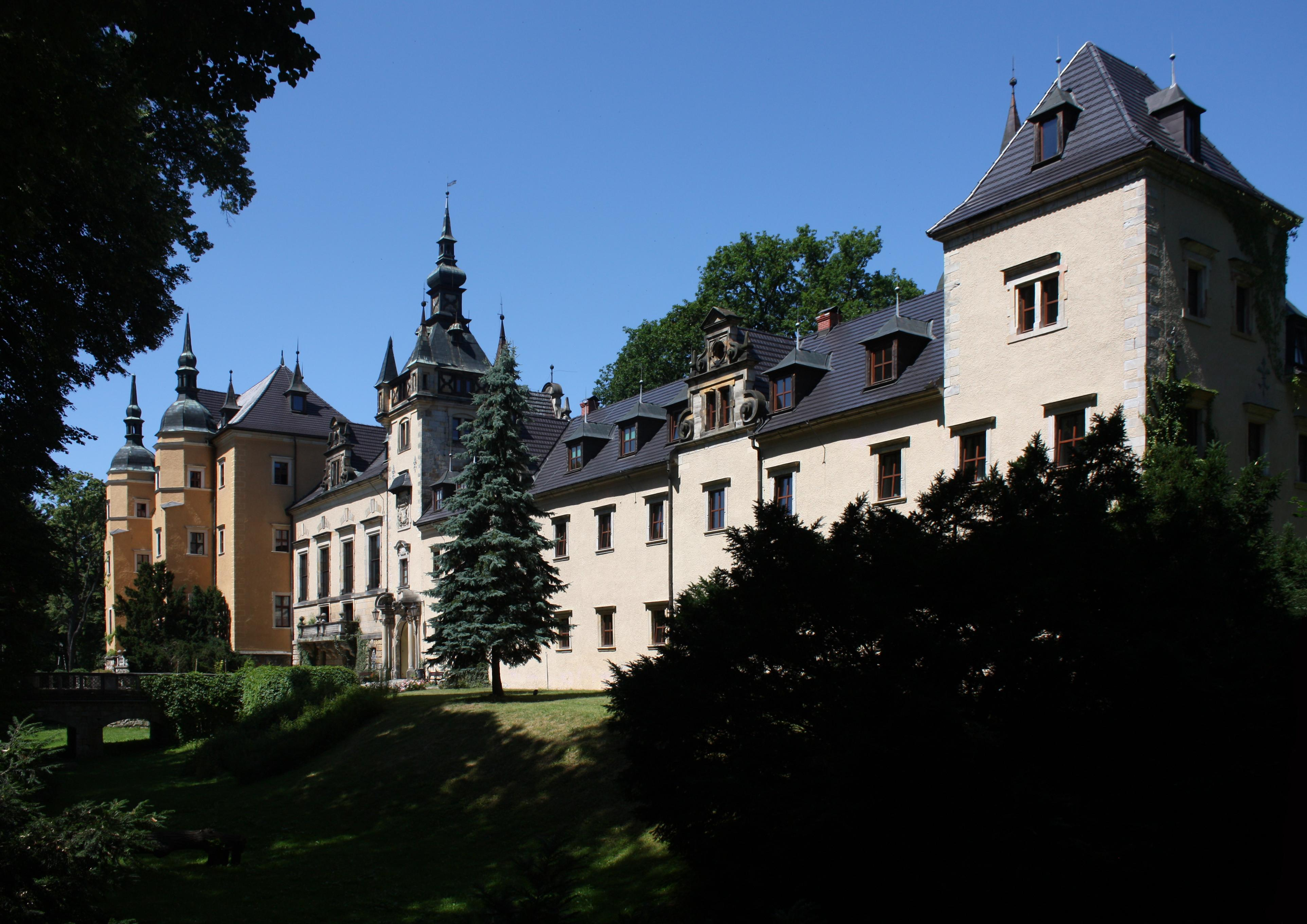

Site information
- Type: Castle
- Owner: A commercial company from Wrocław
- Open to the public: No
- Condition: In use as a conference center

Location
- Coordinates: 51.3125°N 15.5139°E

Site history
- Built: 1297

Kliczków Castle (German: Schloss Klitschdorf) is a late medieval castle in Kliczków in Poland.

== History ==
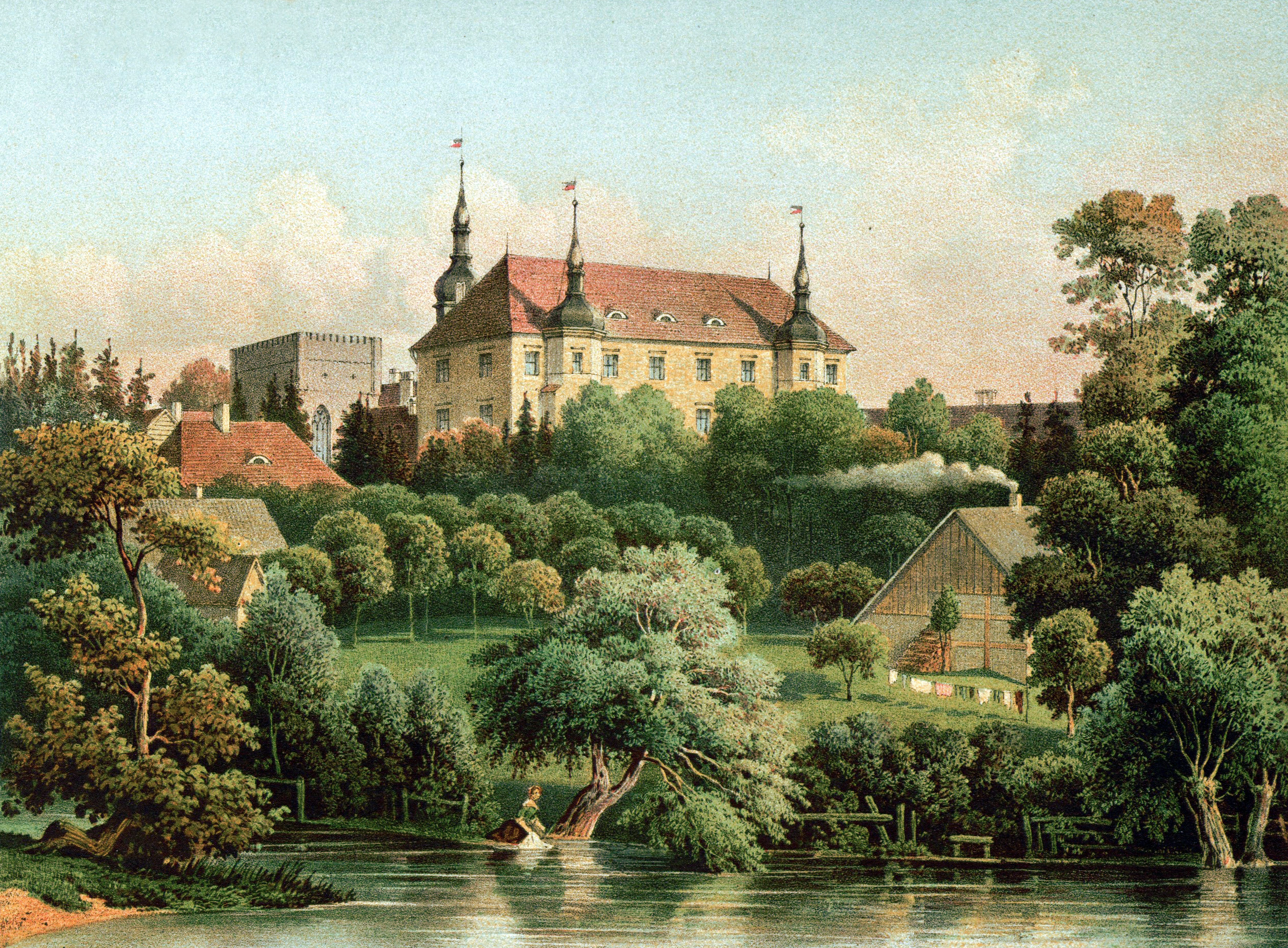
View of the Castle in c. 1860, from the collection of Alexander Duncker

Kliczków was founded as a border fortress at the river Kwisa by Duke Bolko I of Jawor in 1297. In 1391, it fell into the hands of the Rechenberg family from Saxony, who held it for almost 300 years.

The main building was built in 1585 in the Renaissance style. In 1611, King Matthias of Bohemia visited the castle.

After several more changes of ownership, it came to John Christian, Count of Solms-Baruth in 1767. In 1810, the grand ballroom in Empire style was created. In 1881, the architects Heinrich Joseph Kayser and Karl von Großheim from Berlin began an expansion of the castle. They mixed styles: English Gothic architecture with Italian Renaissance and French mannerism. An 80-acre English country garden was designed at the same time by Eduard Petzold. In 1906, Emperor Wilhelm II stayed at the castle while he was hunting in the area.

In 1920, it was inherited by Frederick of Solms-Baruth. The castle was owned by the Solms-Baruth dynasty until 1942. In Nazi Germany, he was engaged in resistance against National Socialism in the Kreisau Circle. He was arrested after the failed attempt on Hitler's life and his property was confiscated.

The castle survived the Second World War virtually unscathed, but the interior was looted by Soviet troops. In 1949, a fire destroyed the depot and the servants' quarters. In the 1950s, the castle was in the care of the local forest authority, which neglected the interior and ruined the stucco and the stoves. The former owner's horse cemetery was retained.

In 1971, the Wrocław University of Technology acquired the castle and tried in vain to save it. After the fall of Communism, a commercial company from Wrocław purchased the castle and developed it into a luxurious conference and recreation center that was opened in 1999.

== See also ==
- Castles in Poland
