= Alfred Schieske =

German actor

Alfred Schieske (6 September 1908 – 14 July 1970) was a German actor.

== Career ==
Schieske was born in Stuttgart, the son of a German father and a French mother. He studied acting with Willy Reichert made his stage debut at the Staatstheater Stuttgart at the age of 19. Afterward, he played in Heidelberg, Esslingen and Bochum. In 1940, he joined the Berlin Staatstheater, led by Gustaf Gründgens.

After World War II, Schieske first went to Cologne, then to Berlin in 1947, where he had an engagement at the Theater am Schiffbauerdamm, working there until 1950. He then worked at the Schiller and Schlosspark theaters in West Berlin, as well as in Düsseldorf, Recklinghausen and Jagsthausen. He also played guest roles at other theaters. In 1950 he played the role of camp commandant of Ravensbrück in the British film Odette.

Among the stage roles played by Schieske were Milota in König Ottokars Glück und Ende, Klesel in Ein Bruderzwist in Habsburg, Oberst Henry in Wilhelm Herzog's play about the Dreyfus Affair and Phil Cook in The Country Girl by Clifford Odets. He played several roles in German productions of Shakespeare; Bolingbroke in Richard II, Clarence in Richard III and Sir Toby Belch (German: Tobias Rülps) in Twelfth Night. He played Vladimir in Waiting for Godot, Adam in The Broken Jug, Götz in Götz von Berlichingen and Big Daddy in Cat on a Hot Tin Roof. In 1961, in one of his most successful roles, he began playing Alfred P. Doolittle (Eliza's father) in the musical My Fair Lady, first in Berlin, then Hamburg.

Schieske's most important film role was in the 1948 DEFA production, the Blum Affair, playing Otto Bonte, a criminal investigator who saves a Jewish man falsely accused of a crime, saves him and brings the real culprit to justice. In the 1960s, he acted on television in adaptations of literary works, such as Wer einmal aus dem Blechnapf frißt, based on Hans Fallada's novel Once a Jailbird, and Jeder stirbt für sich allein with Edith Schultze-Westrum and Anneli Granget, based on Fallada's Every Man Dies Alone.

Schieske's son, Geriet Schieske (1945-2023), was also an actor.

== Filmography ==
- Friedemann Bach (1941) - Wirt in Braunschweig (uncredited)
- Das tapfere Schneiderlein (1941) - Kriegsrat
- Back Then (1943) - Bassist
- Meine vier Jungens (1944) - Fritz Martens - Werkmeister
- Der Puppenspieler (1945) - Jochen Henke
- Die Schenke zur ewigen Liebe (1945) - Hauer Fritz
- Affaire Blum (1948) - Kriminalkommissar Otto Bonte
- Berliner Ballade (1948) - Herr Schneidewind, Politischer Redner
- Quartet of Five (1949) - Professor Mangold
- The Beaver Coat (1949) - Wulkow
- Odette (1950) - Camp Commandant
- A Day Will Come (1950) - Oberst Schedy
- The Guilt of Doctor Homma (1951)
- Big City Secret (1952)
- Inspektor Tondi (1952, TV Short) - Inspektor Tondi
- The Merry Vineyard (1952) - Dr. Unkelhäuser (uncredited)
- Children, Mother, and the General (1955) - Fahrer mit der Flasche
- The Plot to Assassinate Hitler (1955) - Fahrer mit der Flasche
- Night of Decision (1956) - André
- Dorothea Angermann (1959) - Pastor Angermann
- Der Fehltritt (1960, TV Movie) - Barossy
- Jenseits des Rheins (1960) - Fritz Keßler
- Wer einmal aus dem Blechnapf frißt (1961, TV Mini-Series) - Hauptwachtmeister Rusch
- Jeder stirbt für sich allein (1962, TV Movie) - Otto Quangel
- Das Leben ein Traum (1963, TV Movie) - Rosauras Diener
- Überstunden (1965, TV Movie) - Opa
- Romulus der Große (1965, TV Movie) - Cäsar Rupf
- Das Kriminalmuseum: Die Brille (1965, TV Series) - Kriminalkommissar Huberty
- Der Richter von London (1966, TV Movie) - Simon Eyre
- Kollege Crampton (1967, TV Movie) - Professor Crampton
- Wo liegt Jena? (1967, TV Movie) - Probst
- Flachsmann als Erzieher (1968, TV Movie) - Dr. Prell
- From Mice and Men (1968, TV Movie) - Chef
- Die Wilde (1968, TV Movie) - Monsieur Tarde
- Bitte recht freundlich, es wird geschossen (1969, TV Series) - Joe Baxter
- Zehn kleine Negerlein (1969, TV Movie) - Sir Lawrence Wargrave
- Michael Kohlhaas (1969)
- Pippi in the South Seas (1970) - Innkeeper
- Under the Roofs of St. Pauli (1970) - Egon Mills
- Peenemünde (1970, TV Movie) - Winston Churchill
- Das Feuerwerk (1971, TV Movie) - Vater
