= Gerhard Reinhardt =

Gerhard Reinhardt

Gerhard Reinhardt (May 4, 1916 – August 22, 1989) was an East German politician and German Resistance fighter against Nazism.

== Life and work ==
Reinhardt was born in Werdau, in the Kingdom of Saxony, a state of the German Empire. He was born into a family of textile workers and learned locksmithing, then travelled as a wandering journeyman through several European countries, including France, Switzerland and Austria. In 1930, he joined the Young Communist League of Germany.

After the Nazis seized power in 1933, Reinhardt became active in the German Resistance. He was arrested and in 1936, sentenced to a prison term in the Zuchthaus in Waldheim, Saxony. He worked as a machinist in Werdau between 1939 and 1942, when he was forced to fight in the 999th Light Afrika Division, a penal battalion. In 1943, he deserted and went to fight with the Greek partisans as part of the Anti-Fascist Committee for a Free Germany in Greece, which he co-founded with Falk Harnack. Later, he became its representative for the XIII Greek People's Liberation Army (ELAS) Division. He became a captain in ELAS before going to Yugoslavia, where he became an officer in the Second Austrian Freedom Battalion in the Third Yugoslavian Army.

He returned to Germany in summer 1945 and in 1946, became a member of the Socialist Unity Party. He went to work in the Land and Forest Ministry, part of the Ministry of the Interior. In 1961, he became the Secretary of the Central Committee for Jugendweihe; later, he became the Secretary of the central leadership of the Committees of the Anti-Fascist Resistance Fighters.

== Sources ==
- Strafdivision 999: Erlebnisse und Berichte aus dem antifaschistischen Widerstandskampf. Deutscher Militärverlag, Berlin (1965), p. 332 (in German)
- Andreas Herbst et al. (Ed.): So funktionierte die DDR. Volume 3: Lexikon der Funktionäre. Rowohlt, Reinbek (1994), p. 271 (in German)
- Gerd-Rüdiger Stephan et al. (Ed.): Die Parteien und Organisationen der DDR. Ein Handbuch. Dietz, Berlin (2002), p. 1060 (in German)
