= Luboszów =

- Village
- Location within Poland
- Coordinates: 51°25′35″N 15°23′38″E
- Country: Poland
- Voivodeship: Lower Silesian
- County: Bolesławiec
- Gmina: Osiecznica

Luboszów [luˈbɔʂuf] is a village in the administrative district of Gmina Osiecznica, within Bolesławiec County, Lower Silesian Voivodeship, in south-western Poland.

It is one of the smallest villages in Poland with only one household and two people registered. Polana, Gmina Czersk, Pomeranian Voivodeship has just 2 people, although it is a part of Pustki.
