= Anneli Granget =

German actress

- Born: 11 August 1935; Königsberg, East Prussia
- Died: 25 April 1971 (aged 35)
- Occupation: Actress
- Spouse: Hannes Riesenberger

Anneli Granget (11 August 1935 – 25 April 1971) was a German stage and television actress.

She began her career in the late 1950s and gained public recognition with her role in the TV movie Am grünen Strand der Spree and went on to play leading roles in productions such as Jeder stirbt für sich allein and Hafenkrankenhaus. Granget was married to actor Hannes Riesenberger and had one son. Struggling with depression, she took her life in 1971.

== Career ==
Anneli Granget was born in Königsberg, East Prussia. She began her film and stage career at the end of the 1950s. For eight years, she was a member of the Nuremberg Ensemble; after 1970, she appeared there as a guest. She performed as a guest at the Nuremberg Playhouse at the Staatstheater Nürnberg, the Ruhrfestspiele in Recklinghausen and others.

Her first role on television was Svanhild Magnussen in the five-part television movie Am grünen Strand der Spree and brought her name to the public's attention. Afterward, she primarily played leading roles, such as the role of "Trudel Baumann" in Hans Fallada's Jeder stirbt für sich allein in 1962, directed by Falk Harnack and starring Edith Schultze-Westrum and Alfred Schieske. In 1968, she played "Nurse Inge" (German: Schwester Inge) in the 13-part television miniseries, Hafenkrankenhaus. Her last television role was in 1970 in Gerhart Hauptmann's drama, Vor Sonnenuntergang, with Werner Hinz and Cordula Trantow.

== Personal life ==
Granget was married to actor Hannes Riesenberger, with whom she shared the stage several times. They had one son. Suffering from depression, she took her life on 25 April 1971.

== Filmography ==
- Am grünen Strand der Spree (1960, TV Mini-Series) as Svanhild Magnussen
- Eine etwas sonderbare Dame (1960, TV Movie) (with Brigitte Horney) as Florence
- Unseliger Sommer (1961, TV Movie) (with Ullrich Haupt) as Peggy
- Anfrage (1962, TV Movie, directed by Egon Monk) as Sekretärin
- Nachruf auf Jürgen Trahnke (1962, TV Movie, directed by Rolf Hädrich) (with Ernst Jacobi) as Bärbel
- Jeder stirbt für sich allein (1962, TV Movie, directed by Falk Harnack) as Trudel Baumann
- Der Schatten (1963, TV Movie) as Annunziata
- Die Gerechten (1964, TV Movie) (with Christoph Bantzer) as Dora Dulkebow
- Briefe der Liebe (1964, TV Series)
- Zeitvertreib (1964, TV Movie) as Karin
- Ankunft bei Nacht (Verwehte Spuren) (1965, TV Movie) as Igna Vargas
- Im Jahre Neun (1966, TV Movie) (with Gerd Baltus and Hans Söhnker) as Asta-Vertreterin / Nelda
- Liebesgeschichten (1967, TV Series) as Louise Dowd / Anne Thornton
- Hafenkrankenhaus (1968) (with Rolf Schimpf) as Schwester Inge
- Der Punkt »M« (1969, TV Movie) as Elsa Reinfahl
- Vor Sonnenuntergang (1970, TV Movie) (with Werner Hinz, Cordula Trantow, Doris Schade) as Ottilie Klamroth (final film role)

== Audio plays ==
- Das Opfer von Treblinka - Die Geschichte des Kostek Wittkowsky (1958), with Erik Schumann and P. Walter Jacob
- Die ungleichen Brüder (1958), with Lina Carstens
- Geh nicht nach El Kuwehd (1960), by Günter Eich (Schirin), with Horst Sachtleben
- Um Mitternacht (1960), with Arnold Marquis
- Gottes liebe Kinder (1961)
- Die beiden Tabakspfeifen (Die Motte) (1961), with Walter Richter and Angelika Hurwicz
- Die ganze Wahrheit und nichts als die Wahrheit (1966), with Erik Schumann
- Anna und Wassilij (1968)
