= Anti-Fascist Committee for a Free Germany =

- German: Antifaschistisches Komitee Freies Deutschland
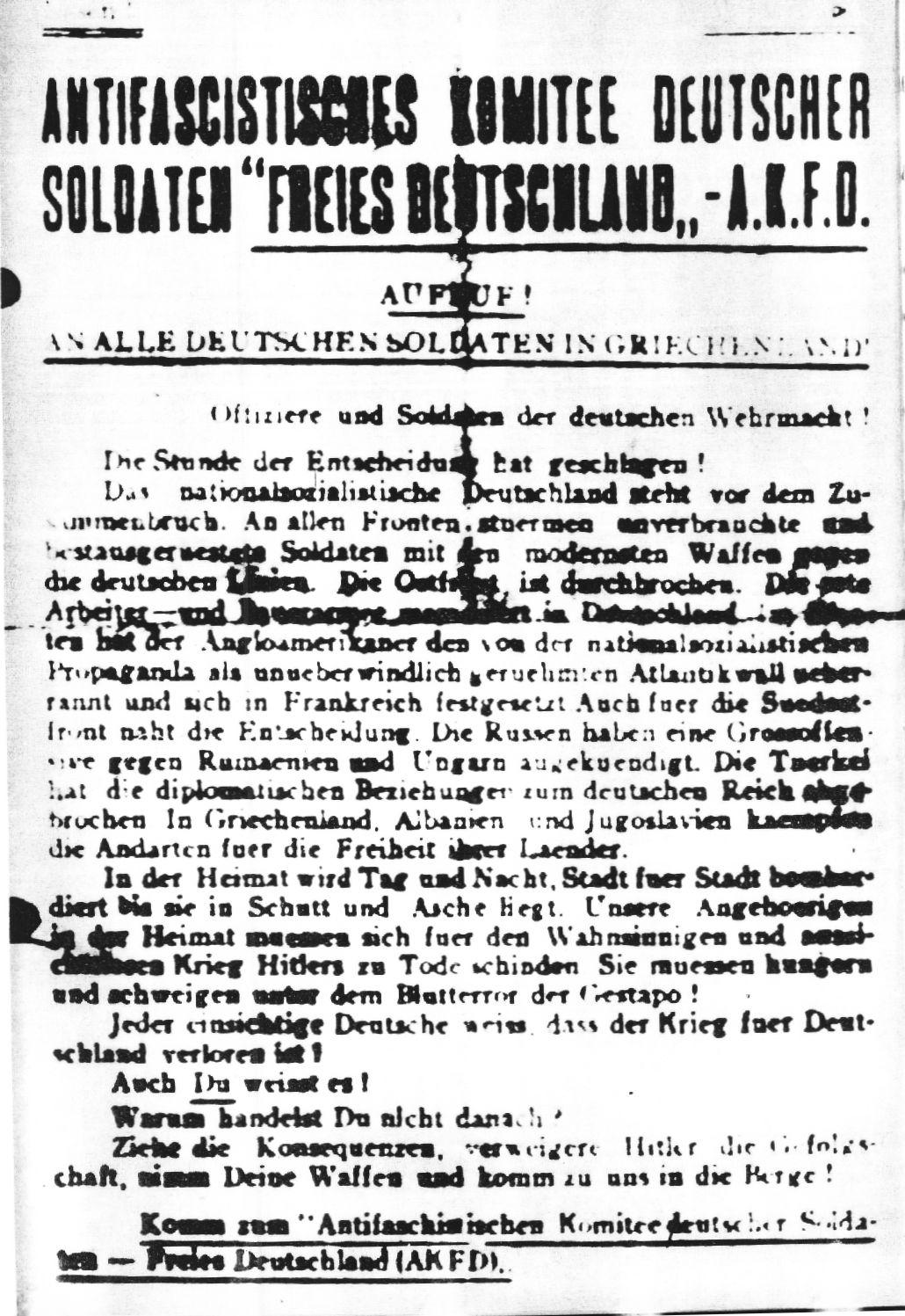
- Leaders: Falk Harnack; Gerhard Reinhardt
- Dates active: August-December 1944
- Country: (Greece) Hellenic State
- Allegiance: ELAS
- Ideology: Anti-fascism
- Part of: German resistance to Nazism; Movement for a Free Germany; Greek resistance

The Anti-Fascist Committee for a Free Germany (German: Antifaschistisches Komitee Freies Deutschland, or AKFD) was an organization of former Wehrmacht soldiers modeled after the National Committee for a Free Germany. The organization was formed in German-occupied Greece during the last months of the German occupation of the country and lasted from August to December 1944. Falk Harnack and Gerhard Reinhardt were two of its co-founders.

== Historical background ==
During the period of the Axis occupation of Greece (1941-44) a large number of German anti-fascist soldiers defected from the ranks of the German armed forces (Wehrmacht) and joined the Greek partisans of the Greek People's Liberation Army (ELAS). ELAS was the military wing of the left-wing National Liberation Front (EAM). Defections accelerated from the summer of 1943 onwards, as military units belonging to the penal 999th Light Afrika Division were transferred to Greece.

Initially the German anti-fascists were directly integrated into ELAS divisions and were not organized in special, independent, German partisan units. Soon, however, inspired by the creation of the National Committee for a Free Germany (NKFD) by anti-fascist German soldiers and officers in the Eastern Front, plans were made to set up a similar committee in Greece. Another similar Committee, the "Free Germany Committee for the West" (KFDW), was created by sympathizers with the resistance from among German soldiers, prisoners of war, defectors and emigrants on the Western front.

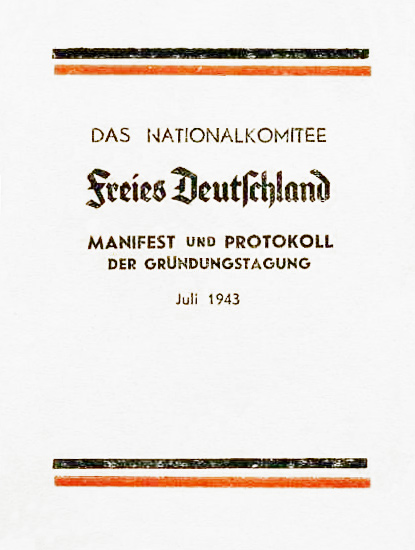
Official manifesto of the NKFD, the organization that inspired the creation of the AKFD

== Forming ==
Two persons were central in the creation of the AKFD (Anti-Fascist Committee for a Free Germany) in Greece.

- Falk Harnack, who had been working directly at the ELAS headquarters in Kastania, Trikala (municipality of Kalambaka) since early 1944.
- Gerhard Reinhardt, who wrote the German-language call for the founding of the Anti-fascist Committee for a Free Germany (AKFD) in the EAM newspaper Eleftheri Ellada (Ελεύθερη Ελλάδα) in 1944.

In late July 1944, after discussions with a Soviet military mission, there was a meeting in ELAS headquarters in Kastania, Trikala, between the ELAS High Command, Falk Harnack and Gerhard Reinhardt. The meeting was attended by the ELAS commander, Stefanos Sarafis; the ELAS legal advisor, Konstantinos Despotopoulos; and EAM's Minister of Culture Petros Kokkalis.

The formal forming of the AKFD took place on August 10, 1944, as a German-language "Appeal to all German soldiers in Greece" was published in the EAM newspaper Eleftheri Ellada (Ελεύθερη Ελλάδα) to actively fight against Hitler's Wehrmacht. The AKFD was recognized by telegram from the management of the NKFD in Moscow. From late August, radio broadcasts from the NKFD from Moscow were also regularly listened to at the EAM-ELAS headquarters.

== Structure ==
The AKFD was headed by the central committee, consisting of the political director, Falk Harnack, Gerhard Reinhardt, who was responsible for organizational matters, and other members (Willi Schrade, Paul Fritz, Erich Klose, Hans Schüller, Franz Oberweger, Wilhelm Hansen, Robert Hermann, Rudolf Schiller and others), mostly defectors from the XXI Fortress Infantry Battalion of the penal 999th Light Afrika Division, who later became commanders of the company units (Hundertschaft) that were formed. They were to be made up of the German soldiers already fighting at ELAS and were to be further strengthened by prisoners of war and defectors of Wehrmacht who had been converted to the cause by propaganda. The company units were to be assigned to an ELAS regiment or division, organised in groups of 30 men, which were in turn to be divided into cells of 10 men.

From 14 August 1944, three instructors (Falk Harnack, Gerhard Reinhardt and Kurt Adam) set out to organize the German anti-fascist defectors in Greece in different AKFD units along various geographical areas of Greece:

Falk Harnack, who used the alias "Ikarus", operated in the areas of the central highlands and towards the west coast of Greece, close to the borders with Albania. Harnack organised the following units:

- Rumeli Company (Hundertschaft Rumeli) directly under the command of ELAS headquarters
- Agrinion Company (Hundertschaft Agrinion) with 21 men with commander and political director Kurt Lohberger (formerly XXI Bat. 999) linked to the 34th and 42nd ELAS regiments

Gerhard Reinhardt operated in the northeast areas of Greece, areas close to the city of Volos and towards Thessaloniki and remained close to the 13th ELAS division. Reinhardt organised the following units:

- Volos Company (Hundertschaft Volos) with 51 men, then until October 1944 about 90 men, command Willi Schrade (formerly XXI Bat. 999) with the 54th ELAS regiment.
- Larisa Company (Hundertschaft Larisa) with 38 men, under the command of Erich Klose (formerly XXI Bat. 999)
- Saloniki Company (Hundertschaft Saloniki) with about 30 men (formerly 999 and other defectors) since Sept./Oct. 1944 at the 11th ELAS division; this company was formerly known as "German Antifascist Committee of Macedonia, Free Germany"

Kurt Adam was to travel to the Peloponnese in Tropaia, Arcadia, to work with the 3rd ELAS division in order to organize approximately 60 German anti-fascists in AKFD companies in the south parts of Greece, in Peloponnese, in late August 1944. However, according to Falk Harnack, Kurt Adam defected to British units on his journey.

== Literature ==
- Hans Burkhardt, Günter Erxleben, Kurt Nettball: Die mit dem blauen Schein. Über den antifaschistischen Widerstand in den 999er Formationen der faschistischen deutschen Wehrmacht (1942 bis 1945). Militärverlag der Deutschen Demokratischen Republik, Berlin 1982.
- Gottfried Hamacher unter Mitarbeit von André Lohmar, Herbert Mayer, Günter Wehner und Harald Wittstock: Gegen Hitler. Deutsche in der Résistance, in den Streitkräften der Antihitlerkoalition und der Bewegung „Freies Deutschland“. Kurzbiografien (= Manuskripte/Rosa-Luxemburg-Stiftung. Bd. 53). 2. korrigierte Auflage. Karl Dietz, Berlin 2005, ISBN 3-320-02941-X (Digitalisat (PDF; 873 KB)).
- Heinz Kühnrich, Franz-Karl Hitze: Deutsche bei Titos Partisanen 1941–1945. Kriegsschicksale auf dem Balkan in Augenzeugenberichten und Dokumenten. GNN-Verlag, Schkeuditz 1997, ISBN 3-929994-83-6.
- Wolfgang Schumann, Gerhart Hass, Walter Bartel, Karl Drechsler: Deutschland im Zweiten Weltkrieg. Band 6: Die Zerschlagung des Hitlerfaschismus und die Befreiung des deutschen Volkes (Juni 1944 bis zum 8. Mai 1945). Pahl-Rugenstein, Köln 1985, ISBN 3-7609-0574-9.
- Strafdivision 999. Erlebnisse und Berichte aus dem antifaschistischen Widerstandskampf. Deutscher Militärverlag, Berlin 1965.
