= Przejęsław =

- Village
- Location within Poland
- Coordinates: 51°22′N 15°25′E
- Country: Poland
- Voivodeship: Lower Silesian
- County: Bolesławiec
- Gmina: Osiecznica

Przejęsław [pʂɛˈjɛ̃swaf] is a village in the administrative district of Gmina Osiecznica, within Bolesławiec County, Lower Silesian Voivodeship, in south-western Poland.
