= Osiecznica, Lower Silesian Voivodeship =

Osiecznica
- Village
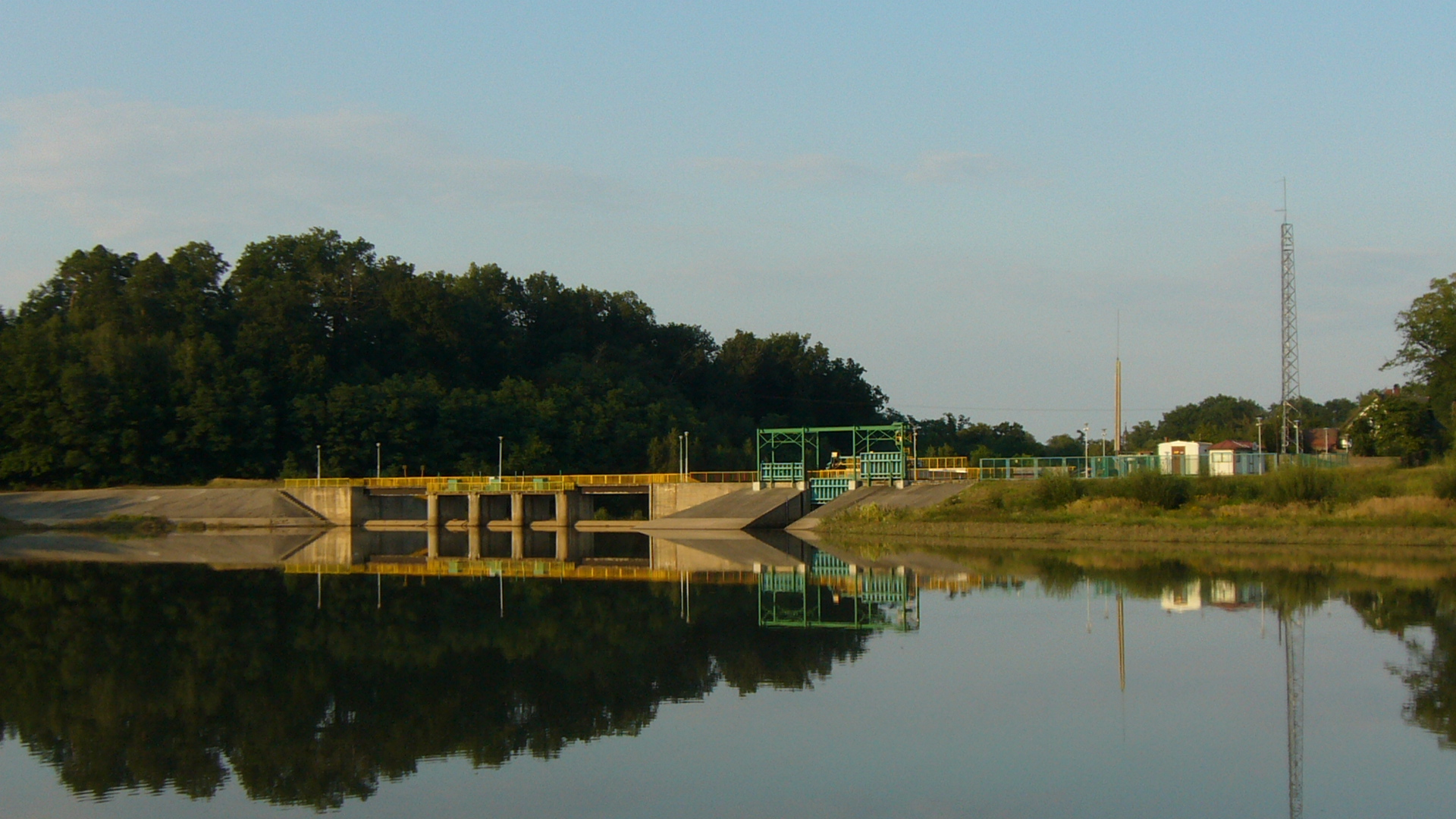
- Hydroelectric plant

- Coat of arms

- Location within Poland
- Coordinates: 51°19′39″N 15°25′10″E
- Country: Poland
- Voivodeship: Lower Silesian
- County: Bolesławiec
- Gmina: Osiecznica

Population
  - Total: 1,000

Osiecznica (Polish pronunciation: [ɔɕɛt͡ʂˈnit͡sa]) is a village in Bolesławiec County, Lower Silesian Voivodeship, in south-western Poland. It is the seat of the administrative district (gmina) called Gmina Osiecznica.

From 1975 to 1998 Osiecznica was in Jelenia Góra Voivodeship.

== Notable residents ==
- Abraham Gottlob Werner (1749–1817), German geologist
