= The Plot to Assassinate Hitler =

1955 film

The Plot to Assassinate Hitler (German: Der 20. Juli) is a 1955 West German feature film produced by CCC Film about the failed 20 July 1944 attempt to assassinate Adolf Hitler. Falk Harnack directed and co-wrote the film's script with Günther Weisenborn. Wolfgang Preiss won the German Federal Film Award for his role as the rebel army officer, Claus von Stauffenberg. The film has a realism that comes very close to the style of a documentary.

The Plot to Assassinate Hitler was released in the same year as G.W. Pabst's film, Es geschah am 20. Juli, (English title, Jackboot Mutiny), which deals with the same subject.

== Reviews ==
Lexicon of international film: A film that was carefully cast down to the smallest role and advised in detail by members of the resistance, which attracted positive attention in German cinema in the 1950s.

== Awards ==
The FBL awarded the film the title valuable.

The screenwriters Günther Weisenborn and Werner Jörg Lüddecke received the Federal Film Prize in silver in 1956.

Wolfgang Preiss also received the Federal Film Prize in silver in 1956 for his portrayal.

Producer Artur Brauner received the film award for the "feature film that makes a particularly lasting contribution to awakening civic awareness".

The film was recommended by the Evangelical Film Guild as “best film of the month” (July 1955).
