= Ołobok, Lower Silesian Voivodeship =

Ołobok
- Village
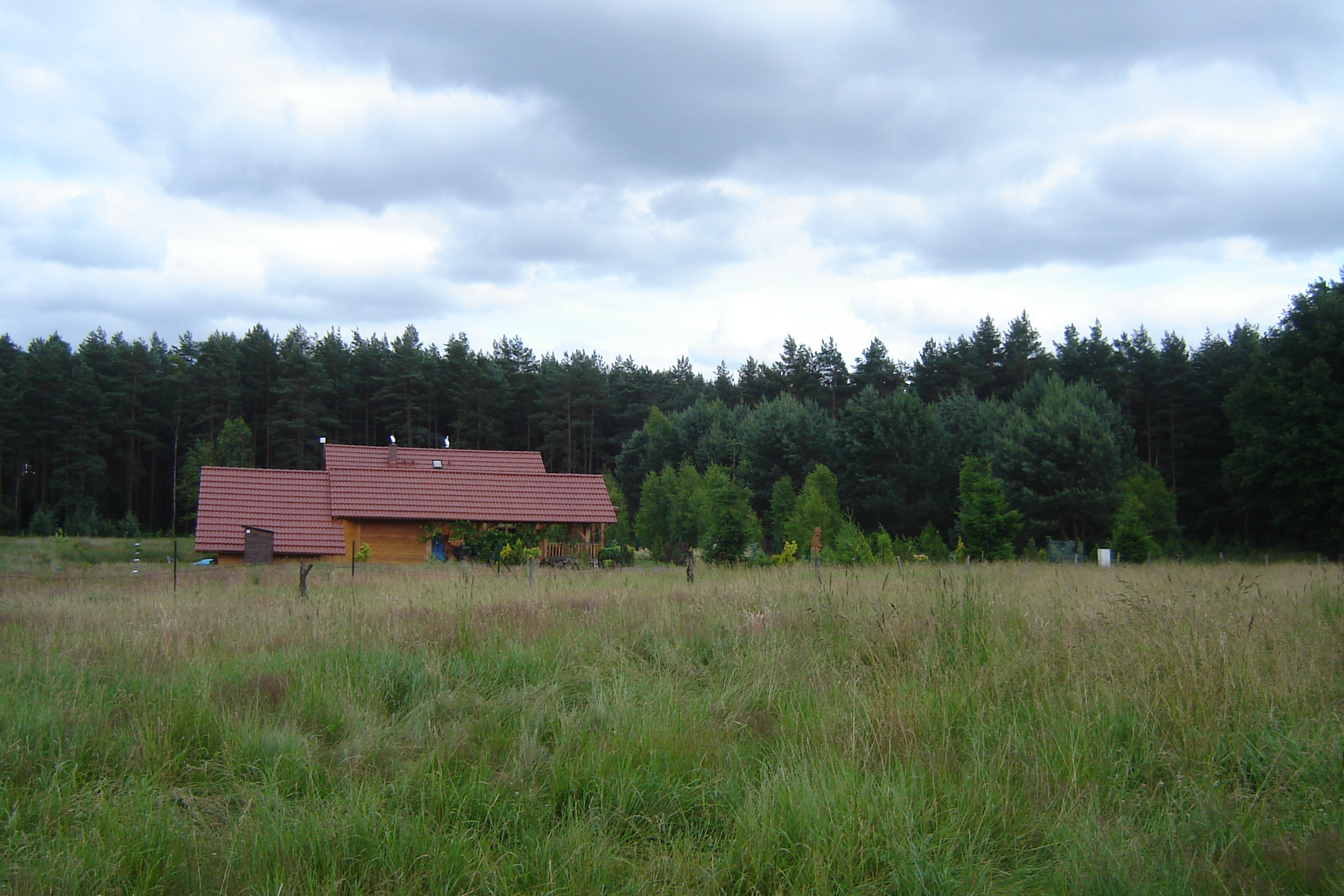

- Location within Poland
- Coordinates: 51°20′20″N 15°17′22″E
- Country: Poland
- Voivodeship: Lower Silesian
- County: Bolesławiec
- Gmina: Osiecznica
- Time zone: UTC+1 (CET)
  - Summer (DST): UTC+2 (CEST)
- Postal code: 59-724
- Vehicle registration: DBL

Ołobok [ɔˈwɔbɔk] is a village in the administrative district of Gmina Osiecznica, within Bolesławiec County, Lower Silesian Voivodeship, in south-western Poland.

Anti-Nazi activist Otto Hampel was born here.
