= Poświętne, Lower Silesian Voivodeship =

Poświętne
- Village
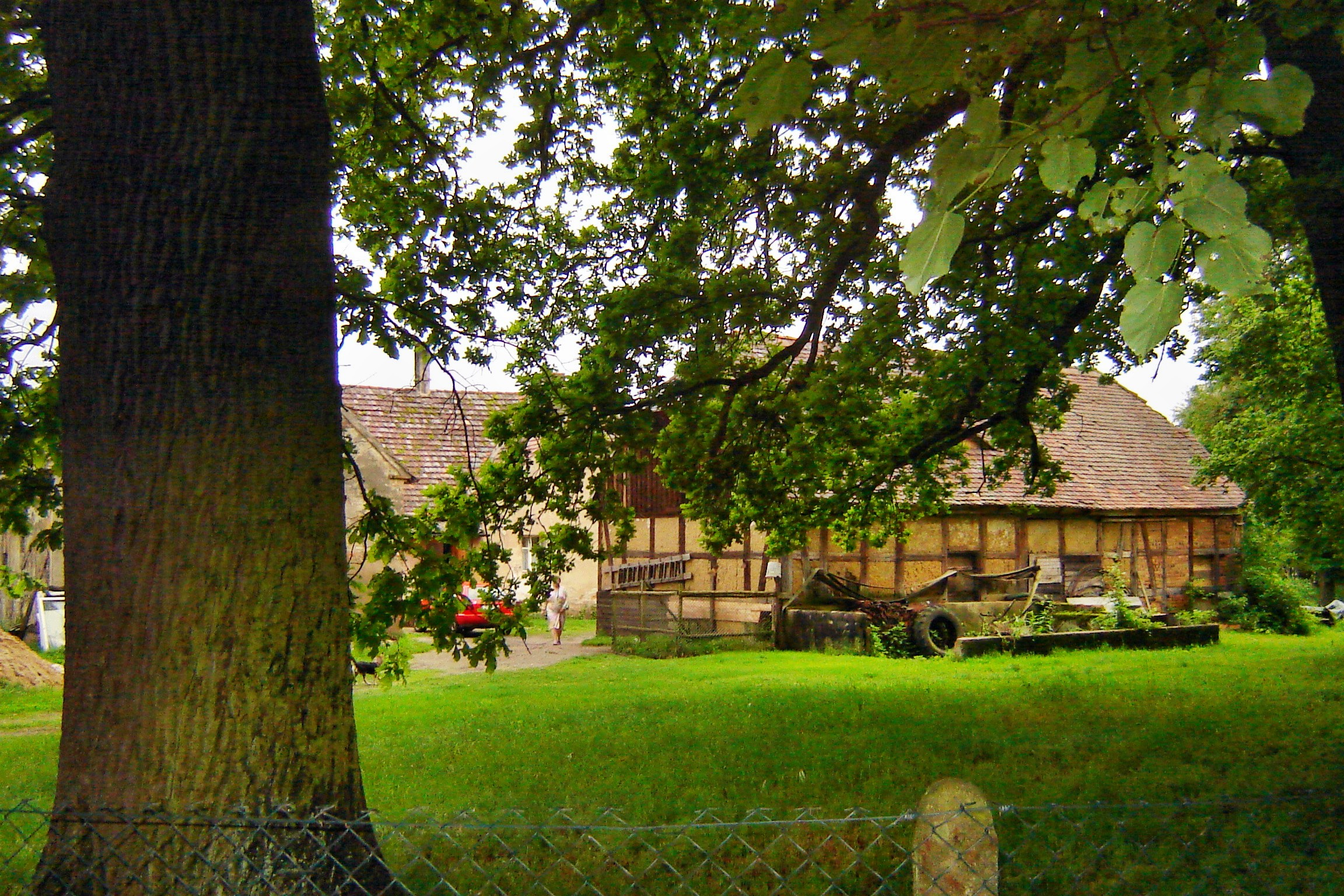

- Location within Poland
- Coordinates: 51°24′N 15°18′E
- Country: Poland
- Voivodeship: Lower Silesian
- County: Bolesławiec
- Gmina: Osiecznica

Poświętne [pɔɕˈfjɛntnɛ] is a village in the administrative district of Gmina Osiecznica, within Bolesławiec County, Lower Silesian Voivodeship, in south-western Poland.
