= Jeder stirbt für sich allein (1962 film) =

1962 film by Falk Harnack

- Courtroom scene
- Based on: Every Man Dies Alone by Hans Fallada
- Screenplay by: Robert A. Stemmle; Falk Harnack
- Directed by: Falk Harnack
- Starring: Alfred Schieske; Edith Schultze-Westrum
- Music by: Peter Sandloff
- Country of origin: Germany
- Original language: German

Production
- Cinematography: Heinz Pehlke
- Running time: 100 minutes
- Production company: Sender Freies Berlin

Original release
- Release: 19 July 1962

Jeder stirbt für sich allein (Everyone Dies Alone) is a 1962 West German made for television political drama film based on a best-selling 1947 novel by Hans Fallada, itself based on the true story of a working class couple, Otto and Elise Hampel, who committed acts of civil disobedience against the government of Nazi Germany and were executed. Directed by former German Resistance member Falk Harnack—whose brother, sister-in-law and cousins were executed during the Nazi regime—it was the first screen adaptation of Fallada's novel.

== Background ==
The teleplay was adapted by Robert A. Stemmle from the Hans Fallada novel Every Man Dies Alone. Though written in 1947, it was virtually unknown to the English-speaking world until it was translated into English in 2009. The German edition achieved early success, spawning translations into Russian, Polish, Romanian, Czech, Norwegian, French, and Italian. The 2009 English version soon became a bestseller in both England and the United States, bringing more international success and translations into Hebrew and Dutch.

In addition to the 1962 teleplay, there have been three subsequent screen adaptations of Fallada's novel: a television miniseries entitled Jeder stirbt für sich allein broadcast in East Germany in 1970; a feature film in 1975, released in English in 1976 as Everyone Dies Alone; and a television miniseries in the Czech Republic in 2004.

The 1962 teleplay, the first screen adaptation of Fallada's book, was directed by Falk Harnack, who had been active in the German Resistance against the Nazism and the Third Reich. His own arrest and trial led to acquittal, but several members of his family and many friends were arrested and executed, including his brother, Arvid and his sister-in-law, Mildred Harnack, a translator and professor of literature, who had visited Fallada in 1934.

== Broadcast and synopsis ==
The 1962 teleplay aired on station Sender Freies Berlin (SFB), then an affiliate of German broadcaster ARD. It tells of an ordinary couple who began to resist the Nazis after their only son was killed in World War II. The television film was broadcast the evening of 19 July, the day before the 18th anniversary of the 20 July 1944 attempt on Adolf Hitler's life.

In wartime Berlin, a factory foreman, Otto Quangel and his wife, Anna learn that their only son, Paul, has been killed in action in France. In their grief, the couple decide to take action against the Nazi regime. They create their own form of resistance, writing postcards urging people to resist Hitler and the Nazis and quietly distributing the postcards around Berlin. Various people enter the picture, showing the fear and distrust of the times. People, such as the actor Harteisen, find the cards and race to turn them in, lest they be found with them and come under suspicion. The police and the Gestapo are baffled for over a year, but finally find the source of the cards. The Volksgerichtshof sentences the Quangels to death.

The television listing for the broadcast read, "An impressive teleplay, this will be broadcast on the eve of 20 July to commemorate the many unknown fighters against Nazi terror, in memory of the people who were pursued by the Gestapo and executed by an inexorable judiciary."

== Cast ==
- Alfred Schieske as Otto Quangel
- Edith Schultze-Westrum as Anna Quangel
- Anneli Granget as Trudel Baumann
- Hartmut Reck as Karl Hergesell
- Friedrich Siemers as Franz Grigoleit
- Harry Riebauer as Dr. Sommer
- Martin Hirthe as SS Brigadeführer Prall
- Werner Peters as Kriminalkommissar Escherich
- Benno Hoffmann as Assistant Kriminalkommissar Schröder
- Hugo Schrader as Enno Kluge
- Erich Gühne as Volunteer policeman Persicke
- Friedrich Schoenfelder as Harteisen, actor
- Rudolf Fernau as Dr. Toll, lawyer
- Theodor Vogeler as Dr. Menz, doctor
- Reinhold Bernt as Police station superintendent
- Klaus Miedel as Judge-President of the Volksgerichtshof
- Paul Albert Krumm as "Stranger"
- Reinhard Kolldehoff as SA man
- Hilde Sessak as Frau Gesch
- Ethel Reschke as Pub owner

== See also ==
- List of Germans who resisted Nazism
