= Jeder stirbt für sich allein (1970 miniseries) =

- Part 2: Else Grube-Deister (Anna Quangel) and Erwin Geschonneck (Otto Quangel)
- Genre: Political drama
- Based on: Every Man Dies Alone by Hans Fallada
- Screenplay by: Klaus Jörn; Hans-Joachim Kasprzik
- Directed by: Hans-Joachim Kasprzik
- Starring: Erwin Geschonneck
- Theme music composer: Günter Hauk
- Country of origin: East Germany
- Original language: German
- No. of episodes: 3

Production
- Producer: Adolf Fischer
- Cinematography: Lothar Gerber
- Running time: 314 minutes (total)
- Production company: DEFA

Original release
- Release: September 12 – September 20, 1970

Jeder stirbt für sich allein (1970) is a German television miniseries produced by DEFA in the former German Democratic Republic. The story was adapted from the 1947 Hans Fallada novel, Every Man Dies Alone, known in the UK as Alone in Berlin. It was directed by Hans-Joachim Kasprzik and starred Erwin Geschonneck.

== Background ==
The three-part miniseries was directed by Hans-Joachim Kasprzik, who also co-wrote the screenplay. It stars Erwin Geschonneck and Else Grube-Deister as Otto and Anna Quangel. It is based on a true story, that of Otto and Elise Hampel, a working class couple in wartime Berlin who began a postcard campaign to resist the Nazis and the Third Reich and were arrested, tried before the Volksgerichtshof and executed at Plötzensee Prison.

== Synopsis ==
The story takes place in Berlin in 1940, where Otto Quangel is a toolmaker at a factory. His wife, Anna, is a homemaker. Though their son is fighting on the front, they are apolitical and Otto is not a member of any political party. Otto and Anna learn that their son has fallen "like a hero" in France and are devastated. In addition, a Jewish neighbor meets a violent death. In his grief and horror, Otto becomes politicized and decides to take action against the Nazis, hoping to foment a mass rebellion against Hitler. Though nothing comes of their efforts, the Quangels remain proud of what they've done; it enabled them to retain their faith in humanity. They are arrested, separated, tried, sentenced and executed.

== Reception ==
The kabel eins film lexicon calls the miniseries, "A star-studded, evocative, solid film that centers on the anti-fascist resistance struggle of a working class couple."

== Cast (partial list) ==
- Erwin Geschonneck as Otto Quangel
- Else Grube-Deister as Anna Quangel
- Wolfgang Kieling as Kommissar Escherich
- Dieter Franke as Gruppenführer Prall
- Fred Düren as Emil Borkhausen
- Fred Delmare as Enno Kluge
- Helga Göring as Eva Kluge
- Erika Dunkelmann as Hete Häberle
- Heinz Scholz as "der alte" Persicke
- Traudi Harprecht

== See also ==
- Jeder stirbt für sich allein (1962, West Germany), the first screen adaptation of Fallada's book, produced in West Germany
- Everyone Dies Alone (1975, West Germany), the first cinematic version of Fallada's book
- List of Germans who resisted Nazism
