= Hans-Joachim Kasprzik =

German director and screenwriter

Hans-Joachim Kasprzik (14 August 1928 – 10 October 1997) was a German film and television director and screenwriter. He worked with DEFA and Deutscher Fernsehfunk in East Germany.

== Career ==
Hans-Joachim Kasprzik was born in Beuthen. After the war, he attended a training programrun by the newly created DEFA in the Soviet occupation zone. He then began his career there in the 1950s, first working as an assistant for several important directors, such as Kurt Maetzig, Konrad Wolf, Hans Müller and Kurt Jung-Alsen. He worked under Müller on the 1954 film, Carola Lamberti – Eine vom Zirkus, under Jung-Alsen on Duped Till Doomsday (1957) and under Maetzig on First Spaceship on Venus (1960). His directorial debut was with the television film Gerichtet bei Nacht in 1960, which he also wrote. He also directed television miniseries, often writing the screen adaptations as well, such as with Hans Fallada's Wolf unter Wölfen in 1964. In 1965, the West German magazine Film wrote that Kasprzik could become one of the GDR's best film directors.

In 1966, Kasprzik directed the comedy Hände hoch oder ich schieße ("Hands up, or I shoot") with Rolf Herricht, a film that was banned by the Communists and not released. The film was restored by the DEFA Foundation (German: DEFA Stiftung) and the Bundesarchiv-Filmarchiv in 2009 and was the last in a series of banned films restored and released by the Foundation.

Kasprzik co-wrote the screenplay for Jeder stirbt für sich allein from Fallada's book, Every Man Dies Alone, and was broadcast in three parts in September 1970. He also directed Die Brüder Lautensack in 1973, Abschied vom Frieden in 1979 and Bahnwärter Thiel in 1982. He was best known as director of the miniseries Sachsens Glanz und Preußens Gloria in 1983 and 1984, in which his daughter appeared.

== Personal ==
Kasprzik was married to a photographer, Jutta Kasprzik, and his daughter is the actress Anne Kasprik.

== Filmography (selected) ==
- Gewissen in Aufruhr (1961)
- Wolf unter Wölfen (1965)
- Hände hoch oder ich schieße (1966), restored in 2009
- Kleiner Mann – was nun? (1967)
- Jeder stirbt für sich allein (1970)
- Die Brüder Lautensack (1972)
- Abschied vom Frieden (1977)
- Bahnwärter Thiel (1982)
- Sachsens Glanz und Preußens Gloria (1983–1984)
- Gräfin Cosel (1987)
- Polizeiruf 110, "Der Wahrheit verpflichtet" (1989)
