= Every Man Dies Alone =

1947 novel by Hans Fallada

- One of earliest German editions, 1948
- Author: Hans Fallada
- Translator: Michael Hofmann
- Language: German
- Genre: Fiction
- Publisher: Melville House Publishing
- Publication date: 1947
- Publication place: West Germany
- English publication date: 2009
- ISBN: 978-1-935554-04-2

Every Man Dies Alone or Alone in Berlin (German: Jeder stirbt für sich allein) is a 1947 novel by German author Hans Fallada. It is based on the true story of working-class husband and wife Otto and Elise Hampel who, acting alone, became part of the German Resistance. Fallada's book was one of the first anti-Nazi novels to be published by a German after World War II.

== Background ==
Otto and Elise Hampel, a working class couple in Berlin, were not interested in politics, but after Elise Hampel learned that her brother had fallen in France, she and her husband began committing acts of civil disobedience. They began writing leaflets on postcards, urging people to resist and overthrow the Nazis. They wrote hundreds of them, leaving them in apartment stairwells and dropping them into mailboxes. Though they knew the law made this a capital crime, they continued this work for well over a year until they were betrayed and arrested. They were tried by Nazi judge Roland Freisler and executed in Plötzensee Prison.

The English translation contains reproductions of actual postcards handwritten by the Hampels in Sütterlin-like block letters in a clumsy hand. (Note: Sütterlin was the common German handwriting of the era.) The uneducated Hampels made spelling mistakes and their language was simple, but their message was strong—enough to terrify those who found the postcards. (Note: Dennis Johnson of Melville House said on Charlie Rose that the postcards were full of "grammatical mistakes", but they were actually spelling mistakes, as evidenced by the samples in the book. In the largely homogenous German society of that era, uneducated Germans didn't use bad grammar, they just constructed simpler sentences and may not have used correct spelling.) Nearly all of them were immediately turned in to police or the Gestapo.

Fallada was given the Hampels' Gestapo files by Johannes Becher, a poet, novelist and friend of Fallada's, who returned from exile after the war and became president of the cultural organization established by the Soviet military administration in the Soviet sector. In his job to create a new anti-fascist culture, he went through the Nazi files of executed Resistance fighters and then sought authors who would write these stories according to the new anti-fascist model. He gave the Hampels' files to Fallada in autumn 1945 in an effort to help him recover by giving him good subject matter for a book. Fallada, who had many personal problems, including morphine addiction, had been both institutionalized and incarcerated during the Nazi era after shooting a gun in the direction of his ex-wife during a dispute. He did not at first want to write the story, saying he had not fought back and had even cooperated with the Nazis. However, unlike many writers and intellectuals who fled Nazi Germany, Fallada had felt too attached to the German language and culture to leave, despite the fact that he was urged to flee and some of his books had been blacklisted by the Nazis, though he remained one of the most commercially successful authors of entertainment literature. As a result, he lived through all years of fear, distrust and danger in the daily life of wartime Berlin and the psychological aspect of the Hampels' story intrigued him. He also had an ear for the simple speech of the common worker. A year after receiving the files, in autumn 1946, Fallada wrote Every Man Dies Alone in just 24 days and died a few months later, weeks before the book was published.

== Synopsis ==
The story takes place during World War II in 1940 in Berlin. The book conveys the omnipresent fear and suspicion engulfing Germany at the time caused by the constant threat of arrest, imprisonment, torture and death. Even those not at risk of any of those punishments could be ostracized and unable to find work.

Escherich, a Gestapo inspector, must find the source of hundreds of postcards encouraging Germans to resist Adolf Hitler and the Nazis with personal messages such as “Mother! The Führer has murdered my son. Mother! The Führer will murder your sons too, he will not stop till he has brought sorrow to every home in the world.” Escherich is under pressure from Obergruppenführer Prall to arrest the source or find himself in dire straits.

Nearly all those who find the cards turn them in to the Gestapo immediately, terrified they themselves will be discovered having them. Eventually, Escherich finds the postcard writer and his wife, who turn out to be a quiet, working class couple, Otto and Anna Quangel. The Quangels' acts of civil disobedience were prompted by the loss of their only son, who has been killed in action. They are arrested and brought to trial at the Volksgerichtshof, the Nazi "People's Court", where Judge Freisler presides. The Quangels are sentenced to death; Otto is soon executed, but Anna dies during an Allied bombing raid, while still on death row.

== Reception ==
Three months after its 2009 English release it became a "surprise bestseller" in both the US and UK. It was listed on the official UK Top 50 for all UK publishers, a rare occurrence for such an old book. Hans Fallada's 80-year-old son, Ulrich Ditzen, a retired lawyer, told The Observer he was overwhelmed by the latest sales, "It's a phenomenon." The Economist described it as "a historical page-turner that trades the banality of evil for the stubborn persistence of good." Primo Levi said it is "the greatest book ever written about German resistance to the Nazis."

== Translations ==
The novel remained untranslated in English until 2009 when it was rediscovered by American publishing house Melville House Publishing and released in the US under the title Every Man Dies Alone, in a translation by Michael Hofmann. Melville House licensed it to Penguin Books in the UK, who used the title Alone in Berlin, following the French translation by André Vandevoorde in 1967, Seul dans Berlin. The US title is close to the original German title, which translates verbatim as "Everyone dies for himself alone".

The book was first translated in 1948 into Russian (Иностранная литература, Каждый умирает в одиночку, a second edition on the basis of the uncensored manuscript Один в Берлине 2017) and into Swedish (En mot alla, a second edition on the basis of the uncensored manuscript Ensam i Berlin 2012). Then followed publishing in Dutch (Kroonder, Ieder sterft in eenzaamheid) and Finnish (Mantere, Kukin kuolee itsekseen) in 1949, Polish (Wydawnictwo Ministerstwa Obrony Narodowej, Każdy umiera w samotności) in 1950, and Romanian (Editura pentru literatură și artă, Fiecare moare singur) in 1951. In 1954, it was translated into Czech by Kamila Jiroudková (Československý spisovatel, I ve smrti sami) and Norwegian (Aschehoug, Den veien du går alene); a second Norwegian translation (Dinamo forlag, Alle dør alene) came out in 2011. In 1975 an Albanian translation saw the light with the title changed into "We needed to fight differently" (Duhej te luftonim ndryshe, Shtepia Botuese Naim Frasheri). In 1995, the book was translated into Italian (Einaudi Editore, Ognuno muore solo). A second translation came out in France in 2002. In 2010, the Israeli edition (Penn Publishing, "לבד בברלין") and the second Dutch translation, (Cossee, Alleen in Berlijn) were published, both following the title of the French translation. The book was translated into Sinhalese by Gamini Viyangoda with a title similar to the English translation 'Everyone Dies Alone' (හැම මිනිහෙක් ම මැරෙන්නේ තනියෙන්).

== Screen adaptations ==
The earliest adaption was the West German television film Jeder stirbt für sich allein (1962) directed by Falk Harnack which aired on station SFB. In 1970, an East German television miniseries Jeder stirbt für sich allein was directed by Hans-Joachim Kasprzik and produced by DEFA. The West German film Jeder stirbt für sich allein was directed by Alfred Vohrer in 1975, released internationally in English as Everyone Dies Alone in 1976; and in 2004, it was produced as a three-part television miniseries in the Czech Republic.

In 2012, the film rights were acquired by Vincent Pérez and Stefan Arndt. The film adaptation Alone in Berlin was first screened at the Berlin Film Festival in February 2016. The film starred Emma Thompson as Anna Quangel, Brendan Gleeson as Otto Quangel, and Daniel Brühl as Escherich. The director was Vincent Pérez. The film received a score of 52 on the critical aggregator website Metacritic, indicating "mixed or average reviews".

== See also ==
- List of fiction set in Berlin
- Jeder stirbt für sich allein (1970), East German miniseries adapted from Fallada's book
- List of Germans who resisted Nazism
