= Langtry (surname) =

Langtry is an English surname of habitational origin which derives from three settlements in Devon, Oxfordshire, and Lancashire called Langtree, from the Old English lang, long ‘long’, ‘tall’ + treow ‘tree’.

Notable Langtrys include:

- Albert P. Langtry (1860–1939), Secretary of the Commonwealth of Massachusetts, U.S.A.
- Brian Langtry (born 1976), lacrosse player for the Colorado Mammoth and the Denver Outlaws
- Henry Langtry (1841–1892), English cavalry colonel
- Henry V.M. Langtry (1869–1935), British Army lieutenant-colonel
- James I. Langtry (1939–2021), government official and educator
- John Langtry (1834–1906), M.A., D.C.L., member of the Anglican Church in Canada
- Joe Langtry (1880–1951), Australian politician
- Joseph Langtry (1805–1862), Royal Navy captain
- Lillie Langtry (1853–1929), born Emilie Charlotte Le Breton, renowned British actress
  - Jeanne Marie Langtry Malcolm (1881–1964), illegitimate daughter of Lillie Langtry

== See also ==
- Langtry (disambiguation)
