= Harnack =

Harnack is the surname of a German family of intellectuals, artists, mathematicians, scientists, theologians and those in other fields. Several family members were executed by the Nazis during the last years of the Third Reich.

- Theodosius Harnack (1817–1889), German theologian

- Anna Harnack (1849–?)
- Adolf von Harnack (1851–1930), German liberal theologian and historian of religion

- Agnes von Zahn-Harnack (1884–1950), German writer and women's rights activist
- Ernst von Harnack (1888–1945), German anti-Nazi resistance fighter

- Gustav-Adolf von Harnack (1917–2010), German pediatrician

- Elisabet von Harnack (1892–1976), German social worker
- Axel von Harnack (1895–1974), German historian and philologist

- Carl Gustav Axel Harnack (1851–1888), German mathematician
- Erich Harnack, professor of pharmacology
- Otto Harnack, literature historian

- Clara Harnack, painter and wife of Otto

- Arvid Harnack (1901–1942), German anti-Nazi resistance fighter

- Mildred Harnack (1902–1943), American anti-Nazi resistance fighter, wife of Arvid

- Falk Harnack (1913–1991), German anti-Nazi resistance fighter, film and stage director, brother of Arvid Harnack

== Other uses ==
- Harnack's principle
