= Broad church =

Latitudarian churchmanship in Anglicanism, particularly in the Church of England

Broad church is a latitudinarian churchmanship in the Church of England in particular and Anglicanism in general, meaning that the church permits a broad range of opinion on various issues of Anglican doctrine.

In the American Episcopal Church, the term "broad church" historically denoted latitudinarian churchmanship and connoted theological liberalism and modernism, particularly in the years between 1874 and 1934.

== Church of England ==
After the terms high church and low church came to distinguish the tendency toward Anglo-Catholicism on the one hand and evangelicalism on the other, those Anglicans tolerant of multiple forms of conformity to ecclesiastical authority came to be referred to as "broad". The expression apparently originated with A. H. Clough and was current in the later part of the 19th century for Anglicans who objected to positive definitions in theology and sought to interpret Anglican formularies in a broad and liberal sense. Characteristic members of this group were the contributors to Essays and Reviews, 1860, and A. P. Stanley. As the name implies, parishes associated with this variety of churchmanship will mix high and low forms, reflective of the often eclectic liturgical and doctrinal preferences of clergy and laity. The emphasis is on allowing individual parishioners' choice.

Broad church as an expression is now increasingly replaced by references in the Church of England to liberalism. For example, Rowan Williams, former archbishop of Canterbury, in his "text of reflection" The Challenge and Hope of Being an Anglican Today, released in 2006, described the three "components in our heritage" as "strict evangelical Protestantism", "Roman Catholicism" and "religious liberalism", accepting that "each of these has a place in the church's life". These would broadly correspond to the low church, high church and broad church parties in the Church of England.

It has been suggested that "broad" tended to be used to describe those of middle of the road liturgical preferences who leaned theologically towards liberal Protestantism; whilst "central" described those who were theologically conservative, and took the middle way in terms of liturgical practices, following the rubrics of the Prayer Book closely. Broad churchmen might best be described as those who are generally liberal in theology, sometimes culturally conservative, but also supportive of a broad—that is, comprehensive—Anglican Church including both Charismatic and Evangelical Low Church Anglicans, moderately high "Central Church Anglicans", liberal or "progressive" Anglicans, and Anglo-Catholic Anglicans (though not puritan on the one extreme nor papists on the other). It is not always possible to draw sharp lines between some of these traditions.

== Episcopal Church (United States) ==
According to Bishop Thomas J. Brown, the term "broad church" is not commonly used today, but "was common throughout much of the 20th century."

=== Historical connotations of liberalism ===
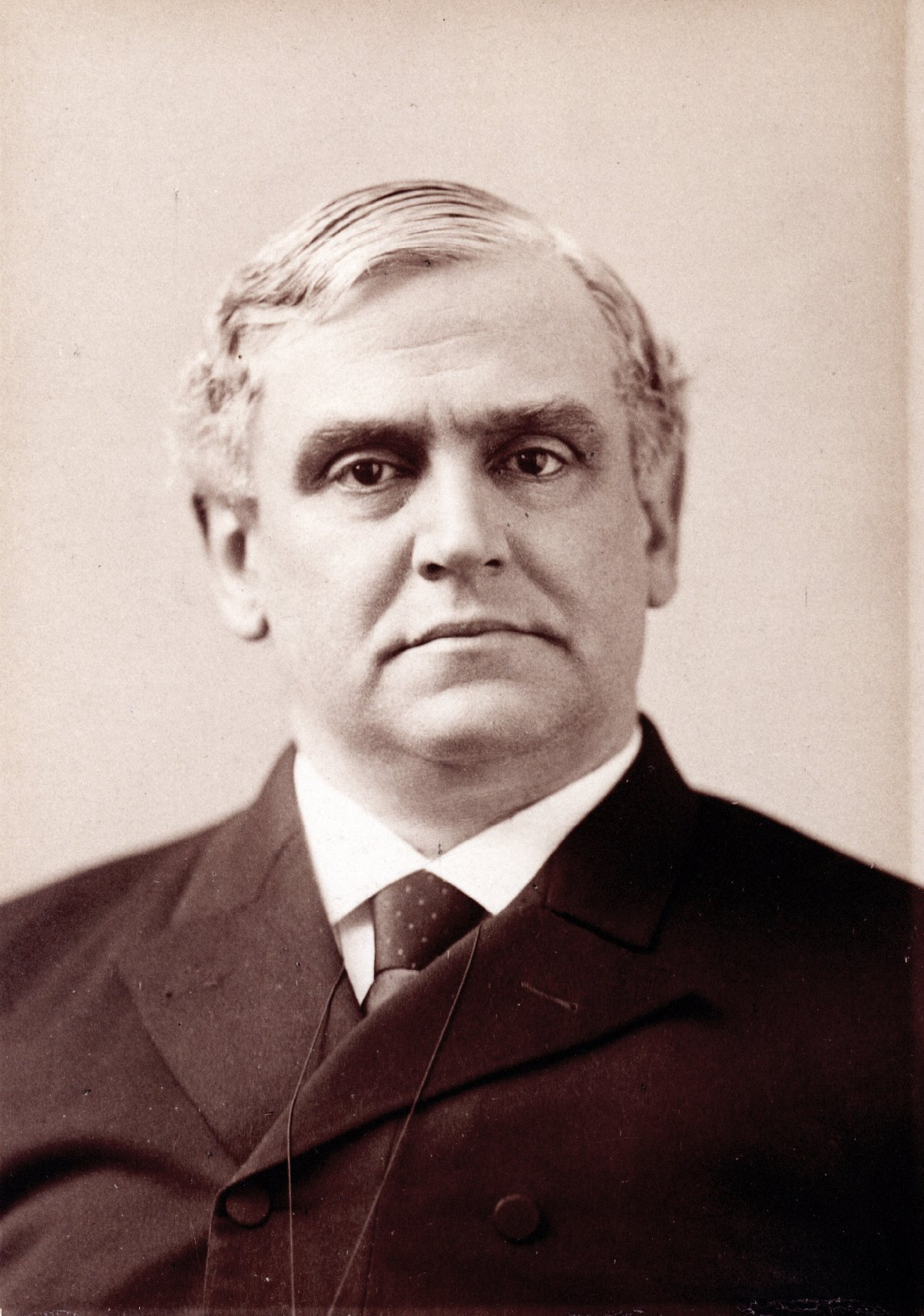
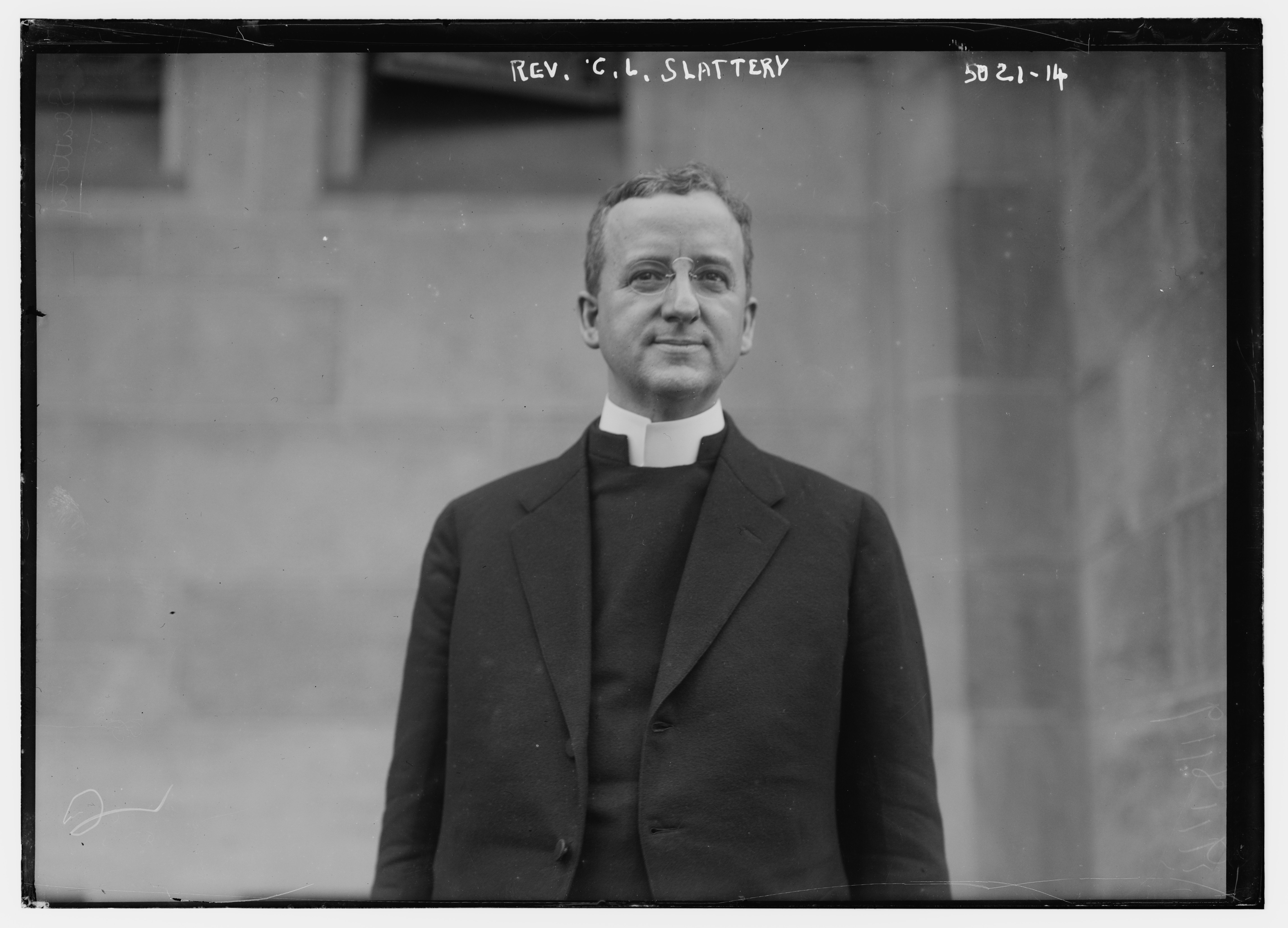
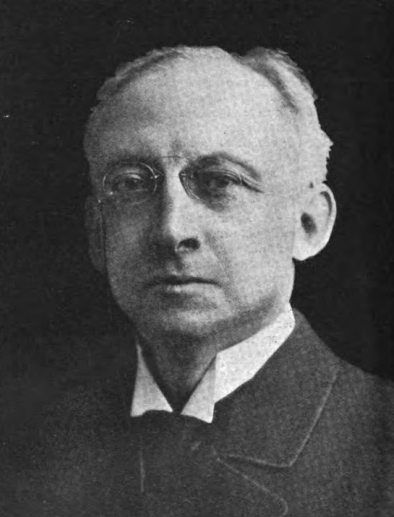
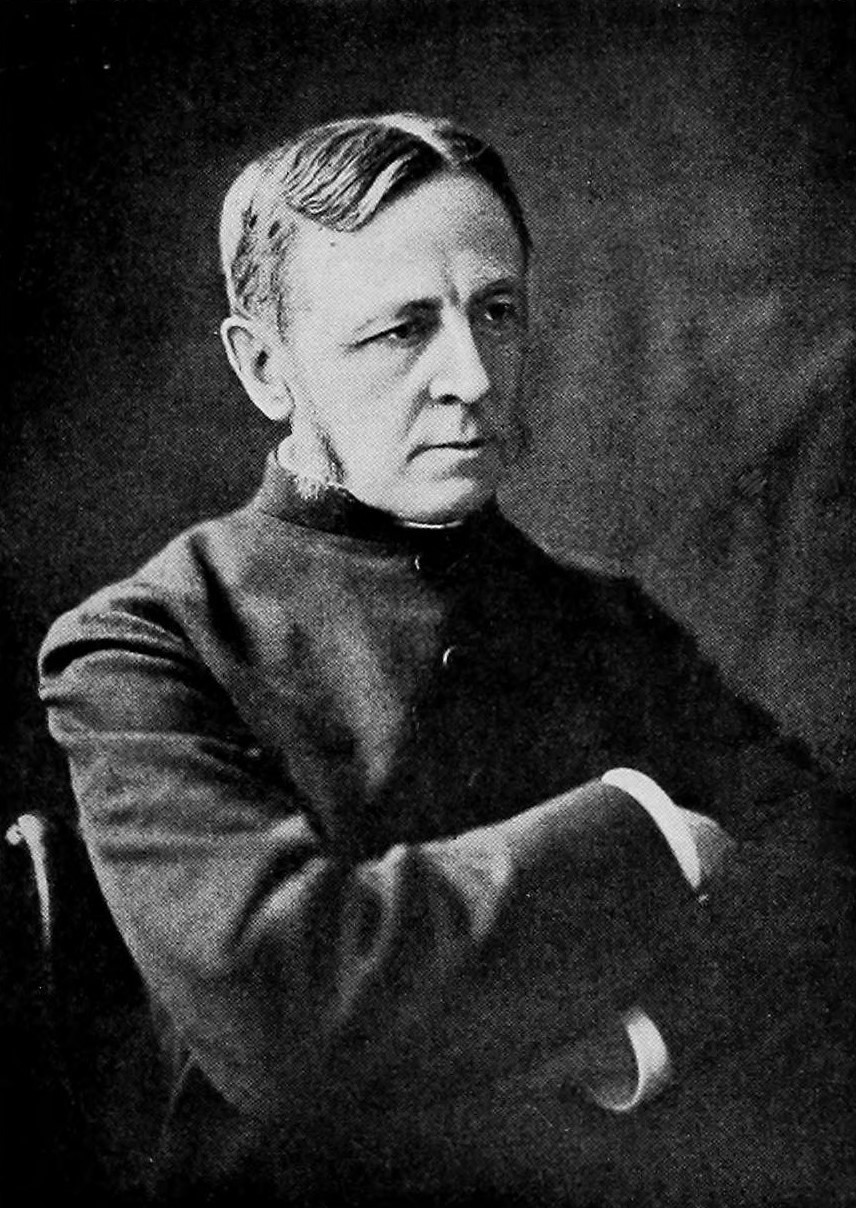
Broad Church preachers attracted large, affluent congregations in urban areas.
Clockwise from top left: Phillips Brooks, rector of Trinity Church in Boston; Charles Lewis Slattery, rector of Grace Church in New York; William Reed Huntington, rector of Grace Church; R. Heber Newton, rector of All Souls Church in New York.

In the American Episcopal Church (TEC), the term "broad church" traditionally represented a desire to accommodate a range of conservative and liberal theological views under one Episcopal umbrella, as opposed to disputes over ritualism, where the terms "low church"/"evangelical" and "high church" ordinarily applied.

On paper and perhaps in practice, Broad Church institutions like the Church Congress in the United States (founded in 1874) and the Episcopal Theological School (founded in 1867) sought to accommodate "all parties and positions". William Reed Huntington, for example, was described as "Broad in the sense of inclusive, not in the sense of Liberal." Church historian Robert W. Prichard says that the Church Congress' emphasis on denominational unity helped TEC "avoid[] the divisions over biblical scholarship that marked some other American denominations", and largely credits the Congress for the fact that TEC never endured "wholesale inquisitions of seminaries or college faculties".

However, the practical significance of the Broad Church movement was that it gave theological liberalism a foothold in TEC at a time when the low church and high church factions were both dominated by conservatives. Although ostensibly anti-factional, the Church Congress' leaders were "all progressive liberals in a basically conservative church." Until the 1870s, TEC's conservative leadership had generally taken a neutral stance towards hot-button issues like abolitionism. Following the Civil War, the Broad Church organized to actively support liberal causes. According to TEC, the movement sought to be "more tolerant and liberal than the views of the existing low church and high church parties", and emphasized "reason as a mediator of religious truth, as opposed to the exclusive reliance on scripture and tradition in the other parties."

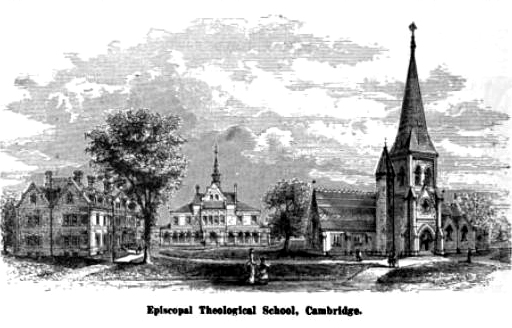
The Episcopal Theological School in Cambridge, Massachusetts, was a stronghold of the Broad Church and theological progressivism. It was formerly affiliated with the nearby Harvard Divinity School.

The Broad Church movement provided a space for liberal and progressive theologians who might have been frozen out of more conservative factions. Episcopal Theological School was "the first Episcopal theological seminary to welcome modern biblical scholarship", and the Broad Church movement "for nearly three decades held a practical monopoly of modernistic views in the American [Episcopal] Church." Figures like R. Heber Newton (who was accused of heresy several times), his brother William Wilberforce Newton, and Church Congress chairman Charles Lewis Slattery were commonly identified with the Broad Church, although their views might be described as conventionally liberal years after the fact. Heber Newton is now remembered by TEC as a "leading liberal preacher"; William Newton "called for the church ... to appropriate the truths of evolution and science"; and Slattery chaired the commission that revised the Book of Common Prayer to be more gender-inclusive and to de-emphasize the doctrine of original sin.

Once TEC accepted its progressives, the Broad Church's emphasis on tolerance became somewhat anachronistic. The revised Book of Common Prayer was published in 1928, and the Church Congress held its last convention in 1934. Many of the Congress' leaders migrated to the newly established Liberal Evangelical Congress, which first convened in 1933. (The term "evangelical" is a historical artifact. In the 1860s and 1870s, most conservative evangelicals left TEC, often for the Reformed Episcopal Church; as a result, by the mid-1870s, within TEC, the term "evangelical" was largely synonymous with "low-church liberal". For example, the TEC dictionary describes Broad Church preacher Phillips Brooks, a theological liberal, as a "broad church evangelical", and stresses that TEC's "liberal evangelical" tendency "accept[ed] a critical stance toward the biblical text.")

=== Contemporary usage ===
Although the term is no longer in general use, certain modern-day Episcopal churches use "broad church" to describe an attitude towards ritual that is between the low church and the high church, somewhat akin to central churchmanship in the Church of England. A broad church parish might favor Holy Eucharist Rite II in the Book of Common Prayer (1979), which uses more contemporary language than Rite I, whereas a high church parish might favor Rite I and a low church parish might alternate between Holy Eucharist Rite II and the even more informal Morning Prayer.

Today, institutions historically associated with the Broad Church (in the Church Congress sense) may now style themselves as low church. Examples include Trinity Church in Boston, which was considered low church under the leadership of Anne Bonnymann (r. 2006-11) but still "continu[ed] to be a Broad Church parish"; and Groton School, where Morning Prayer is still celebrated.

== In politics ==
By way of an analogy, the term broad church has been used with regard to political parties, particularly the British Labour Party and the African National Congress. It can denote both a wide range of ideological views within a single organisation, as well as describe a party that seeks to attract a wide voter base with differing points of view. "Big tent" is a similar term in American politics, also with religious origins.

== See also ==
- Central churchmanship
- High church
- Liberal Anglo-Catholicism
- Low church
- Churchmanship
