= Erich Harnack =

German pharmacologist and toxicologist

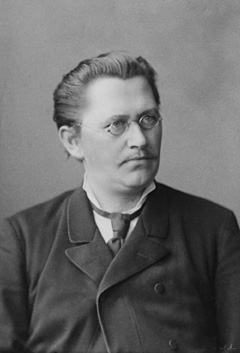
Erich Harnack

Friedrich Moritz Erich Harnack (10 October [O.S. 28 September] 1852, Dorpat (now Tartu) – 24 April 1915 Halle an der Saale) was a pharmacologist and toxicologist from the Russian Empire of Baltic-German ethnicity.

From 1869 he studied medicine at the Imperial University of Dorpat, receiving his doctorate in 1873 with the dissertation Zur Pathogenese und Therapie des Diabetes mellitus ("Pathogenesis and therapy regarding diabetes mellitus"). From 1873 he worked as an assistant at the pharmacological institute of the University of Straßburg, and in 1877 obtained his habilitation. In 1880 he became an associate professor of pharmacology and physiological chemistry at the University of Halle, where in 1889 he attained a full professorship. In 1891 he founded an institute of pharmacology at the university. He is remembered for his pharmacological studies of physostigmine and apomorphine.

He was the son of theologian Theodosius Harnack and the brother of theologian Adolf von Harnack, mathematician Carl Gustav Axel Harnack and literary historian Otto Harnack.

== Selected works ==
- Die Bedeutung pharmakologischer Thatsachen für die Physiologie des Froschherzens, 1881 – Pharmacological facts regarding physiology of the frog heart.
- Lehrbuch der Arzneimittellehre und Arzneiverordnungslehre, 1883 (based on Lehrbuch der Arzneimittellehre by Rudolf Buchheim).
- Die Hauptthatsachen der Chemie, 1887 – The primary facts of chemistry.
- Die Dosen unserer officinellen und neu eingeführten Arzneimittel, 1890 – Dosages of official and newly introduced medicines.
- Die Bibel und die alkoholischen Getränke, 1894 – The Bible and alcoholic beverages.
- Vergiftungen durch Metalle, Metalloide, Kohlenstoffverbindungen, Pflanzenstoffe, 1901 – Poisoning by metals, metalloids, carbon compounds, plant substances.
- Ueber die Vergiftung durch Speisekartoffeln, 1904 – On the poisoning of potatoes.
- Tierschutz und Vivisektion, 1906 – Animal protection and vivisection.
- Studien über Hautelektrizität und Hautmagnetismus des Menschen, 1905.
- Das Gift in der dramatischen Dichtung und in der antiken Literatur, 1908 – Poison in dramatic poetry and ancient literature.
- Pharmakologisches und Therapeutisches über die Maxquelle, die Arsenquelle des Bades Dürkheim, 1912 – Pharmacological and therapeutic aspects of the Maxquelle, the arsenic source at Bad Dürkheim.
- Die gerichtliche Medizin, 1914 – On forensic medicine.
- Arbeiten über das Physostignum und Calabarin (with L. Witkowski) – Works on physostigmine and calabarine.
- The effects of lead on the animal organism (English translation, 1960).
