= Otto Harnack =

German literary historian (1857–1914)

Rudolf Gottfried Otto Harnack (23 November 1857, in Erlangen – 22 March 1914, near Besigheim) was a German literary historian, best known for his writings on Johann Wolfgang von Goethe.

== Biography ==
He studied history and philology at the universities of Dorpat and Göttingen, receiving his doctorate at the latter institution in 1880. After graduation, he worked as a schoolteacher in Dorpat (from 1882), a school director in Wenden (from 1887), an employee of the Preussische Jahrbücher in Berlin (from 1889) and as a journalist in Rome (from 1891). In 1896 he was named a professor of history and literature at the Technische Hochschule in Darmstadt, then in 1905 relocated to the Technical College of Stuttgart as a professor of literature and aesthetics. On 22 March 1914 he committed suicide.

He was the son of theologian Theodosius Harnack, the brother of theologian Adolf von Harnack, mathematician Carl Gustav Axel Harnack and pharmacologist Erich Harnack. He was the father of screenwriter Falk Harnack and jurist Arvid Harnack.

== Selected works ==
- Goethe in der epoche seiner vollendung 1805-1832 (1887) – Goethe in the epoch of his perfection, 1805–1832.
- Deutsches kunstleben in Rom im zeitalter der klassik (1892) – German artistic life in Rome during the classical age.
- Über Goethe's Verhältnis zu Shakespeare (1896) – Goethe's relationship with Shakespeare.
- Schiller (1898) – On Friedrich Schiller.
- Essais und studien zur literaturgeschichte (1899) – Essays and studies of literary history.
- Goethe und das Theater (1900) – Goethe and the theater.
- Der gang der handlung in Goethes Faust (1902) – The course of action in Goethe's Faust.
- Der Deutsche Klassizismus im Zeitalter Goethes (1906) – German classicism in the era of Goethe.
- Aufsätze und vorträge (1911) – Articles and lectures.
- Wilhelm von Humboldt (1912) – On Wilhelm von Humboldt.

Also, he made contributions as an editor to Karl Heinemann's multi-volume Goethes Werke.
