= Clara von Simson =

German politician

Clara von Simson (born 4 October 1897 in Rome, died 26 January 1983 in Berlin) was a habilitated natural scientist, German politician (FDP) and a member of the Berlin House of Representatives.

== Biography ==
Clara von Simson, the daughter of Georg von Simson, a Berlin banker, and a great-granddaughter of the temporary president of the Frankfurt National Assembly in 1848/49, Eduard von Simson. She attended a private schooling, followed by a Höhere Töchterschule and an English college. She studied mathematics and physics briefly in Heidelberg and physics and chemistry at the Friedrich Wilhelm University in Berlin from 1918 to 1923. In 1923, she received her doctorate in the field of experimental physics on the subject of X-ray structure investigations. She completed her dissertation Röntgen-Untersuchung an Amalgamen under supervision of Franz Simon, Max von Laue, and Max Bodenstein. From 1927 to 1930, she was an assistant at the Physical Chemistry Institute in Berlin. In April 1931, she became temporary lecturer in mathematics and physics at the Pedagogical Academy Dortmund, but stopped at her own request and became a private scholar. Due to the National Socialists, she was not allowed to attend the Physical Colloquium starting in 1935 and she started to live on translations. She was supported by her promoter Max von Laue, to whose circle of friends she belonged. From 1939 to 1945, she worked for the Patent Attorney Office Wüsthoff in Berlin and supported politically and racially persecuted in her free time.

Politically unencumbered, she was again able to work at Technische Universität Berlin directly in 1945, became a senior engineer in thermodynamics in chemistry at the Chair of Inorganic Chemistry and habilitated there as the first woman in physics (thermal conductivity of ammonium chloride) in 1951. In 1949/50, she was visited her former doctoral supervisor Franz Simon for a research stay in Oxford. Franz Simon had emigrated to Oxford. In 1952, she left the TU Berlin and became director of the Lette Association which was devoted to the education of women. She remained the director until 1963.

== Politics ==
Since 1949, von Simson was a member of the FDP (or originally LDPD). As a FDP member, she was part of the Berlin House of Representatives from 1963 to 1971. In parliament, she was a member of the committees for science and art and education. From 1958 to 1977 she was a member of the board of trustees of the Friedrich Naumann Foundation. The last nine years of this time, she was the chairwoman. Together with Agnes von Zahn-Harnack, Gertrud Bäumer, Elly Heuss-Knapp, and Marie-Elisabeth Lüders, she belonged to a circle of friends around Freda Wuesthoff, who protested with her Arbeitsprogramm für den dauernden Frieden against nuclear weapons.

She found her last resting place on the Friedhof III der Jerusalems- und Neuen Kirchengemeinde. The honorary grave of the city of Berlin is located in the abbot 4/3. The estate of Clara von Simson is in the archive of Liberalism of the Friedrich Naumann Foundation in Gummersbach.

== Honors ==
Clara von Simson was appointed honorary senator of the TU Berlin in 1966 and she was appointed city elder of Berlin in 1973. In 1967, she received the Cross of Merit 1st class of the Federal Republic of Germany. In 1978, she received the Great Federal Cross of Merit.

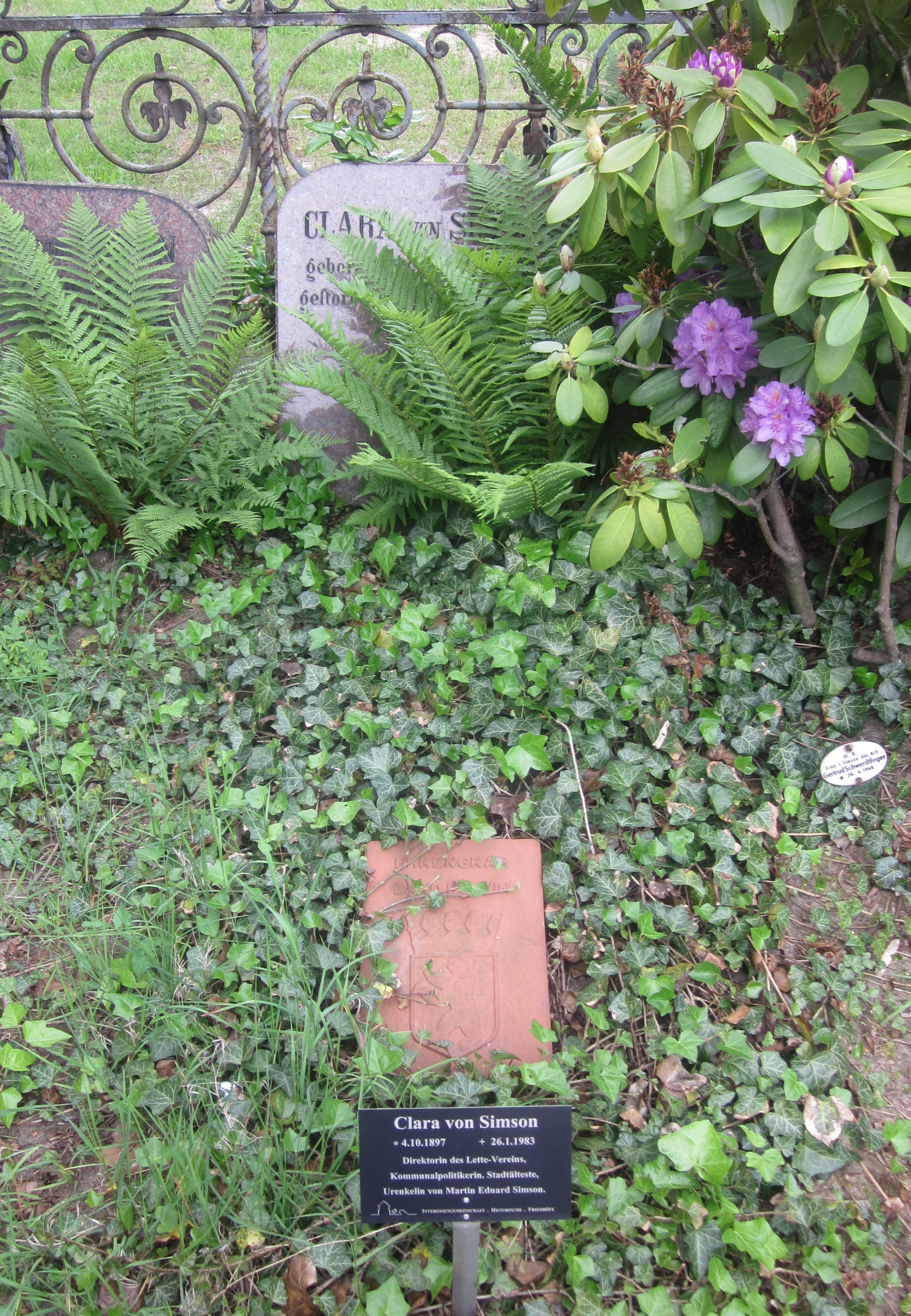
Grave of Clara von Simson

The Clara von Simson Prize is awarded by Technische Universität Berlin for the best theses of female students especially in natural and technical sciences. Furthermore, a street in Berlin-Charlottenburg in the Spreebogen is named after her. Furthermore, an association to promote the Lette Association is named after her.

== Publications ==
- Roentgen-Untersuchungen an Amalgamen (Diss., Berlin, 1923)
- von Simson, Cl. (1924). "Röntgenuntersuchungen an Amalgamen". Zeitschrift für Physikalische Chemie. 109U (1): 183–198. doi:10.1515/zpch-1924-10916. ISSN 0942-9352. S2CID 99161547.
- Simon, Franz; von Simson, Clara (1924-12-01). "Die Kristallstruktur des Chlorwasserstoffs". Zeitschrift für Physik (in German). 21 (1): 168–177. Bibcode:1924ZPhy...21..168S. doi:10.1007/BF01328260. ISSN 0044-3328. S2CID 120224731.
- Simon, Franz; von Simson, Clara (1924-12-01). "Die Kristallstruktur des Argons". Zeitschrift für Physik (in German). 25 (1): 160–164. Bibcode:1924ZPhy...25..160S. doi:10.1007/BF01327517. ISSN 0044-3328. S2CID 120911644.
- Verständig, E.; von Simson, Clara; Menzer, G. (1926). von Laue, Max; von Mises, Richard (eds.). Stereoscopic drawings of crystal structures. Julius Springer.
- Sackur, Otto; von Simson, Cl. (1928). Lehrbuch der Thermochemie und Thermodynamik (2 ed.). Berlin: Verlag von Julius Springer. ISBN 9783642913129.
- Lehrbuch der Physik für die Oberschule (with Paul Schauff; Berlin: Volk u. Wissen, 1949
- “Über die Wärmeleitfähigkeit des Ammoniumchlorids im Bereiche seiner II-III-Umwandlung”, in: Naturwissenschaften 38, Nr. 24 (1951), S. 559

== Sources ==
- Ulla Galm: Clara von Simson. Tochter aus liberalem Hause, Berlin 1984 (= Preußische Köpfe).
- Cornelia Denz/Annette Vogt (Hrsg.): Einsteins Kolleginnen. Physikerinnen gestern & heute, Bielefeld 2005, S. 18.
- Monika Faßbender: Clara von Simson. In: Irmgard Schwaetzer (Hrsg.), Die liberale Frauenbewegung – Lebensbilder, Berlin 2007, S. 137–149.
- Doris Obschernitzki: Der Frau ihre Arbeit – Lette-Verein. Zur Geschichte einer Berliner Institution 1866 bis 1986, Berlin 1987.
- Barthold C. Witte: Erziehung zur Mündigkeit. Zum Gedenken an Clara von Simson. In: Von der Freiheit des Geistes. Positionsbestimmungen eines Jahrzehnts. Sankt Augustin 1998.
- Werner Breunig, Andreas Herbst: Biografisches Handbuch der Berliner Abgeordneten 1963–1995 und Stadtverordneten 1990/1991. Landesarchiv Berlin 2016, ISBN 978-3-9803303-5-0, S. 351 f.
