= Harnick =

Harnick is a surname. Notable people with the surname include:

- Charles Harnick (born 1950), Canadian politician
- Sheldon Harnick (1924–2023), American lyricist

== See also ==
- Harnack
- Harrick
- Harvick
