= Stifterverband für die Deutsche Wissenschaft =

German nonprofit association

Stifterverband für die Deutsche Wissenschaft – or Stifterverband for short – is a registered not-for-profit association that is based in Essen and which also has a capital city office in Berlin. Its work is focused on education, science and innovation. The Stifterverband organisation analyses, advises, supports and networks science and business.

Through the German Foundation Centre (DSZ), the Stifterverband also sponsors some 670 foundations at present, most of which are dedicated to advancing science. The Stifterverband was established in 1920 as “Stifterverband der Notgemeinschaft der deutschen Wissenschaft” (Stifterverband Emergency Association of German Science).

The Stifterverband is financed first and foremost through the donations of its approximately 3,000 members. Its primary sponsors include numerous major corporations such as Deutsche Bank, Daimler or Bosch. Other sponsors include SMEs and private individuals. In 2021, the Stifterverband invested €44.5 million in its support programmes. The biggest single item here, €11.6 million, is accounted for by foundation chairs at universities and advanced technical colleges.

== Chairpersons and presidents ==
Michael Kaschke has been President of the Stifterverband since 2022. He succeeded entrepreneur Andreas Barner, who had held this position since 2013. Volker Meyer-Guckel has held the position of General Secretary since January 2022. The Deputy General Secretary is Andrea Frank.

- 1920 to 1934: Carl Friedrich von Siemens
- 1934 to 1935: Carl Duisberg
- 1935 to 1945: Friedrich Schmidt-Ott
- 1949 to 1955: Richard Merton
- 1955 to 1970: Ernst H. Vits
- 1970 to 1974: Hellmut Ley
- 1974 to 1980: Hans-Helmut Kuhnke
- 1980 to 1993: Klaus Liesen
- 1993 to 1998: Karlheinz Kaske
- 1998 to 2013: Arend Oetker
- 2013 to 2021: Andreas Barner
- Since 2022: Michael Kaschke

== Key activities ==
- Improving the capabilities of the scientific system
- Providing support for higher education institutions
- Improving national and international collaboration in the fields of science and academia
- Providing support for young academics
- Analysing and optimising innovation processes
- Improving collaboration between science, policymakers, business and society
- Working to make scientific and academic knowledge accessible to the general public.

== Partners ==
The Stifterverband's primary partners are the German Research Foundation (DFG), the Max Planck Society (MPG), the German Academic Exchange Service (DAAD), the Alexander von Humboldt Foundation and the German Academic Scholarship Foundation (Studienstiftung des deutschen Volkes).

== Awards ==
The Stifterverband works closely with various German research organisations to award prize money for successful research work that is considered to be especially deserving of support.

In collaboration with the German Research Foundation (DFG), the Stifterverband presents the Communicator Award. This personal award includes prize money of €50,000 and is given to scientists in any discipline who have done an outstanding job of communicating the findings of their scientific work and field in the media and to the non-scientific public.

In collaboration with the Helmholtz Association, the organisation has been presenting the Erwin Schrödinger Award for interdisciplinary research annually since 1999.

Since 2022, the Stifterverband has been collaborating with the Max Planck Society to present the Stifterverband's Max Planck Start-up Award. Every two years, this award singles out successful start-ups launched by the Max Planck Society that have had a particularly positive impact on society. The Fraunhofer Society for the Advancement of Applied Research and the Leibniz Association (“Science Award: Society Needs Science”) each have their own science award. The internal bodies of the respective scientific societies are responsible for independently determining the winners of these awards.

The Ars legendi Award for outstanding instruction in higher education) has been presented since 2006 in collaboration with the German Rectors’ Conference (HRK).

Together with Leopoldina, the Stifterverband has been presenting the Carl Friedrich von Weizsäcker Award every two years since 2009. This award honours scientists or teams of researchers who have contributed to the scientific study of important problems that pose a challenge to society.

Since 2017, the Stifterverband has been working with the Volkswagen Foundation to present the Genius Loci Award for Excellence in Teaching to universities. The award is given to one advanced technical college and one university that have each demonstrated excellence in the instruction they provide. Each award-winner receives €20,000 for the purpose of inviting a visiting scholar of teaching and learning in higher education to their institution.

The Stifterverband has administered the German Future Prize since 1997. In doing so, it works to obtain the necessary funds for awards as well as overseeing the bodies involved and organising the selection process and presentation of the awards.

From 1970 to 1979, the Stifterverband presented a special award at the annual presentation of the Adolf Grimme Award.

=== City of Science award ===
The Stifterverband presented the City of Science award between 2004 and 2013 in an effort to spur cities and metropolitan regions to greater achievements and increased support in the field of science. The award singled out regions where science played an integral role in business and culture. Another significant factor in the selection process was bringing science to the attention of the general public.

== Research Summit (Forschungsgipfel) ==
Since 2015, the Stifterverband has been organising an annual Research Summit in Berlin (together with Leopoldina and the Commission of Experts for Research and Innovation). Some 400 experts from the fields of science, business, politics and civil society come to the Research Summit to discuss key issues relating to research and innovation policies in Germany.

Topics at the Research Summit:

- 2019: Artificial Intelligence – driving a new generation of innovation
- 2020: Moving past economic stimulus programmes – what steps do we need to take in the post-coronavirus world to establish a resilient and agile innovation system
- 2021: The innovation system for the next generation
- 2022: Innovation policy for a new era – more dynamism and new priorities

== Literature ==
- Winfried Schulze: Der Stifterverband für die Deutsche Wissenschaft: 1920-1995. ISBN 3-05-002900-5.
- Stifterverband (publisher): Etappen – 100 Jahre Stifterverband. Edition Stifterverband, Essen 2020, ISBN 978-3-922275-93-0
