= Freda Wuesthoff =

German patent attorney and pacifist

- Born: Freda Anna Lina Eugenie Hoffmann; May 16, 1896; Leipzig, Germany
- Died: November 5, 1956; Munich, Germany
- Occupations: Patent attorney, pacifist

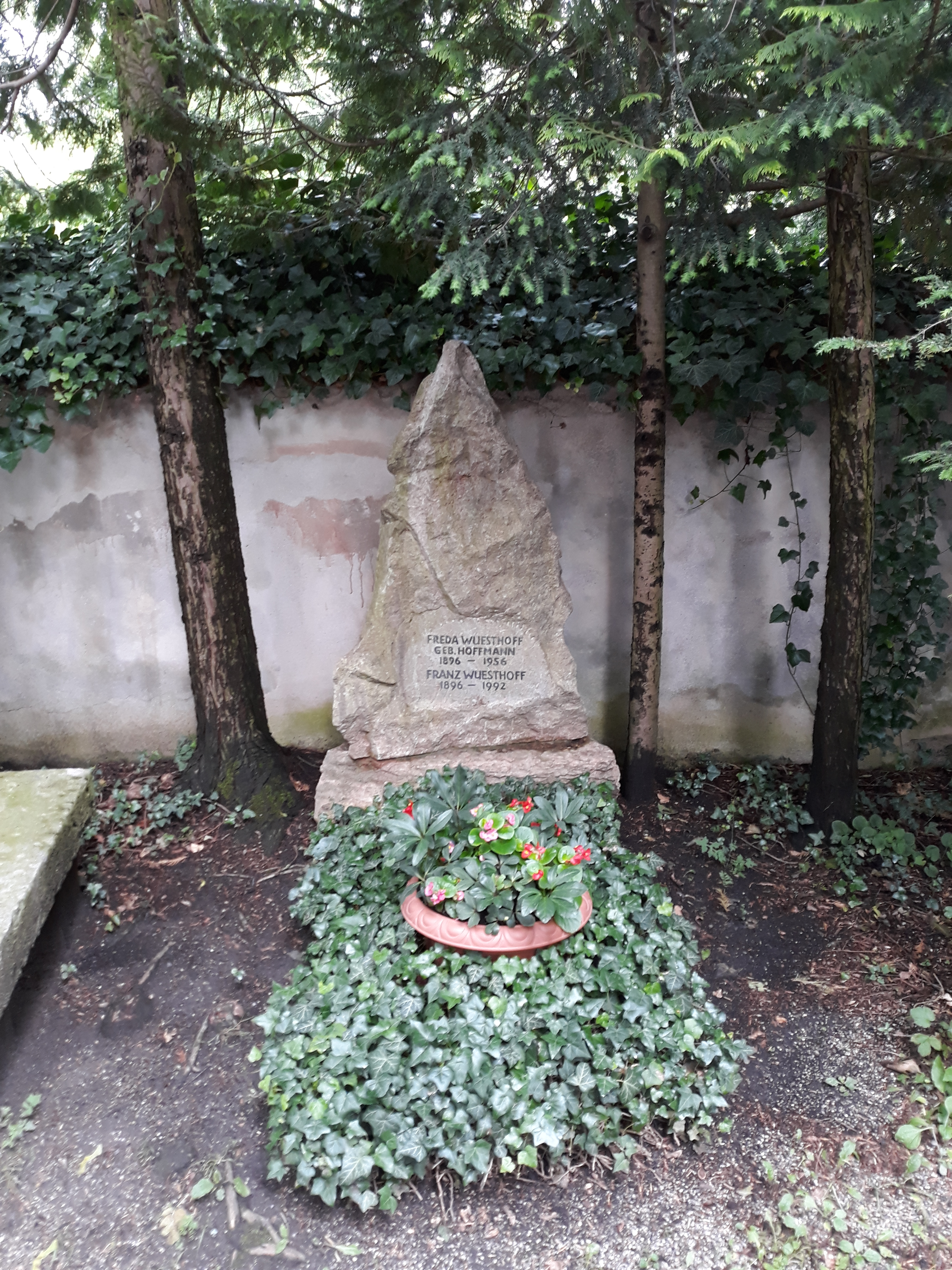
Freda Wuesthoff and her husband Franz's burial plots at Bogenhausen Cemetery in Munich

Freda Wuesthoff (born Freda Anna Lina Eugenie Hoffmann; 16 May 1896 in Leipzig; died 5 November 1956 in Munich) was a German patent attorney and pacifist. She was one of the co-founders of the organised peace movement in Germany.

== Life ==
Freda Hofmann came from a middle-class family and graduated from high school in 1914. She then studied physics, chemistry and mathematics and doctorate (PhD) in Munich. In 1924, she headed the physics department of the Institute for Sugar Industry. Together with her fiancé, Franz Wuesthoff, she then trained as a patent attorney, which she successfully completed in 1927. She was thus the first woman to become a patent attorney in Germany. Together with Franz Wuesthoff, she founded the patent law firm Wuesthoff & Wuesthoff in Berlin in 1927, whose office they also moved to Munich after the German Patent Office relocated in 1949. The firm specialised in plant variety protection.

During the National Socialist era, she was not allowed to pursue her professional activity as a so-called "half-Jew". The dropping of the atomic bombs on Hiroshima and Nagasaki led her to work for peace. With a doctorate in physics, she warned the German public of the dangers of nuclear energy. She founded the "Stuttgart Peace Circle", in which she gathered like-minded women from all over Germany. The Peace Circle campaigned for peace promotion, formulated peace articles for the constitutions of some federal states and the Basic Law and drafted a work programme for peace in German schools. Wuesthoff worked together with, among others: Agnes von Zahn-Harnack, Elly Heuss-Knapp, Marie Elisabeth Lüders, Gertrud Bäumer and Theanolte Bähnisch. The latter founded the German Women's Ring in 1949, in which Wuesthoff played a responsible role, first as head of the "Peace Commission", then as its official advisor for nuclear issues. In this capacity, she was a member of the Federal Government's Radiation Protection Commission until the end. In addition, Freda Wuesthoff was also active in her profession again, including in various commissions for industrial property protection.

Freda Wuesthoff died on 5 November 1956 in Munich of an embolism as a result of a severe arm fracture. She is buried in the Bogenhausen Cemetery.

== Writings ==
- 1957: Atomenergie und Frieden (with Franz Wuesthoff)
- 1957: Es ist keine Zeit mehr zu verlieren (with O. Maier)
- 1958: Wir haben die Wahl (with Franz Wuesthoff)

== Honours ==
The Freda-Wuesthoff-Weg in München-Bogenhausen is named after Freda Wuesthoff. Also in Freiburg im Breisgau there is the Freda-Wuesthoff-Weg named after her and the Freda-Wuesthoff-Straße in Lemgo.

== Literature ==
- Freda Herzfeld-Hoffmann (= Freda Wuesthoff): Frauen als Patentanwälte. In: Mitteilungen der deutschen Patentanwälte, 1930, pp. 232–233
- Günther Berthold: Freda Wuesthoff, eine Faszination. Herder, 1984. ISBN 3-451-08018-4
- Marion Röwekamp: Freda Wuesthoff (1896-1954). In: Simon Apel et al. (eds.): Biographisches Handbuch des Geistigen Eigentums, Verlag: Mohr Siebeck, Tübingen 2017, ISBN 978-3-16-154999-1, pp. 279–282.
