= Notgemeinschaft der Deutschen Wissenschaft =

The Notgemeinschaft der Deutschen Wissenschaft (Emergency Association of German Science) or NG was founded on 30 October 1920 on the initiative of leading members of the Preußische Akademie der Wissenschaften (Prussian Academy of Sciences, PAW) – Fritz Haber, Max Planck, and Ernst von Harnack – and former Prussian Minister of Culture Friedrich Schmidt-Ott. Physicist Heinrich Konen, involved in founding and building the organization due to his relationship with Schmidt-Ott, became a long-standing member of its executive committee. Member institutions of the NG included all German universities, all polytechnics (Technische Hochschulen), the five German Academies of Science, and the Kaiser-Wilhelm Gesellschaft. In 1929, the NG was renamed the Deutsche Gemeinschaft zur Erhaltung und Förderung der Forschung (German Association for the Support and Advancement of Scientific Research); also known in short as the Deutsche Forschungsgemeinschaft (DFG). Until 1934, the NG acted under supervision of the Reichsinnenministerium (Reich Interior Ministry), and after that under the Reichserziehungsministerium (Reich Education Ministry). In 1945, by the end of World War II in Germany, the NG was no longer active. In 1949, it was re-established in the newly founded Federal Republic of Germany as the NG and from 1951 as the DFG.

The objective of the NG was to provide the regional, disciplinary, and political factions of the academic community with a central institution to facilitate raising and distributing funds for the totality of German sciences and humanities. Originally, it was to alleviate especially the increased financial needs after World War I due to monetary inflation and generally higher costs in research. As presiding secretary of the PAW, Planck briefly headed the NG until Schmidt-Ott was installed as president. The NG was successful in raising funds and support from the central German government as well as financial contributions from corporate sources in Germany and abroad and the US-based Emergency Society for German and Austrian Science and Art established by German-born US anthropologist Franz Boas.

== Presidents of the NG/DFG ==
Portrait	Name	Took office	Left office
	Friedrich Schmidt-Ott	1920	1934
	Johannes Stark	1934	1936
	Rudolf Mentzel	1936	1945

From 1949 to 1951, Walter Gerlach was a vice-president of the NG.

== Bibliography ==
- Flachowsky, Sören Von der Notgemeinschaft zum Reichsforschungsrat. Wissenschaftspolitik im Kontext von Autarkie, Aufrüstung und Krieg (Steiner, 2008)
- Heilbron, J. L. The Dilemmas of an Upright Man: Max Planck and the Fortunes of German Science (Harvard, 2000) ISBN 0-674-00439-6
- Hentschel, Klaus, editor and Ann M. Hentschel, editorial assistant and Translator Physics and National Socialism: An Anthology of Primary Sources (Birkhäuser, 1996)
- Penaloza-Patzak, Brooke “Friends in Deed: Allied in the Interwar Struggle for ‘German’ Science and Art,” Academies and World War I: The Aftermath, special issue of Acta Historical Leopoldina 78 (2021): 139-160 http://data.isiscb.org/isis/citation/CBB978495186/
- Zierold, Kurt Forschungsförderung in drei Epochen. Deutsche Forschungsgemeinschaft: Geschichte, Arbeitsweise, Kommentar (Steiner, 1968)
