= Rudolf Handmann =

Swiss pastor and theologian (1862–1940)

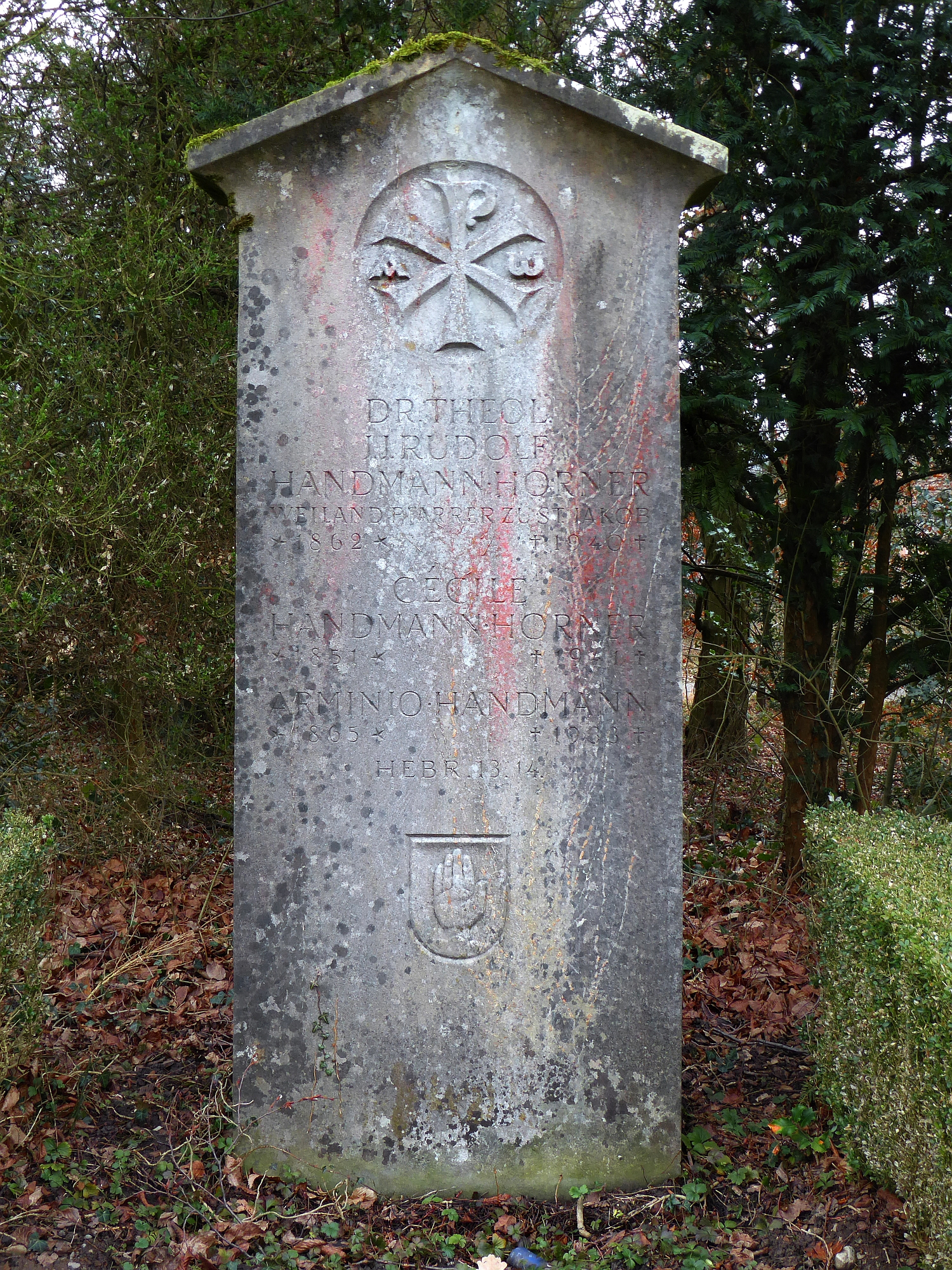
J.J.Rudolf Handmann-Horner (1862–1940)

J. J. Rudolf Handmann (1862–1940) was a Swiss pastor, professor, theologian and biblical scholar. He was a student of Adolf von Harnack. He was pastor of St. Jacob's Church in Basel, part of the Basel Münster congregation, from 1890 to his retirement on 5 May 1935.

== Works ==
- Das Hebräer-Evangelium - Ein Beitrag zur Geschichte und Kritik des hebräischen Matthäus 1888
