= Langtry =

Langtry may refer to:

- Langtry (surname)
- Langtry, Texas, a town
- Langtry, a crater on Venus

== See also ==
- Langtree (disambiguation)
