= Harnack's inequality =

Inequality for Harmonic Functions

In mathematics, Harnack's inequality is an inequality relating the values of a positive harmonic function at two points, introduced by A. Harnack (1887). Harnack's inequality is used to prove Harnack's theorem about the convergence of sequences of harmonic functions. J. Serrin (1955), and J. Moser (1961, 1964) generalized Harnack's inequality to solutions of elliptic or parabolic partial differential equations. Such results can be used to show the interior regularity of weak solutions.

Perelman's solution of the Poincaré conjecture uses a version of the Harnack inequality, found by R. Hamilton (1993), for the Ricci flow.

== The statement ==
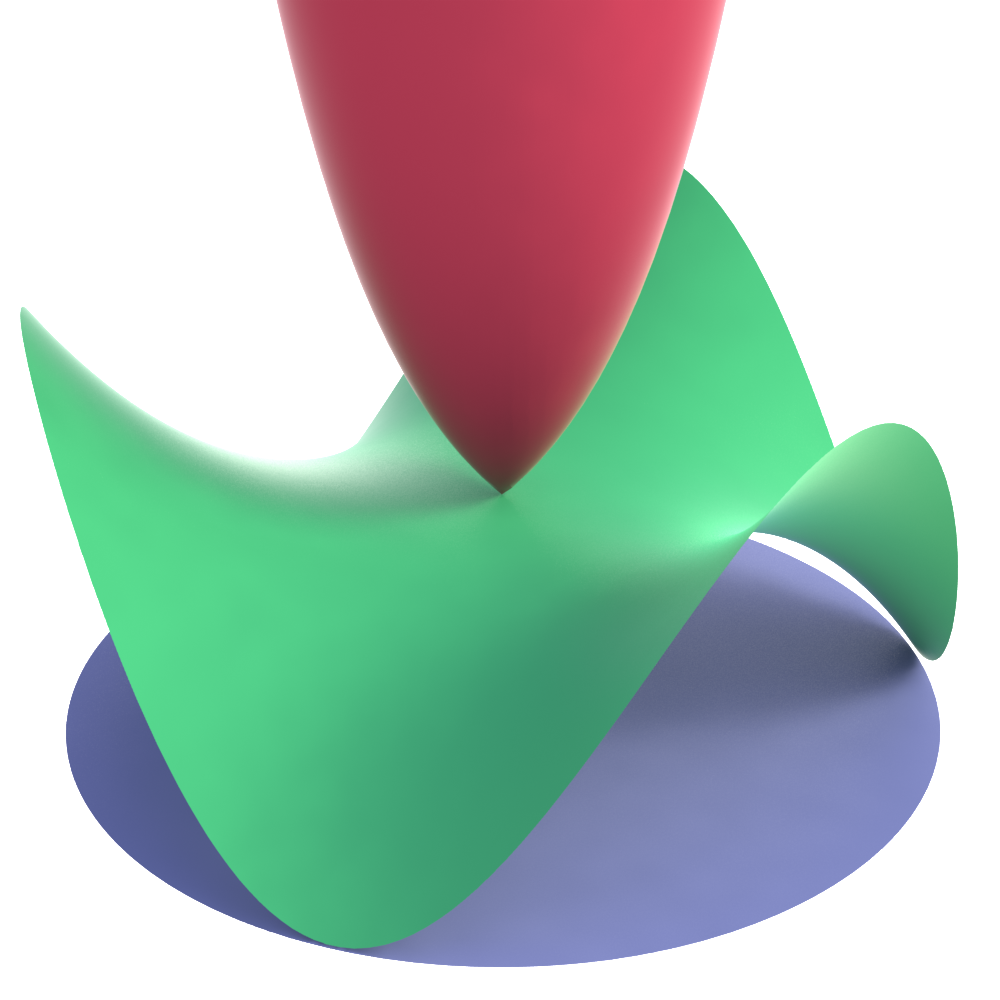
A harmonic function (green) over a disk (blue) is bounded from above by a function (red) that coincides with the harmonic function at the disk center and approaches infinity towards the disk boundary.

Harnack's inequality applies to a non-negative function f defined on a closed ball in R^{n} with radius R and centre x_{0}. It states that, if f is continuous on the closed ball and harmonic on its interior, then for every point x with |x − x_{0}| = r < R,

$$\frac{1-(r/R)} {[1+(r/R)]^{n-1}} f(x_0)\le f(x) \le  {1+(r/R)\over [1 - (r/R)]^{n-1}} f(x_0).$$

In the plane R^{2} (n = 2) the inequality can be written:

$${R-r\over R+r} f(x_0)\le f(x)\le {R+r\over R-r}f(x_0).$$

For general domains $\Omega$ in $\mathbf{R}^n$ the inequality can be stated as follows: If $\omega$ is a bounded domain with $\bar{\omega} \subset \Omega$, then there is a constant $C$ such that

$$\sup_{x \in \omega} u(x) \le C \inf_{x \in \omega} u(x)$$

for every twice differentiable, harmonic and nonnegative function $u(x)$. The constant $C$ is independent of $u$; it depends only on the domains $\Omega$ and $\omega$.

== Proof of Harnack's inequality in a ball ==
By Poisson's formula

$$f(x) = \frac 1 {\omega_{n-1}} \int_{|y-x_0|=R} \frac{R^2 -r^2}{R|x - y|^n} \cdot f(y) \, dy,$$

where ω_{n − 1} is the area of the unit sphere in R^{n} and r = |x − x_{0}|.

Since

$$R-r \le |x-y| \le R+r,$$

the kernel in the integrand satisfies

$$\frac{R -r}{R (R+r)^{n-1}} \le \frac{R^2 -r^2}{R|x-y|^n}\le \frac{R+r}{R(R-r)^{n-1}}.$$

Harnack's inequality follows by substituting this inequality in the above integral and using the fact that the average of a harmonic function over a sphere equals its value at the center of the sphere:

$$f(x_0)= \frac 1 {R^{n-1}\omega_{n-1}} \int_{|y-x_0|=R} f(y)\, dy.$$

== Elliptic partial differential equations ==
For elliptic partial differential equations, Harnack's inequality states that the supremum of a positive solution in some connected open region is bounded by some constant times the infimum, possibly with an added term containing a functional norm of the data:

$$\sup u \le C ( \inf u + \|f\|)$$

The constant depends on the ellipticity of the equation and the connected open region.

== Parabolic partial differential equations ==
There is a version of Harnack's inequality for linear parabolic PDEs such as heat equation.

Let $\mathcal{M}$ be a smooth (bounded) domain in $\mathbb{R}^n$ and consider the linear elliptic operator

$$\mathcal{L}u=\sum_{i,j=1}^n a_{ij}(t,x)\frac{\partial^2 u}{\partial x_i\,\partial x_j} + \sum_{i=1}^n b_i(t,x)\frac{\partial u}{\partial x_i} + c(t,x)u$$

with smooth and bounded coefficients and a positive definite matrix $(a_{ij})$. Suppose that $u(t,x)\in C^2((0,T)\times\mathcal{M})$ is a solution of

$\frac{\partial u}{\partial t}-\mathcal{L}u=0$ in $(0,T)\times\mathcal{M}$

such that

$$\quad u(t,x)\ge0 \text{ in } (0,T)\times\mathcal{M}.$$

Let $K$ be compactly contained in $\mathcal{M}$ and choose $\tau\in(0,T)$. Then there exists a constant C > 0 (depending only on K, $\tau$, $t-\tau$, and the coefficients of $\mathcal{L}$) such that, for each $t\in(\tau,T)$,

$$\sup_K u(t-\tau,\cdot)\le C \inf_K u(t,\cdot).$$

== See also ==
- Harnack's theorem
