= R. Heber Newton =

American priest (1840–1914)

Richard Heber Newton
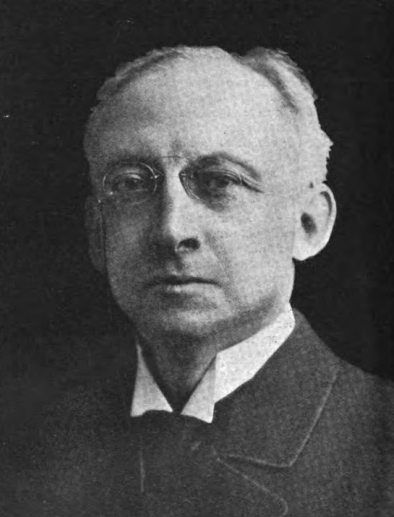
- Newton in 1907
- Born: October 31, 1840; Philadelphia, Pennsylvania
- Died: December 19, 1914 (aged 74); Scarborough, New York
- Occupations: Priest and writer
- Known for: Social Gospel leader and supporter of Higher Criticism
- Notable work: The Morals of Trade, The Right and Wrong Uses of the Bible (1883)

Richard Heber Newton (October 31, 1840 – December 19, 1914) was a prominent American Episcopalian priest and writer.

== Biography ==
R. Heber Newton was born in Philadelphia, Pennsylvania on October 31, 1840. He was rector of All Souls' Protestant Episcopal Church in New York City from 1869 to 1902. He was a leader in the Social Gospel movement, a supporter of Higher Criticism of the Bible, and sought to unify Christian churches in the United States.

Scholars have seen his 1874-1875 lectures, The Morals of Trade, as an important early statement of some of the concerns which were prominent in the Social Gospel movement.

In 1883 he was accused of heresy for a series of sermons later published in a book, The Right and Wrong Uses of the Bible. He was again accused in 1884 and 1891 but the bishop, Henry Codman Potter, refused to go forward.

In 1903 he briefly served as first and last pastor of Stanford Memorial Church at Stanford University.

He died at his home in Scarborough, New York on December 19, 1914.

== Works ==
- The Morals of Trade (1876)
- Studies of Jesus (1880)
- Womanhood: Lectures on a Woman's Work in the World (1881)
- The Right and Wrong Uses of the Bible (1883)
- Philistinism: Plain Words concerning Certain Forms of Modern Scepticism (1885)
- Church and Creed (1891)
- The Mysticism of Music (1915)
- Catholicity: A Treatise on the Unity of Religion (1918)
