= Friedrich Schmidt-Ott =

German lawyer (1860–1956)

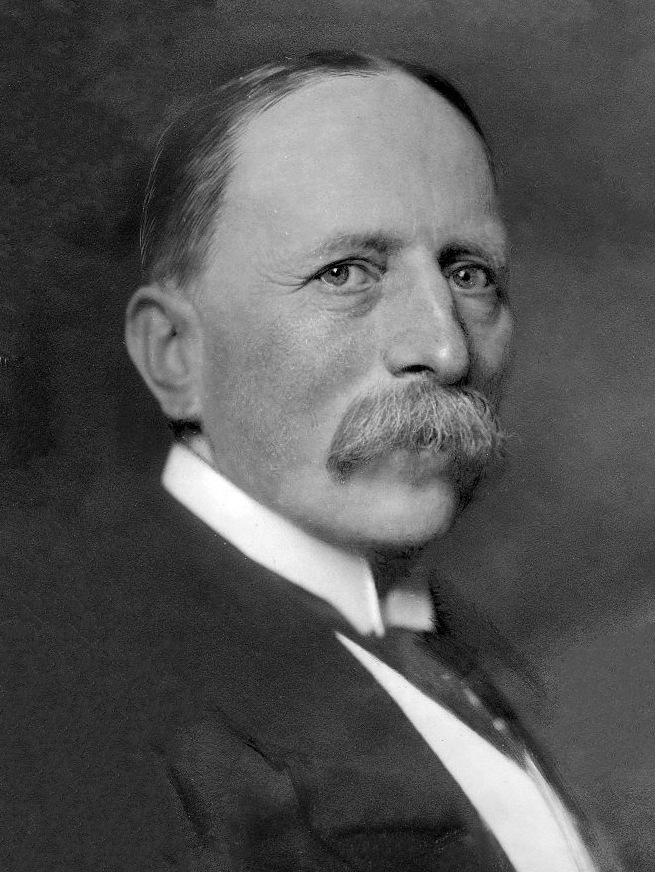
Friedrich Schmidt-Ott c. 1917

Friedrich Gustav Adolf Eduard Ludwig Schmidt-Ott (until 1920 his surname was Schmidt) (4 June 1860, in Potsdam – 28 April 1956, in Berlin) was a German lawyer, scientific organizer, and science policymaker. He was the Prussian Minister of Culture, president of the Emergency Association of German Science, on the advisory boards of the Kaiser Wilhelm Society and its institutes, and chairman of the Donor Federation of the Emergency Association of German Science.

== Education ==
Schmidt-Ott had a degree in law.

== Career ==
From 1888, Schmidt-Ott was at the Preußisches Kultusministerium (PrKM, Prussian Culture Ministry), officially the Preußisches Ministerium für Wissenschaft, Kunst und Volksbildung Prussian Ministry of Science, Arts, and Culture. For many years, he was assistant to Friedrich Althoff. From 1903, Schmidt-Ott was head of the arts division, and from 1917, he was the Preußischen Kultusminister (Prussian Minister of Culture), which included responsibility for education.

In 1895 he married Margaretha "Meta" Luise Ott (Ott-Däniker) (July 2, 1869 – 1963). Since the time of his silver wedding anniversary in 1920, in honor of his wife he began calling himself Friedrich Schmidt-Ott instead of Friedrich Schmidt.

From 1911 to 1919, Schmidt-Ott was on the boards of trustees of all the institutes of the Kaiser-Wilhelm Gesellschaft (KWG, Kaiser Wilhelm Society). From 1920 to 1937, Schmidt-Ott was second vice-president (practically, acting vice president) of the KWG and then honorary member of the supervisory board of the society.

The Notgemeinschaft der Deutschen Wissenschaft (NG, Emergency Association of German Science) was founded on 30 October 1920 on the initiative of leading members of the Preußischen Akademie der Wissenschaften (PAW, Prussian Academy of Sciences.) – Fritz Haber, Max Planck, and Ernst von Harnack – and the former Preußischen Kultusminister Friedrich Schmidt-Ott. The physicist Heinrich Konen, due to his relationship with Schmidt-Ott, was involved in the founding and organization, and he became a longstanding member of its main committee. Members of the NG included all German universities, all polytechnics (Technische Hochschulen), the five scientific academies, and the Kaiser-Wilhelm Gesellschaft. From 1920 to 1934 Schmidt-Ott was president of the NG, when he was then succeeded by Johannes Stark, who was a supporter of the deutsche Physik movement. When Minister Bernhard Rust of the Reichserziehungsministerium (REM, Reich Ministry of Education) fired Schmidt-Ott from the presidency of the NG, he told Schmidt-Ott it was on the personal order of Adolf Hitler.

From 1934 to 1945, Schmidt-Ott was chairman of the Stifterverband der Notgemeinschaft der Deutschen Wissenschaft (Donor Federation of the Emergency Association of German Science), founded in 1920 to collect donations for the Notgemeinschaft der Deutschen Wissenschaft.

After WW2 Schmidt-Ott became honorary president of the newly established Deutschen Forschungsgemeinschaft.

== Honors ==
- 1929 Harnack Medal of the Kaiser-Wilhelm Gesellschaft
- 1930: Adlerschild des Deutschen Reiches
- 1930: Honorary doctor of the Universität Wien
- 1933: Honorary member of the Academy of Sciences Leopoldina
- 1951: Commander's Cross of the Federal Republic of Germany
- 1960: Change of the name of the former Kaiser-Wilhelm-Straße in Berlin-Steglitz to Schmidt-Ott-Straße

== Bibliography ==
- Hentschel, Klaus (Editor) and Ann M. Hentschel (Editorial Assistant and Translator) Physics and National Socialism: An Anthology of Primary Sources (Birkhäuser, 1996)
