= Donor Federation of the Emergency Association of German Science =

The Stifterverband der Notgemeinschaft der Deutschen Wissenschaft (Donor Federation of the Emergency Association of German Science) was founded on 14 December 1920 to collect donations for the Notgemeinschaft der Deutschen Wissenschaft through its representatives in industry or through political influence. From 1920 to 1945, R. Fellinger of Siemens was the managing director. Contributions to the Federation were small compared to grants from the government, especially because of competing organizations, such as Helmholtz-Gesellschaft (today, the Helmholtz Association of German Research Centres), founded by Albert Vögler in 1920, and the Fördergesellschaft der Deutschen Industrie (Society for the Advancement of German Industry).

== Chairmen ==
- 1920–1934: Carl Friedrich von Siemens
- 1934–1935: Carl Duisberg
- 1935–1945: Friedrich Schmidt-Ott

== Bibliography ==
- Hentschel, Klaus (Editor) and Ann M. Hentschel (Editorial Assistant and Translator) Physics and National Socialism: An Anthology of Primary Sources (Birkhäuser, 1996)
