= Heinrich Konen =

German physicist (1874–1948)

Heinrich Matthias Konen
- Konen at the Fourth Conference International Union for Cooperation in Solar Research at Mount Wilson Observatory, 1910
- Born: 16 September 1874; Cologne, Germany
- Died: 31 December 1948 (aged 74); Bad Godesberg, Germany
- Education: University of Bonn

Heinrich Matthias Konen (16 September 1874 – 31 December 1948) was a German physicist who specialized in spectroscopy. He was a founder and organizer of the Emergency Association of German Science, and he was a member of the "Senate" of the Kaiser Wilhelm Society, the Reich Physical and Technical Institute, and the Reich Chemical and Technical Institute. When he was forced out of academia in 1933 due to his opposition to National Socialism, he became an advisor in the industrial sector, especially the Troisdorf Works. After World War II, Konen became rector of University of Bonn and then headed the Culture Ministry of North Rhine-Westphalia.

== Early life and education ==
Heinrich Konen was born 16 September 1874 in Cologne, Germany. From 1893 to 1898, Konen studied at the University of Bonn. He was awarded his doctorate there in 1897.

== Career ==
From 1899, Konen was a teaching assistant at University of Bonn. From 1902, he was a Privatdozent there, as well as a part-time teacher at the Bonn Gymnasium (secondary school).

Konen was an ausserordentlicher Professor of theoretical physics at University of Münster from 1905 to 1912, and from 1919 to 1920 he was an ordentlicher Professor there. In 1920, due to his relationship with Friedrich Schmidt-Ott, Konen was involved in the founding and organization of the Notgemeinschaft der Deutschen Wissenschaft (NG, Emergency Association of German Science) and he became a longstanding member of its main committee. In 1920, he also succeeded Heinrich Kayser as ordentlicher Professor at the University of Bonn. From 1927 to 1929, he additionally was president of the German Physical Society. Konen's opposition to National Socialism resulted in his forced retirement from academia in 1933, the year Adolf Hitler came to power in Germany. Also until 1933, he was on the supervisory board of the Kaiser Wilhelm Society, an influential member of the board of trustees of the Physikalisch-Technische Reichsanstalt (PTR, Reich Physical and Technical Institute – today, the Physikalisch-Technische Bundesanstalt), on the board of trustees of the Chemisch-Technische Reichsanstalt (CTR, Reich Chemical and Technical Institute), and on the board of the Deutsches Museum in Munich. When Konen left academia, he became an advisor in industry, especially for Troisdorfer Werke (Dynamit Nobel AG, a chemical and weapons company whose headquarters was in Troisdorf).

At University of Bonn, Konen was the Doktorvater (doctoral advisor) to Wolfgang Finkelnburg, who received his doctorate in 1928. Finkelnburg would go on to play a major role in the campaign against and political victory over the Deutsche Physik movement, as the organizer of the Münchner Religionsgespräche, known as the “Munich Synod.”

After 1945, Konen became rector of University of Bonn and then headed the Culture Ministry of North Rhine-Westphalia. In 1949, after formation of the Bundesrepublik Deutschland, Konen used his position in the Culture Ministry to re-found the Notgemeinschaft der Deutschen Wissenschaft, which had become inactive in 1945. He died 31 December 1948 in Bad Godesberg, Germany.

== Books by Konen ==
- Heinrich Konen Einführung in die theoretische Optik (Teubner, 1907)
- Heinrich Konen Reisebilder von einer Studienreise durch Sternwarten und Laboratorien der Vereinigten Staaten (Bachem, 1912)
- Heinrich Konen Das leuchten der gase und dampfe mit besonderer berucksichtigung der gesetzmassigkeiten in Spektren (Friedr. Vieweg & Sohn, 1913)
- Heinrich Mathias Konen Das Leuchten der Gase und Dämpfe (F. Vieweg & Sohn, 1913)
- Heinrich Konen, editor Geometrische Optik. Optische Konstante. Optische Instrumente, Handbuch der Physik - Geiger/Scheel - Volume 18 (Springer, 1927)
- H. Kayser and H. Konen Handbuch der Spectroscopie - Eight Volumes (Hirzel, 1930)
- Heinrich Konen Physikalische Plaudereien, Gegenwartsprobleme und ihre technische Bedeutung (Verlag der Buchgemeinde, 1937 & 1941)
