= Theanolte Bähnisch =

German lawyer and politician

Dorothea Nolte (Theanolte Bähnisch, her married name), (born 25 April 1899 in Beuthen; died 9 July 1973 in Hanover) was a German lawyer, administrative officer and politician (SPD). After attending school, she studied law at the Westfälische Wilhelms-Universität in Münster. Together with her husband, she opened a law firm in Berlin in 1933 and then sat down as a lawyer for the politically persecuted, including for the photographer Lotte Jacobi. Bähnisch was the president of the Regierungsbezirk Hannover from 1946 to 1959, thus, she was the first woman in Germany, who held the office of a government president.
