= Joseph Langtry =

Royal Navy officer (1805–1862)

Joseph M. LANGTRY R.N.
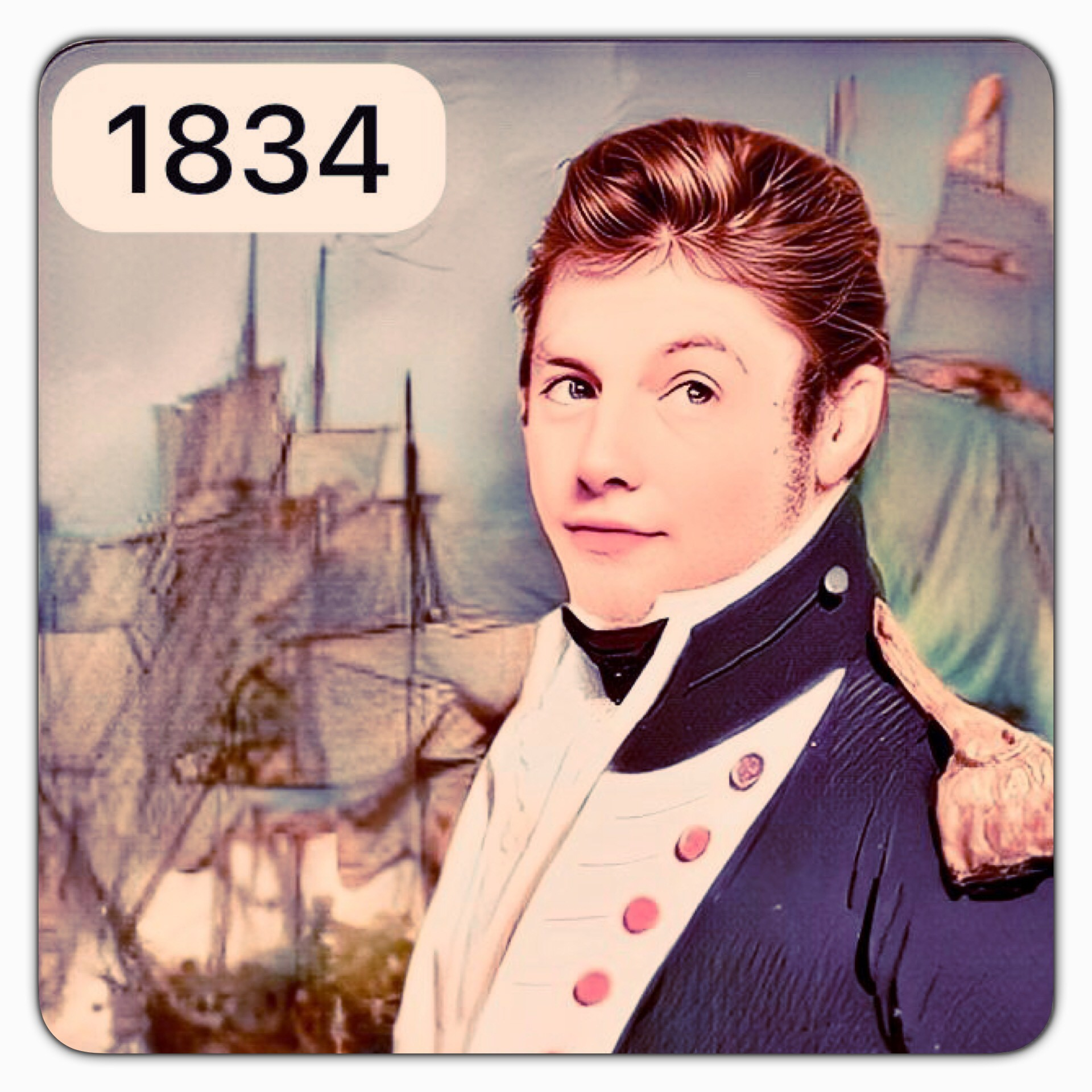
- Langtry in 1834
- Born: Joseph Miller LANGTRY; 1 May 1805 (Aldingbourne, Sussex, England death_date = 14 February 1862 (aged 56)
- Died: Southampton, Hampshire, England
- Military career
- Allegiance: United Kingdom
- Branch: Royal Navy
- Rank: Retired Captain
- Commands: R.N. Commander Retired Captain

Joseph Miller Langtry (1 May 1805 – 14 February 1862) was an officer of the Royal Navy. He rose to be a commander during his career, and was promoted to retired captain in 1859. Langtry was born at Aldingbourne, Sussex in 1805, the third son of Joseph Langtry. He entered the Royal Naval Academy, leaving it as a lieutenant on 22 October 1827. He joined HMS Lyra for service off Lisbon, and by 10 October 1829 had joined HMS Ramillies. He moved to HMS Talavera on 19 November 1830, and then served in the coast guard for a period between 5 April 1831 and March 1833. He was lieutenant aboard HMS Pylades from 7 August 1835, and from 25 March 1836 until October 1836, was lieutenant aboard HMS Hercules.

Langtry was next lieutenant aboard HMS Donegal, the flagship of Rear-Admiral John Ommanney from 2 October 1837, and then flag-lieutenant to Ommanney aboard HMS Britannia from 13 October 1840. From 23 September 1841 until December 1841 Langtry was lieutenant aboard HMS Powerful. He was promoted to commander on 4 January 1842, and from 30 June 1856 he was commander, and second in command, of HMS Wellesley, commanded by George Goldsmith. Langtry was promoted to the rank of captain, retired, on 11 December 1859. He died in Southampton, Hampshire on 14 February 1862.
