= Henry V. M. Langtry =

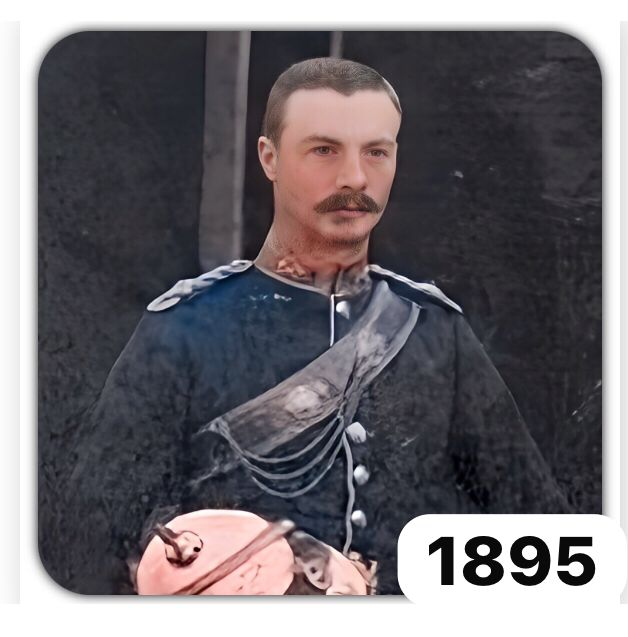
- Langtry in 1895
- Born: Henry Vivian Montague Langtry; 12 November 1869; Cheltenham, Gloucester, England
- Died: 22 August 1935 (aged 65); Southampton, England
- Military career
- Allegiance: United Kingdom
- Branch: British Indian Army
- Rank: Lieutenant-Colonel
- Commands: Queen's Royal West Surrey Regiment; Burma Military Police

Lieutenant-Colonel Henry Vivian Montague Langtry (12 November 1869 – 22 August 1935) was a British military officer.

Langtry was originally commissioned, on 21 January 1888 (at age 19) as a Second Lieutenant in the infantry of the 3rd Battalion, The Queen's (Royal West Surrey Regiment). On 26 October 1889, Langtry was promoted to Lieutenant.

Langtry was then commissioned, on 4 February 1891, into a Line Battalion, as a Second Lieutenant again. He first arrived in India 7 December 1891.

On 21 May 1892, he was appointed to the Indian Staff Corps, and promoted to Lieutenant again.

He was first appointed as an assistant commandant, Burma Military Police, May 1895 to May 1900.

On 10 July 1901, Langtry was promoted to Captain.

On 30 July 1901 he was appointed to a civil position in Burma as an Assistant Commissioner, Burma Commission.

Langtry was promoted to Major on 4 February 1909.

Appointed to the Supernumerary List 30 July 1911, after ten years in civil employment.

In January 1917 he was appointed Deputy Commissioner 2nd grade

He was promoted to lieutenant colonel on 4 February 1917.

He was appointed Adjutant of the Burma Military Police in March 1918.

On 12 May 1925, after a long career, Langtry retired to Hampshire, where he remained until his death in Southampton in 1935. His father was Col. Henry Langtry and mother Sofia Hailes, daughter of Captain Hailes of the 10th Bengal Cavalry.
