= Henry Langtry =

Henry Langtry (1841 – 1912) was a British Army officer.

Langtry's military career started as a 2nd lieutenant in the Antrim Militia, 1st Royal Artillery on 28 July 1856. He was promoted to 1st lieutenant on 28 March 1859. He then served as cornet in the 3rd Regiment of Dragoon Guards (Prince of Wales) from 16 August 1861. He was a lieutenant with the 3rd Dragoon Guards in the Abyssinian campaign in 1868, and was present at the storming and capture of Magdala.

Langtry served with the 15th Hussars in the Kandahar Column in the Afghan war of 1878–80, including the advance to Khelat-i-Ghilzai; commanded a detached squadron of his regiment at the affair in the Ghlo Pass, 4 January 1879; also served with the Thull-Chotiali Field Force under Brigadier General Michael Biddulph, and accompanied Major General Robert Phayre in his march towards Kandahar. He was also present in the First Boer War of 1881 with the 15th Hussars.

By 1883 he was commanding officer of the 8th Hussars and became Brevet Colonel in 1885.

Langtry died in 1912 in St Marylebone, London. He was the grandson of George Langtry, shipping merchant of Belfast, Co. Antrim (1764–1846). His parents were Elizabeth and Richard Langtry. The Langtry family homes included Fortwilliam in Belfast and Drumadarragh House. His son, Henry V. M. Langtry, was also in the army. Henry Langtry's cousin, Edward Langtry, married Emilie Charlotte Le Breton in 1874; she later became actress Lillie Langtry.
