= Theodosius Harnack =

Baltic German theologian (1817–1889)

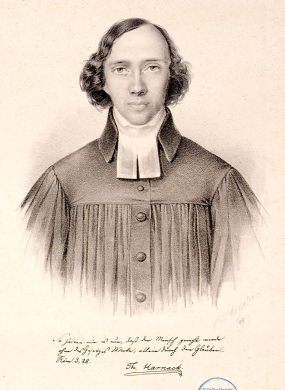
Theodosius Harnack; lithograph by Georg Friedrich Schlater

Theodosius Andreas Harnack (Russian: Феодосий Карлович Гарнак, romanized: Feodosij Karlovič Garnak; 3 January [O.S. 22 December 1816] 1817, St. Petersburg – 23 September [O.S. 11] 1889, Dorpat (now Tartu)) was a Baltic German theologian.

A professor of Divinity, he started his career as a Privatdozent for church history and homiletics at the Imperial University of Dorpat (in what is today Tartu, Estonia) in 1843, he was further appointed university preacher in 1847. Since 1848 he held an ordinary chair (tenure) as professor for practical and systematic theology. Between 1853 and 1866 Harnack was professor at Frederick Alexander University (merged in the University of Erlangen-Nuremberg since 1961) in Erlangen, Bavaria, German Confederation (now Germany).

Harnack was a staunch Lutheran and a prolific writer on theological subjects; his chief field of work was practical theology, and his important book on that subject summing up his long experience and teaching appeared at Erlangen (1877–1878, 2 vols.). The liturgy of the then Lutheran church in Russia has, since 1898, been based on his Liturgische Formulare (1872).

His twin sons were the German theologian Adolf von Harnack (1851–1930) and mathematician Carl Gustav Axel Harnack (1851–1888). His other two sons were also successful scientists, with the pharmacology and physiological chemistry professor Erich Harnack (1853–1914) and the history of literature professor Otto Harnack (1857–1914), father of Arvid Harnack and Falk Harnack.

== Books by Theodosius Harnack ==
- Der christliche Gemeindegottesdienst im apostolischen und altkatholischen Zeitaltern (Erlangen, 1854)
- Tabellarische Uebersicht der Geschichte der Liturgie der christlichen Hauptgottesdienstes (Erlangen, 1858)
- Die lutherische Kirche Livlands und die herrnhutische Brüdergemeinde (Erlangen, 1860)
- Luthers Theologie: mit besonderer Beziehung auf seine Versöhnungs- und Erlösungslehre (2 vols., Erlangen, 1862, 1886)
- Praktische Theologie (4 vols., Erlangen, 1877-8)
- Ueber den Kanon und die Inspiration der Heiligen Schrift: ein Wort zum Frieden (Erlangen, 1885)

== Sources ==
- die erfurt enzyklopädie
- Alexander von Oettingen (1905). "Harnack, Theodosius" . Allgemeine Deutsche Biographie (in German). Vol. 50. Leipzig: Duncker & Humblot. pp. 8–16.
- Martin Doerne (1966). "Harnack, Theodosius Andreas". Neue Deutsche Biographie (in German). Vol. 7. Berlin: Duncker & Humblot. pp. 690–691. (full text online).
- Bernd Schröder, „Die Wissenschaft der sich selbst erbauenden Kirche – Theodosius Harnack“, in: Geschichte der Praktischen Theologie. Dargestellt anhand ihrer Klassiker, Christian Grethlein and Michael Meyer-Blanck (eds.), Leipzig: Evangelische Verlags-Anstalt, 2000, ISBN 3-374-01767-3, pp. 151–206.
