= Harvick =

Harvick is a surname. Notable people with the surname include:

- DeLana Harvick (born 1973), former co-owner and manager of Kevin Harvick Incorporated and Kevin Harvick's wife
- Kevin Harvick (born 1975), American professional stock car racing driver
- Kerry Harvick (born 1974), American country music artist
