= Langtree (disambiguation) =

Langtree may refer to:

== Places ==
in England

- Langtree, Devon
- Langtree, an area within the village of Standish, Greater Manchester
- Langtree (hundred), an ancient subdivision of Oxfordshire

in Australia

- Langtree, New South Wales
  - Langtree Nature Reserve in New South Wales
- Langtree stud farm, Benalla, Victoria

== Education establishments ==
- Langtree Elementary School in Trenton, New Jersey, USA
- Langtree School in Woodcote, Oxfordshire (near to Reading, Berkshire), England

== Businesses ==
- Langtree Group, a property investment and real estate development firm in Haydock, St Helens, Merseyside, England

== Christian church ==
- Langtree, a Church of England ministry in Oxfordshire, England

== People ==
- Andrew Langtree, (1977-), British stage and screen actor
- Charles Langtree, (deceased), Australian rules footballer

== See also ==
- Langtry (disambiguation)
