= James I. Langtry =

British government official (1939–2021)

James Ian Langtry (2 January 1939 – 8 April 2021) was a British government official and educator.

== Life and career ==
James Ian Langtry the son of Reverend H. J. Langtry and I. M. Langtry (née Eagleson). In 1959, he married Eileen Roberta Beatrice (née Nesbitt) (died 1999). He was educated at Coleraine Academical Institution; Queen’s University, Belfast (Sullivan School.; BSc 1st Class, Physics).

Langtry was Assistant Master, Bangor Grammar School (1960–1961); Lecturer, Belfast College of Technology (1961–1966); Assistant Director of Examinations/Recruitment, Civil Service Commission (1966–1970); Principal, Department of Education and Science (1970–1976), Assistant Secretary (1976–1982); Under Secretary (1982–1987); Under Secretary, DHSS (1987–1988).

James I. Langtry died on 8 April 2021, at the age of 82.
