= John Langtry =

John Langtry (1834–1906), M.A., D.C.L. Renowned member of the Anglican Church in Canada and prolific religious writer.

In 1867, Langtry founded the Bishop Strachan School for Girls in Toronto, Ontario, Canada.

== Publications ==
- The Struggle for Life: Higher Criticism Criticised (1905)
- Presbyterianism, A Lecture
- Catholic versus Roman : or, Some of the fundamental points of difference between the Catholic Church and the Roman Church, in ten lectures, delivered in St. Luke's Church, Toronto, in 1885 (1886)
- History of the Church in eastern Canada and Newfoundland (1892)
- The Church's Warfare: a sermon preached before the Synod of the Diocese of Toronto, in St. James' Cathedral, on Tuesday, the 14th of June, 1892
