= Harnack's principle =

Theorem on the convergence of harmonic functions

In the mathematical field of partial differential equations, Harnack's principle or Harnack's theorem is a corollary of Harnack's inequality which deals with the convergence of sequences of harmonic functions.

Given a sequence of harmonic functions u_{1}, u_{2}, ... on an open connected subset G of the Euclidean space R^{n}, which are pointwise monotonically nondecreasing in the sense that

$$u_1(x) \le u_2(x) \le \dots$$

for every point x of G, then the limit

$$\lim_{n\to\infty}u_n(x)$$

automatically exists in the extended real number line for every x. Harnack's theorem says that the limit either is infinite at every point of G or it is finite at every point of G. In the latter case, the convergence is uniform on compact sets and the limit is a harmonic function on G.

The theorem is a corollary of Harnack's inequality. If u_{n}(y) is a Cauchy sequence for any particular value of y, then the Harnack inequality applied to the harmonic function u_{m} − u_{n} implies, for an arbitrary compact set D containing y, that sup_{D} |u_{m} − u_{n}| is arbitrarily small for sufficiently large m and n. This is exactly the definition of uniform convergence on compact sets. In words, the Harnack inequality is a tool which directly propagates the Cauchy property of a sequence of harmonic functions at a single point to the Cauchy property at all points.

Having established uniform convergence on compact sets, the harmonicity of the limit is an immediate corollary of the fact that the mean value property (automatically preserved by uniform convergence) fully characterizes harmonic functions among continuous functions.

The proof of uniform convergence on compact sets holds equally well for any linear second-order elliptic partial differential equation, provided that it is linear so that u_{m} − u_{n} solves the same equation. The only difference is that the more general Harnack inequality holding for solutions of second-order elliptic PDE must be used, rather than that only for harmonic functions. Having established uniform convergence on compact sets, the mean value property is not available in this more general setting, and so the proof of convergence to a new solution must instead make use of other tools, such as the Schauder estimates.
