= Agnes von Zahn-Harnack =

German teacher, writer and women's rights activist

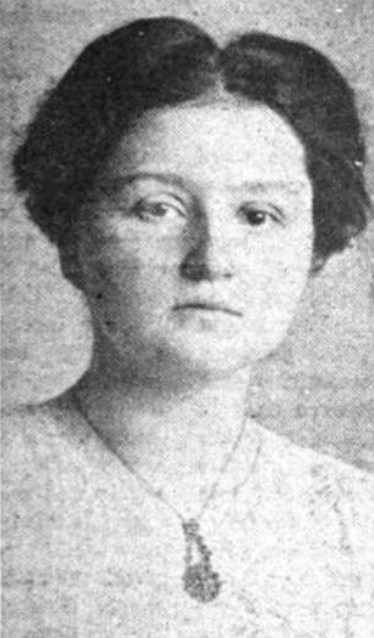
- Agnes von Harnack, from a 1916 publication
- Born: 19 June 1884; Gießen, German Empire
- Died: 22 May 1950 (aged 65); Berlin, Germany
- Occupations: Teacher; Writer; Women's rights activist
- Spouse: Karl von Zahn
- Father: Adolf von Harnack

Agnes von Zahn-Harnack (19 June, 1884, Gießen – 22 May 1950, Berlin) was a German teacher, writer and women's rights activist.

== Early life ==
She was the daughter of the theologian Adolf von Harnack (1851–1930) and Amalie Thiersch (1858–1937). She was born Agnes Harnack as it was only in 1914 that her father was awarded the hereditary title of nobility. She attended two girls' high schools in Berlin-Charlottenburg between 1890 and 1900. She earned a doctorate in 1912 with a thesis on German romanticism.

== Career ==
As a young woman, von Harnack was principal of a girls' high school. She wrote about German women in wartime for Current History in 1916.

Zahn-Harnack was chairwoman of the Bund Deutscher Frauenvereine from 1931 to its dissolution in 1933, when they chose to break the organisation up rather than continue under the supervision of the Nazi regime.

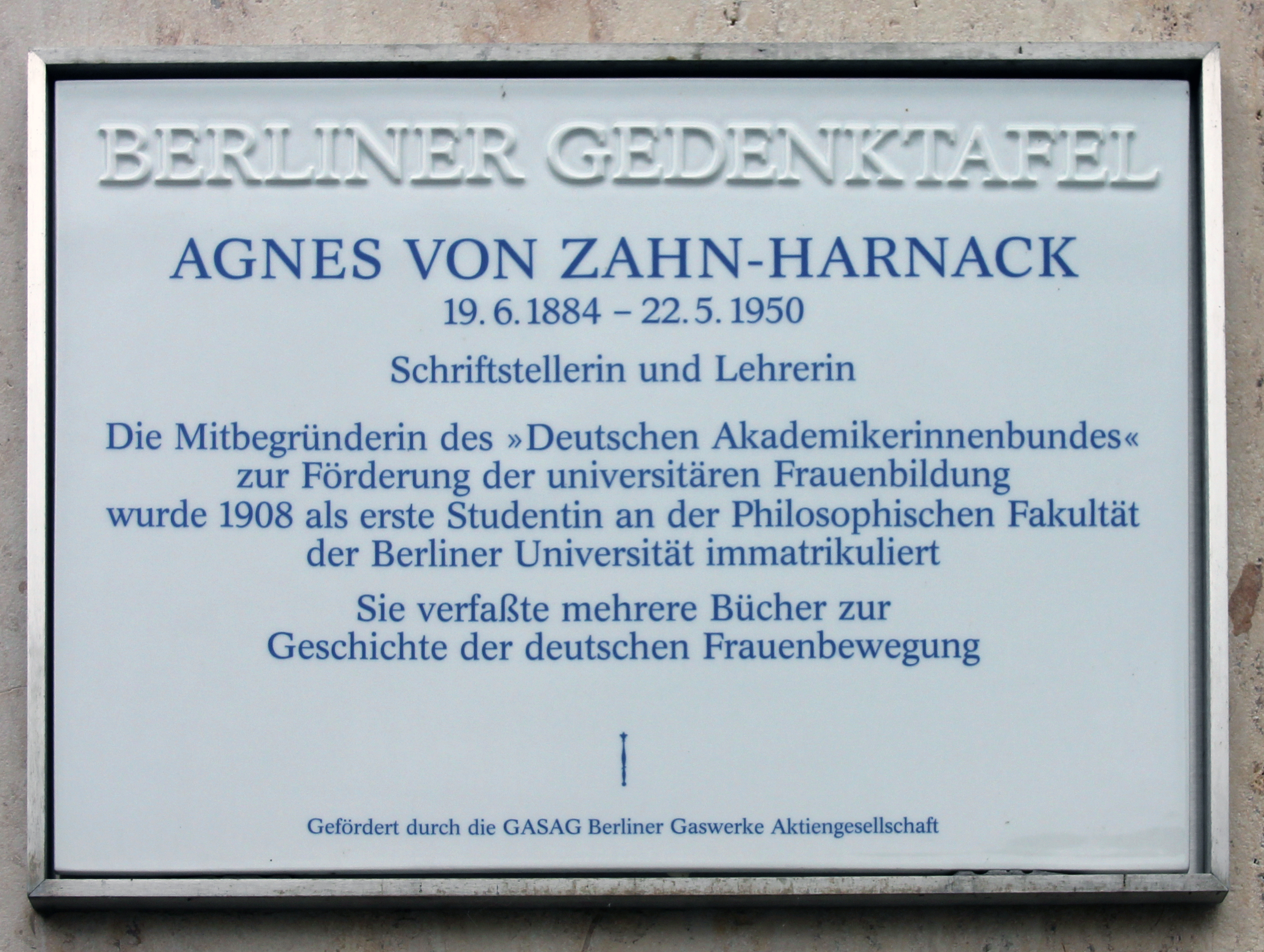
Berlin memorial plaque for Agnes von Zahn-Harnack

== Personal life ==
On 8 December 1919, Zahn-Harnack married Karl von Zahn (1877-1944) in Berlin, Germany. Zahn-Harnack's husband was a civil servant in the Weimar Republic's Ministry of the Interior.
