= Adolf von Harnack =

Baltic German theologian and church historian (1851–1930)

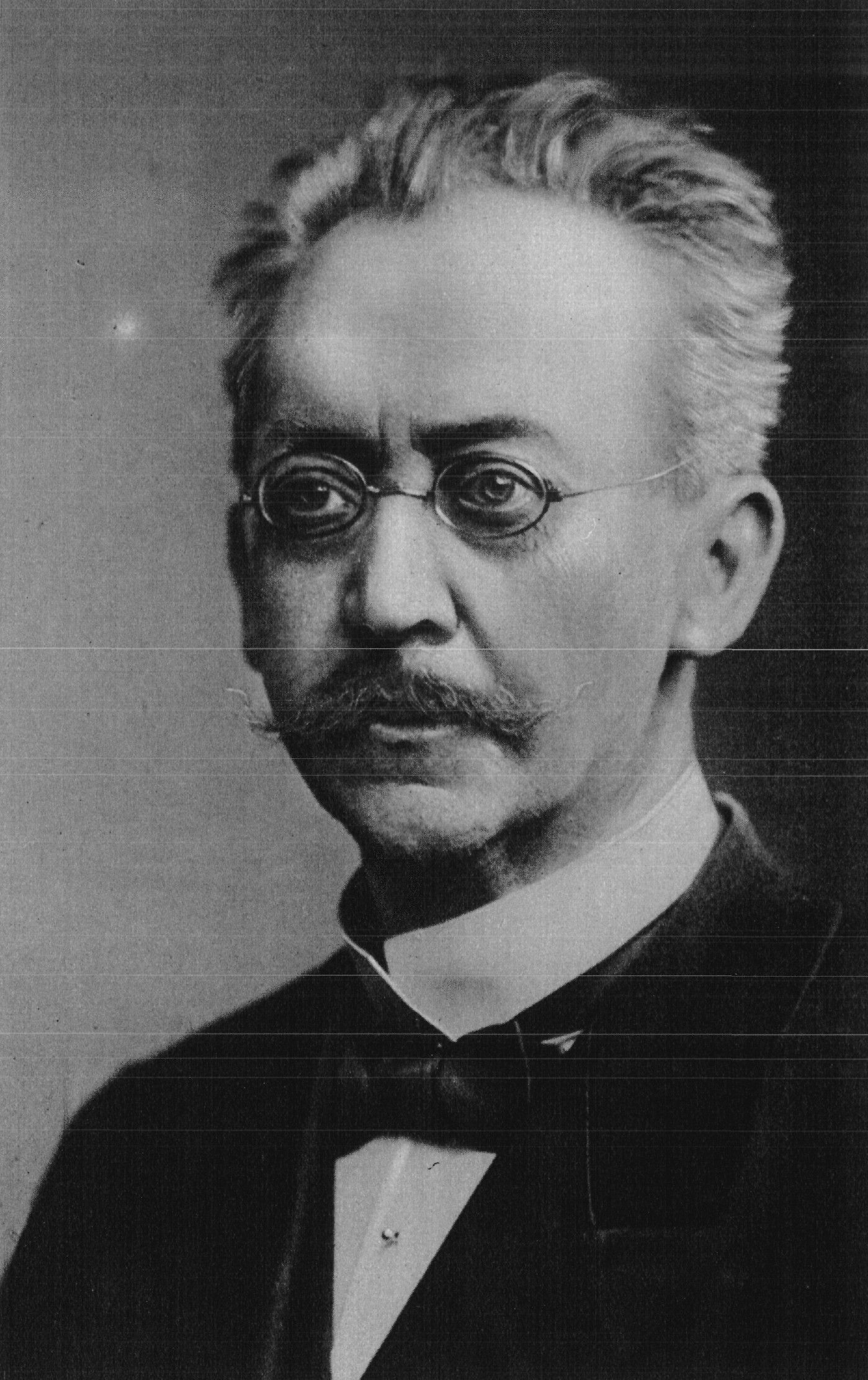
- Born: Carl Gustav Adolf Harnack; 7 May [O.S. 25 April] 1851; Dorpat, Kreis Dorpat, Governorate of Livonia, Russian Empire (present-day Tartu, Tartu County, Estonia)
- Died: 10 June 1930 (aged 79); Heidelberg, Republic of Baden, Weimar Republic
- Other name: Adolf Harnack
- Occupations: Theologian, church historian
- Spouse: Amalie Thiersch (1858–1937)
- Children: 7, including Agnus and Ernst
- Relatives: Theodosius Harnack (father); Axel (brother); Arvid Harnack (nephew)

Education
- Education: Imperial University of Dorpat; University of Erlangen; University of Leipzig

Philosophical work
- Institutions: University of Leipzig (1874–1879); University of Giessen (1879–1886); University of Marburg (1886–1888); University of Berlin (1888–1921)
- Notable students: Karl Barth; Wilhelm Bousset; William Adams Brown; Adolf Keller; Rudolf Handmann; Emanuel Hirsch; William Miller Macmillan; Arthur Cushman McGiffert; Friedrich Loofs; Wilhelm Pauck; Friedrich Rittelmeyer; Carl Schmidt (Coptologist); Nathaniel Schmidt; Elisabeth Schmitz; Heinrich Scholz; Henry Nelson Wieman
- Notable works: The Essence of Christianity (Das Wesen des Christentums); The History of Dogma; The History of Ancient Christian Literature; The Mission and Expansion of Christianity in the First Three Centuries

Carl Gustav Adolf von Harnack (born Harnack; 7 May 1851 – 10 June 1930) was a Baltic German Lutheran theologian and prominent church historian. He produced many religious publications from 1873 to 1912 (in which he is sometimes credited as Adolf Harnack). He was ennobled (with the addition of von to his name) in 1914.

Harnack traced the influence of Hellenistic philosophy on early Christian writings and called on Christians to question the authenticity of doctrines that arose in the early Christian church. He rejected the historicity of the Gospel of John in favor of the Synoptic Gospels, criticized the Apostles' Creed, and promoted the Social Gospel.

In the 19th century, higher criticism flourished in Germany, establishing the historical-critical method as an academic standard for interpreting the Bible and understanding the historical Jesus. Harnack's work is part of a reaction to Tübingen, and represents a reappraisal of tradition.

Besides his theological activities, Harnack was a distinguished organizer of sciences. He played an important role in the foundation of the Kaiser Wilhelm Gesellschaft and became its first president.

== Biography ==
He was born at Dorpat (today Tartu) in Livonia (then a province of Russia, now in Estonia) where his father, Theodosius Harnack, held a professorship of pastoral theology. He was the twin brother of Carl Gustav Axel Harnack.

He married Amalie Thiersch on 27 December 1879. Their daughter Agnes von Zahn-Harnack became an activist in the Women's movement.

Harnack studied at the local Imperial University of Dorpat (1869–72) and at the University of Leipzig, where he took his degree; soon afterwards, in 1874, he began lecturing as a Privatdozent. These lectures, which dealt with such special subjects as Gnosticism and the Apocalypse, attracted considerable attention, and in 1876 he was appointed professor extraordinarius. In the same year he began the publication, in conjunction with Oscar Leopold von Gebhardt and Theodor Zahn, of an edition of the works of the Apostolic Fathers, Patrum apostolicorum opera, a smaller edition of which appeared in 1877.

In 1879 he was called to the University of Giessen as professor ordinarius of church history. There he collaborated with Gebhardt in Texte und Untersuchungen zur Geschichte der altchristlichen Litteratur (1882 sqq.), an irregular periodical, containing only essays in New Testament and patristic fields. In 1881 he published a work on monasticism, Das Mönchtum – seine Ideale und seine Geschichte (5th ed., 1900; English translation, 1901), and became joint editor with Emil Schürer of the Theologische Literaturzeitung.

In 1885 he published the first volume of his Lehrbuch der Dogmengeschichte (3rd ed. in three volumes, 1894–1898; English translation in seven volumes, 1894–1899). In this work Harnack traced the rise of dogma, which he understood as the authoritative doctrinal system of the church and its development from the 4th century down to the Protestant Reformation. He considered that from its earliest origins, Christian faith and Greek philosophy were so closely intermingled that the resultant system included many beliefs and practices that were not authentically Christian. Therefore, Protestants are not only free, but bound, to criticize it; Protestantism could be understood as a rejection of this dogma and a return to the pure faith that characterized the original church. An abridgment of this appeared in 1889 with the title Grundriss der Dogmengeschichte (3rd ed., 1898).

In 1886 Harnack was called to the University of Marburg and in 1888, in spite of violent opposition from the conservative church authorities, to Berlin. In 1890 he became a member of the Academy of Sciences. In Berlin, somewhat against his will, he was drawn into a controversy on the Apostles' Creed, in which the partisan antagonisms within the Prussian Church had found expression. Harnack's view was that the creed contains both too much and too little to be a satisfactory test for candidates for ordination; he preferred a briefer declaration of faith which could be rigorously applied to all (cf. his Das Apostolische Glaubensbekenntnis. Ein geschichtlicher Bericht nebst einer Einleitung und einem Nachwort, 1892).

In Berlin, Harnack continued writing. In 1893 he published a history of early Christian literature down to Eusebius of Caesarea, Geschichte der altkirchlichen Literatur bis Eusebius (part 2 of vol. 5., 1897); and in his popular lectures, Das Wesen des Christentums appeared in 1900 (5th ed., 1901; English translation, What is Christianity? 1901). One of his later historical works, Die Mission und Ausbreitung des Christentums in den ersten drei Jahrhunderten (1902; English translation, The Mission and Expansion of Christianity in the First Three Centuries, in two volumes, 1904–1905), was followed by some important New Testament studies (Beitrage zur Einleitung in das neue Testament, 1906 sqq.; Engl. trans.: Luke the Physician, 1907; The Sayings of Jesus, 1908).

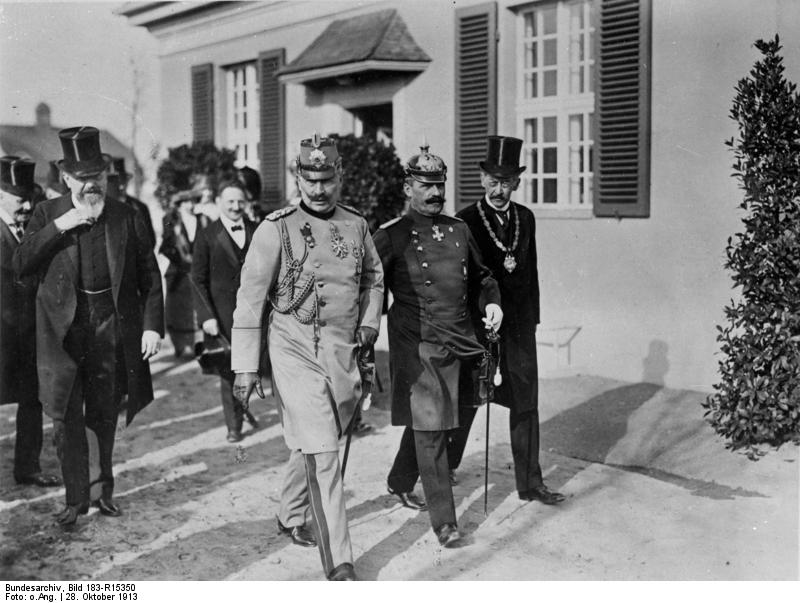
Adolf von Harnack (right) close to Kaiser Wilhelm II on the occasion of the inauguration of a new Kaiser-Wilhelm-Institut (1913).

Harnack was one of the most prolific and stimulating of modern critical scholars, and brought up in his "Seminar" a whole generation of teachers who carried his ideas and methods throughout the whole of Germany and beyond.

From 1905 to 1921, Harnack was the General Director of the Royal Library at Berlin (from 1918 called the Prussian State Library).

Like many liberal professors in Germany, Harnack welcomed World War I in 1914, and signed a public statement endorsing Germany's war-aims (the Manifesto of the Ninety-Three). It was this statement, with his teacher Harnack's signature on it, that Karl Barth cited as a major impetus for his rejection of liberal theology.

Harnack was one of the moving spirits in the foundation, in 1911, of the Kaiser Wilhelm Gesellschaft (KWG), and became its first President. The Society's activities were much constrained by the First World War, but in the Weimar Republic period Harnack guided it to be a major vehicle for overcoming the isolation of German academics felt as a result of the war and its aftermath. The society's flagship conference centre in Berlin, the Harnack House, which opened in 1929, was named in his honour. After a long period in U.S. Army hands after World War II it has now resumed the role Harnack envisaged, as a centre for international intellectual life in the German capital, under the management of the KWG's successor organisation, the Max Planck Gesellschaft.

== Biblical criticism and theology ==
Among the distinctive characteristics of Harnack's work were his insistence on absolute freedom in the study of church history and the New Testament (i.e. there were no taboo areas of research that could not be critically examined); his distrust of speculative theology, whether orthodox or liberal; and his interest in practical Christianity as a religious life and not a system of theology. Some of his addresses on social matters were published under the heading "Essays on the Social Gospel" (1907).

Harnack regarded all four gospels to be "not altogether useless as sources of history", but still, "not written with the simple object of giving the facts as they were; they are books composed for the work of evangelisation."

Harnack's suggested view on Biblical miracles was nuanced, and distinguished between certain types thusly:

"In the fourth place, and lastly, although the order of Nature be inviolable, we are not yet by any means acquainted with all the forces working in it and acting reciprocally with other forces. Our acquaintance even with the forces inherent in matter, and with the field of their action, is incomplete; while of psychic forces we know very much less. We see that a strong will and a firm faith exert an influence upon the life of the body, and produce phenomena which strike us as marvellous. Who is there up to now that has set any sure bounds to the province of the possible and the actual? No one. Who can say how far the influence of soul upon soul and of soul upon body reaches ? No one. Who can still maintain that any extraordinary phenomenon that may appear in this domain is entirely based on error and delusion ? Miracles, it is true, do not happen; but of the marvellous and the inexplicable there is plenty. In our present state of knowledge we have become more careful, more hesitating in our judgment, in regard to the stories of the miraculous which we have received from antiquity. That the earth in its course stood still; that a she-ass spoke; that a storm was quieted by a word, we do not believe, and we shall never again believe; but that the lame walked, the blind saw, and the deaf heard, will not be so summarily dismissed as an illusion."

== Bibliography ==
- Kurt Nowak et al., (eds.), Adolf von Harnack. Christentum, Wissenschaft und Gesellschaft, Göttingen: Vandenhoeck & Ruprecht, 2003, ISBN 3-525-35854-7 is the best recent assessment of Harnack and his impact from a variety of perspectives.

=== Selected works ===
- Harnack, Adolf (1904). The Expansion of Christianity in the First Three Centuries. Vol. 1. New York: Putnam's Sons.
- Harnack, Adolf (1905). The Expansion of Christianity in the First Three Centuries. Vol. 2. New York: Putnam's Sons.

== See also ==
- Harnack medal
