= Ernst von Harnack =

German politician and resistance member (1888–1945)

Ernst von Harnack

Ernst Wolf Alexander Oskar Harnack (15 July 1888 – 5 March 1945), granted the title von Harnack in 1914, was an official of the Prussian provincial government, a German politician, and a German Resistance fighter. He was arrested, tried and executed in March 1945 at Plötzensee Prison for political opposition to the Nazi Party.

== Family ==
Harnack was born in Marburg as the son of the theologian Adolf von Harnack (1851–1930) and Amalie Thiersch (1858–1937), the granddaughter of the chemist Justus von Liebig. On 25 March 1916, in Hindenburg (Upper Silesia), he married Anna (Änne) Wiggert (b. 5 October 1894, in Göttelborn, Ottweiler district, Saarland; d. 22 August 1960, in Berlin), daughter of the Prussian official Ernst Wiggert and Elisabeth Schmidt. They had two sons and three daughters.

== Life ==
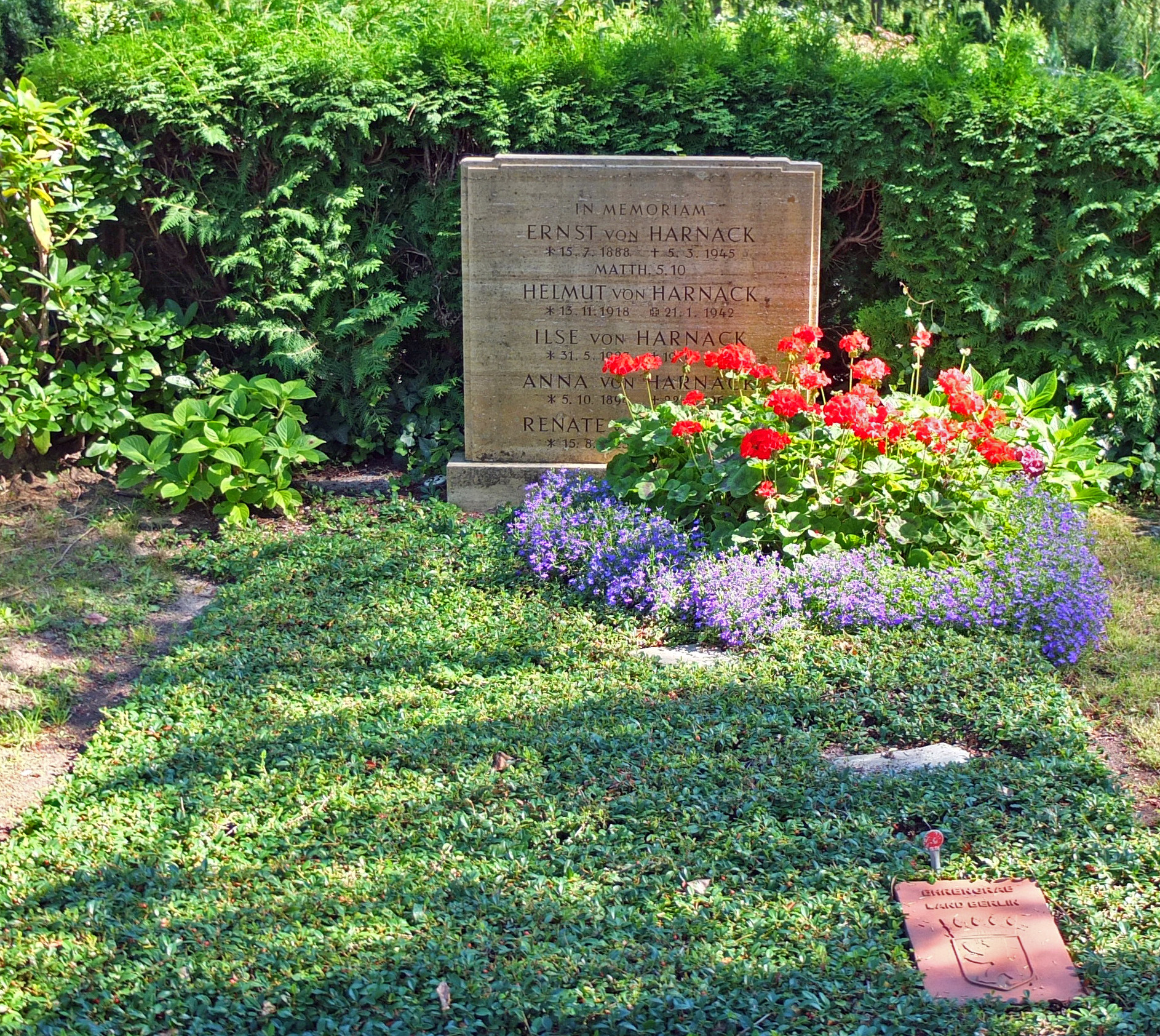
Harnack family grave in Zehlendorf cemetery in Berlin

After a year's private instruction, Harnack attended the Joachimsthalsches Gymnasium in Berlin, where he took the Abitur in 1907. Then he studied law at the University of Marburg and later in Berlin. On 6 May 1911, he took the bar examination and began afterwards working at a magistrate's Court in the Lichterfelde of Berlin. From 1 October 1911 to 30 September 1912, he spent a year doing military service as a one-year volunteer. From 2 August 1914 to 15 May 1915 he served in the First World War and was active with civil administration in Congress Poland. He began his official career on 8 March 1913 as a governmental junior lawyer in Oppeln. On 29 June 1918, he was appointed as a civil servant (Regierungsassessor) in the Ministry of Science, Art and National Education. He was promoted on 24 January 1921 to Regierungsrat. From 15 August 1921 to 9 November 1923 and from 1 June 1924 to 31 May 1925 he was a Landrat in Hersfeld-Rotenburg, with an appointment as Landrat in Uecker-Randow in the period between. On 1 June 1925 he was appointed vice head of the regional government (Regierungsvizepräsident) in Hanover. He was transferred on 1 April 1927 in the same position in Cologne. On 8 August 1929, he started as of the head of the provincial government (Regierungspräsident) in Merseburg.

Harnack was dismissed from government service after the so-called Preußenschlag by Reichskanzler (Chancellor) Franz von Papen on 20 July 1932. On 27 November 1921 he was elected to the executive committee of the Kirchenpartei called Bund religiöser Sozialisten (Federation of Religious Socialists). Harnack was arrested in 1933, after he had tried to determine the murderers of Mecklenburg-Schwerin's former Prime Minister and SPD politician Johannes Stelling, murdered during the so-called Night of the Long Knives. In co-operation with Willi Wohlberedt, he created a graves registration index cards for Berlin.

Accused of being a participant in the 20 July Plot in 1944, he was executed in March 1945 in Plötzensee and buried in an unmarked grave. His name appears on a family grave marker in Berlin.
