= Hansgünther Heyme =

German theatre director

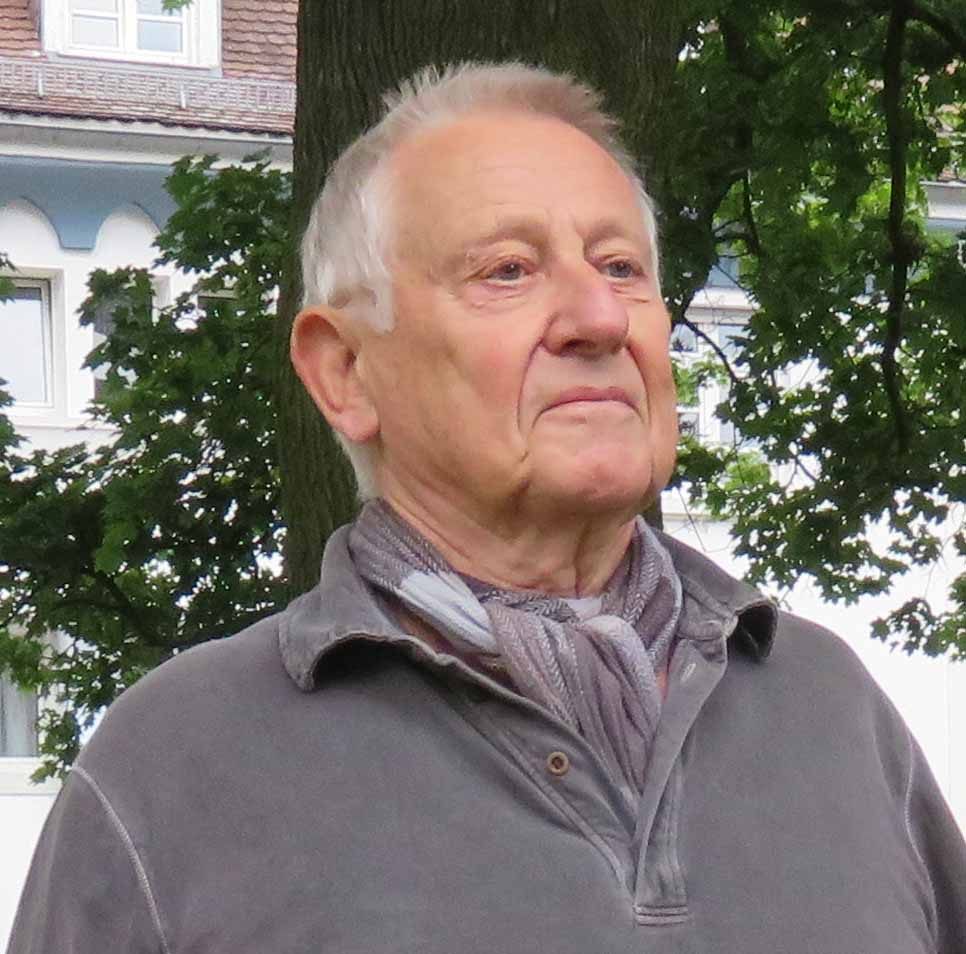
- Heyme in 2017
- Born: 22 August 1935 (age 90); Bad Mergentheim, Germany
- Occupations: theatre director; dramaturge

Hansgünther Heyme (born 22 August 1935) is a German theatre director and prominent figure in the Regietheater movement of the 1960s and 70s. Born in Bad Mergentheim, he studied at Heidelberg University and then under the German director Erwin Piscator. Heyme was the artistic director of the Staatstheater Wiesbaden from 1964 to 1967, the Schauspiel Köln (Cologne's principal theatre) from 1968 to 1979, the Württemberg State Theatre in Stuttgart from 1979 to 1986, the Ruhrfestspiele theatre festival from 1990 to 2003, and the Theater im Pfalzbau in Ludwigshafen from 2004 to 2014. Now in his 80s, he continues to work as a freelance director.

== Early years ==
Heyme was born in Bad Mergentheim. His parents were ballroom dancers who had run away together as adolescents to run a dance school in Cologne. After his father's death from typhoid in World War II, his mother Erika married Kurt Joachim Fischer who became a prominent journalist and screenplay writer in post-war Germany. After the war, the family settled in Heidelberg where Heyme received his secondary education at the Helmholtz Gymnasium. After graduating from the gymnasium in 1955, he briefly studied architecture in Karlsruhe, but then moved to Heidelberg University where he spent seven semesters studying sociology, German studies and philosophy as well as taking acting lessons.

Heyme was Erwin Piscator's pupil and assistant in Berlin and Mannheim in 1956. He then worked as an assistant director at the Heidelberg Castle Festival and as an organizer of the International Filmfestival Mannheim-Heidelberg. He also appeared in Bernhard Wicki's 1958 cult film Warum sind sie gegen uns? for which his stepfather had written the screenplay.

== Director and dramaturge ==
Heyme began his directing career at the Mannheim National Theatre and at Theater Heidelberg where he became both director-in-residence and an actor in 1958. He then moved to the Staatstheater Wiesbaden in 1963. Known as an "aggressive modernizer" of the classics, Heyme caused a near-riot in the Wiesbaden theatre with his controversial 1965 production of Schiller's play William Tell which he set in the Nazi era. His production of Marat/Sade that same year was the first to bring him national attention and was subsequently performed at the Berliner Theatertreffen festival as were many of his later productions. During the early 1960s he also directed one of the earliest performances in Germany of Harold Pinter's The Caretaker at the Theater im Zimmer in Hamburg and the German premiere of Joe Orton's Loot at the Deutsches Schauspielhaus in Hamburg.

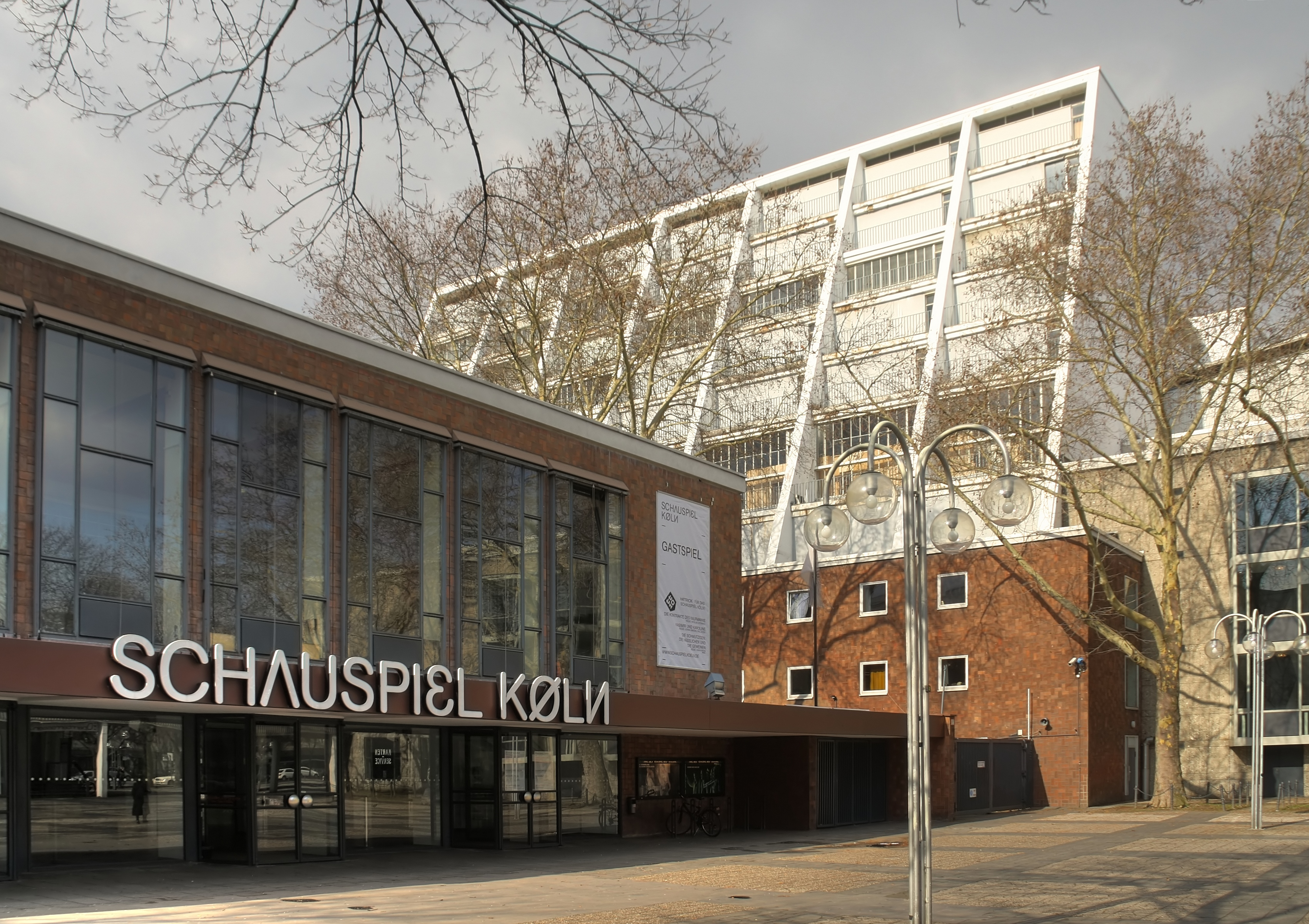
The Schauspiel Köln where Heyme was the artistic director and dramaturge from 1968 to 1979

From 1968 to 1979 Heyme was the artistic director and dramaturge of the Schauspiel Köln (Cologne's principal theatre). At Cologne he concentrated on works by the classic German playwrights, Schiller, Goethe, and Hebbel and on ancient Greek tragedies and comedies, his "Antiquity Project". The project produced some of the first performances in Germany of Euripides' The Bacchae and Aristophanes' The Frogs. As in Wiesbaden, Heyme's productions of both classic European dramas and ancient Greek plays were marked by their radical modernization which made reference to contemporary political and social issues. It was during this period that Heyme coined the term "subventionierte Opposition" ("subsidized opposition") to describe his vision of modern theatre. His last production for Cologne was a controversial Hamlet designed by the video and installation artist Wolf Vostell. The final scene of the Heyme-Vostell production depicted the dead Hamlet, Claudius, Gertrude, and Laertes lying naked on metal trolleys with their intestines on top of their bodies. Behind them newsreaders drone on flickering television screens while a dwarf repeatedly spins around Hamlet's trolley.

In search of new forms of theatrical expression in 1979, Heyme staged an epic production of Sophocles' play Antigone in Calcutta. The work was translated into Bengali and used local actors, many of them amateurs. It was performed outdoors with the actors under a specially constructed tent and drew large crowds. After leaving Cologne, Heyme worked as the artistic director for drama at the Württemberg State Theatre in Stuttgart. In 1986 he left Stuttgart for the Grillo-Theater in Essen and also taught directing at Folkwangschule there. He resigned from his posts in Essen in 1992 in protest at the cuts in the city's budget for cultural institutions. This was followed by a brief, unsuccessful period (1992–1994) at Theater Bremen. From 1990 to 2003 Heyme was also the artistic director of the Ruhrfestspiele theatre festival and concentrated primarily on his work there after leaving Bremen.

Heyme's last permanent post was as artistic director of the Theater im Pfalzbau in Ludwigshafen where he served from 2004 through 2014. His production of Goethe's Torquato Tasso inaugurated the newly renovated theatre in 2009. Amongst his other productions in Ludwigshafen were the German premiere in 2007 of Mohamed Kacimi's play on the Palestinian-Israeli conflict, Holy Land, and the world premiere in 2014 of Gilgamesch, a play based on a new German translation of the Epic of Gilgamesh by Stefan Maul and adapted for the stage by Christoph Klimke. His contract was not renewed at the end of the 2014 season.

== Later years ==
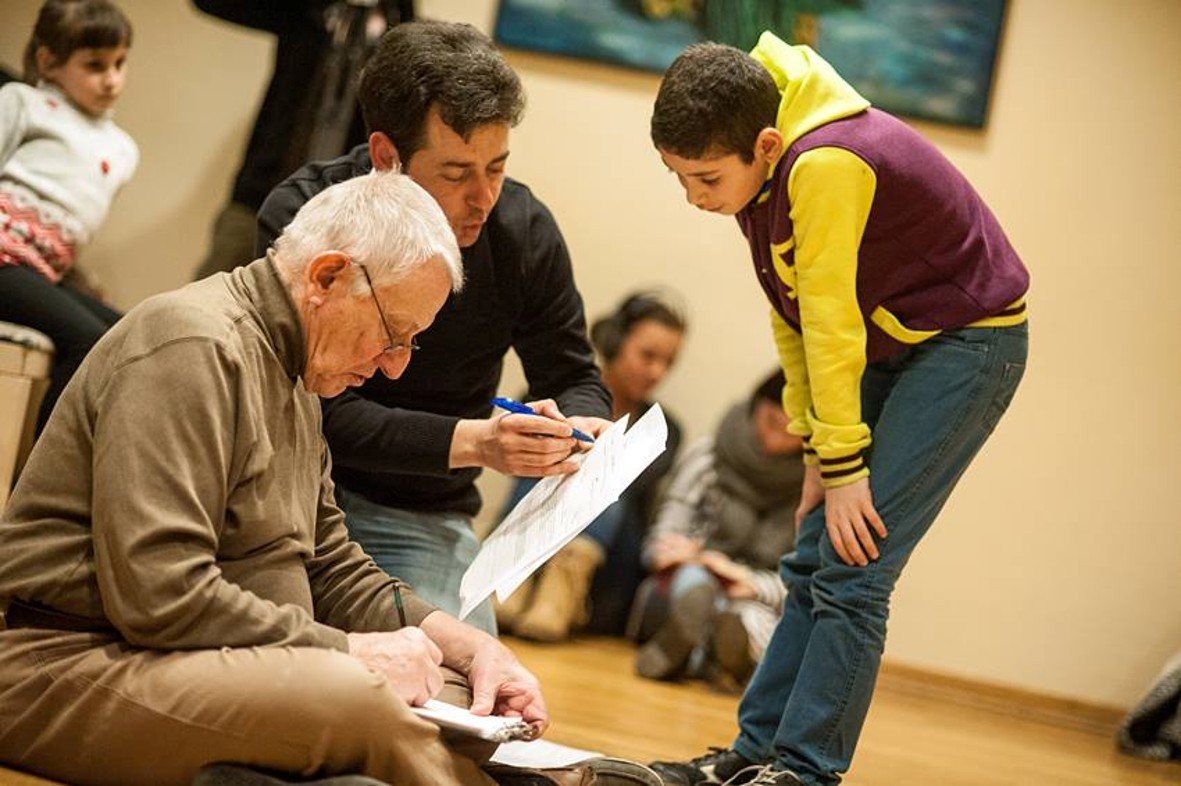
Heyme and Topchi rehearsing the production of The Tempest in 2015

In late 2014, Heyme began what he called his "Sturm-Projekt" (Storm Project). It was a production of Shakespeare's The Tempest updated to the present day and set in the Neckarstadt-West district of Mannheim, an area notorious for its crime and red-light district. Assisted by the bulgarian actor and assistant director Limeik Topchi (two fotos) he used a cast of mostly amateur actors, many of whom were Bulgarian immigrants living in the district. The dialogue was in German but occasionally switched to Bulgarian. Funded by the city of Mannheim and grants from private sponsors, the production premiered in the Mannheim district in which it was set on 10 July 2015.

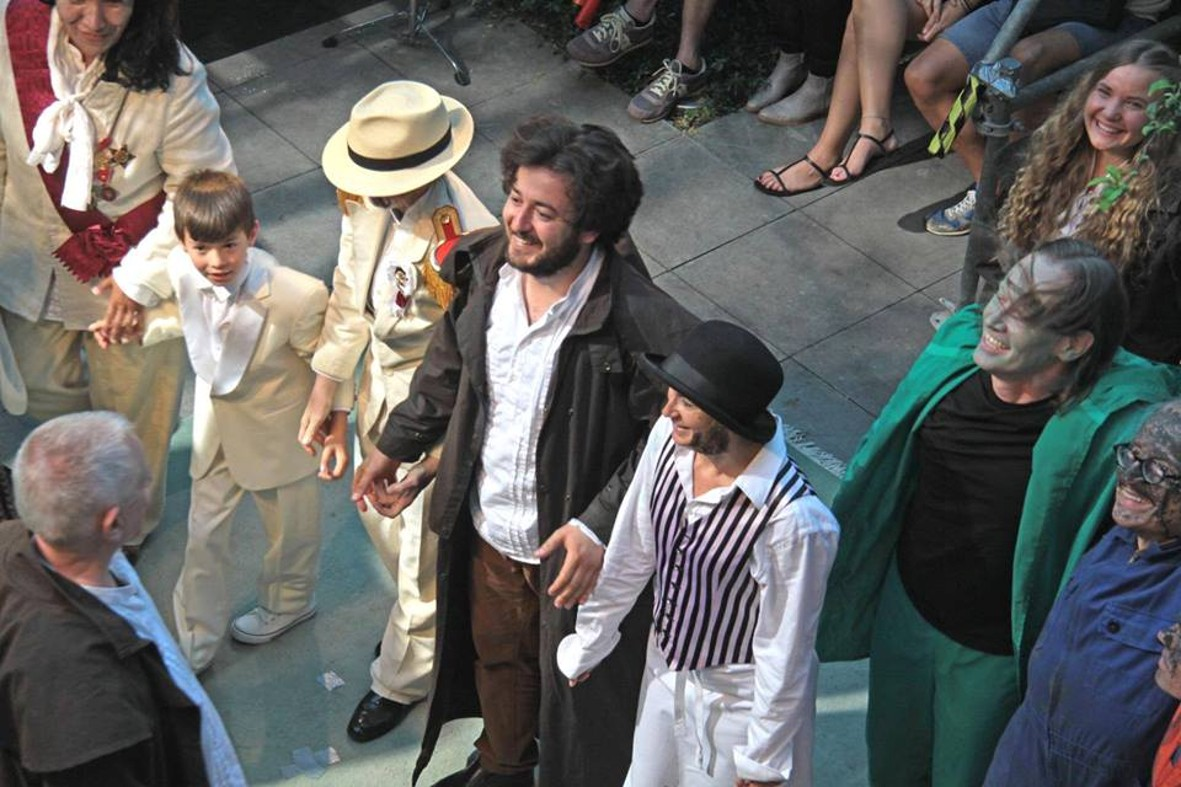
The tempest in Mannheim

The Storm Project is also central to Heyme's autobiography, Sturm. Splitter (Storm. Splinter), which was published in August 2015 to mark his 80th birthday. Written during the preparation and rehearsals for The Tempest, the book recounts episodes in his life from his early childhood to the present. Each of his memories takes a quote from The Tempest as its starting point, but they are not presented in chronological order. Also published in 2015 was Theater! Arbeit! Heyme!, a book devoted to Heyme's life and work by Peter W. Marx and Harald Müller.

Since leaving his post at the Theater im Pfalzbau, Heyme has continued to work as a freelance director. His later productions have included Ronald Harwood's play Quartet at the Hamburg Kammerspiele in 2016, Goethe's play Götz von Berlichingen at the Burgfestspiele Jagsthausen in 2018, and Viktor Ullmann's opera Der Kaiser von Atlantis for the Pfalztheater in Kaiserslautern in 2018. Although Heyme's directorial work has been primarily devoted to plays, he has directed several opera productions during his career. He had earlier directed Puccini's Manon Lescaut for Frankfurt Opera in 1983, Strauss's Elektra for the Pfalztheater in 2009, and Wagner's Ring Cycle for Theater im Pfalzbau and Oper Halle in 2013.

== Personal life ==
According to a 2018 interview with Heyme in Die Rheinpfalz, his career took a heavy toll on his personal life. He worked 14-hour days, and his controversial productions at times resulted in death threats, petitions to have him fired, and battles with the intendants of various theaters where he worked. Gómez, Heyme's Spanish Water Dog, is named after one such intendant because, as Heyme put it, he wanted to have a Gómez who obeyed him. Heyme has been married five times. His first four marriages ended in divorce. He lives in Ludwigshafen with his fifth wife, Éva Adorján, and the two youngest of his four children. Adorján is an actress and director who lectures in performing arts at the University of Koblenz and Landau. Heyme also has a country estate in the Westerwald region.

== Honours ==
- Order of Merit of North Rhine-Westphalia (1996)
- Kunstpreis Rheinland-Pfalz (2007)

== Publications ==
Heyme's publications include:

- Heyme, Hansgünther (1980) Antigone in Calcutta. Cologne: Prometh Verlag.
- Heyme, Hansgünther (Summer 1980). "Antigone in Calcutta: A Director's Notes". Theater, Vol. 11, Issue 3, pp. 55–58. Duke University Press.
- Heyme, Hansgünther (June 1983). "Medien – Kunst – Politik Pamphletische Behauptungen". Merkur, Vol. 37, Issue 420, pp. 728–731. Klett-Cotta.
- Heyme, Hansgünther (1986). "Nachwort" (Afterword) in Piscator, Erwin. Zeittheater: "Das Politische Theater" und weitere Schriften von 1915 bis 1966. Hamburg: Rowohlt Taschenbuch Verlag.
- Heyme, Hansgünther (2015). Sturm. Splitter. Mannheim: Persona Verlag.

Publications about Heyme's life and work include:

- Erken, Günther (1989). Hansgünther Heyme. Frankfurt: Fischer Taschenbuch Verlag.
- Crist, Christina and Sprenger, Werner (1989). Theater und Psychotherapie: Ergebnisse einer praktischen Theaterarbeit mit Hansgünther Heyme. Bonn: Federal Ministry of Education and Research.
- Marx, Peter W. and Müller, Harald. (2015). Theater! Arbeit! Heyme!. Berlin: Theater der Zeit.

The Theater Studies Collection at the University of Cologne holds an extensive collection of documents, printed material, and photographs from Heyme's career.
