= Peter Marx =

Peter Marx may refer to:

- Peter Marx (actor) (1914–1978), German stage and film actor
- Peter Marx (lawyer), American lawyer and business executive
- Peter W. Marx (born 1973), German theatre and performance studies scholar

== See also ==
- Peter Marxer (1933–2016), Liechtensteiner advocate and political figure
