= Til Kiwe =

German actor, voice actor and screenwriter

Jan Heinrich Tilman Kiwe (born Eduard Heinrich Kiefer), also known as Til Kiver or Till Kiwe, (b. 7 June 1910 in Aachen; d. 30 November 1995 in Munich) was a German actor, voice actor and screenwriter who also was an ethnologist and highly decorated army officer and POW. Thus, he often played soldiers, like a German guard in The Great Escape in 1963.

== Early life ==
Jan Heinrich Tilman Kiwe was born in Aachen on 7 June 1910. He trained as an actor as well as receiving singing instruction at the Conservatory in Aachen. In 1934, he passed his Abitur, a German Matriculation examination. From 1934 to 1937 he studied ethnology in Cologne and Baltimore, USA, as well as acting, under Swiss actor Adolf Manz and at the "Studio of Dramatic Art".

Before the Second World War broke out, he made several overseas trips, among them was an expedition to the Tibesti Mountains in French Chad in 1938.

== Military service ==
During the Second World War, Kiefer served in the Luftwaffe's Fallschirmjäger (paratroops). Between 1941 and 1942, he was in the elite 1st Parachute Division, which was part of Army Group South, during the invasion of the Soviet Union. In late 1942, Kiefer was transferred to the Afrika Korps fighting in North Africa. There he served as a Hauptmann in the 4th Panzerjäger Company, part of the Hermann Göring Division's Reconnaissance Battalion.

He became a prisoner of war on 12 May 1943 after all Axis forces in North Africa surrendered following defeat in the Tunisian campaign. Six days after becoming a POW, Kiefer was awarded the Knight's Cross of the Iron Cross. He was sent to Camp Trinidad, a POW camp eight miles from Trinidad, Colorado, USA. From here he made several escape attempts. On one occasion, Kiefer made it as far as St. Louis by train before he was caught. After escaping from another prison camp in Oklahoma, Kiefer made it to the Mexican border before being recaptured again.

He was repatriated to Germany after the war.

== Acting career ==
In post-war Germany Kiefer changed his name to Til Kiwe. In 1946 debuted in Munich as an actor at the experimental theatre Die Spieler ("The Players"). Kiwe acted in Munich until 1972, mainly at the Junges Theater ("Young Theatre"), the Munich Kammerspiele and the Bayerisches Staatsschauspiel ("Bavarian State Playhouse"). Among the roles that he played were Ruprecht in The Broken Jug, Leander in Franz Grillparzer's Des Meeres und der Liebe Wellen ("Waves of the Sea and of Love"), Eilif in Mother Courage and Her Children, Jim in The Glass Menagerie, John Rand in Gerhart Hauptmann's Schluck and Jau and Professor Higgins in Pygmalion. Kiwe likewise appeared in several Heimatfilme and repeatedly portrayed Wehrmacht officers, such as Claus von Stauffenberg's adjutant Werner von Haeften in Jackboot Mutiny (German title: Es geschah am 20. Juli — "It Happened on 20 July"), and, in a supporting role in Bernhard Wicki's wartime drama Die Brücke ("The Bridge"), a lieutenant and bearer of the Knight's Cross who in the war's dying days was rushing to keep ahead of the looming American advance. In Darkness Fell on Gotenhafen, he played an SS officer. In the second part of Fritz Umgelter's classic television series Am grünen Strand der Spree, entitled "Der General", he is seen alongside Wolfgang Büttner, Hans Pössenbacher and Anneli Granget as Major Illing, stationed as part of a divisional staff in northern Norway.

Even though Kiwe was quite busy as an actor, he still found time to work as an ethnologist. He went travelling and in 1953–1954, he found himself in the Atacama Desert, on Easter Island and on the Mato Grosso Plateau. Further trips took him to Sudan and once again to the Tibesti range. He recorded his impressions for UNESCO as producer and director for 17 documentary films, among others Wüste, Kupfer und die heilige Carmen; Menschen, Technik und moderne Waffen; Wege aus dem Dunkel; The Call of the Condor; Assuan und seine Folgen and Pearlstring of the Gods.

Beginning in 1972, Kiwe worked as a theatre director and staged, among other plays, The Broken Jug, Pygmalion, Volpone and Finden Sie, dass Konstanze sich richtig verhält? ("Do You Find that Constance is Behaving Herself?"), based on W. Somerset Maugham's The Constant Wife. From 1956 onwards, he was to be seen on television and played, among other roles, Superintendent Peters, alongside Josef Dahmen, in the crime series Hafenpolizei in 1963 for 39 episodes. He also wrote a few teleplays and screenplays, among them Auf den Wegen nach Rom (1959), Stahlschrank SG 3 (1966) and Flut über Polesine (1967). As a voice actor he lent Errol Flynn, David Niven, Douglas Fairbanks Jr. and Jean Marais his voice for German-language overdubs, and at the same time wrote dubbing scripts and worked as a dubbing director.

== Personal life ==
Til Kiwe was married and was father to a son and a daughter.

== Death ==
Kiwe died at 85 in Munich. His grave is to be found at the city's Neuer Südfriedhof ("New South Cemetery").

== Filmography ==
- 1949: Das goldene Edelweiß – Thomas
- 1950: Who Drove the Grey Ford? – Polizeirat Proske
- 1951: Eva und der Frauenarzt – Fred
- 1951: Decision Before Dawn – Adjutant (uncredited)
- 1954: Prisoners of Love – Heinz
- 1955: Children, Mother, and the General – Werner
- 1955: The Blacksmith of St. Bartholomae – Ruppert
- 1955: Jackboot Mutiny – Oberleutnant v. Haeften
- 1955: Parole Heimat – Major Winston
- 1956: The Vulture Wally – Vinzenz
- 1956: Where the Ancient Forests Rustle – Eibl, Ingenieur
- 1957: Saranno uomini
- 1957: Der Stern von Afrika – Mansfeld
- 1958: The Doctor of Stalingrad – Sauerbrunn
- 1958: Resurrection – Taras
- 1958: Der Schinderhannes – Gendarm Adam
- 1959: Rommel Calls Cairo – Amis
- 1959: Die Brücke – Knight of the Iron Cross
- 1959: Der Schatz vom Toplitzsee – Harold Pfeifer, Löhdes Assistant
- 1959: The Cow and I – SS-Offizier No. 2 (uncredited)
- 1960: Darkness Fell on Gotenhafen – SS-Offizier Lothar
- 1960: Am grünen Strand der Spree (TV Mini-Series, part 2) – Major Illing, Ib
- 1961: Schiffer im Strom (TV Mini-Series, three parts) – Erwin Zell
- 1961: Treibjagd (TV Movie) – 1. Detektiv
- 1961: One, Two, Three – Reporter
- 1961: Seit 5.45 Uhr wird zurückgeschossen – Narrator
- 1962: The Longest Day – Capt. Helmuth Lang (uncredited)
- 1963: The Great Escape – Frick
- 1963–1966: Hafenpolizei (TV Series) – Kommissar Peters
- 1964: Kommissar Freytag (TV Series, episode: "Der Schatten") – Kommissar Grosser
- 1964: Die fünfte Kolonne (TV Series, episode: "Eine Puppe für Klein-Helga") – Tirolerhut
- 1964: Massacre at Marble City – Fielding (voice, uncredited)
- 1964: Columbus – Bericht und Bildnis (TV Movie) – Zweiter Soldat
- 1965: Der Nachtkurier meldet… (TV Series, episode: "Bauherr Norske will keine Babys") – Herr Holger (uncredited)
- 1965: Black Eagle of Santa Fe (1965) – Blacky James (nvoice, uncredited)
- 1965: Gewagtes Spiel (TV Series, episode: "Das zweite Gesicht") – Lürsen
- 1966: Die rote Rosa (TV Movie) – Leutnant Liepmann
- 1966: Die seltsamen Methoden des Franz Josef Wanninger (TV Series) – Die Stute Flora
- 1967: Der Röhm-Putsch (TV Movie) – SA-Mann
- 1967: How I Won the War (1967) – Franz (uncredited)
- 1968: King Richard II (TV Movie) – Graf von Salisbury
- 1968: Graf Yoster (TV Series, part 11: "Wie macht man einen Krimi?") – Corsini
- 1968: Hannibal Brooks – Von Haller's Sergeant
- 1969: Ehepaar sucht gleichgesinntes – Arzt
- 1969: Stewardessen (TV Series)
- 1970–1971: Der Kurier der Kaiserin (two parts of this TV series) – Englischer Sergeant / Preußischer Offizier
- 1971: Welt Sex Report – Narrator
- 1973: Laß jucken Kumpel 2. Teil: Das Bullenkloster – Erwin Kutter (voice, uncredited)
- 1974: Liebesgrüße aus der Lederhose II. Teil: Zwei Kumpel auf der Alm – Erwin Kutter (voice)
- 1974: The Odessa File – Medal Shop Proprietor
- 1975: Champagner aus dem Knobelbecher – Major von Horwitz
- 1976: The Eagle Has Landed – (uncredited)
- 1978: Die Anstalt – Notary
- 1979: Son of Hitler – Dr. Puttkamer
