= Happy Days (play) =

Play by Samuel Beckett

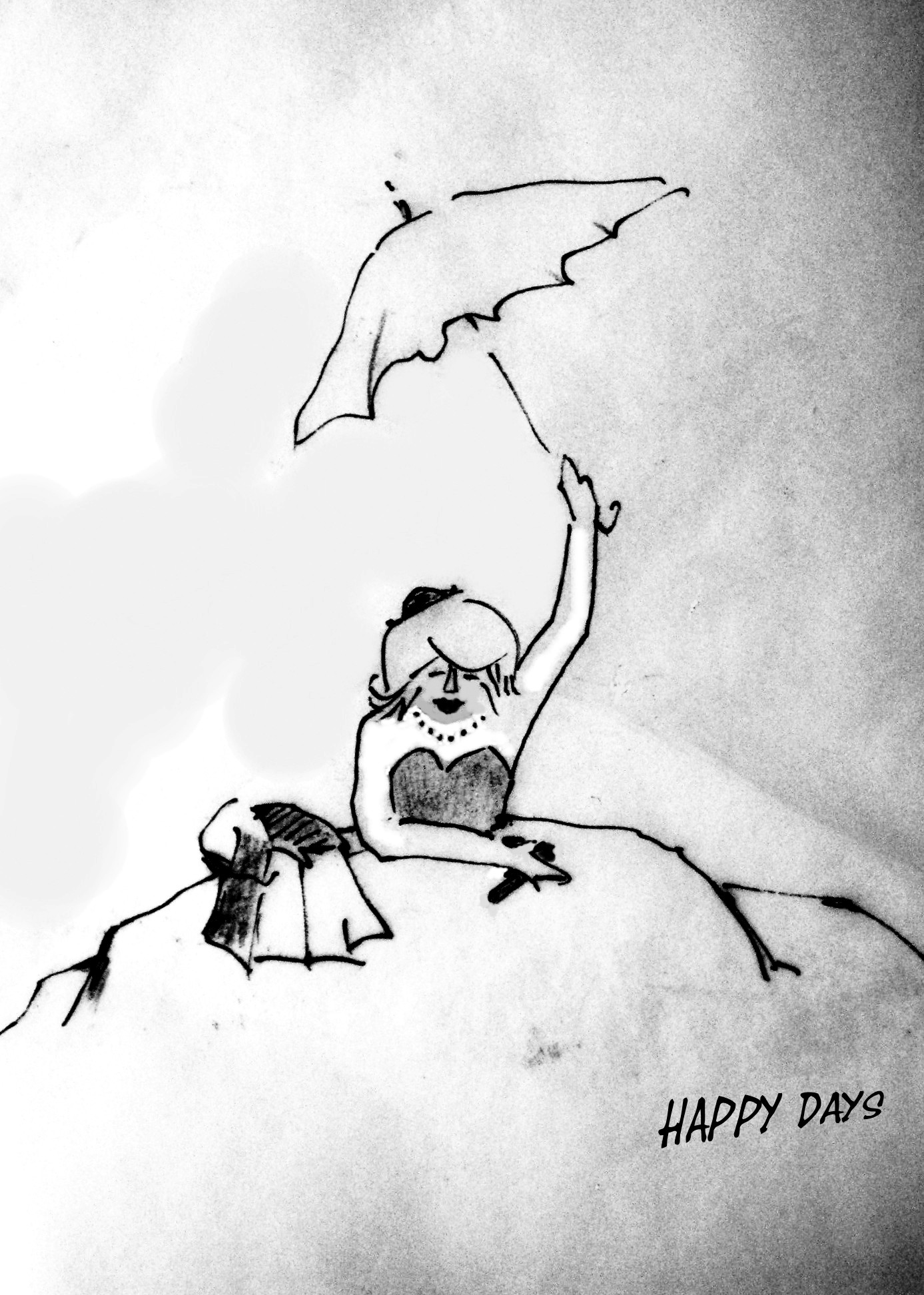
- Sketch of scene in Happy Days by Samuel Beckett
- Original language: English
- Written by: Samuel Beckett
- First publication: 1961

Premiere
- Date: September 17, 1961
- Place: Cherry Lane Theatre, New York City
- Directed by: Alan Schneider

Happy Days is a play in two acts, written by Samuel Beckett first performed in 1961. Viewed positively by critics, it was named in The Independent as one of the 40 best plays of all time.

Winnie, buried to her waist, follows her daily routine and prattles to her husband, Willie, who is largely hidden and taciturn. Her frequent refrain is "Oh this is a happy day." Later, in Act II, she is buried up to her neck, but continues to talk and remember happier days.

== Synopsis ==
=== Act I ===
Winnie is embedded waist-deep in a low mound under blazing light, with a large black bag beside her. She is awakened by a piercing bell and begins her daily routine with a prayer. Talking incessantly to herself, she brushes her teeth, drinks the last of a bottle of tonic, and puts on her hat. She struggles to read the writing on the toothbrush. She awakens her husband Willie, who is hidden by the mound, and prattles to him. He occasionally responds with headlines from his newspaper, one of which reminds her of her first kiss. They both look at an apparently saucy postcard. Winnie explains that Willie's listening enables her to go on talking, and is delighted when he responds even briefly to one of her many questions. After Willie briefly doffs his cap, Winnie instructs him to return to his hole, which he laboriously does. After he is within she repeatedly asks if he can hear her at different volumes, to which he replies, with increasing exasperation, "yes!" Winnie attempts to discover if Willie can see her if she leans backward, but he does not respond. Winnie spots an 'emmet' (an archaic term for 'ant') carrying an egg. Willie comments "formication" (A sensation of ants creeping on the skin). Both of them laugh hysterically at the homophone. Winnie declares that she never thought she would hear Willie laugh again. She then asks if he finds her loveable. After some deliberation with herself, she pulls a revolver out of her bag, recalls how Willie asked her to take it away from him, and banishes it to the ground beside her. She begins to feel sad about her life, but shakes it off. She puts up a parasol to protect herself from the sun, and holds it over her head for a long time. When this becomes tiring, she discovers she cannot move to put it down. She begs Willie for assistance, but he is unresponsive. The parasol then abruptly catches fire, and she throws it away. Willie still unresponsive, she coaxes him to prove he is conscious, which he eventually does, by raising a finger. Winnie speaks of the difficulty of dealing with the relentless sun and remembers when she was not trapped in the earthen mound. She thinks about the future, and the existential threat of being buried deeper in the mound. She finds a music box in her bag, to the music of which Willie briefly sings (though he ignores Winnie's request for an encore). Winnie files her nails and remembers the last people who passed, a Mr. and Mrs. Shower (or perhaps Cooker), who asked what she was doing stuck in the ground. She prepares her bag for the night. Willie emerges and Winnie wishes that he would come round and live where she could see him better. He reads his newspaper. Winnie asks Willie about the nature of hogs, to which he replies "castrated male swine, raised for slaughter". Darkness overcomes the pair.

=== Act II ===
Winnie is now embedded up to her neck, still wearing her hat, still with the bag and revolver beside her. She is awakened by the bell, which rings again each time she falls back asleep. She senses that Willie is looking at her but can no longer see him, and he does not respond to her calls. She continues to talk, examining her nose and recalling a time when a little girl called Mildred undressed her doll in the nursery at night, but is interrupted by anxiety about Willie and further memories of Mr. and Mrs. Shower. Willie crawls out from behind the mound, smartly dressed, which reminds her of the day he asked her to marry him. She encourages him as he tries to crawl up the mound towards her, and is delighted when he grunts "Win". She sings the music-box tune, a love song from The Merry Widow.

== Characters ==
=== Winnie ===
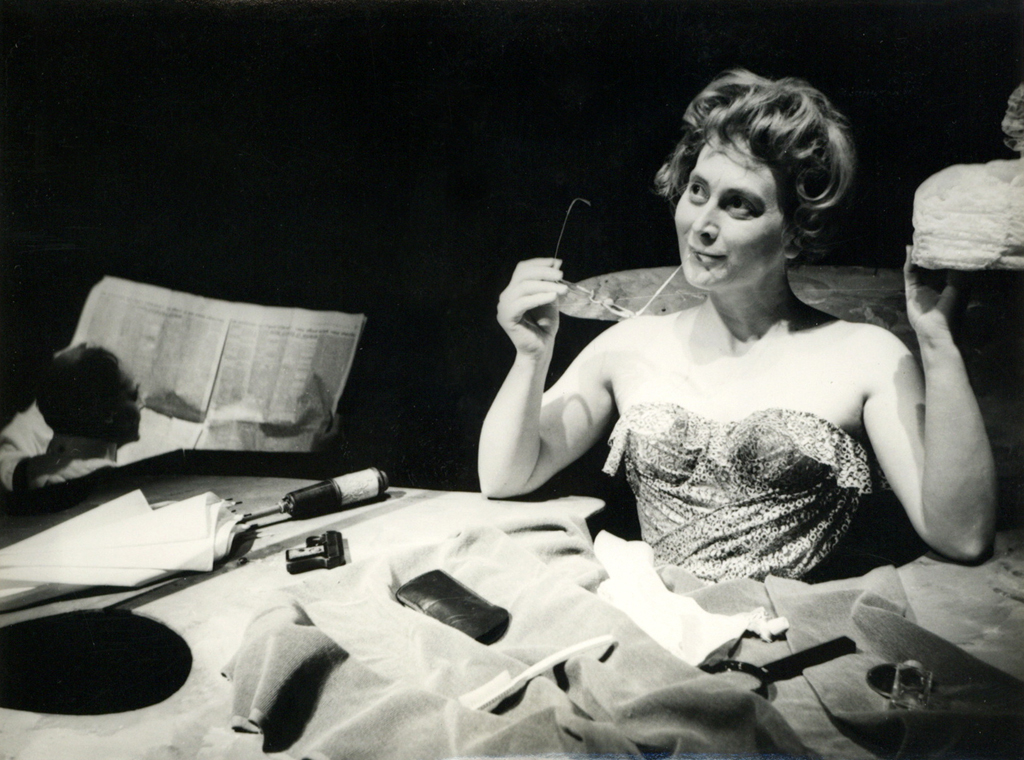
Štefka Drolc as Winnie in a 1964 play by Eksperimentalno gledališče

Winnie is one of those parts, I believe, that actresses will want to play in the way that actors aim at Hamlet—a 'summit' part. – Dame Peggy Ashcroft

Winnie is a "woman of about fifty", who passes her time between "the bell for waking and the bell for sleep" by following a very exact daily routine. In Act 1, after she methodically removes the items from her bag—a comb, a toothbrush, toothpaste, a bottle of patent medicine, lipstick, a nail file, a revolver and a music box. The routine is raised to the level of ceremony. Beckett's instructions to Billie Whitelaw in 1979 emphasize this:

The bag is all she has—look at it with affection … From the first you should know how she feels about it … When the bag is at the right height you peer in, see what things are there and then get them out. Peer, take, place. Peer, take, place. You peer more when you pick things up than when you put them down. Everything has its place.

At the end of the day she carefully collects her possessions—bar the gun—and places them back in the bag. Winnie never plumbs (never dares plumb) the bottom ("The depths in particular, who knows what treasures"), so it is also her hope chest.

The items in her bag also have secondary functions, they serve as aides-mémoire. But more, like Krapp's tapes or Lucky's bones they provide her with what Mary Doll describes as "touchstones of existential meaning". Winnie's perception of these objects connects her to the memories of specific days and important incidents within them.

Her possessions are all wearing out or running out. At the start of Act I she takes the last swig of her medicine before throwing away the bottle, her toothbrush has hardly any hairs left and the lipstick, to use Beckett's expression, is "visibly zu ende", the parasol is faded with a "mangy fringe" and even her pearl necklace is "more thread than pearls".

Winnie is the eternal optimist—Robert Brustein called her a "hopeful futilitarian"—but the available sources of her optimism are being used up and she has to work harder and harder to keep up her positive front which is already wafer-thin when we first meet her. Her effortful optimism is expressed in her carefully precise, self-correcting refrain, "Oh this is a happy day, this will have been another happy day. After all. So far."

Beckett described her as being "like a bird" and she makes every effort to rise above her predicament but she keeps getting pulled down. She never questions or explains why she finds herself in the predicament she is in, but her dream is that she will "simply float up into the blue … And that perhaps some day the earth will yield and let me go, the pull is so great, yes, crack all round me and let me out."

=== Willie ===
Willie is a man of "about sixty". In marked contrast to Winnie's loquacity, the henpecked Willie is laconic to a fault. In the whole of the second act Willie utters only one, barely audible monosyllabic word. Much of his dialogue consists of his quoting notices from his newspaper; his responses to Winnie—when he can be bothered to respond at all—are terse and barely communicative. He functions mainly as something for her to talk at—being used as a stooge by the old music hall pro that Winnie is—"just to know that in theory you can hear me though in fact you don't is all I need."

He keeps himself out of Winnie's gaze, only occasionally surfacing from his tunnel. His only interest is to bury himself, figuratively, in a newspaper or erotic picture postcards, or literally, underground in his cave asleep and seemingly unaffected by the bell that jars Winnie.

There is a childlike, if not exactly innocent, quality to him and there are many times in the play one might think Winnie was talking to a young boy rather than a grown man. Winnie also serves as his protector, the custodian of "Brownie" the revolver she keeps safe from him, lest he use it.

Whereas Beckett aligns Winnie with a bird, albeit one with oil on its feathers, he likens Willie to a "turtle", although many of the metaphors in the play associate him with pigs:

[I]n Act I Winnie speaks of envying "the brute beast" only a moment before Willie's "hairy forearm" appears above the mound; throughout the play Willie never rises to his feet, but crawls on all fours; and when Winnie notes that the bristles on her toothbrush are "pure ... hog's ... setae" Willie gives this comment a sexual dimension by revealing that a hog is a "Castrated male swine." In context, this phrase seems to relate to Willie, since various hints are made that he has been metaphorically emasculated by his domineering wife.

== Origin ==
Beckett began the play on 8 October 1960 and the English version was completed on 14 May 1961. Beckett finished the translation into French by November 1962 but amended the title. In a moment of inspiration, he borrowed the title Oh les beaux jours, from Verlaine's poem, "Colloque sentimental".

Cyril Cusack claimed that Happy Days was, by Beckett's own admission, "influenced" by Cusack's wife, Maureen Cusack's request that he "write a happy play" after Krapp's Last Tape.

Beckett confided to Brenda Bruce what was going through his mind as he sat down to write the play:

He said: "Well I thought that the most dreadful thing that could happen to anybody, would be not to be allowed to sleep so that just as you're dropping off there'd be a 'Dong' and you'd have to keep awake; you’re sinking into the ground alive and it's full of ants; and the sun is shining endlessly day and night and there is not a tree … there’s no shade, nothing, and that bell wakes you up all the time and all you've got is a little parcel of things to see you through life." He was referring to the life of the modern woman. Then he said: "And I thought who would cope with that and go down singing, only a woman."

Happy Days was first published by Grove Press in 1961 followed by Faber in 1963. By this stage in his writing career Beckett was becoming more aware of the importance of revising his work in actual performance and so wrote to Grove Press about Happy Days on 18 May 1961 to advise them that, "I should prefer the text not to appear in any form before production and not in book form until I have seen some rehearsals in London. I can't be definitive without actual work done in the theatre."

== Setting ==
Winnie is embedded in a "low mound", "the mother earth symbol to end all other mother earth symbols". She lives in a deluge of never-ending light from which there is no escape: even the parasol she unfolds at one point ignites, leaving her without protection. We learn that she has not always been buried in this way but we never discover how she came to be trapped so.

A number of suggestions have been put forth to explain where the idea for the original imagery originated. James Knowlson has suggested images from Luis Buñuel's 1928 film, Un chien andalou or a photograph by Angus McBean of Frances Day.

Beckett required the set to have "a maximum of simplicity and symmetry" with a "very pompier trompe-l'œil backcloth to represent unbroken plain and sky receding to meet in far distance". "What should characterise [the] whole scene, sky and earth", he wrote, "is a pathetic unsuccessful realism, the kind of tawdriness you get in a 3rd rate musical or pantomime, that quality of pompier, laughably earnest bad imitation."

The scene is reminiscent of a seaside postcard with Winnie buried in the sand and Willie with his knotted handkerchief and his boater. The fake backdrop calls to mind also the kind used by photographers that feature a painted body on a sheet of wood with a hole cut out where the head belongs popular at holiday venues. Even the title of the play, "Happy Days", is the kind of expression typically used when reminiscing about these kinds of holidays. Of note is the fact that he worked on the play while in the English seaside resort of Folkestone during the two weeks he was obliged to be resident in the area before his marriage to Suzanne could officially take place.

The play is also reminiscent of the music hall. The boater Willie sports at a "rakish angle" places his character clearly in the music hall tradition as does his formal wear in the second half of the play. Historically boaters were fashionable headgear up till about the 1920s at which time sunbathing started to become fashionable; prior to this ladies would commonly be seen making use of parasols to protect their white skin from the sun's harmful rays.

== Themes ==
=== Strangeness and Meaning ===
This play, with Winnie embedded in the earth and Willie crawling on it, is evidently strange. "Strangeness", Beckett informs us, "was the necessary condition of the play—of Winnie’s plight in the play." During Berlin rehearsals he said, "In this play you have the combination of the strange and the practical, the mysterious and the factual. This is the crux of both the comedy and the tragedy of it."

The question of "What does it mean?" is voiced in the play by the passer-by Mr Shower (or Cooker). Beckett explained this in a letter to Alan Schneider:

Shower & Cooker are derived from German "schauen" & "gucken" (to look). They represent the onlooker (audience) wanting to know the meaning of things.

Winnie comments sourly, "Usual drivel". But Mrs Shower provides an oblique answer: "What’s the idea of you, she says, what are you meant to mean?".

The play resists answers. When Kay Boyle asked Beckett why Willie reaches up towards Winnie, he replied:

The question as to which Willie is 'after' – Winnie or the revolver – is like the question in All That Fall as to whether Mr Rooney threw the little girl out of the railway-carriage or not. And the answer is the same in both cases – we don’t know, at least I don’t. All that is necessary as far as I’m concerned – technically and otherwise – less too little, more too much – is the ambiguity of motive, established clearly I hope by Winnie, 'Is it me you’re after, Willie, or is it something else? Is it a kiss you’re after, Willie, or is it something else?’ and by the conspicuousness of revolver requested in the stage-directions at beginning of Act II. To test the doubt was dramatically a chance not to be missed, not be bungled either by resolving it.

=== Time ===
Nevertheless, the central metaphor is clear: Winnie is sinking inexorably in the slow sands of time and disappointment.

In Happy Days the existential condition of the characters is visualized in the mound tightening around Winnie who is sinking deeper and deeper. The nearer she gets to the end, the slower does Winnie sink, and never does the end come to release her from the pain of being smothered in the mound. What Beckett wants to represent is the endless repetition of dying moments rather than death itself. His characters wish to finish life but the end never comes because the clock becomes slower and slower. There is still time, always.

The two-act structure emphasises the passing of time. Act II is bleaker than Act I, and Winnie knows it: "To have been what I always am – and so changed from what I was." By Act II she can no longer imagine any relief, and she can no longer pray, as she did at the play's start. Although she still intones the phrase 'happy day', it no longer triggers her smile."

=== Sexuality ===
The play has a strong sexual undercurrent and is full of sexual innuendo. "And it is sex which is responsible for the continuation of the life that plunges man inevitably into suffering. The sexual innuendos contrast, then, with images of sterility or 'discreation.'".

Winnie's memories often have a sexual edge: sitting on Charlie Hunter's knees; her first kiss; the two balls; an encounter in a toolshed; when handed the erotic postcard from Willie, she takes time to examine it before returning it in feigned offense and the story she tells of the small girl Mildred's (Beckett's original name for Winnie) sexual curiosity is genuinely disturbing. A mouse, in Freudian terms, is a phallic symbol and Beckett's protagonists often speak autobiographically in the third person. Also the doll wears a pearl necklet, as does she.

It should not be taken from this that the terrified child (assuming the story is figurative) has become the frigid wife; she talks knowledgeably about sex and early drafts of the play even show how their sex life has dwindled over the years. It does appear that sexual relations between her and Willie – a common British euphemism for penis – have been lacking, at least from her perspective:

There was a time when I could have given you a hand … And then a time before that again when I did give you a hand … You were always in dire need of a hand, Willie.

Perhaps this is why she teases him with her recollection of other men, to bring him out both sexually and imaginatively.

Supporting this is the fact that, "[i]n the Happy Days [production] of 1979, Beckett very particularly played upon the physical attractiveness of [Billie] Whitelaw … Where most Winnies, such as Peggy Ashcroft and Irene Worth, look rather matronly, Beckett made Whitelaw’s Winnie into a siren, with black, low cut gown, haunting eyes, exaggerated lipstick … a woman, who while not any longer young, still manifests a powerful erotic dimension".

== Language ==
Many of the play's jokes are plays on language. There is a running joke about the writing on Winnie's toothbrush. She struggles to read it, starting with "pure", and progressively seeing more adjectives but not the key noun. Finally learning that it is made of "hog’s setae", she presses Willie to define "hog". His definition ("Castrated male swine. Reared for slaughter") encapsulates his plight. They ignore the more unusual word: “setae" are stiff bristles, whose purpose on a worm is to grip the surface and help the worm move without going backwards.

Winnie struggles to recall quotations from the classics in contrast to Willie's quotes from the popular press:

In Beckett’s selection of quotation and oblique references, virtually every historical epoch is represented: pre-Christian Greek philosophies, the blind religiosity and Christian idealism of the Middle Ages, Renaissance Humanism, eighteenth-century Rationalism and nineteenth-century romanticism. The philosophers, literature and religions of Western man comprise the fragmented mythology against which Winnie fails and suffers and like a jeweller’s foil, mythology highlights the suffering.

Speaking is Winnie's raison d'être; words flow from her in an endless stream. She uses "clichés to insulate [herself] from the harshness of existence". In Beckett's texts, language conceals the world and provides comfort by insulating the individual. "Language generally in Beckett’s world is not a means of conveying meaning, but a balm for the sores of existence".

The final song is the waltz duet, 'I love you so' from The Merry Widow.

== Performance history ==
The first production was at the Cherry Lane Theatre, New York City, on 17 September 1961, directed by Alan Schneider with Ruth White as Winnie (for which she won an Obie) and John C. Becher as Willie. The first London production was at the Royal Court Theatre on 1 November 1962 directed by George Devine and Tony Richardson with Brenda Bruce as Winnie and Peter Duguid as Willie. The Irish premiere at the Eblana Theatre in 1963 was well received.

When Happy Days was first performed in London there were disagreements about every aspect of the text and production. Even Kenneth Tynan, one of the saviours of Godot, felt that Happy Days was "a metaphor extended beyond its capacity", nevertheless, he admitted Beckett's strange, insinuating power and urged his readers to buy tickets for the play.

1962 Danish version starring Bodil Udsen, who later performed it on television in 1964.

In 1964, an audio recording in French with Madeleine Renaud as Winnie was released by Disques Adès (TS 30 LA 568) as part of their " L'Avant-Scène" series. A German recording, with Grete Mosheim as Winnie and Rudolf Fernau as Willie, was released the same year by Deutsche Grammophon (LPMS 43 049).

In October 1968, a production with Sada Thompson as Winnie and Wyman Pendleton as Willie directed by Alan Schneider was performed at the Billy Rose Theatre in New York City, but only ran for three performances.

In 1972, Jessica Tandy played Winnie and Hume Cronyn played Willie in a production directed by Alan Schneider at the Mitzi E. Newhouse Theater in New York City.

In June 1979, Billie Whitelaw played Winnie and Jocelyn Herbert designed the sets in a revival at the Royal Court Theatre.

In 1979, Andrei Serban directed a production produced by Joseph Papp at the Newman Theater in New York City, with Irene Worth as Winnie and George Voskovec as Willie. In 1980, a television movie version was broadcast, directed by David Heeley (based on the 1979 stage version), again with Worth as Winnie and Voskovec as Willie, with an audio recording of the production released the same year by Caedmon Records on both LP (TRS 366) and audio cassette.

On 31 March 1996, BBC Radio 3 broadcast a production directed by Peter Wood with Geraldine McEwan as Winnie, Clive Swift as Willie and Phil Daniels as the Narrator.

In March 1998, a German production at the Theater im Zimmer, Hamburg, with Gerda Gmelin as Winnie and Karl-Ulrich Meves as Willie was recorded and released on CD by Litraton (LIT 5 8725, ISBN 3-89469-725-3).

More recent revivals on stage have occurred in 2003 at the Arts Theatre in London's West End with Felicity Kendal as Winnie, directed by Peter Hall, in 2008 at the Brooklyn Academy of Music in New York City, directed by Deborah Warner and starring Fiona Shaw as Winnie and Tim Potter as Willie, in 2014 at the Young Vic, starring Juliet Stevenson, and in New York City (The Flea Theater) and Pasadena (Boston Court Theatre) in 2015 starring Tony Shalhoub and Brooke Adams (who on 16 May 2020 as part of the "Stars in the House" series did a production from their home which was streamed online).

In 2016, the Yale Repertory Theatre mounted a production with Dianne Wiest as Winnie and Jarlath Conroy as Willie, directed by James Bundy. That production subsequently transferred to New York's Theatre for a New Audience in downtown Brooklyn, with Wiest and Conroy reprising their roles, in April and May 2017.

In 2018, Maxine Peake played the role of Winnie at the Royal Exchange Theatre in Manchester, directed by Sarah Frankcom.

In 2019, the Yale Repertory Theatre production was remounted in Los Angeles at the Mark Taper Forum with Dianne Wiest returning as Winnie and Michael Rudko as Willie, again directed by James Bundy.

In 2019, Theatre Kingston, in Kingston, Ontario produced Happy Days, starring Rosemary Doyle as Winnie and Richard Sheridan Willis as Willie, directed by Craig Walker and designed by Andrea Robertson Walker.

In early 2020, Thinking Cap Theatre in Fort Lauderdale, Florida produced Happy Days, starring Karen Stephens as Winnie and Jim Gibbons as Willie, directed by Nicole Stodard.

In June 2021, Trevor Nunn directed Lisa Dwan in a 60th anniversary production at Riverside Studios, London.

In May 2023, the Melbourne Theatre Company produced Happy Days, starring Judith Lucy as Winnie, directed by Petra Kalive.

In May 2025, the Sydney Theatre Company produced Happy Days, starring Pamela Rabe as Winnie, and directed by Nick Schlieper and Pamela Rabe.

In 2026, Pitlochry Festival Theatre announced it would be putting on a production as part of Alan Cumming's inaugural season, with Siobhan Redmond as Winnie and Forbes Masson as Willie, directed by Roxana Silbert

== Film ==
The film version of Happy Days was produced in 2000 as part of the Beckett on Film project. The film was directed by Patricia Rozema and starred Rosaleen Linehan as Winnie.

== Television ==
Anne Edmonds satirizes Happy Days in Bad Company, a 2026 Australian Broadcasting Corporation workplace comedy TV series, written by Edmonds.
