= 1964 in German television =

This is a list of German television related events from 1964.

== Events ==
- 11 January - Nora Nova is selected to represent Germany at the 1964 Eurovision Song Contest with her song "Man gewöhnt sich so schnell an das Schöne". She is selected to be the ninth German Eurovision entry during Ein Lied für Kopenhagen held at the HR Studios in Frankfurt.

== Debuts ==
=== ZDF ===
- 6 July – Slim Callaghan Intervenes
- October – The Adventures of Robinson Crusoe (under the title Robinson Crusoe)
- 27 November – The Sky Is Blue (TV film)

=== SDR ===
- 31 October – Der Nachtkurier meldet...

=== Other ===
- November – Kater Mikesch

== Television shows ==
=== 1950s ===
- Tagesschau (1952–present)

=== 1960s ===
- heute (1963–present)

== Births ==
- 9 December - Hape Kerkeling, comedian, author, TV host, actor, singer & voice actor
