= Who Drove the Grey Ford? =

1950 film

- Directed by: Otto Wernicke
- Written by: Kurt Joachim Fischer
- Produced by: Paul Pfeiffer
- Starring: Otto Wernicke; Ursula Herking; Hilde Sessak
- Cinematography: Paul Pfeiffer
- Edited by: Walter Boos
- Music by: Emil Ferstl
- Production company: Pfeiffer Filmproduktion
- Distributed by: Bejöhr-Film
- Release date: 12 October 1950
- Running time: 94 minutes
- Country: West Germany
- Language: German

Who Drove the Grey Ford? (German: Wer fuhr den grauen Ford?) is a 1950 West German crime film directed by Otto Wernicke and starring Wernicke, Ursula Herking and Hilde Sessak. Many scenes of the film were shot on location.

== Synopsis ==
In the American Zone of Germany shortly after the Second World War, a gang of criminals make a living from hijacking trucks full of valuable goods. A local police detective investigates.

== Cast ==
- Otto Wernicke as Kriminalkommissar Thieme
- Ruth Hambrock as Renate Münster
- Erich Scholz as Peteer 'Penny'
- Ursula Herking as Hertha Sattler, Kriminalassistentin
- Til Kiwe as Polizeirat Proske
- Hilde Sessak as Kellnerin bei Edu Schröder
- Marianne Gerzner as Rosl
- Günther Erich Marsch as Jonny Dempf
- Wolfgang Neuss as Uwe Lauterbach, 'Chef'
- Dieter Sommer as Franz Heiner
- Walter Vits-Mühlen as US-Kriminalkommissar Nelson
- Walter Pott as Edu Schröder, Wirt
- Abi von Hasse as Kriminalassistent Gillhausen
- Herbert Doberauer
- Georg Zimmermann as Hamerski, Oberpostschaffner

== Bibliography ==
- Davidson, John & Hake, Sabine. Framing the Fifties: Cinema in a Divided Germany. Berghahn Books, 2007.
