= Kurt Joachim Fischer =

German film producer and author (1911–1979)

- Born: 1 June 1911; Konstanz, Germany
- Died: 14 March 1979 (aged 67); Stuttgart, Germany
- Education: Heidelberg University
- Occupations: journalist; screenwriter
- Relatives: Hansgünther Heyme (stepson)

Kurt Joachim Fischer (1 June 1911 – 14 March 1979) was a German writer who worked as a journalist, film critic and screenwriter. He was the co-founder and first director of the International Filmfestival Mannheim-Heidelberg.

== Life and career ==
Fisher was born in Konstanz and received his doctorate from Heidelberg University in 1936 with a thesis on the organization of labour in the German civil service. He worked as a journalist and during World War II served in the German army as a war reporter and propaganda officer in charge of the Panzer-Propaganda-Kompanie 697 unit. Under the name Dr. Joachim Fischer, he published and wrote for The Panzerfaust, the unit's propaganda magazine as did Heinz Heydrich. According to an account by Fischer published after the war, from 1942 to 1944 he and Heydrich participated in an underground operation that helped Jews escape from Berlin to Sweden via Copenhagen by providing them with forged identification and travel documents. The documents were printed in the Panzer-Propaganda-Kompanie's print works. The print works came under investigation in 1944 and the rescue operation was aborted. Shortly thereafter, Heydrich committed suicide. Fischer was eventually sentenced to a six-year prison term.

Fischer's stepson, Hansgünther Heyme, who was ten years old at the time, recalled that he and his mother had heard on the radio in early 1945 that Fischer had been executed at the prison in Torgau on the orders of Roland Freisler's People's Court. Several months later, Heyme was playing outside in Bad Kissingen when a bedraggled man appeared on a bicycle. It was Fischer. Although at one point Fischer had been sentenced to death, the radio broadcast had been a hoax. According to the obituary of Fischer by Eckhard Becker in the Rhein-Neckar-Zeitung, a Gauleiter and former Nazi student leader at Heidelberg university convinced Heinrich Himmler to commute his friend's death sentence to imprisonment. Fischer was eventually freed by the American and Soviet troops who had entered the town on 25 April 1945.

After the war, the Fischer family settled in Heidelberg where Fischer wrote for many magazines and newspapers, especially about film and theatre. He also began writing screenplays which included those for Liebe 47, Wer fuhr den grauen Ford?, and Bernhard Wicki's debut film Warum sind sie gegen uns?. In 1952, he became the founding director of the Mannheim Cultural and Documentary Film Week, which later became the International Filmfestival Mannheim-Heidelberg and served in that capacity until 1960. During his time there he was instrumental in getting the East German film company DEFA to participate in the festival. Later in his career he made television documentaries on the theatre directors Fritz Kortner and Erwin Piscator and served as a consultant on film funding to the German Interior Ministry.

Fischer died in Stuttgart at the age of 67.

== Books ==
- Der Gefangene von Stalingrad: Bericht eines Heimgekehrten (1948). Willsbach: Scherer Verlag (memoirs of the German army on the Eastern Front)
- Niehans, Arzt des Papstes (1957). Munich: Andermann (biography of Paul Niehans)
- Studie zur Entwicklung und Konzeption eines neuen Kinotyps für Kleinstädte und kinolose Gemeinden (1970). Duisburg: Atlas Schmalfilm (on the development of new cinema types for small towns and cinematic communities)
