= Ruhrfestspiele =

Theatre festival in Germany

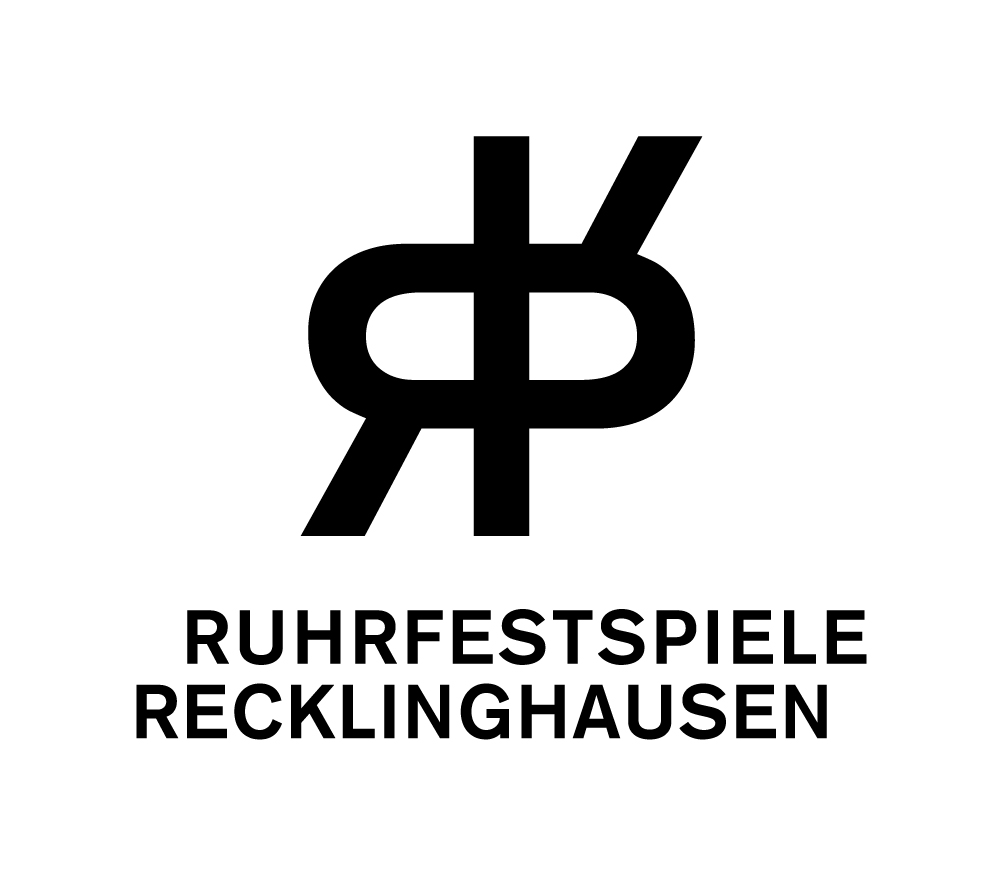

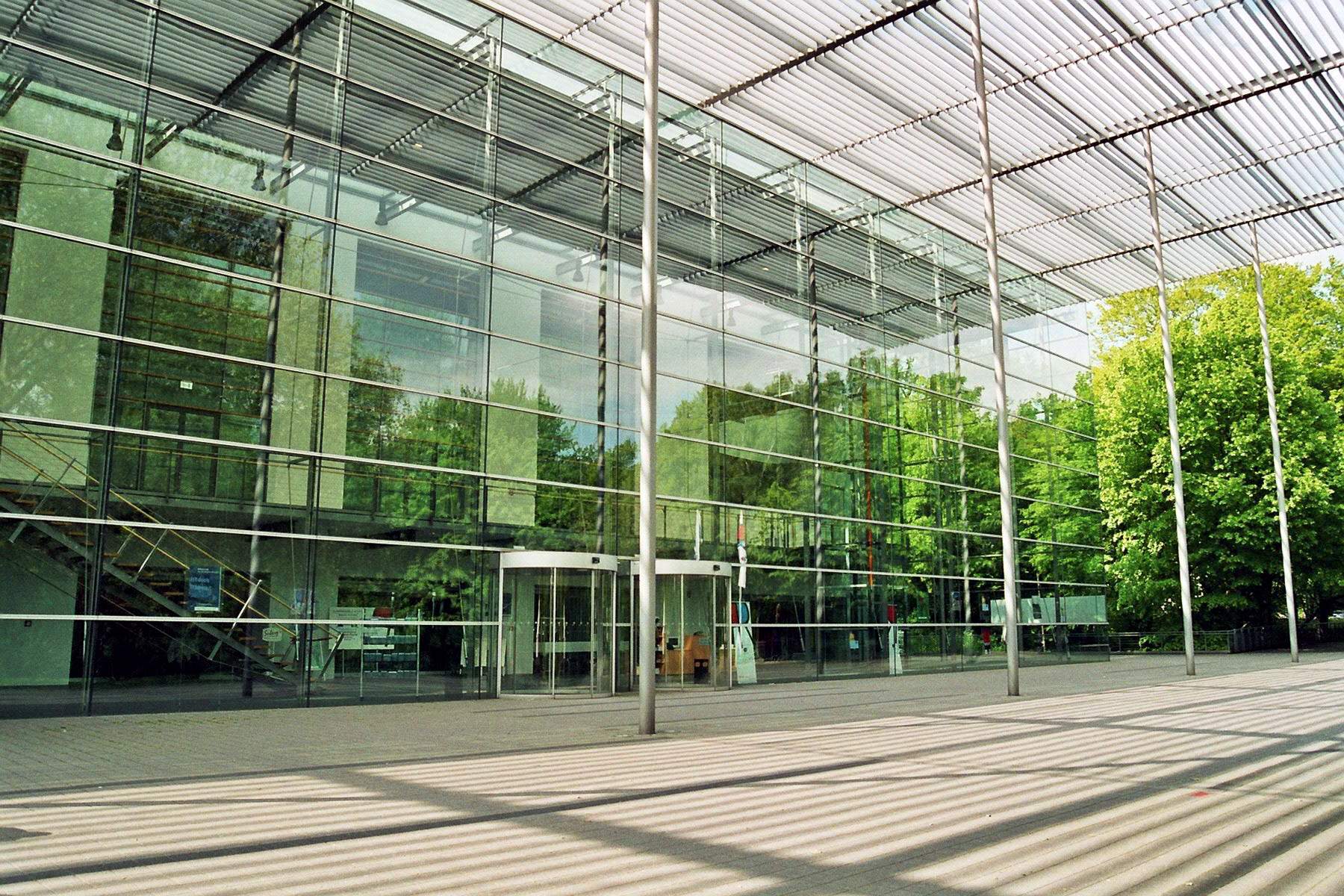
- Entrance to the Ruhrfestspielhaus, 2009
- Genre: European theatre, with a focus on political plays
- Begins: 1 May
- Ends: mid June
- Frequency: biennual
- Locations: Recklinghausen, North Rhine-Westphalia, Germany
- Inaugurated: 1946; 80 years ago
- Next event: 2016
- Organiser: Recklinghausen; Deutscher Gewerkschaftsbund
- Website: www.ruhrfestspiele.de

Ruhrfestspiele (Ruhr Festival) in Recklinghausen, North Rhine-Westphalia, Germany, is one of the oldest theatre festivals in Europe. Founded after World War II, the festival is a major annual cultural event for the Ruhr area. It always starts on 1 May and is funded by the city of Recklinghausen and the labour union Deutscher Gewerkschaftsbund (DGB). The festival comprises performances from European performers and theatre companies, and aims to bring different art forms, languages and cultures together. The main venue is the Ruhrfestspielhaus, which has won awards for its architecture.

== History ==
The festival originated in the postwar winter of 1946/47, when Hamburg theatres were unable to heat their premises and sent representatives to the Ruhr valley to "organize" coal. A small group of persons, led by Otto Burrmeister, head of administration of the Deutsches Schauspielhaus, went to the Ruhr Area with two wood gas trucks, and asked miners of the first mine they could find for fuel. Miners of the Pit King Ludwig in the Recklinghausen suburb of Suderwich provided the coal without the permission of the British occupation authorities, which led to the pit being called the cradle of the Ruhrfestspiele (Wiege der Ruhrfestspiele). In return, performers from the Deutsches Schauspielhaus, Thalia Theater and the Staatsoper Hamburg held performances at the Städtischer Saalbau hall in Recklinghausen in mid-1947 under the slogan "Kunst gegen Kohle" (Art for Coal). In 1948, the DGB labour union and the city founded a company to organize the first festival, that started with a performance of Goethe's Faust I. The state of North Rhine-Westphalia has supported the festival since 1949. The festival traditionally starts on 1 May.

Drama performances are complemented by concerts, art exhibits and political events. Operas were not performed after 1953 due to technical limitations of the Saalbau building. On 3 June 1961 construction started of a new hall, the Ruhrfestspielhaus, financed by the Friends of the Ruhrfestspiele (Freunde der Ruhrfestspiele), an association founded by Federal President Theodor Heuss. The new building opened in 1965. Its architecture is influenced by the Bauhaus.

The program grew more political in the 1960s and 1970s, showing performances of independent ensembles such as the Grips-Theater and the Theatermanufaktur Berlin, and plays by Bertolt Brecht.

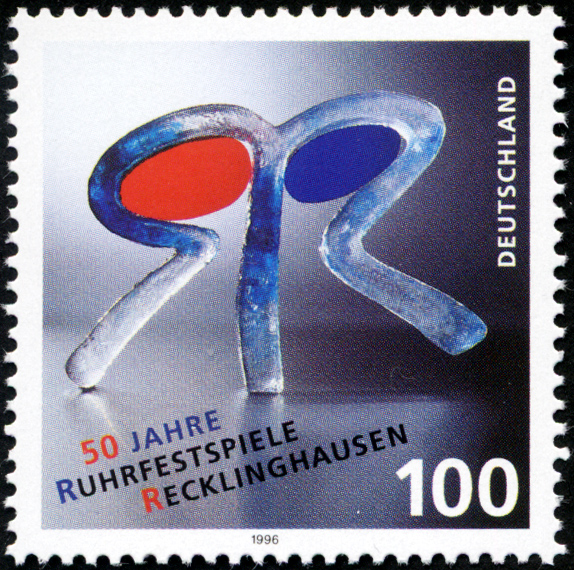
Ruhrfestspiele logo on a 1996 German stamp, celebrating 50 years

Beginning in 1990, the festival was expanded to a Europäisches Theater (European Theater). The new director Hansgünther Heyme, who shaped the festival until 2003, invited companies from European countries "from the Atlantic to the Urals", in an effort to counteract growing nationalism and xenophobia. He set mottos for the each festival, in 1991 it was "Foundations of Empire"(Reichs-Gründungen), in 1993 "25 Years after 1968" (Aufbrüche – 25 Jahre nach ’68), in the 50th anniversary year of 1996 "Art is the Motor of Every Culture" (Kunst ist der Motor jeder Kultur), in 1998 "Future Without Past" (Zukunft ohne Vergangenheit), 2001 "Courage, I say, Courage" (Mut, sag ich, Mut), 2002 "Longings and addictions" (SehnSüchte).

From 1996 to 1998, the Ruhrfestspielhaus was transformed into a congress center, including the addition of an entrance hall. The remodelling was awarded the German Architecture Prize in 2001. Henry Moore's sculpture "Large Reclining Figure Number 5" (Große Liegende Nr. 5) is placed at the building's entrance. Other performing spaces were used whilst the Ruhrfestspielhaus was being remodelled, such as the Vestlandhalle, the Marl theatre, in storage halls of the Auguste Victoria mine in Marl and in the Theaterzelt (theatre tent).

Frank Hoffmann has been the director since 2005. He has encouraged classic plays, such as Gotthold Ephraim Lessing's Minna von Barnhelm, Emilia Galotti and Nathan der Weise. In 2006, the theme was William Shakespeare with plays such as Richard II in a production of The Old Vic with Kevin Spacey and Greg Wise. The motto of 2008 was "Once Upon a Time in America ... A Dream of Theatre" (Es war einmal in Amerika ... Ein Traum vom Theater), showing works by Eugene O'Neill, Speed-the-Plow by David Mamet and Blackbird by David Harrower. The theme of 2009 was "Northern Lights" (Nordlichter), presenting plays by Henrik Ibsen and August Strindberg, but the festival also showed Chekhov's The Cherry Orchard and Shakespeare's The Winter's Tale, both in a collaboration with the Brooklyn Academy of Music and The Old Vic.

In 2010, when the region was the European Capital of Culture, the theme was "The Continent of Kleist in the Romantic Ocean" (Kontinent Kleist im romantischen Meer), which looked at the influence of dramatist and poet Heinrich von Kleist on his contemporaries and successors. The festival had 46 main productions and a total of 208 events. John Malkovich appeared in a musical version of the movie The Infernal Comedy – confessions of a serial killer by Michael Sturminger.

In 2012, the Motto was "Im Osten was Neues: Von den fernen Tagen des russischen Theaters in die Zukunft", reflecting Russian theatre, with performances of plays by Pushkin, Chekhov, Tolstoi and Dostoyevski. The festival attracted some 80,000 visitors.

== Literature ==
- Ruhrfestspiele Recklinghausen GmbH (ed.): 50 Jahre Ruhrfestspiele Recklinghausen. Pomp, Essen 1996
- Ingeborg Schnelling-Reinicke: Gründung und Entwicklung der Ruhrfestspiele in Recklinghausen. Rheinland-Verlag, Köln 1998
