= Jackboot Mutiny =

1955 film

- Directed by: Georg Wilhelm Pabst
- Written by: Hans W. Hagen; Gustav Machatý; Jochen Wilke; Werner P. Zibaso
- Produced by: Jochen Genzow; Franz Seitz
- Starring: Bernhard Wicki
- Cinematography: Kurt Hasse
- Edited by: Herbert Taschner
- Release date: 19 June 1955
- Running time: 75 minutes
- Country: West Germany
- Language: German

Jackboot Mutiny (German: Es geschah am 20. Juli, literally It Happened on 20 July) is a 1955 West German film directed by Georg Wilhelm Pabst about the 20 July Plot to assassinate Adolf Hitler.

== Cast ==
- Bernhard Wicki as Oberst Graf Claus Schenk von Stauffenberg
- Karl Ludwig Diehl as Generaloberst a.D. Ludwig Beck
- Carl Wery as Generaloberst Friedrich Fromm
- Kurt Meisel as SS Obergruppenführer
- Erik Frey as General Friedrich Olbricht
- Albert Hehn as Major Otto Ernst Remer
- Til Kiwe as Oberleutnant Werner von Haeften
- Jochen Hauer as Generalfeldmarschall Wilhelm Keitel
- Annemarie Sauerwein as Frau Olbricht
- Jaspar von Oertzen as Oberst Albrecht Mertz von Quirnheim
- Willy Krause as Joseph Goebbels
- Lina Carstens as Frau des Küsters
- Gernot Duda as Leutnant in der Wolfsschanze
- Ernst Fritz Fürbringer as Generalfeldmarschall Erwin von Witzleben
- Peter Lühr as 1. General

== See also ==
- The Plot to Assassinate Hitler (1955) German feature film
