= Peter W. Marx =

German theatre scholar (b. 1973)

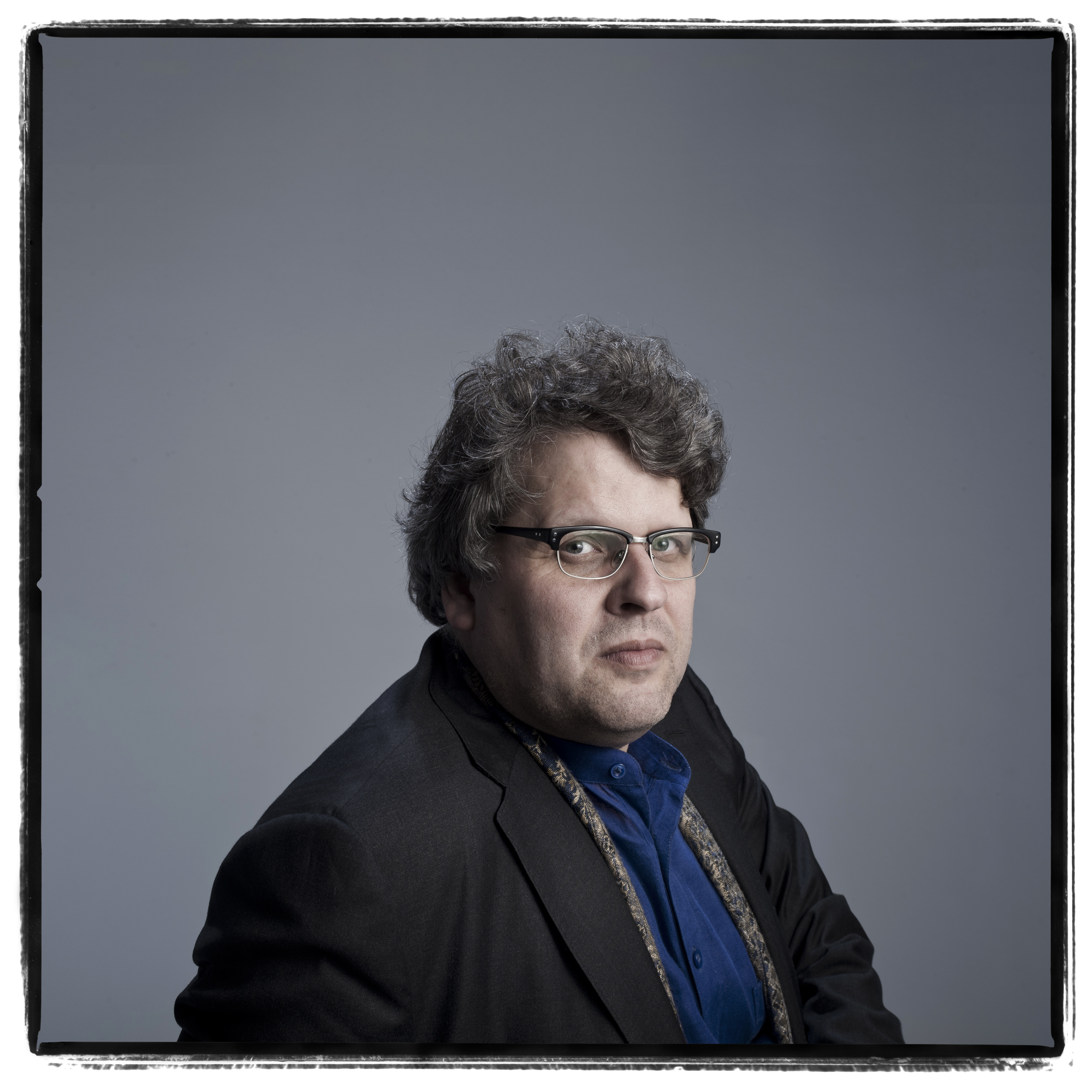
Peter W. Marx

Peter W. Marx (born 1973 in Limburg an der Lahn) is a German Theatre and Performance studies Scholar. He is the chairperson of Theatre and Media Studies at the University of Cologne where he is the director of its Theaterwissenschaftliche Sammlung as well.

Marx is recognized for his research on metropolitan culture at the beginning of the 20th century as well as on Max Reinhardt with an emphasis on Cultural Studies. In addition, his work focuses on contemporary theatre and Shakespeare in performance, particularly on "Hamlet" as a figure of cultural mobility.

== Curriculum Vitae ==
At the Johannes Gutenberg University of Mainz, Marx received his PhD with a dissertation entitled "Theater And Cultural Memory" discussing works of George Tabori, Tadeusz Kantor and Rina Yerushalmi. The study was awarded with the Research-Funding-Award 2002 of the Friends of the University of Mainz.

In the year 2003 Marx was appointed Junior-Professor for Theater Studies with a focus on Cultural Studies at the University of Mainz. With the completion of a research project for the Feodor-Lynen-Fellowship from the Alexander von Humboldt Foundation, he became a visiting scholar at the Columbia University in New York City for three expanded research stays between 2004 and 2006. He held various visiting professorships at the universities of Hildesheim, Vienna and the Free University of Berlin between 2007-2009. (References) From 2009 to 2012, Marx was an associate professor at the University of Bern. In February 2012, he was appointed Professor of Theater and Media Studies at the University of Cologne and director of the Theaterwissenschaftliche Sammlung. Since April 2012, he has also been head of the Department of Media Culture and Theatre.

Marx is a member of the executive committee of International Federation for Theatre Research (FIRT/IFTR).

In 2018, his monograph Hamlets Reise nach Deutschland (Hamlet's Voyage to Germany) appeared.

== Key Study Activities ==
- Theater History (emphasis on the 19th and 20th centuries)
- Critical Media History
- Techniques of Imagination
- Cultural Studies
- Popular Culture and Media Studies (the staging of foreignness in films and TV series)
- Intercultural Studies
- Jewish Studies
- Shakespeare and His Theater, Shakespeare-Reception in Germany

== Selected Research Projects ==
- "Female Voices" (research project for an archival focus at the Theatre Archive Cologne, since 2016)
- "Hamlet's Journey to Germany. A Cultural History of the Collective Imaginary" (monograph; expected completion 2017)
- Subproject "The Stage as Scena Mundi: Narration, Performance and Imagination" in the framework of the Sinergeia-Research Network "The Interior: Art, Space, and Performance (Early Modern to Postmodern)", overall direction Prof. Dr. Christine Göttler, founded by the Swiss National Fund (University of Berne and University of Cologne, 2012-2016)
- Research Project "Hamlet's Odyssey – A Study on the Phenomenon of Cultural Mobility", sponsored by the Swiss National Fund (University of Bern, 2011-2015)
- Authorization of a Marie-Curie-Fellowship for Dr. Katharina Wessely with the project "The Theatrical Landscape of Bohemia and Moravia as a Space of Negotiating Cultural Identities (TheatLandIdent)", sponsored by the Research Executive Agency of the EU (University of Bern, ongoing since 2011)
- Doctoral workshop course "Cultural Mobility", sponsored by the non-professional faculty of the University of Berne (University of Bern, 2011)
- Grant for printing costs for the volume "Berlin on the Way to Becoming the Theater Capital. Theater Pamphlets between 1869-1914" (co-edited by Stefanie Watzka) by the Bank of Prussia (2008)
- "Mainstreaming the Minorities? The Representation of Ethnicity and its Function in Popular-Cultural Media in the German-US-American Comparison." (together with Prof. Dr. Mita Banerjee), sponsored by the Johannes-Gutenberg-University Center for Intercultural Studies in Mainz (2003-2004)

== Selected publications ==
- "Heiner Müller: Image Description. An Analysis from the Perspective of Greimas' Semiotics", Frankfurt am Main and others: Peter Lang, 1998.
- "Theater and Cultural Memory. Cultural Semiotic Research on George Tabori, Tadeusz Kantor and Rina Yerushalmi", Tübingen: Francke, 2003.
- "Max Reinhardt. From Bourgeois Theater to Metropolitan Culture", Tübingen: Francke, 2006.
- "A Theatrical Age. Bourgeois Self-Staging around 1900", Tübingen: Francke, 2008.
- With Stefanie Watzka (ed.) "Berlin on the Way to Becoming the Theater Capital. Theater Pamphlets between 1869 and 1914", Tübingen: Francke, 2009.
- (ed.) "Handbook Drama. Theory, Analysis, History", Stuttgart/Weimar: J.B. Metzler, 2012.
- with Petra Hesse (eds.): "Raum-Maschine Theater. Szene und Architektur", Cologne: Wienand 2012.
- (ed.): "Dülberg meets Wagner", Cologne: Wienand, 2013.
- (ed.): "Hamlet-Handbuch. Stoffe, Aneignungen, Deutungen", Stuttgart/Weimar: J. B. Metzler, 2014.
- with Petra Hesse (eds.): "A Party for Will! Eine Reise in das Shakespeare-Universum/A Journey through Shakespeare's Universe", Berlin: Theater der Zeit, 2014.
- (ed.): "Michael Hampe. Über Theater. Reden und Schriften", Cologne: Wienand 2015, ISBN 978-3-86832-259-0.
- with Harald Müller (eds.): "Theater! Arbeit! Heyme! Der Schauspieler, Regisseur und Intendant Hansgünther Heyme", Berlin: Theater der Zeit, 2015, ISBN 978-3-95749-043-8.
- (Ed.): A Cultural History of Theatre in the Age of Empire (1800-1920), London: Bloomsbury, 2017, ISBN 978-1472585844
- Hamlets Reise nach Deutschland: Eine Kulturgeschichte, Berlin: Alexander Verlag, 2018, ISBN 978-3895814907
- (Ed.): 100 Jahre Theaterwissenschaftliche Sammlung Köln: Dokumente, Pläne, Traumreste, Berlin: Alexander Verlag 2020 (published in November 2019), ISBN 978-3895815157
- Macht | Spiele: Politisches Theater seit 1919, Berlin: Alexander Verlag, 2020 (published in November 2019), ISBN 978-3895815164

== Exhibitions ==
- "Im SPIELRAUSCH: Von Drachentötern, Königinnen und Pixelmonstern" (Museum of Applied Arts Cologne, August 2016 through February 2017)
- "A Party for Will! A Journey through Shakespeare's Universe" (Museum of Applied Arts Cologne, March 2014 through July 2014; Heslington Hall York, May 2015 (as part of the York International Shakespeare Festival))
- "Raum-Maschine Theater. Szene und Architektur" (Museum of Applied Arts Cologne, December 2012 through April 2013)
