= Peter Marx (lawyer) =

American lawyer and business executive

- Education: BA, MBA, and JD
- Alma mater: Cornell University
- Notable work: Information Law: A Compilation of Articles
- Television: Business Insight
- Board member of: Wellesley Public Media Corporation Board of Directors (president)

Peter Marx is an American lawyer and business executive renowned for coining the term "Information law". Currently, he serves as the President of the Wellesley Public Media Corporation Board of Directors. Marx is also the former host of the public television show Business Insight.

== Education ==
Peter Marx received a BA, MBA, and JD from Cornell University.

== Career ==
Between 1968 and 1971, Peter Marx held the position of staff attorney with the U.S. Securities and Exchange Commission. In the early 1980s, Marx assumed the roles vice president and general counsel of Chase Econometrics/Interactive Data Corporation. During his tenure, Marx chaired numerous legal technology forums that focused on the future of law in technology and intellectual property, including the New England Computer Law Forum.

He later became a partner at the Goulston & Storrs law firm in Boston, where he specialized in the emerging field of applying law to technology companies. Throughout the 1980s, Marx advocated for companies and clients to understand their rights better in order to seize potential market opportunities as industry laws evolved, and urged governments to adapt accordingly. Subsequently, he assumed the role of general counsel to the Information Industry Association, a five-hundred member firm group, and served as chairman of the New England Corporate Counsel Association (an industry group for northeastern in-house counsel that he cofounded). Beginning in 1987, Marx was the chairman of The Marx Group, a law and consulting firm, which provided part-time counsel and legal help for technology companies unable to retain full-time in-house legal help.

== Media ==
In the mid-2000s, Marx created podcasts and videos for major law firms aimed at law students and associates. Marx also hosted the television series Business Insight on public access television, conducting interviews with entrepreneurs and other business figures. He is the President of the Wellesley Public Media Corporation Board of Directors, as well as the current director of the Cornell Law School’s Alumni Helping Alumni careers program.

== Books ==
Marx is the author of Information Law: A Compilation of Articles, in which he first coined the term “Information Law” in 1985. He later wrote the Contracts in the Information Industry series of books, published by the Information Industry Association.
