= Pfalzbau =

Convention centre in Ludwigshafen, Germany

Coordinates: 49°28′46″N 8°26′46″E

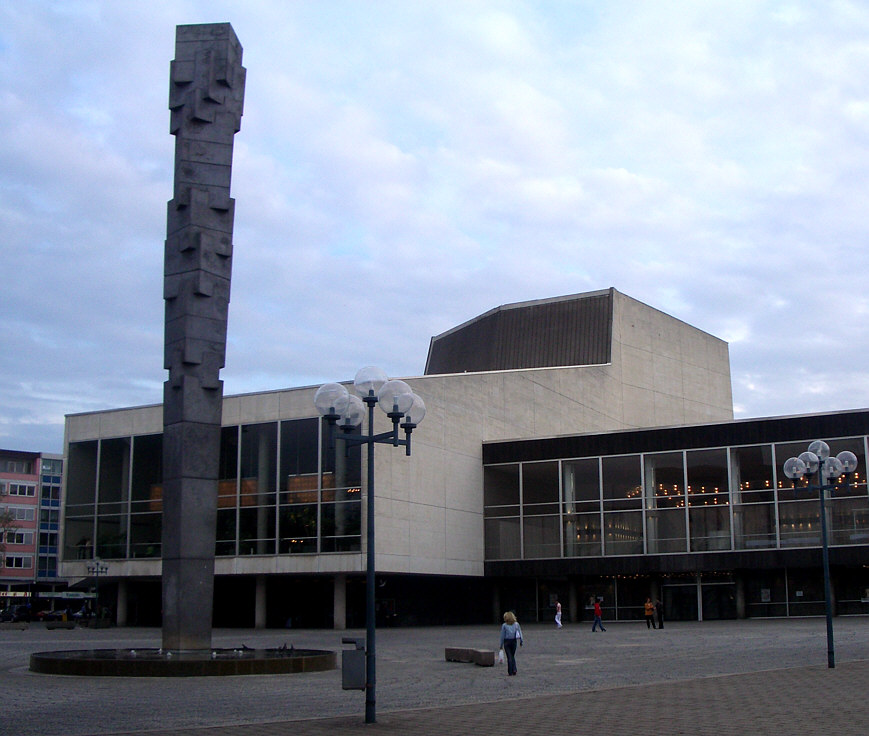
Pfalzbau

The Pfalzbau is a convention centre located in Ludwigshafen, Germany. The building is used primarily for theatre, concerts, congresses and fairs. The auditorium has a seating capacity of 1,171

The original building opened in 1928, but destroyed in a bombing raid in 1944. Subsequently, a former concert hall was used for theatrical performances until a new building was inaugurated in 1968, which stands today.

For many years, the theatre did not have its own company but hosted guest performances. Its own production company started in 1988, including a team that produces operas 25 nights each year, split between modern and Baroque or Classical works. The company is funded by the Rhineland-Palatinate government.

Some notable bands have performed at the Pfalzbau such as The Firm in 1984.
