= Am grünen Strand der Spree =

- Also known as: On the Verdant Shores of the River Spree
- Starring: Bum Krüger; Werner Lieven; Malte Jaeger; Günter Pfitzmann
- Country of origin: Germany

Production
- Production company: NWRV

Original release
- Release: 1960 – 1960

Am grünen Strand der Spree (On the Verdant Shores of the River Spree) was a 1960 five-part German television miniseries0. It was based on a novel by Hans Scholz and has been called a Straßenfeger in German, a television program that was watched by so many, the streets (Straßen) were empty (gefegt, swept clean). It was produced by German broadcaster Nord- und Westdeutscher Rundfunkverband (NWRV) in Cologne, Germany. On April 29, 2009, the film version was released on five DVDs with the five-part SWF radio play as bonus material on MP3 CD.

== Synopsis ==
The story takes place in postwar Berlin, divided into zones of occupation. Five friends meet and share their experiences during World War II.

== Cast (partial) ==
- Bum Krüger as Fritz Georg Hesselbarth
- Werner Lieven as Hans Schott
- Malte Jaeger as Hans-Joachim Lepsius
- Günter Pfitzmann as Bob Arnoldis
- Peter Pasetti
- Elisabeth Müller
- Anneli Granget

== See also ==
- List of German television series
