= Der Nachtkurier meldet... =

German TV series of the mid-1960s

- Genre: Drama
- Created by: Michael Braun
- Starring: Gig Malzacher
- Theme music composer: Bert Grund
- Country of origin: West Germany
- Original language: German
- No. of episodes: 42

Production
- Producer: Kurt Rendel
- Cinematography: Hermann Gruber
- Editor: Dorothee Maass
- Running time: 25 minutes

Original release
- Release: October 31, 1964 – July 23, 1966

Der Nachtkurier meldet… is a German bi-weekly television series that aired 42 episodes on SDR from October 31, 1964 to July 23, 1966.

== Cast ==
- Gig Malzacher: Günther Wieland, a young reporter for the newspaper Der Nachtkurier
- Ernst Konstantin: editor-in-chief Wendlberger
- Willy Semmelrogge: police inspector Stegemann
- Gerd Potyka: photographer Charly Renzmann

== List of episodes ==
=== 1964 ===
| № | # | Title | Original airdate | Writer(s) | Director |
|---|---|---|---|---|---|
| 1 | 1 | "Diebe in der Staatsgalerie" | October 31, 1964 | Curt Hanno Gutbrod | Michael Braun |
| 2 | 2 | "Keine Rettung für Ma Hamid?" | November 11, 1964 | Wilfried Schröder | Michael Braun |
| 3 | 3 | "Im letzten Augenblick" | November 28, 1964 | Werner Bardili | Michael Braun |
| 4 | 4 | "Polizisten sind auch nur Menschen" | December 12, 1964 | Michael Braun | Michael Braun |

=== 1965 ===
| № | # | Title | Original airdate | Writer(s) | Director |
|---|---|---|---|---|---|
| 5 | 1 | "Märchenhafter Gewinn" | January 9, 1965 | Helmut Pigge | Erich Neureuther |
| 6 | 2 | "Gefahr in der Lebkuchenbüchse" | January 23, 1965 | Theo van Alst | Erich Neureuther |
| 7 | 3 | "Der Drang nach dem Höheren" | February 6, 1965 | Oliver Storz | Erich Neureuther |
| 8 | 4 | "Bauherr Norske will keine Babies" | February 20, 1965 | Hans Wiese | Erich Neureuther |
| 9 | 5 | "Der Mann, der nie aufgab" | March 6, 1965 | W. P. Zibaso | Michael Braun |
| 10 | 6 | "3000 Dollar Finderlohn" | March 20, 1965 | Wilfried Schröder | Michael Braun |
| 11 | 7 | "Briefe aus dem Dunkel" | April 3, 1965 | Wilfried Schröder | Michael Braun |
| 12 | 8 | "Heiratsschwindler freigesprochen" | April 17, 1965 | Michael Braun | Michael Braun |
| 13 | 9 | "Handgranaten: Bahnsteig 11" | May 15, 1965 | Theo van Alst | Erich Neureuther |
| 14 | 10 | "Schwindel auf Raten" | May 29, 1965 | Winfried Martin Schnitzler | Erich Neureuther |
| 15 | 11 | "Autoren gesucht" | June 12, 1965 | Michael Braun | Michael Braun |
| 16 | 12 | "Herzenswünsche werden erfüllt" | June 26, 1965 | Theo van Alst | Erich Neureuther |
| 17 | 13 | "Professor Riebling reist inkognito" | July 7, 1965 | Wilfried Schröder | Michael Braun |
| 18 | 14 | "Das Betriebsfest" | July 24, 1965 | Michael Braun | Michael Braun |
| 19 | 15 | "Wendung im Mordfall Gormann" | August 7, 1965 | Georg Althammer, Karl Heinz Willschrei | Erich Neureuther |
| 20 | 16 | "Herr Dr. Groeppner – bitte melden!" | August 21, 1965 | Wilfried Schröder | Erich Neureuther |
| 21 | 17 | "Obdach für Genoveva" | September 4, 1965 | Theo van Alst | Erich Neureuther |
| 22 | 18 | "Wer sah Christa?" | September 18, 1965 | Georg Althammer, Karl Heinz Willschrei | Erich Neureuther |
| 23 | 19 | "Zirkus in Not" | October 2, 1965 | Lothar Rausch | Erich Neureuther |
| 24 | 20 | "Eine Jagd mit Pfiff" | October 16, 1965 | Paul Anders | Erich Neureuther |
| 25 | 21 | "Vor Wieland wird gewarnt" | October 30, 1965 | Wilfried Schröder | Hans Quest |
| 26 | 22 | "Erfolg durch Kleinanzeigen" | November 13, 1965 | Georg Althammer, Karl Heinz Willschrei | Hans Quest |
| 27 | 23 | "Die Praktiker haben das Wort" | November 27, 1965 | Oliver Storz | Hans Quest |
| 28 | 24 | "Ein Toter im Flamingo-Park" | December 11, 1965 | Wilfried Schröder | Hans Quest |

=== 1966 ===
| № | # | Title | Original airdate | Writer(s) | Director |
|---|---|---|---|---|---|
| 29 | 1 | "Die Chronik von Schloß Lohenstein" | January 22, 1966 | Theo van Alst | Hans Quest |
| 30 | 2 | "Außenseiter macht das Rennen" | February 5, 1966 | Georg Althammer, Karl Heinz Willschrei | Hans Quest |
| 31 | 3 | "Wer ist der Mörder?" | February 19, 1966 | Michael Braun | Michael Braun |
| 32 | 4 | "Reisebekanntschaften" | March 5, 1966 | Michael Braun | Michael Braun |
| 33 | 5 | "Der Lockvogel" | March 19, 1966 | Oliver Storz | Michael Braun |
| 34 | 6 | "Hermann und Dorothea wohlauf" | April 2, 1966 | Wilfried Schröder | Michael Braun |
| 35 | 7 | "Nobel! Nobel!" | April 16, 1966 | Werner Bardili | Michael Braun |
| 36 | 8 | "Schüsse in Schwabing" | April 30, 1966 | Georg Althammer, Karl Heinz Willschrei | Michael Braun |
| 37 | 9 | "Pockenalarm" | May 14, 1966 | Georg Althammer, Karl Heinz Willschrei | Michael Braun |
| 38 | 10 | "Selbstmord ausgeschlossen" | May 28, 1966 | Michael Braun | Michael Braun |
| 39 | 11 | "Note ungenügend" | June 11, 1966 | Werner Bardili | Michael Braun |
| 40 | 12 | "Der Mann ohne Namen" | June 25, 1966 | Georg Althammer, Karl Heinz Willschrei | Michael Braun |
| 41 | 13 | "Mord um halb zwölf" | July 9, 1966 | Wolfgang Mühlbauer | Michael Braun |
| 42 | 14 | "Kein Interview mit Rokowsky" | July 23, 1966 | Stefan Gommermann | Michael Braun |
