= Theater im Zimmer =

Theatre in Hamburg, Germany

Coordinates: 53°34′22″N 9°59′52″E

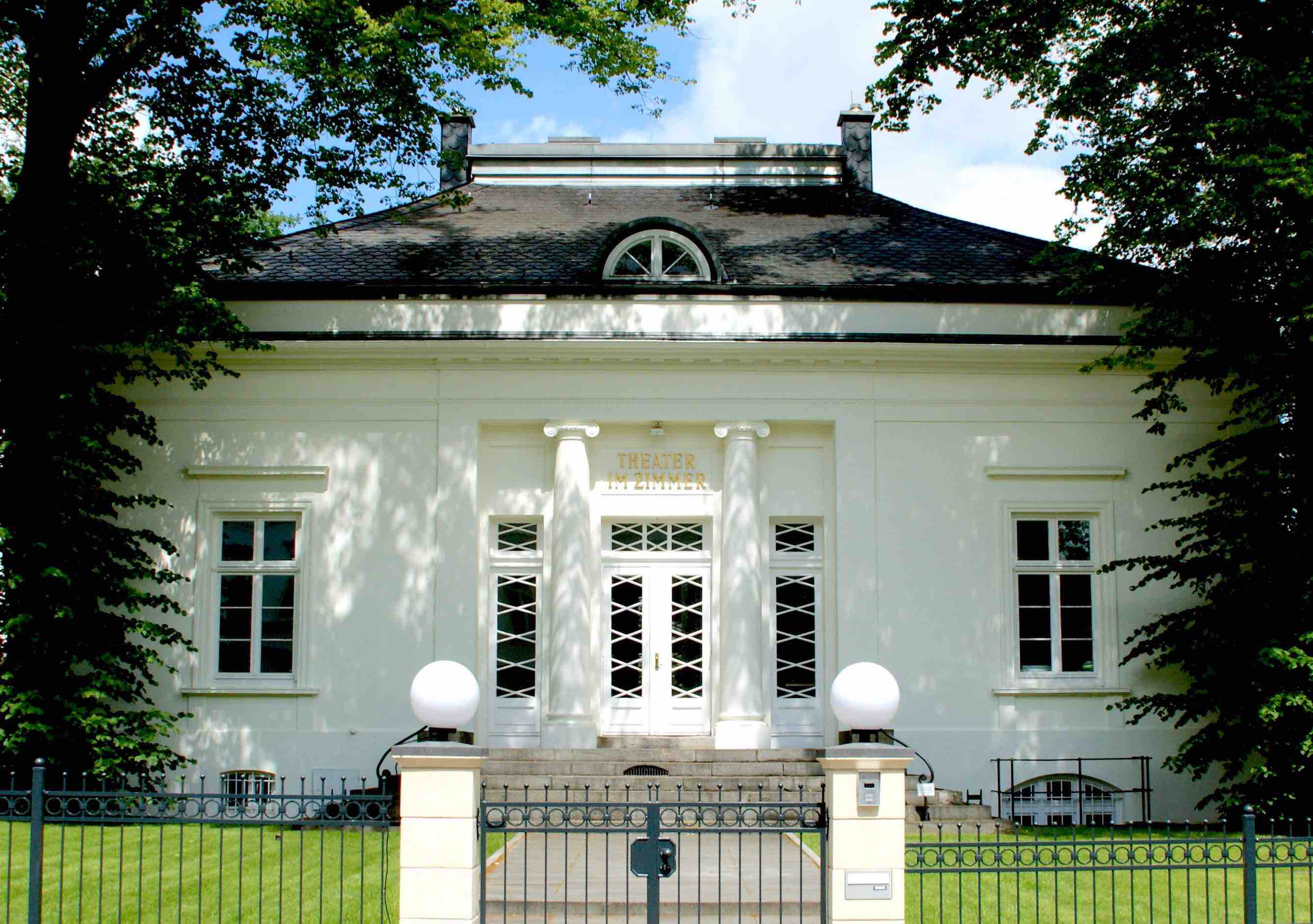
Theater im Zimmer

Theater im Zimmer is a theatre in Hamburg, Germany. After the city cut its subsidies, the theatre ceased operations in 1999. The building was sold in 2002 and is now being used for concerts by the neighboring school of music, and for theatre productions. Additionally the villa is used for exclusive corporate and private events, in order to support the cultural events, concerts and theatre.
