= Last Platoon =

- Directed by: Ignazio Dolce
- Written by: Tito Carpi
- Starring: Richard Hatch
- Cinematography: Sergio D'Offizi
- Music by: Stefano Mainetti
- Release date: 1988
- Language: English

Last Platoon (Italian: Angel Hill: l'ultima missione) is a 1988 Italian-American Vietnam war film directed by Ignazio Dolce (credited as Paul D. Robinson) and starring Richard Hatch.

== Plot ==
After a war hero's Vietnamese girlfriend vanishes he accepts a risky mission to blow up a bridge at the Vietnamese border and he is given a group of prisoners to accompany him.

== Cast ==
- Richard Hatch as Costa
- Donald Pleasence as Colonel B. Abrams
- Vassili Karis as Paco
- Milene Thy-Sanh as Mei Ling
- Anthony Sawyer
- Mike Monty
