= Leathernecks (film) =

- Directed by: Ignazio Dolce
- Written by: Tito Carpi
- Starring: Richard Hatch
- Cinematography: Guglielmo Mancori
- Music by: Stefano Mainetti
- Release date: 1989
- Country: Italy
- Language: English

Leathernecks (Italian: Colli di cuoio) is a 1989 Italian Vietnam war film directed by Ignazio Dolce (credited as Paul D. Robinson) and starring Richard Hatch.

== Plot ==
A special military unit called the Leathernecks travel to a Vietnamese village to teach the inhabitants how to defend themselves against the enemy.

== Cast ==
- Richard Hatch as Lieutenant Caldwell
- Antonio Marsina as Captain Barrett
- James Mitchum as Sergeant Martin
- Vassili Karis as Tony
- Robert Marius as Bob
- Tanya Gomez
