= Stefano Mainetti =

Italian composer and conductor (born 1957)

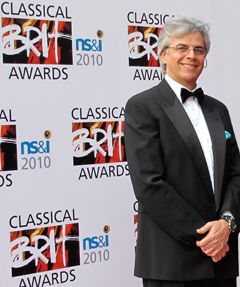
- Classic Brit Awards Best Album 2010 (Nomination)

Background information
- Born: 8 August 1957 (age 69); Rome
- Genres: Film music, classical, absolute music
- Occupations: Composer, conductor, orchestrator, music producer, guitarist
- Years active: 1983–present
- Website: www.stefanomainetti.com

Stefano Mainetti is an Italian composer and conductor.

== Biography ==
Attended Santa Cecilia Conservatory of Rome where he earned a Bachelor of Music, summa cum laude, in Composition and a 1st class honors Master of Music in Film Scoring degree. He studied Conducting with Cesare Croci and Ennio Nicotra and holds a BA, magna cum laude, in Anthropology and Political Science with a published dissertation on Richard Wagner. He was a student of Giorgio Caproni, one of the greatest 20th century Italian poet, his teacher at the primary school, who influenced his musical and artistic training.

He taught Composition and Film Scoring at the Conservatory of Santa Cecilia in Rome and is a lecturer in the Master’s Program in Music Management and Media at Roma Tre University, where he explores the relationship between music and generative artificial intelligence.

Stefano is one of the founders of the ACMF, the Italian Association of Music Composers for Films

Writes music for cinema, theatre and television. Works in Italy and the United States. One of the two composers who wrote the music for the CD Abbà Pater. Works in the United States includes writing and conducting the music for films such as The Shooter directed by Ted Kotcheff, Silent Trigger and Tale of the Mummy (Best Soundtrack award at the 18th Fantafestival), both films directed by Russell Mulcahy. "Cinemusic Ravello Festival award" in 2005 for best soundtrack of the Italian TV series Orgoglio (Pride). In 2006 and 2007 he was a member of the panel in the Sanremo Music Festival. In 2006 winner of the "Anica Award" for the soundtrack of the film "A voce alta". In 2007 was awarded the "Salvo Randone" prize for his career.

From 2007 to 2010 composed and conducted the music for The Word of Promise the US audio drama of the Bible in 79 CDs with the voices of Jim Caviezel, Richard Dreyfuss, Michael York, Jon Voight, Max von Sydow, Malcolm McDowell, Stacy Keach, Terence Stamp, Louis Gossett Jr. and 600 other actors. In 2009 was one of the composers of the music for the CD Alma Mater, performed by the Royal Philharmonic Orchestra. This work received a nomination as "Album of the Year" at the Classic Brit Awards in London 2010. In 2011 he composed and produced Tu es Christus a Sony Music cd for the beatification of Pope John Paul II in which featured, amongst others, the voices of Andrea Bocelli and Plácido Domingo. "International Euro Mediterraneo Award" in Campidoglio, Rome and "Napoli Cultural Classic Award" for Best Italian Musician in 2011.

In 2014, for Musa Comunicazione, he published the book "La politica musicale nazista e l'influenza del culto wagneriano". In 2021 he was co-author, together with Simone Corelli e Gilberto Martinelli, of the treatise "Dialoghi, Musica, Effetti: il Suono nell’audiovisivo". The book, published by Lambda, won the critics’ award at the "Premio Letterario Internazionale Città di Cattolica".

Stefano is the author of "Rendering Revolution". The project was presented at the MAXXI National Art Museum in Rome on 12 June 2017, an "augmented music" experience in which music, painting, dance and video art are blended together in a spatial setting. The project aims to be a new synthesis and fusion among different art forms. A modern melodrama, in the most extended sense of the term, a non linear process in which the result is superior to the sum of the parts and in which each component - music, dance, painting and video art - concurs in creating an augmented reality that engrosses the spectator on a multi sensory level. "Rendering Revolution", presented by the National Academy of Santa Cecilia, took two years of planning and has received the honorable mention award from Santa Cecilia Conservatory for its exceptional scientific and artistic achievement.

He is among the Italian personalities participating in the Charte 18-XXI, a collective of artists, scientists and philosophers brought together by Emmanuel Demarcy-Mota, artistic director of the Théâtre de la Ville-Paris, with the aim of promoting international theatre, with young people and for young people, through a working method and a comparison never made before in the theatrical panorama. As a demonstration of the desire shared by various cultural personalities to create a new space for discussion and dialogue, productions from all over the world participate in the project, including the Teatro della Pergola in Florence.

== Selected filmography ==
- Voglia di guardare, Joe D'Amato (1986)
- Appuntamento a Trieste, Bruno Mattei (1987)
- Interzone, Deran Sarafian (1987)
- Cartoline Italiane, Memè Perlini (1987)
- Strike Commando 2, Bruno Mattei (1988)
- Ratman, Giuliano Carnimeo (1988)
- Eurocops, Gianni Lepre (1988)
- Zombi 3, Lucio Fulci (1988)
- Leathernecks, Ignazio Dolce (1989)
- Il Ventre di Maria, Memè Perlini (1992)
- Donna d'onore 2, Ralph L. Thomas (1993)
- L'Assassino è quello con le scarpe gialle, Filippo Ottoni (1993)
- Trinità & Bambino... e adesso tocca a noi, Enzo Barboni (1995)
- The Shooter, Ted Kotcheff (1995)
- Silent Trigger, Russell Mulcahy (1996)
- Sub Down, Gregg Champion (1997)
- Tale of the Mummy, Russell Mulcahy (1998)
- Orgoglio, Giorgio Serafini (2004)TV Movie
- A voce alta, Vincenzo Verdecchi (2006)
- 15 Seconds, Gianluca Petrazzi (2008)
- Agata e Ulisse, Maurizio Nichetti (2010) TV Movie
- 100 metri dal Paradiso, Raffaele Verzillo (2011–2012)
- Le due leggi, Luciano Manuzzi (2014) TV Movie
- Maia, Alessandro Prete (2016) Short Film
- Grido per un nuovo Rinascimento, Elisa Barucchieri, Stefano Mainetti, Elena Sofia Ricci (2022)
- Il Pirata, Cristiano Ciliberti (2023)

== Symphonic Project ==
- Abbà Pater, Sony Classical USA (1999)
- The Word of Promise, USA (2007–2010) Jobe Cerny
- Alma Mater, UK (2009)
- Tu es Christus, Ita (2011) Sony Music
- Rendering Revolution, Ita (2017) Santa Cecilia Academy
