= He Was Called Holy Ghost =

1971 film

- Directed by: Roberto Mauri
- Written by: Roberto Mauri
- Starring: Vassili Karis
- Cinematography: Mario Mancini
- Music by: [Bruno Nicolai]
- Release date: 1971
- Language: Italian

He Was Called Holy Ghost (Italian: ...e lo chiamarono Spirito Santo) is a 1971 Italian Spaghetti Western-comedy film written and directed by Roberto Mauri and starring Vassili Karis. It was followed by Return of the Holy Ghost (1972), still directed by Mauri and with Karis in the title role.

== Cast ==
- Vassili Karis as Holy Ghost
- Mimmo Palmara as Sheriff
- Margaret Rose Keil as Consuela
- Jack Betts as Foster (credited as Hunt Powers)
- Jolanda Modio as Squaw
- José Torres as Steve
- Lina Franchi as Holy Ghost's Mother
