= Vassili Karis =

Greek-born Italian actor (born 1938)

- Born: Vassilj Karamesinis; 22 September 1938 (age 87); Patras, Greece
- Occupation: Actor

Vassili Karis (born Vassilis Karamesinis; 22 September 1938) is a Greek-born Italian actor, mainly active in the Spaghetti Western film genre.

== Life and career ==
Born in Patras, Karis was first active in the peplum genre, in which he was credited with his birth name or with the stage name Marco Vassilli. Adopted his definitive stage name, he got his first role of weight in 1966, in the Spaghetti Western film Five Giants from Texas. His breakout came in the early 1970s with the role of Holy Ghost ("Spirito Santo" in Italian) in a series of western comedy films. Following the decline of the western genre he slowed his activities, retiring in the mid-1990s.

== Selected filmography ==
- 3 Avengers (1964)
- I criminali della metropoli (1965)
- An Angel for Satan (1966)
- A Stranger in Paso Bravo (1968)
- Ivanhoe, the Norman Swordsman (1971)
- He Was Called Holy Ghost (1971)
- His Name Was King (1971)
- Return of Sabata (1971)
- House of 1000 Pleasures (1973)
- The Arena (1974)
- Cosmos: War of the Planets (1977)
- Cindy's Love Games (1978)
- Giallo a Venezia (1979)
- Scalps (1987)
- Last Platoon (1988)
- Leathernecks (1989)
- Women in Arms (1991)
