= Archimago =

Fictional character

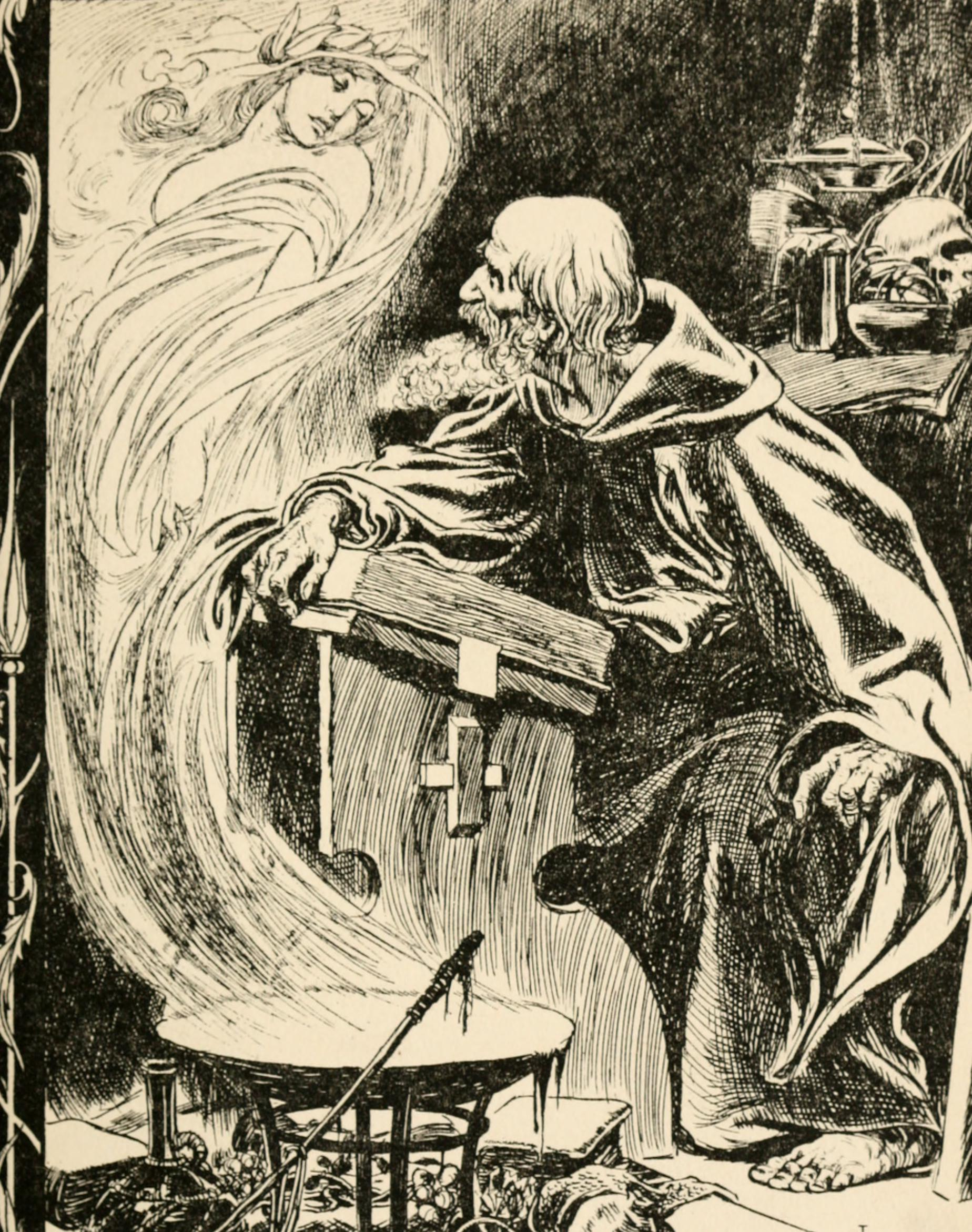
Archimago, 1905 engraving

Archimago is a sorcerer in The Faerie Queene by Edmund Spenser. In the narrative, he is continually engaged in deceitful magics, as when he makes a false Una to tempt the Red-Cross Knight into lust, and when this fails, conjures another image, of a squire, to deceive the knight into believing that Una was false to him.

== Etymology ==
His name is an amalgam of the Greek words ἄρχων and μάγος. Archon (Greek: ἄρχων, romanized: árchōn, plural: ἄρχοντες, árchontes) means "ruler", frequently used as the title of a specific public office. It is the masculine present participle of the verb stem αρχ-, meaning "to be first, to rule", derived from the same root as words such as monarch and hierarchy. Magos (Greek: μάγος, romanized: mágos, plural: μάγοι, magœ), also of Greek origin, means "wizard" or "conjurer"; it is frequently employed to describe a practitioner of black magic. Ultimately the origin of the word can be traced to Old Iranian, where according to Herodotus it is the title of Zoroastrian priests. The Greek word was transliterated into Latin as "magus", which is the origin of the English "magician".

The spelling archimage appears occasionally throughout the poem's text, however as an alternate form of the character's name, rather than a title. Percy Bysshe Shelley would later use archimage as a synonym for wizard in his poem "Letter to Maria Gisborne". This in turn led to Ursula K. Le Guin using the variant "archmage" in her novel A Wizard of Earthsea to describe the leader of a group of wizards. The term has since become common place in fantasy literature and media.

== Critical interpretation ==
One of the character's most prominent appearances is when he disguises himself as a reverend hermit, and with the assistance of Duessa (Deceit) seduces the Red-Cross Knight from Una (truth). Archimago has thus been interpreted as a symbol of religious hypocrisy, especially the rampant hypocrisy which Spenser perceived within the leadership of the Catholic Church. He has also been cited as emblematic of temptation itself and as a character who presents a mutated worldview which causes the knight to doubt the reality of their faith – the very source of their strength.
