= Abbà Pater =

Studio album by Pope John Paul II
- Released: 23 March 1999
- Genre: Classical, sacred
- Length: 49:14
- Language: Italian, Latin, English
- Label: Sony Classical
- Producer: Vincent Messina and Leonardo De Amicis
- Compiler: Pope John Paul II

Abbà Pater (English: Good Father) is a devotional album from Pope John Paul II released in 1999 in anticipation of the Great Jubilee for Radio Vaticana. The album reached #175 on the Billboard album chart. The pontiff reached #126 in 1979 with another album, "Pope John Paul II Sings At The Festival Of Sacrosong." He had also recorded a music album titled The Rosary in 1994.

== Track listing ==
All songs written by Leonardo De Amicis, except where noted:

1. "Cercate il Suo Volto" ("English: Seek His Face") – 3:03
2. "Cristo È Liberazione" ("English: Christ Is Freedom") – 3:25
3. "Verbum Caro Factum Est" ("English: The Word Became Flesh") – 1:07
4. "Abbà Pater" – 5:46
5. "Vieni, Santo Spirito" ("English: Come, Holy Spirit") – 9:24
6. "Padre, Ti Chiediamo Perdono" ("English: Father, We Ask Your Forgiveness") – 3:12
7. "Dove C'è Amore C'è Dio" ("English: Where There Is Love, There Is God") (Stefano Mainetti) – 4:06
8. "Padre Della Luce" ("English: Father of Light") – 4:26
9. "Un Comandamento Nuovo" ("English: A New Commandment") (Stefano Mainetti) – 3:00
10. "Madre di Tutte le Genti" ("English: Mother of All Mankind") – 5:37
11. "La Legge Delle Beatitudini" ("English: The Law of the Beatitudes") – 6:08

== Personnel ==
- Pope John Paul II – vocals
- Orchestra Nuova Sinfonietta Roma, conducted by Riccardo Biseo – Tracks 2–5, 8, 9–11
- Orchestra St. Caterina d'Allesandria, conducted by Leonardo De Amicis – Tracks 1 and 6
- Roman Academy Choir – Tracks 3, 4, 7, and 9
- Pablo Colino's Choir – Track 4
- Echo – Track 8
- Catharina Scharp – Vocals on tracks 3, 5, and 9

== Release history ==
Release history of Abbà Pater
Region	Date	Label	Format	Catalog
Worldwide	1999-03-23	Sony Classical	Compact Disc, Cassette tape, Minidisc	61705

== Chart performance ==
Chart performance for Abbà Pater
Chart (1999)	Peak Position
UK Albums Chart	87
US Billboard 200	175
US Top Heatseekers	6

== Certifications and sales ==
Sales certifications and figures for Abbà Pater
Region	Certification	Certified units/sales
Argentina (CAPIF)	2× Platinum	120,000^{^}
Chile	Gold	
Colombia	Gold	
France (SNEP)	Gold	100,000^{*}
Italy (FIMI)	Gold	120,000
Peru	Gold	
Poland (ZPAV)	3× Platinum	210,000^{*}
Summaries
Worldwide	—	1,200,000
^{*} Sales figures based on certification alone.^{^} Shipments figures based on certification alone.
