= The Faerie Queene =

English epic poem by Edmund Spenser

- by Edmund Spenser
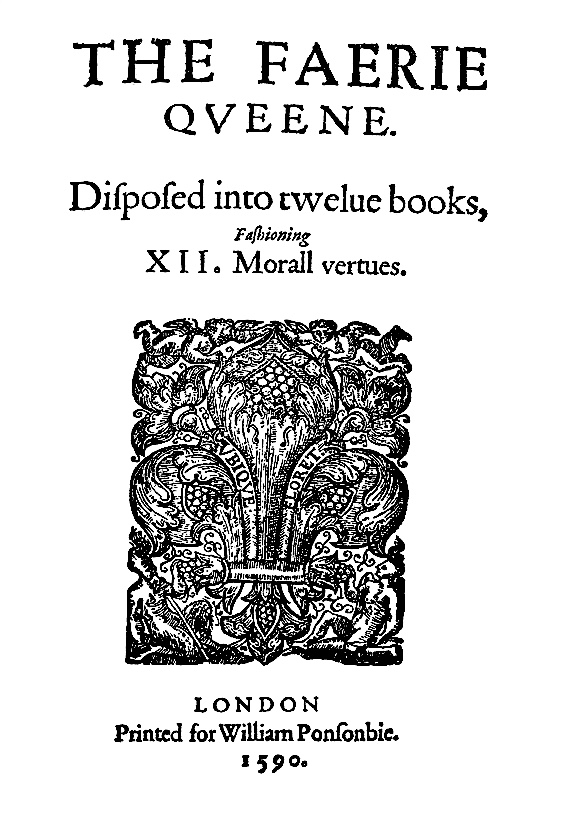
- Title page of The Faerie Queene, c. 1590
- Country: England
- Language: Early Modern English
- Genre: Epic poem
- Publication date: 1590, 1596
- Lines: Over 36,000
- Metre: Spenserian stanza

Full text
- The Faerie Queene at Wikisource

The Faerie Queene is an English epic poem by Edmund Spenser. Books I–III were first published in 1590, then republished in 1596 together with books IV–VI. The Faerie Queene is notable for its form: at 3,848 stanzas and nearly 35,000 lines, it is one of the longest poems in the English language; it is also the work in which Spenser invented the verse form known as the Spenserian stanza. On a literal level, the poem follows several knights as a means to examine different virtues. The poem is also an allegorical work. As such, it can be read on several levels, including as praise (or, later, criticism) of Queen Elizabeth I. In Spenser's "Letter of the Authors", he states that the entire epic poem is "cloudily enwrapped in Allegorical devices", and that the aim of publishing The Faerie Queene was to "fashion a gentleman or noble person in virtuous and gentle discipline".

Spenser presented the first three books of The Faerie Queene to Elizabeth I in 1589, probably sponsored by Walter Raleigh. The poem was a clear effort to gain court favour, and as a reward Elizabeth granted Spenser a pension for life amounting to £50 a year, though there is no further evidence that Elizabeth ever read any of the poem. This royal patronage elevated the poem to a level of success that made it Spenser's defining work.

== Summary ==
Signature of Edmund Spenser

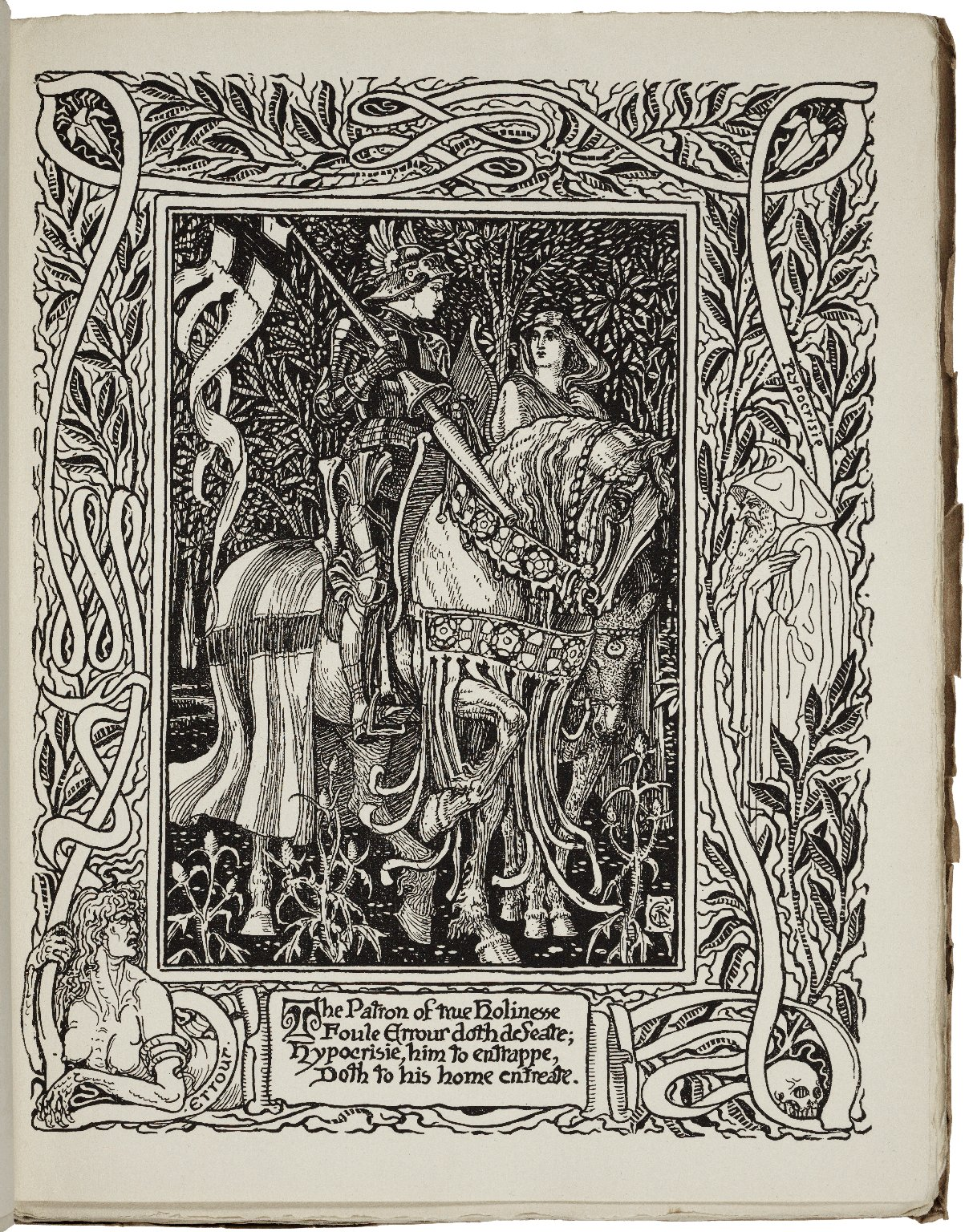
Holinesse defeats Errour: an illustration from Book I, Part l of an 1895–1897 edition

Book I is centred on the virtue of Holiness as embodied in the Redcrosse Knight. Largely self-contained, Book I can be understood to be its own miniature epic. At first, the Redcrosse Knight and his lady Una travel together when he defeats the monster Errour. Then they travel separately after the wizard Archimago, using a false dream, tricks the Redcrosse Knight into thinking that Una is unchaste. The Redcrosse Knight meets Duessa, who feigns distress in order to entrap him. Duessa leads the Redcrosse Knight to captivity by the giant Orgoglio. Meanwhile, Una seeks tirelessly to be reunited with the Redcrosse Knight.

She overcomes many perils, meets Arthur, and finally rescues the Redcrosse Knight from his capture, from Duessa, and from Despair. Una and Arthur help the Redcrosse Knight recover in the House of Holiness, with the House's ruler Caelia and her three daughters joining them. There, the Redcrosse Knight sees a vision of his future. He then returns Una to her parents' castle and rescues them from a dragon, and the two are betrothed after resisting Archimago one last time.

Book II is centred on the virtue of Temperance as embodied in Sir Guyon, who is tempted by the fleeing Archimago into nearly attacking the Redcrosse Knight. Guyon discovers a woman killing herself out of grief for having her lover tempted and bewitched by the witch Acrasia and killed. Guyon swears a vow to avenge them and protect their child. Guyon on his quest starts and stops fighting several evil, rash, or tricked knights and meets Arthur. Finally, they come to Acrasia's Island and the Bower of Bliss, where Guyon resists temptations to violence, idleness, and lust. Guyon captures Acrasia in a net, destroys the Bower, and rescues those imprisoned there.

Book III is centred on the virtue of Chastity as embodied in Britomart, a lady knight. Resting after the events of Book II, Guyon and Arthur meet Britomart, who wins a joust with Guyon. They separate as Arthur and Guyon leave to rescue Florimell, while Britomart rescues the Redcrosse Knight. Britomart reveals to the Redcrosse Knight that she is pursuing Sir Artegall because she is destined to marry him. The Redcrosse Knight defends Artegall and they meet Merlin, who explains more carefully Britomart's destiny to found the English monarchy. Britomart leaves and fights Sir Marinell. Arthur looks for Florimell, joined later by Sir Satyrane and Britomart, and they witness and resist sexual temptation. Britomart separates from them and meets Sir Scudamore, looking for his captured lady Amoret. Britomart alone is able to rescue Amoret from the wizard Busirane. Unfortunately, when they emerge from the castle Scudamore is gone. (The 1590 version with Books I–III depicts the lovers' happy reunion, but this was changed in the 1596 version which contained all six books.)

Book IV is called "The Legend of Cambell and Telamond, or Of Friendship" – but, despite its title, Cambell's companion in Book IV is actually named Triamond, and the plot does not center on their friendship; the two men appear only briefly in the story. The book is largely a continuation of events begun in Book III. First, Scudamore is convinced by the hag Ate (discord) that Britomart has run off with Amoret and becomes jealous. A three-day tournament is then held by Satyrane, where Britomart beats Artegall (both in disguise). Scudamore and Artegall unite against Britomart, but when her helmet comes off in battle Artegall falls in love with her. He surrenders, removes his helmet, and Britomart recognizes him as the man in the enchanted mirror. Artegall pledges his love to her but must first leave and complete his quest. Scudamore, upon discovering Britomart's sex, realizes his mistake and asks after his lady, but by this time Britomart has lost Amoret, and she and Scudamore embark together on a search for her. The reader discovers that Amoret was abducted by a savage man and is imprisoned in his cave. One day Amoret darts out past the savage and is rescued from him by the squire Timias and Belphoebe. Arthur then appears, offering his service as a knight to the lost woman. She accepts, and after a couple of trials on the way, Arthur and Amoret finally happen across Scudamore and Britomart. The two lovers are reunited. Wrapping up a different plotline from Book III, the recently recovered Marinell discovers Florimell suffering in Proteus' dungeon. He returns home and becomes sick with love and pity. Eventually he confesses his feelings to his mother, and she pleads with Neptune to have the girl released, which the god grants.

Book V is centred on the virtue of Justice as embodied in Sir Artegall, who defeats a demagogic giant and mediates several conflicts, including a joust held in honor of Florimell's nuptials. The knight then attempts to free several men from their indenture to the Amazon Radigund. She defeats Artegall in battle by guile, and, according to the terms of their duel, he, a stickler for legal agreements, must become her slave as well. Britomart eventually rescues her betrothed and kills Radigund, thereby restoring a just relationship of the sexes. We are introduced to the court of Mercilla, where Duessa is put on trial and found guilty. Departing from Artegall, Spenser presents Prince Arthur's quest to slay the beast Gerioneo in order to restore the lady Belge to her rights. In the final canto, Artegall aids Sir Burbon and slays the monstrous Grantorto.

Book VI is centred on the virtue of Courtesy as embodied in Sir Calidore, who is on a mission from the Faerie Queene to slay the Blatant Beast. After helping reconcile two lovers and taking on the courteous young Tristram as his page, he falls prey to the pleasant distractions of pastoral life and eventually wins the affections of Pastorella away from the ultimately agreeable but somewhat cowardly Coridon. This book also features the knight Calepine and his quest for his lady Serena, who is cared for by a strangely well-mannered Savage who, like the humble Pastorella, turns out to be a long-lost scion of nobility; Arthur later takes on Serena and leaves her to the care of his page Timias and a Hermit who has been a knight. Calidore rescues his love from the Blatant Beast, capturing and binding the monster, which nonetheless, we are told, eventually escapes to prowl about the world once more to seek the ruin of more reputations.

Published with The Faerie Queene in the Folio of 1609 and generally agreed to have been part of Spenser's plan for Book VII are the Cantos of Mutability, in which Jove's sway over the universe is challenged by Mutability, the Titan goddess of change, who takes her case to a court presided over by Nature, who, after spirited arguments on both sides, rules against the Titaness and in favor of Jove.

== Major characters ==
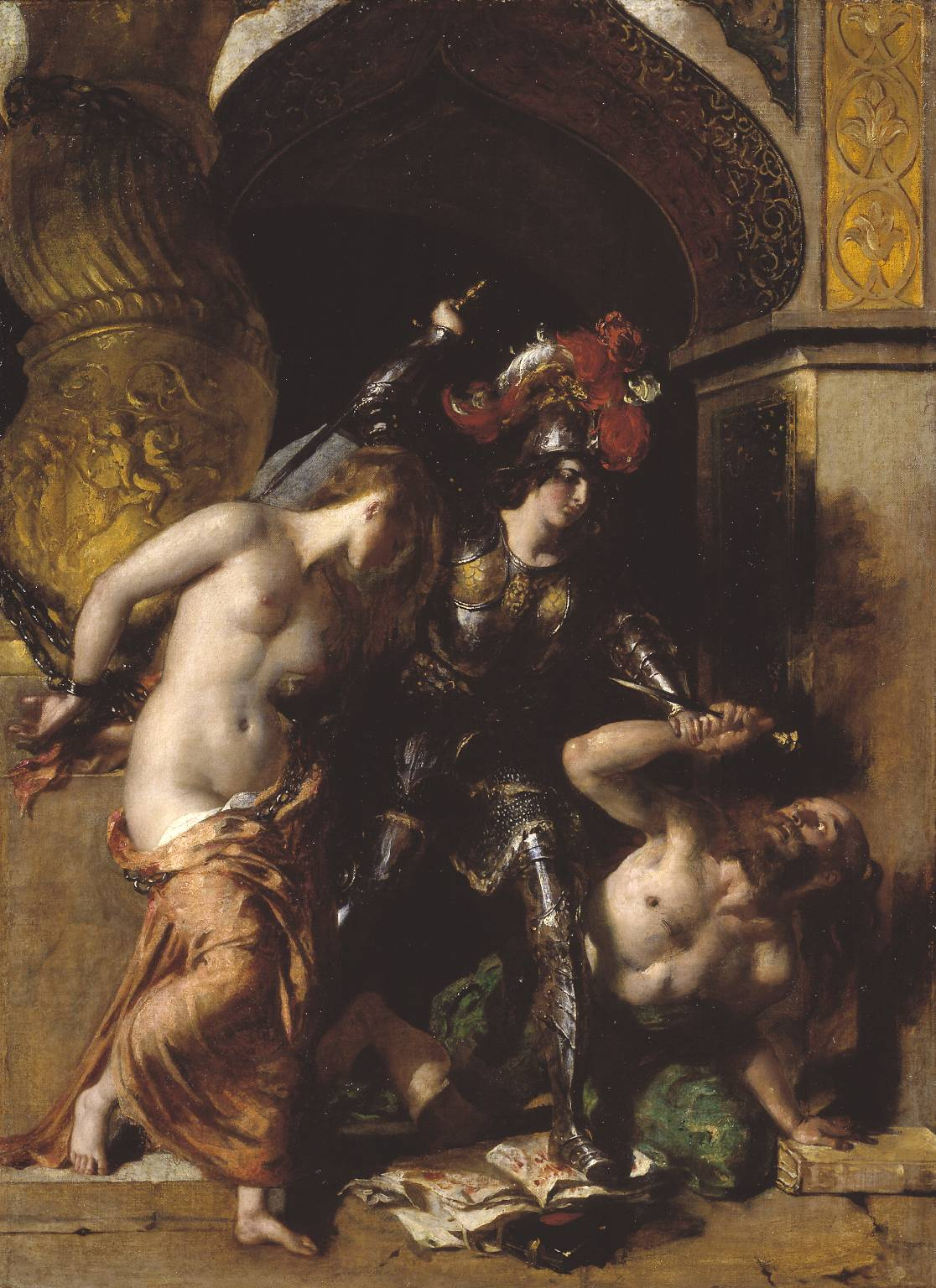
Britomart Redeems Faire Amoret by William Etty, 1833. Tate Britain, London.

- Acrasia, seductress of knights. Guyon destroys her Bower of Bliss at the end of Book 2. Similar characters in other epics: Circe (Homer's Odyssey), Alcina (Ariosto), Armida (Tasso), or the fairy woman from Keats' poem "La Belle Dame sans Merci".
- Amoret(ta), the betrothed of Scudamour, kidnapped by Busirane on her wedding night, saved by Britomart. She represents the virtue of married love, and her marriage to Scudamour serves as the example that Britomart and Artegall seek to copy. Amoret and Scudamor are separated for a time by circumstances, but remain loyal to each other until they (presumably) are reunited.
- Archimago, an evil sorcerer who is sent to stop the knights in the service of the Faerie Queene. Of the knights, Archimago hates Redcrosse most of all, hence he is symbolically the nemesis of England.
- Artegall (also spelled Artegal, Arthegal, or Arthegall), a knight who is the embodiment and champion of Justice. He meets Britomart after defeating her in a sword fight (she had been dressed as a knight) and removing her helmet, revealing her beauty. Artegall quickly falls in love with Britomart. Artegall has a companion in Talus, a metal man who wields a flail and never sleeps or tires but will mercilessly pursue and kill any number of villains. Talus obeys Artegall's command, and serves to represent justice without mercy (hence, Artegall is the more human face of justice). Later, Talus does not rescue Artegall from enslavement by the wicked slave-mistress Radigund, because Artegall is bound by a legal contract to serve her. Only her death, at Britomart's hands, liberates him. Chrysaor was the golden sword of Sir Artegall. This sword was also the favorite weapon of Demeter, the Greek goddess of the harvest. Because it was "Tempred with Adamant", it could cleave through anything.
- Arthur of the Round Table, but playing a different role here. He is madly in love with the Faerie Queene and spends his time in pursuit of her when not helping the other knights out of their sundry predicaments. Prince Arthur is the Knight of Magnificence, the perfection of all virtues.
- Ate, a fiend from Hell disguised as a beautiful maiden. Ate opposes Book IV's virtue of friendship through spreading discord. She is aided in her task by Duessa, the female deceiver of Book I, whom Ate summoned from Hell. Ate and Duessa have fooled the false knights Blandamour and Paridell into taking them as lovers. Her name is possibly inspired by the Greek goddess of misfortune Ate, said to have been thrown from Heaven by Zeus, similar to the fallen angels.
- Belphoebe, the beautiful sister of Amoret who spends her time in the woods hunting and avoiding the numerous amorous men who chase her. Timias, the squire of Arthur, eventually wins her love after she tends to the injuries he sustained in battle; however, Timias must endure much suffering to prove his love when Belphoebe sees him tending to a wounded woman and, misinterpreting his actions, flies off hastily. She is only drawn back to him after seeing how he has wasted away without her.

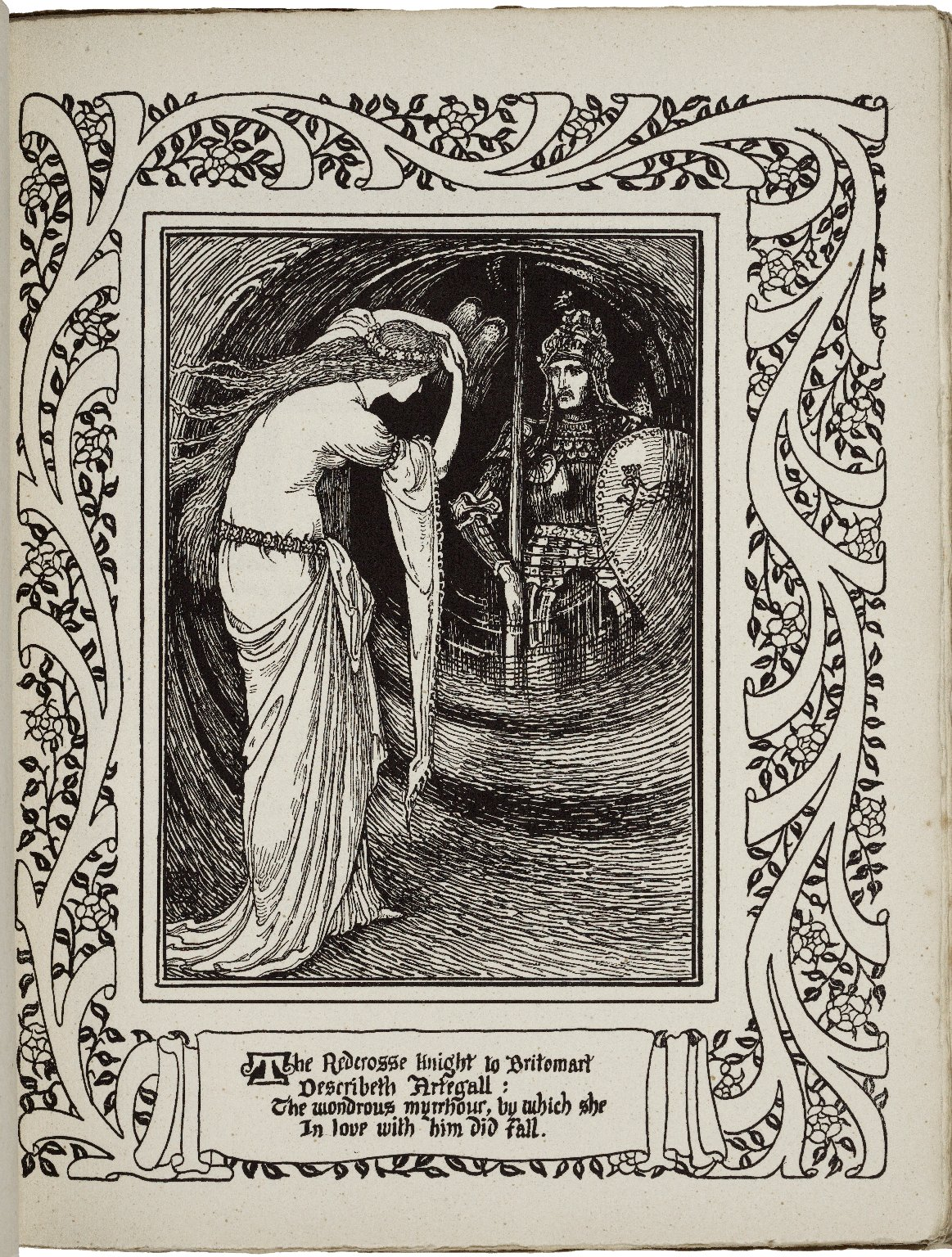
Britomart viewing Artegall by Walter Crane from Book III, Part VII of an 1895–1897 edition

- Britomart, a female knight, the embodiment and champion of Chastity. She is young and beautiful, and falls in love with Artegall upon first seeing his face in her father's magic mirror. Though there is no interaction between them, she travels to find him again, dressed as a knight and accompanied by her nurse, Glauce. Britomart carries an enchanted spear that allows her to defeat every knight she encounters, until she loses to a knight who turns out to be her beloved Artegall. (Parallel figure in Ariosto: Bradamante.) Britomart is one of the most important knights in the story. She searches the world, including a pilgrimage to the shrine of Isis, and a visit with Merlin the magician. She rescues Artegall, and several other knights, from the evil slave-mistress Radigund. Furthermore, Britomart accepts Amoret at a tournament, refusing the false Florimell.
- Busirane, the evil sorcerer who captures Amoret on her wedding night. When Britomart enters his castle to defeat him, she finds him holding Amoret captive. She is bound to a pillar and Busirane is torturing her. The clever Britomart handily defeats him and returns Amoret to her husband.
- Caelia, the ruler of the House of Holiness.
- Calidore, the Knight of Courtesy, hero of Book VI. He is on a quest from the Faerie Queene to slay the Blatant Beast.
- Cambell, one of the Knights of Friendship, hero of Book IV. Brother of Canacee and friend of Triamond.
- Cambina, daughter of Agape and sister to Priamond, Diamond, and Triamond. Cambina is depicted holding a caduceus and a cup of nepenthe, signifying her role as a figure of concord. She marries Cambell after bringing an end to his fight with Triamond.
- Colin Clout, a shepherd noted for his songs and bagpipe playing, briefly appearing in Book VI. He is the same Colin Clout as in Spenser's pastoral poetry, which is fitting because Calidore is taking a sojourn into a world of pastoral delight, ignoring his duty to hunt the Blatant Beast, which is why he set out to Ireland to begin with. Colin Clout may also be said to be Spenser himself.
- Cymochles, a knight in Book II who is defined by indecision and fluctuations of the will. He and his fiery brother Pyrochles represent emotional maladies that threaten temperance. The two brothers are both slain by Prince Arthur in Canto VIII.
- Chrysogonee, mother of Belphoebe and her twin Amoretta. She hides in the forest and, becoming tired, falls asleep on a bank, where she is impregnated by sunbeams and gives birth to twins. The goddesses Venus and Diana find the newborn twins and take them: Venus takes Amoretta and raises her in the Garden of Adonis, and Diana takes Belphoebe.
- Despair, a distraught man in a cave, his name coming from his mood. Using just rhetoric, he nearly persuades Redcrosse Knight to commit suicide, before Una steps in.
- Duessa, a lady who personifies Falsehood in Book I, known to Redcrosse as "Fidessa". As the opposite of Una, she represents the "false" religion of the Roman Catholic Church. She is also initially an assistant, or at least a servant, to Archimago. King James VI objected to the poem in 1596, apparently comparing Duessa and his mother, Mary, Queen of Scots.

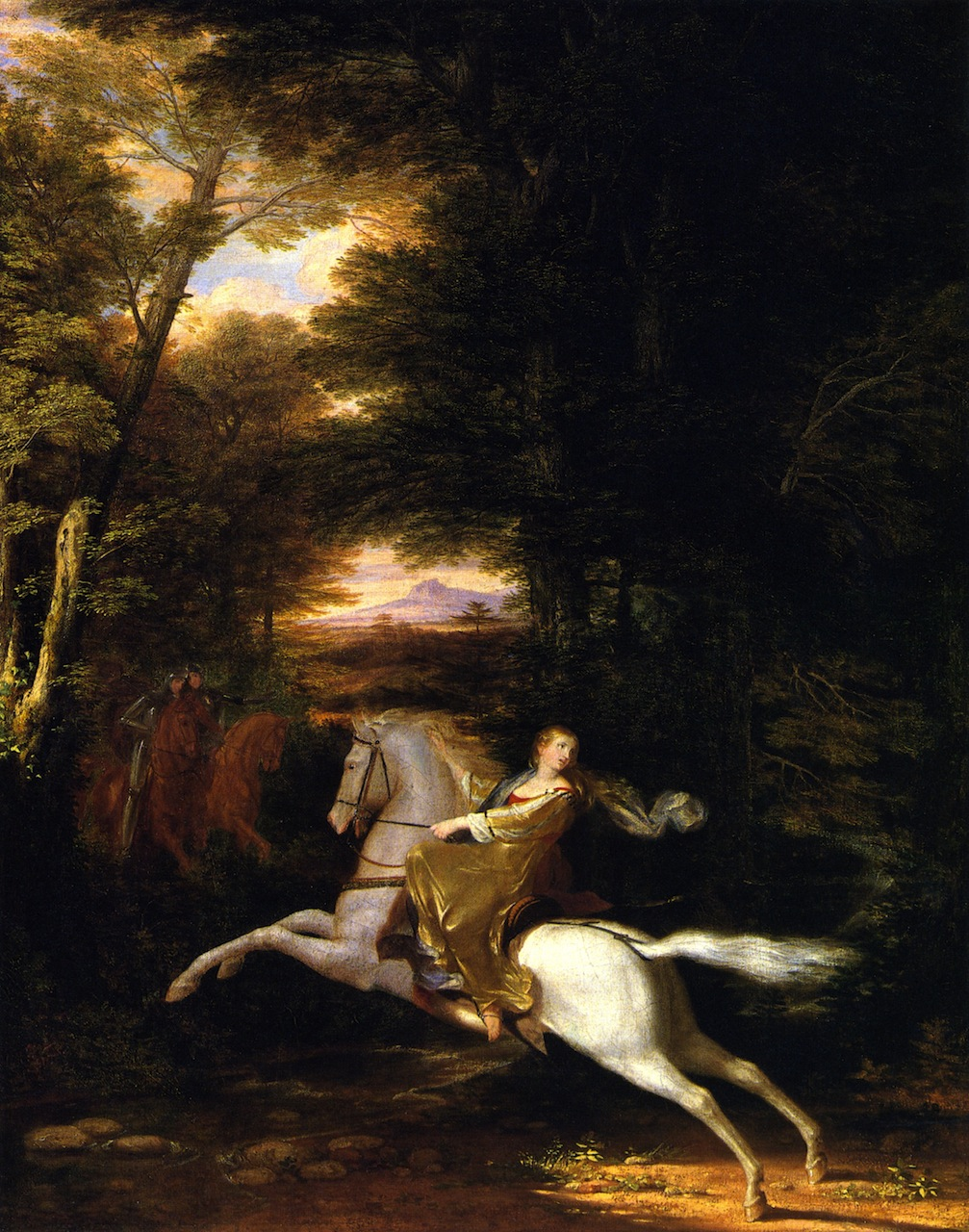
The Flight of Florimell by Washington Allston

- Florimell, a lady in love with the knight Marinell, who initially rejects her. Hearing that he has been wounded, she sets out to find him and faces various perils, culminating in her capture by the sea god Proteus. She is reunited with Marinell at the end of Book IV, and is married to him in Book V.
- Guyon, the Knight of Temperance, the hero of Book II. He is the leader of the Knights of Maidenhead and carries the image of Gloriana on his shield. According to the Golden Legend, St. George's name shares etymology with Guyon, which specifically means "the holy wrestler".

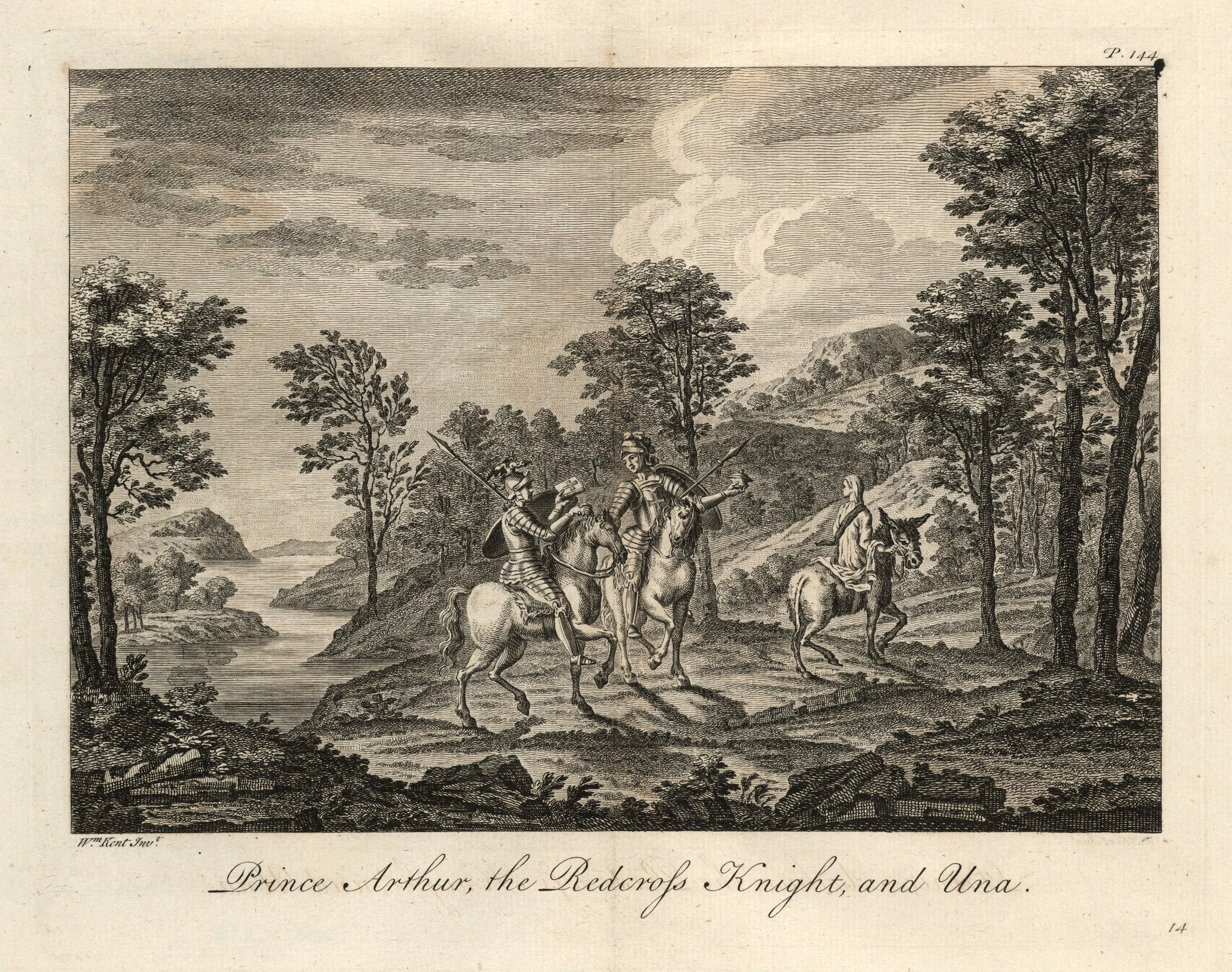
Prince Arthur, the Redcrosse Knight, and Una, illustrated by William Kent, 1751

- Marinell, "the knight of the sea"; son of a water nymph, he avoided all love because his mother had learnt that a maiden was destined to do him harm; this prophecy was fulfilled when he was stricken down in battle by Britomart, though he was not mortally wounded.
- Orgoglio, an evil giant. His name means "pride" in Italian.
- The Redcrosse Knight, hero of Book I. Introduced in the first canto of the poem, he bears the emblem of Saint George, patron saint of England, a red cross on a white background that is still the flag of England. The Redcrosse Knight is declared the real Saint George in Canto X. He also learns that he is of English ancestry, having been stolen by a Fay and raised in Faerieland. In the climactic battle of Book I, Redcrosse slays the dragon that has laid waste to Eden. He marries Una at the end of Book I, but brief appearances in Books II and III show him still questing through the world.
- Satyrane, a wild half-satyr man raised in the wild and the epitome of natural human potential. Tamed by Una, he protects her, but ends up locked in a battle against the chaotic Sansloy, which remains unconcluded. Satyrane finds Florimell's girdle, which she drops while flying from a beast. He holds a three-day tournament for the right to possess the girdle. His Knights of Maidenhead win the day with Britomart's help.
- Scudamour, the lover of Amoret. His name means "shield of love". This character is based on Sir James Scudamore, a jousting champion and courtier to Queen Elizabeth I. Scudamour loses his love Amoret to the sorcerer Busirane. Though the 1590 edition of The Faerie Queene has Scudamour united with Amoret through Britomart's assistance, the continuation in Book IV has them separated, never to be reunited.
- Talus, an "iron man" who helps Arthegall to dispense justice in Book V. The name is likely from Latin "talus" (ankle) with reference to that which justice "stands on", and perhaps also to the ankle of Achilles, who was otherwise invincible, or the mythological bronze man Talos.
- Triamond, one of the Knights of Friendship, a hero of Book IV. Friend of Cambell. One of three brothers; when Priamond and Diamond died, their souls joined with his body. After battling Cambell, Triamond marries Cambell's sister, Canacee.
- Una, the personification of the "True Church". She travels with the Redcrosse Knight (who represents England), whom she has recruited to save her parents' castle from a dragon. She also defeats Duessa, who represents the "false" (Catholic) church and the person of Mary, Queen of Scots, in a trial reminiscent of that which ended in Mary's beheading. Una is also representative of Truth.

== Themes ==
=== Allegory of virtue ===
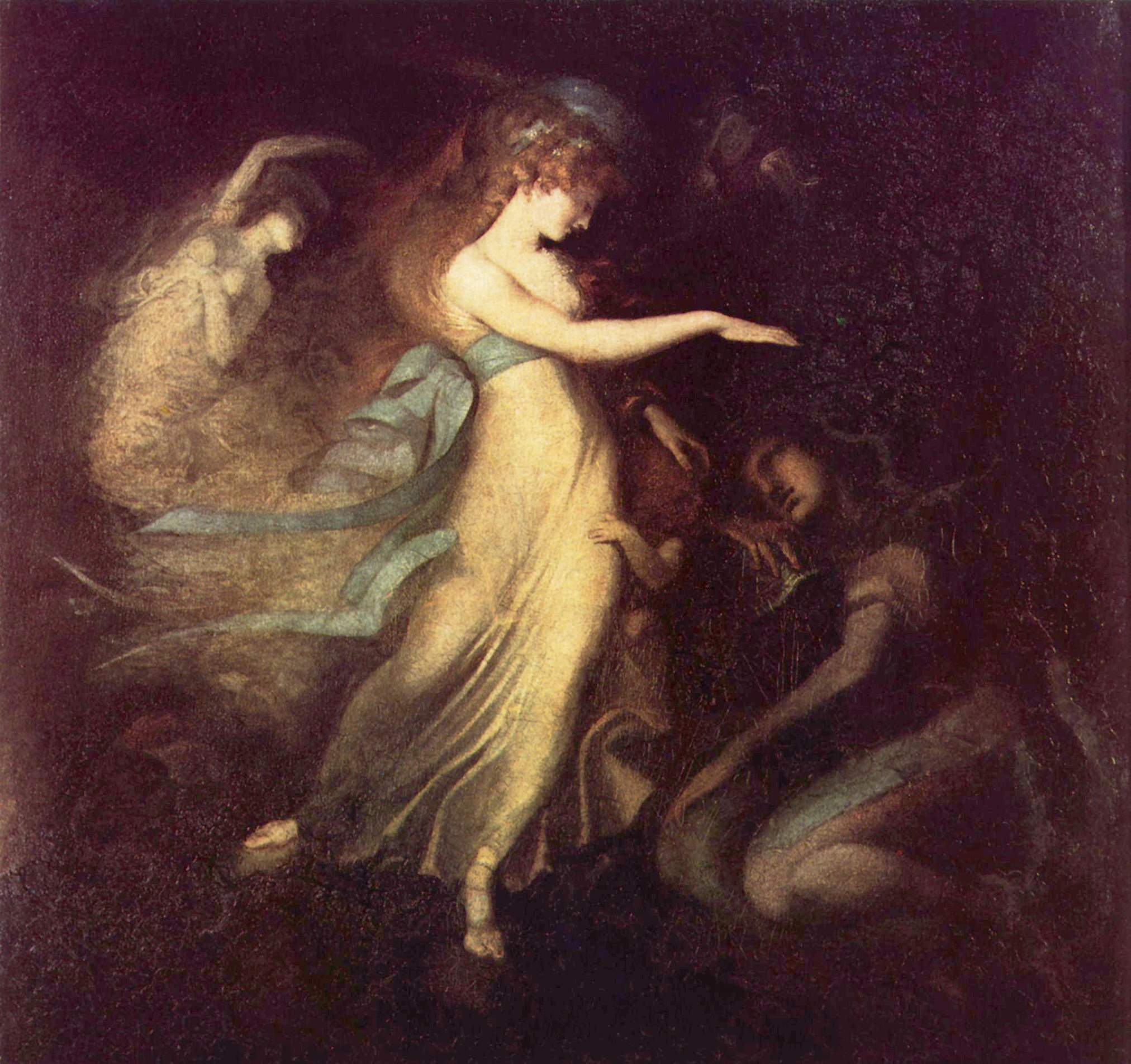
Prince Arthur and the Faerie Queen by Henry Fuseli, c. 1788.

A letter written by Spenser to Sir Walter Raleigh in 1590 contains a preface for The Faerie Queene, in which Spenser describes the allegorical presentation of virtues through Arthurian knights in the mythical "Faerieland". Presented as a preface to the epic in most published editions, this letter outlines plans for twenty-four books: twelve based each on a different knight who exemplified one of twelve "private virtues", and a possible twelve more centred on King Arthur displaying twelve "public virtues". Spenser names Aristotle as his source for these virtues, though the influences of Thomas Aquinas and the traditions of medieval allegory can be observed as well. It is impossible to predict how the work would have looked had Spenser lived to complete it, since the reliability of the predictions made in his letter to Raleigh is not absolute, as numerous divergences from that scheme emerged as early as 1590 in the first Faerie Queene publication.

In addition to the six virtues Holiness, Temperance, Chastity, Friendship, Justice, and Courtesy, the Letter to Raleigh suggests that Arthur represents the virtue of Magnificence, which ("according to Aristotle and the rest") is "the perfection of all the rest, and containeth in it them all"; and that the Faerie Queene herself represents Glory (hence her name, Gloriana). The unfinished seventh book (the Cantos of Mutability) appears to have represented the virtue of "constancy".

=== Religion ===
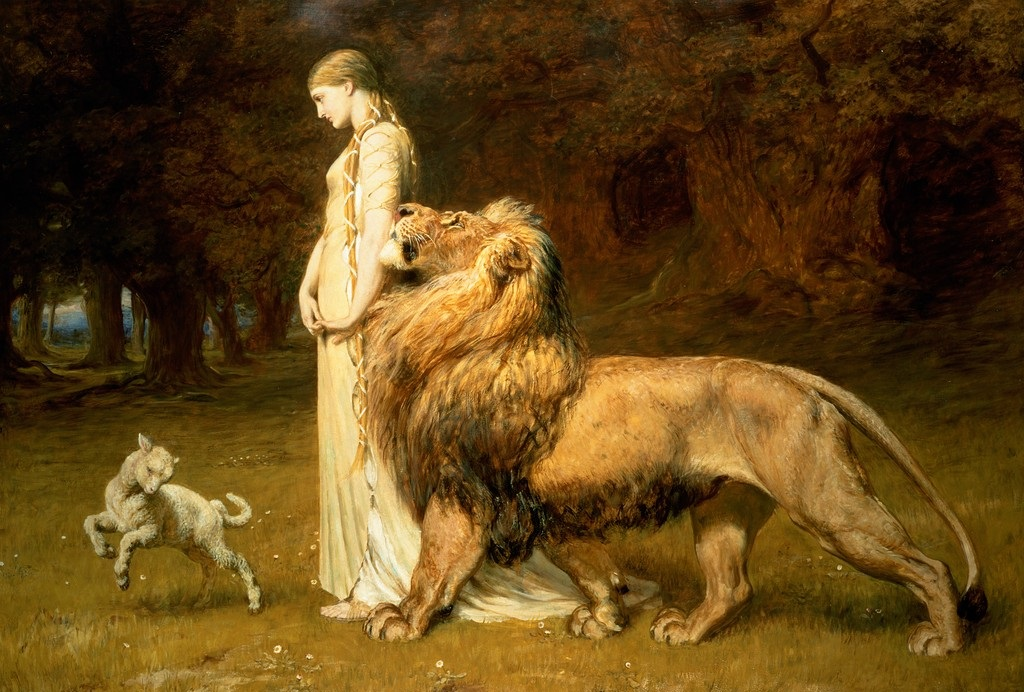
Una and the Lion by Briton Rivière (1840–1920).

The Faerie Queene was written during the Reformation, a time of religious and political controversy. After taking the throne following the death of her half-sister Mary, Elizabeth changed the official religion of the nation to Protestantism. The plot of book one is similar to Foxe's Book of Martyrs, which was about the persecution of the Protestants and how Catholic rule was unjust. Spenser includes the controversy of Elizabethan church reform within the epic. Gloriana has godly English knights destroy Catholic continental power in Books I and V. Spenser also endows many of his villains with "the worst of what Protestants considered a superstitious Catholic reliance on deceptive images".

=== Politics ===
The poem celebrates, memorializes, and critiques the House of Tudor (of which Elizabeth was a part), much as Virgil's Aeneid celebrates Augustus's Rome. The Aeneid states that Augustus descended from the noble sons of Troy; similarly, The Faerie Queene suggests that the Tudor lineage can be connected to King Arthur. The poem is deeply allegorical and allusive; many prominent Elizabethans could have found themselves partially represented by one or more of Spenser's figures. Elizabeth herself is the most prominent example. She appears in the guise of Gloriana, the Faerie Queen, but also in Books III and IV as the virgin Belphoebe, daughter of Chrysogonee and twin to Amoret, the embodiment of womanly married love. Perhaps also, more critically, Elizabeth is seen in Book I as Lucifera, the "maiden queen" whose brightly lit Court of Pride masks a dungeon full of prisoners.

The poem also displays Spenser's thorough familiarity with literary history. The world of The Faerie Queene is based on English Arthurian legend, but much of the language, spirit, and style of the piece draw more on Italian epic, particularly Ludovico Ariosto's Orlando Furioso and Torquato Tasso's Jerusalem Delivered. Book V of The Faerie Queene, the Book of Justice, is Spenser's most direct discussion of political theory. In it, Spenser attempts to tackle the problem of policy toward Ireland and recreates the trial of Mary, Queen of Scots.

=== Archetypes ===
In The Faerie Queene, Edmund Spenser employs archetypal patterns to reinforce the actuality of his narrative. Spenser integrates these patterns to focus the meaning of the past on the present, emphasizing the significance of Elizabeth's reign by converting myth into event rather than the other way around. This approach blurs the lines between archetypal and historical elements within the poem. For instance, the British Chronicle, which Arthur reads in the House of Alma, serves as a poetical equivalent for factual history despite its partially imaginary nature. This kind of poetical history is distinct from myth, as it consists of unique events recorded in chronological order. This distinction is evident in the political allegory of Books I and V, where the reality of interpreted events becomes more apparent when the events are closer to the time of the poem's composition.

Throughout The Faerie Queene, Spenser's use of archetypal patterns includes numerous mythological equivalents that enhance the narrative's depth and complexity. For example, the characters Florimell and Marinell are related to the myths of Proserpine and Adonis, respectively. Florimell, much like Eurydice, represents the pursuit of the unattainable, highlighting themes of purity and chastity. Marinell's link to Adonis underscores the fragility and vulnerability inherent in beauty and desire.

Similarly, the characters Una and Redcross can be seen as archetypal representations of divine grace and the Christian Church in England. Una, equated with Dante's Beatrice, embodies the archetype of divine wisdom and truth, guiding Redcross on his spiritual journey. This alignment with Beatrice also emphasizes Una's role as a symbol of divine grace leading to salvation. Redcross, representing the archetypal Christian Everyman, embarks on a quest that mirrors the soul's journey toward holiness. His ultimate victory over the dragon symbolizes the archetypal triumph of good over evil and the attainment of spiritual purity.

=== Symbolism and allusion ===
Throughout The Faerie Queene, Spenser creates "a network of allusions to events, issues, and particular persons in England and Ireland" including Mary, Queen of Scots, the Spanish Armada, the English Reformation, and even the Queen herself. It is also known that James VI of Scotland read the poem, and was very insulted by Duessa – a very negative depiction of his mother, Mary, Queen of Scots. The Faerie Queene was then banned in Scotland. This led to a significant decrease in Elizabeth's support for the poem. Within the text, both the Faerie Queene and Belphoebe serve as two of the many personifications of Queen Elizabeth, some of which are "far from complimentary".

Though it praises her in some ways, The Faerie Queene questions Elizabeth's ability to rule so effectively because of her gender, and also inscribes the "shortcomings" of her rule. There is a character named Britomart who represents married chastity. This character is told that her destiny is to be an "immortal womb", to have children. Here, Spenser is referring to Elizabeth's unmarried state and is touching on anxieties of the 1590s about what would happen after her death since the kingdom had no heir.

The Faerie Queene's original audience would have been able to identify many of the poem's characters by analyzing the symbols and attributes that spot Spenser's text. For example, readers would immediately know that "a woman who wears scarlet clothes and resides along the Tiber River represents the Roman Catholic Church". However, marginal notes jotted in early copies of The Faerie Queene suggest that Spenser's contemporaries were unable to come to a consensus about the precise historical referents of the poem's "myriad figures". Sir Walter Raleigh's wife identified many of the poem's female characters as "allegorical representations of herself". Other symbols prevalent in The Faerie Queene are the numerous animal characters present in the poem. They take the role of "visual figures in the allegory and in illustrative similes and metaphors". Examples include the swine present in Lucifera's castle who embodied gluttony, and Duessa, the deceitful crocodile who may represent Mary, Queen of Scots, in a negative light.

The House of Busirane episode in Book III in The Faerie Queene is partially based on an early modern English folktale called "Mr Fox's Mottos". In the tale, a young woman named Lady Mary has been enticed by Mr Fox, who resembles Bluebeard in his manner of killing his wives. She defeats Mr. Fox and tells about his deeds. Notably, Spenser quotes the story as Britomart makes her way through the House, with warning mottos above each doorway "Be bold, be bold, but not too bold".

== Composition ==
=== Spenser's intentions ===
While writing his poem, Spenser strove to avoid "gealous opinions and misconstructions" because he thought it would place his story in a "better light" for his readers. Spenser stated in his letter to Raleigh, published with the first three books, that "the general end of the book is to fashion a gentleman or noble person in virtuous and gentle discipline". Spenser considered his work "a historical fiction" which men should read for "delight" rather than "the profit of the ensample". The Faerie Queene was written for Elizabeth to read and was dedicated to her. However, there are dedicatory sonnets in the first edition to many powerful Elizabethan figures.

Spenser addresses "Lodwick" in Amoretti 33, when talking about The Faerie Queene still being incomplete. This could be either his friend Lodowick Bryskett or his long-deceased Italian model Ludovico Ariosto, whom he praises in "Letter to Raleigh".

=== Dedication ===
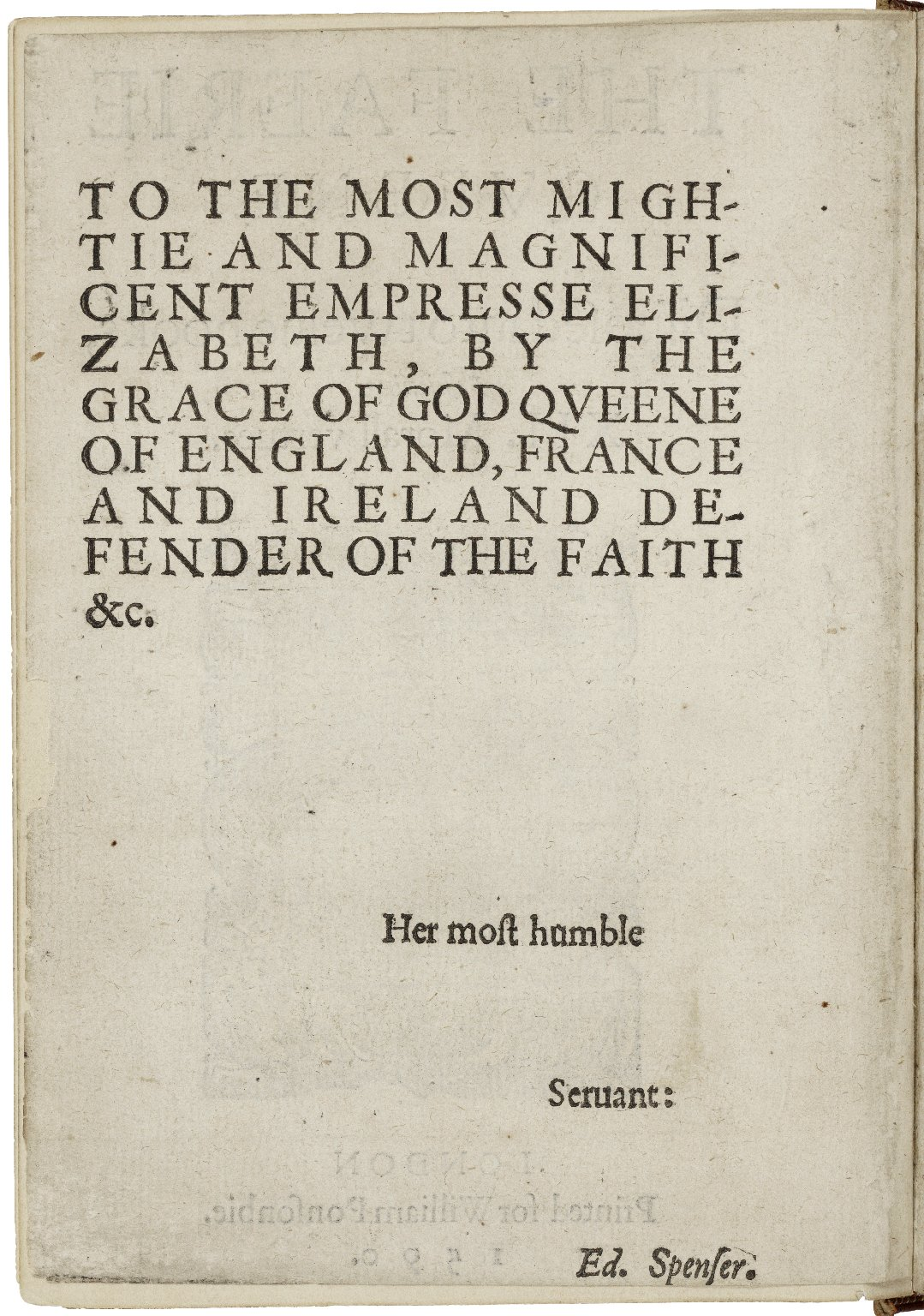
The dedicatory page of the 1590 edition of Spenser's Faerie Queene, reading: "To the most mightie and magnificent Empresse Elizabeth, by the grace of god, Queene of England, France and Ireland Defender of the Faith &c."

The poem is dedicated to Elizabeth I, who is represented in the poem as the Faerie Queene Gloriana, as well as the character Belphoebe. Spenser prefaces the poem with sonnets additionally dedicated to Sir Christopher Hatton, Lord Burleigh, the Earl of Oxford, the Earl of Northumberland, the Earl of Cumberland, the Earl of Essex, the Earl of Ormond and Ossory, High Admiral Charles Howard, Lord Hunsdon, Lord Grey of Wilton, Lord Buckhurst, Sir Francis Walsingham, Sir John Norris, Sir Walter Raleigh, the Countess of Pembroke (on the subject of her brother Sir Philip Sidney), and Lady Carew.

=== Social commentary ===
In October 1589, after nine years in Ireland, Spenser voyaged to England and saw the Queen. It is possible that he read to her from his manuscript at this time. On 25 February 1591, the Queen gave him a pension of fifty pounds per year. He was paid in four instalments on 25 March, 24 June, 29 September, and 25 December. After the first three books of The Faerie Queene were published in 1590, Spenser found himself disappointed in the monarchy; among other things, "his annual pension from the Queen was smaller than he would have liked" and his humanist perception of Elizabeth's court "was shattered by what he saw there". Despite these frustrations, however, Spenser "kept his aristocratic prejudices and predispositions". Book VI stresses that there is "almost no correlation between noble deeds and low birth" and reveals that to be a "noble person", one must be a "gentleman of choice stock".

Throughout The Faerie Queene, virtue is seen as "a feature for the nobly born" and within Book VI, readers encounter worthy deeds that indicate aristocratic lineage. An example of this is the hermit to whom Arthur brings Timias and Serena. Initially, the man is considered a "goodly knight of a gentle race" who "withdrew from public service to religious life when he grew too old to fight". Here, we note the hermit's noble blood seems to have influenced his gentle, selfless behaviour. Likewise, audiences acknowledge that young Tristram "speaks so well and acts so heroically" that Calidore "frequently contributes him with noble birth" even before learning his background; in fact, it is no surprise that Tristram turns out to be the son of a king, explaining his profound intellect. However, Spenser's most peculiar example of noble birth is demonstrated through the characterization of the Salvage Man. Using the Salvage Man as an example, Spenser demonstrated that "ungainly appearances do not disqualify one from noble birth". By giving the Salvage Man a "frightening exterior", Spenser stresses that "virtuous deeds are a more accurate indication of gentle blood than physical appearance.

On the opposite side of the spectrum, The Faerie Queene indicates qualities such as cowardice and discourtesy that signify low birth. During his initial encounter with Arthur, Turpine "hides behind his retainers, chooses ambush from behind instead of direct combat, and cowers to his wife, who covers him with her voluminous skirt". These actions demonstrate that Turpine is "morally emasculated by fear" and furthermore, "the usual social roles are reversed as the lady protects the knight from danger. Scholars believe that this characterization serves as "a negative example of knighthood" and strives to teach Elizabethan aristocrats how to "identify a commoner with political ambitions inappropriate to his rank".

=== Poetic structure ===
The Faerie Queene was written in Spenserian stanza, which Spenser created specifically for The Faerie Queene. Spenser varied existing epic stanza forms, the rhyme royal used by Chaucer with the rhyme pattern ABABBCC, and the ottava rima with the rhyme pattern ABABABCC. Spenser's stanza is the longest of the three, with nine iambic lines. The first eight lines are five-footed, that is, pentameters. The ninth line is six-footed, that is, a hexameter, or Alexandrine. Altogether these form two "interlocking quatrains and a final couplet". The rhyme pattern is ABABBCBCC. Over two thousand stanzas were written for the 1590 Faerie Queene.

=== Theological structure ===
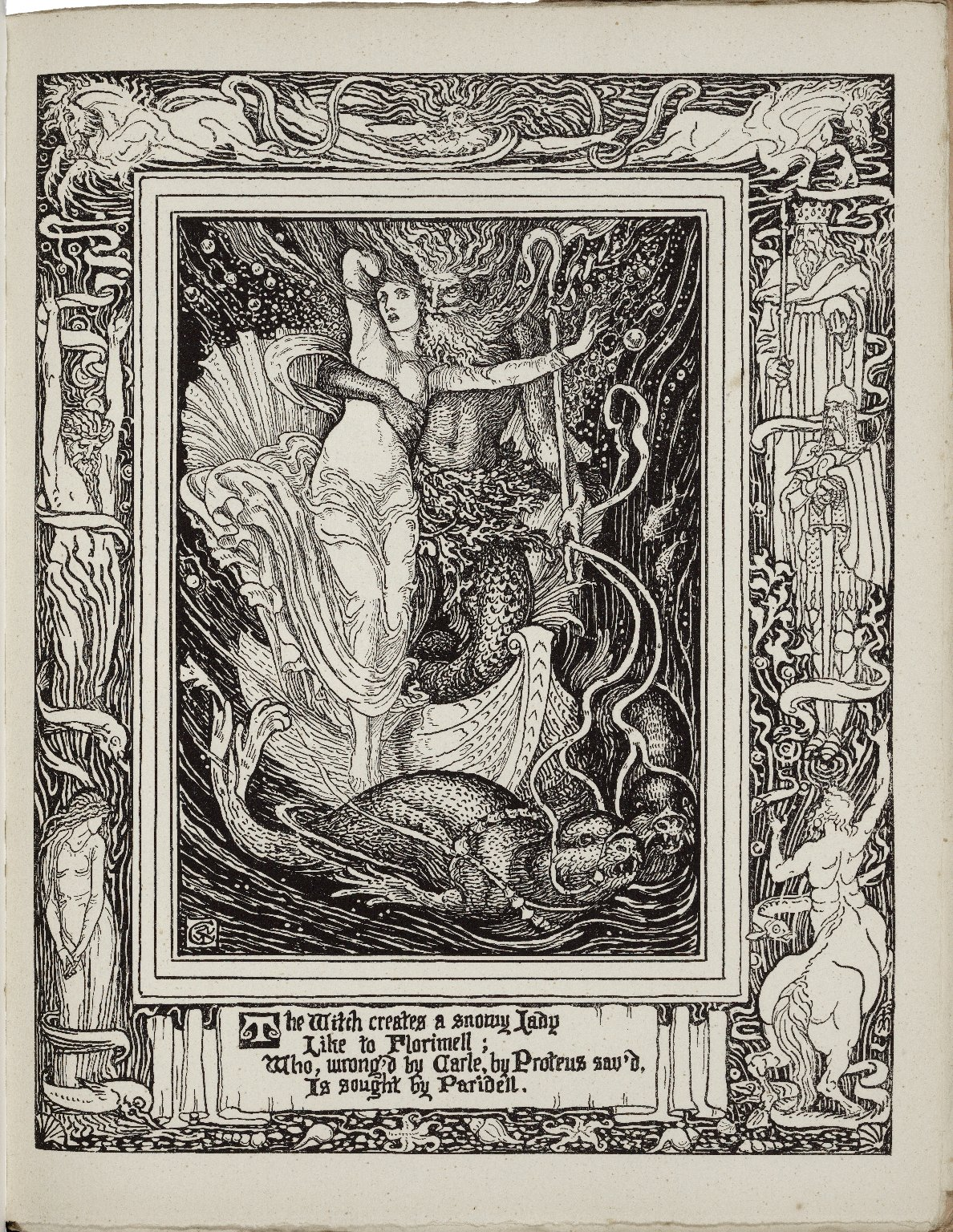
Florimell saved by Proteus by Walter Crane, from book III, Part VII of an 1895–1897 edition

In Elizabethan England, no subject was more familiar to writers than theology. Elizabethans learned to embrace religious studies in petty school, where they "read from selections from the Book of Common Prayer and memorized Catechisms from the Scriptures". This influence is evident in Spenser's text, as demonstrated in the moral allegory of Book I. Here, allegory is organized in the traditional arrangement of Renaissance theological treatises and confessionals. While reading Book I, audiences first encounter original sin, justification and the nature of sin before analysing the church and the sacraments. Despite this pattern, Book I is not a theological treatise; within the text, "moral and historical allegories intermingle" and the reader encounters elements of romance. However, Spenser's method is not "a rigorous and unyielding allegory", but "a compromise among conflicting elements". In Book I of The Faerie Queene the discussion of the path to salvation begins with original sin and justification, skipping past initial matters of God, the Creeds, and Adam's fall from grace. This literary decision is pivotal because these doctrines "center the fundamental theological controversies of the Reformation".

== Sources ==
=== Myth and history ===
During The Faerie Queene's inception, Spenser worked as a civil servant, in "relative seclusion from the political and literary events of his day". As Spenser laboured in solitude, The Faerie Queene manifested within his mind, blending his experiences into the content of his craft. Within his poem, Spenser explores human consciousness and conflict, relating to a variety of genres including sixteenth century Arthurian literature. The Faerie Queene was influenced strongly by Italian works, as were many other works in England at that time. The Faerie Queene draws heavily on Ariosto and Tasso.

The first three books of The Faerie Queene operate as a unit, representing the entire cycle from the fall of Troy to the reign of Elizabeth. Using in medias res, Spenser introduces his historical narrative at three different intervals, using chronicle, civil conversation, and prophecy as its occasions.

Despite the historical elements of his text, Spenser is careful to label himself a historical poet as opposed to a historiographer. Spenser notes this differentiation in his letter to Raleigh, noting "a Historiographer discourseth of affairs orderly as they were done ... but a Poet thrusteth into the midst ... and maketh a pleasing Analysis of all".

Spenser's characters embody Elizabethan values, highlighting political and aesthetic associations of Tudor Arthurian tradition in order to bring his work to life. While Spenser respected British history and "contemporary culture confirmed his attitude", his literary freedom demonstrates that he was "working in the realm of mythopoeic imagination rather than that of historical fact". In fact, Spenser's Arthurian material serves as a subject of debate, intermediate between "legendary history and historical myth" offering him a range of "evocative tradition and freedom that historian's responsibilities preclude". Concurrently, Spenser adopts the role of a sceptic, reflected in the way in which he handles the British history, which "extends to the verge of self-satire".

=== Medieval subject matter ===
The Faerie Queene owes, in part, its central figure, Arthur, to a medieval writer, Geoffrey of Monmouth. In his Prophetiae Merlini ("Prophecies of Merlin"), Geoffrey's Merlin proclaims that the Saxons will rule over the Britons until the "Boar of Cornwall" (Arthur) again restores them to their rightful place as rulers. The prophecy was adopted by the Welsh and eventually used by the Tudors. Through their ancestor, Owen Tudor, the Tudors had Welsh blood, through which they claimed to be descendants of Arthur and rightful rulers of Britain. The tradition begun by Geoffrey of Monmouth set the perfect atmosphere for Spenser's choice of Arthur as the central figure and natural bridegroom of Gloriana.

== Language and diction ==
=== Archaisms ===
Spenser's language in The Faerie Queene, as in the earlier The Shepheardes Calender, is in part deliberately archaic. Seventeenth-century philologist Sir William Davenant considered Spenser's use of "obsolete language" as the "most vulgar accusation that is laid to his charge". Samuel Johnson found Spenser's writings "a useful source for obsolete and archaic words", but also asserted that "in affecting the ancients Spenser writ no language". Herbert Wilfred Sugden argues in The Grammar of Spenser's Faerie Queene that the archaisms reside "chiefly in vocabulary, to a high degree in spelling, to some extent in the inflexions, and only slightly in the syntax".

Examples of medieval archaisms (in morphology and diction) include:

- Infinitive in -en: vewen 1. 201, "to view";
- Prefix y- retained in participle: yclad, 1. 58, 254, "clad, clothed";
- Adjective: combrous, 1. 203, "harassing, troublesome";
- Verb: keepe, 1. 360, "heed, give attention to".

Allowing that Johnson's remark may only apply to Spenser's Calender, Bruce Robert McElderry Jr. states, after a detailed investigation of The Faerie Queene's diction, that Johnson's statement "is a skillful epigram; but it seriously misrepresents the truth if taken at anything like its face value". The number of archaisms used in the poem is not overwhelming—one source reports thirty-four in Canto I of Book I, that is, thirty-four words out of a total forty-two hundred words, less than one percent. According to McElderry, language alone does not account for the poem's archaic tone. "The subject-matter of The Faerie Queene is itself the most powerful factor in creating the impression of archaism."

=== Classical references ===
The Faerie Queene relies on classical vocabulary and proper names, especially in the later books. Spenser coined names based on Greek, such as "Poris" and "Phao lilly-white".

One scholar argued that both classical epic literature and Spenser's work "involve[s] the principles of imitation and decorum", which explains and justifies the use of classical vocabulary and forms.

=== Overall assessment ===
Spenser is "a conscious literary artist", and his language is "the only fitting vehicle for his tone of thought and feelings". Spenser's language may be contrasted with that of the "free and unregulated" grammar of Shakespeare. Overall, Spenser's style is standardized, lyrically sophisticated and occasionally archaic, all of which give the poem its character.

== Adaptation and derivative works ==
Numerous adaptations in the form of children's literature have been made – the work was a popular choice in the 19th and early 20th century with over 20 different versions written, with the earliest being E. W. Bradburn's Legends from Spencer's Fairy Queen, for Children (1829), written in the form of a dialogue between mother and children. 19th-century adaptations often concentrated on the moral aspect of the tale. Adaptions of the work were more popular in the United Kingdom than in the United States.

The Edwardian era was particularly rich in adaptation for children, and the works richly illustrated, with contributing artists including A. G. Walker, Gertrude Demain Hammond, T. H. Robinson, Frank C. Papé, Brinsley Le Fanu, and H. J. Ford. Additionally, Walter Crane illustrated a six-volume collection of the complete work, published 1897, considered a great example of the Arts and Crafts movement.

In "The Mathematics of Magic", the second of Fletcher Pratt and L. Sprague de Camp's Harold Shea stories, the modern American adventurers Harold Shea and Reed Chalmers visit the world of The Faerie Queene, where they discover that the greater difficulties faced by Spenser's knights in the later portions of the poem are explained by the evil enchanters of the piece having organized a guild to more effectively oppose them. Shea and Chalmers reveal this conspiracy to the knights and assist in its overthrow. In the process, Belphebe and Florimel of Faerie become respectively the wives of Shea and Chalmers and accompany them on further adventures in other worlds of myth and fantasy.

A considerable part of Elizabeth Bear's "Promethean Age" series takes place in a Kingdom of Faerie which is loosely based on the one described by Spenser. As depicted by Bear, Spenser was aware of this Kingdom's existence and his work was actually a description of fact rather than invented fantasy; Queen Elizabeth I had a secret pact of mutual help with the Queen of Faerie; and such historical characters as Christopher Marlowe and William Shakespeare visited Faerie and had adventures there.

According to Richard Simon Keller, George Lucas's Star Wars film also contains elements of a loose adaptation, as well as being influenced by other works, with parallels including the story of the Red Cross Knight championing Una against the evil Archimago in the original compared with Lucas's Luke Skywalker, Princess Leia, and Darth Vader. Keller sees extensive parallels between the film and book one of Spenser's work, stating "[A]lmost everything of importance that we see in the Star Wars movie has its origin in The Faerie Queene, from small details of weaponry and dress to large issues of chivalry and spirituality".

== References in popular culture ==
The Netflix series The Crown references The Faerie Queene and Gloriana in season 1 episode 10, entitled "Gloriana". In the final scene, Queen Elizabeth II, portrayed by Claire Foy, is being photographed. Prompting Her Majesty's poses, Cecil Beaton says:

"All hail sage Lady, whom a grateful Isle hath blessed." Not moving, not breathing. Our very own goddess. Glorious Gloriana. Forgetting Elizabeth Windsor now. Now only Elizabeth Regina. Yes.

Near the end of the 1995 adaptation of Sense and Sensibility, Colonel Brandon reads The Faerie Queene aloud to Marianne Dashwood.

Quotes from the poem are used as epigraphs in Troubled Blood by Robert Galbraith, a pen name of J. K. Rowling.

In the Thursday Next series by Jasper Fforde, Granny Next (who is an older version of Thursday Next herself) is condemned to reading the "ten most boring classics" before she can die. She finally passes away after reading The Faerie Queene.

An early, influential text-based computer game that was based on the Star Trek television show, originally entitled Star Trek and later Super Star Trek, was published in 1971 by Mike Mayfield. In one of the first instances of respawning in a computer game, the player could abandon ship if the USS Enterprise became too damaged to continue fighting, in which case the replacement ship was named the Faerie Queene.

== Gallery ==
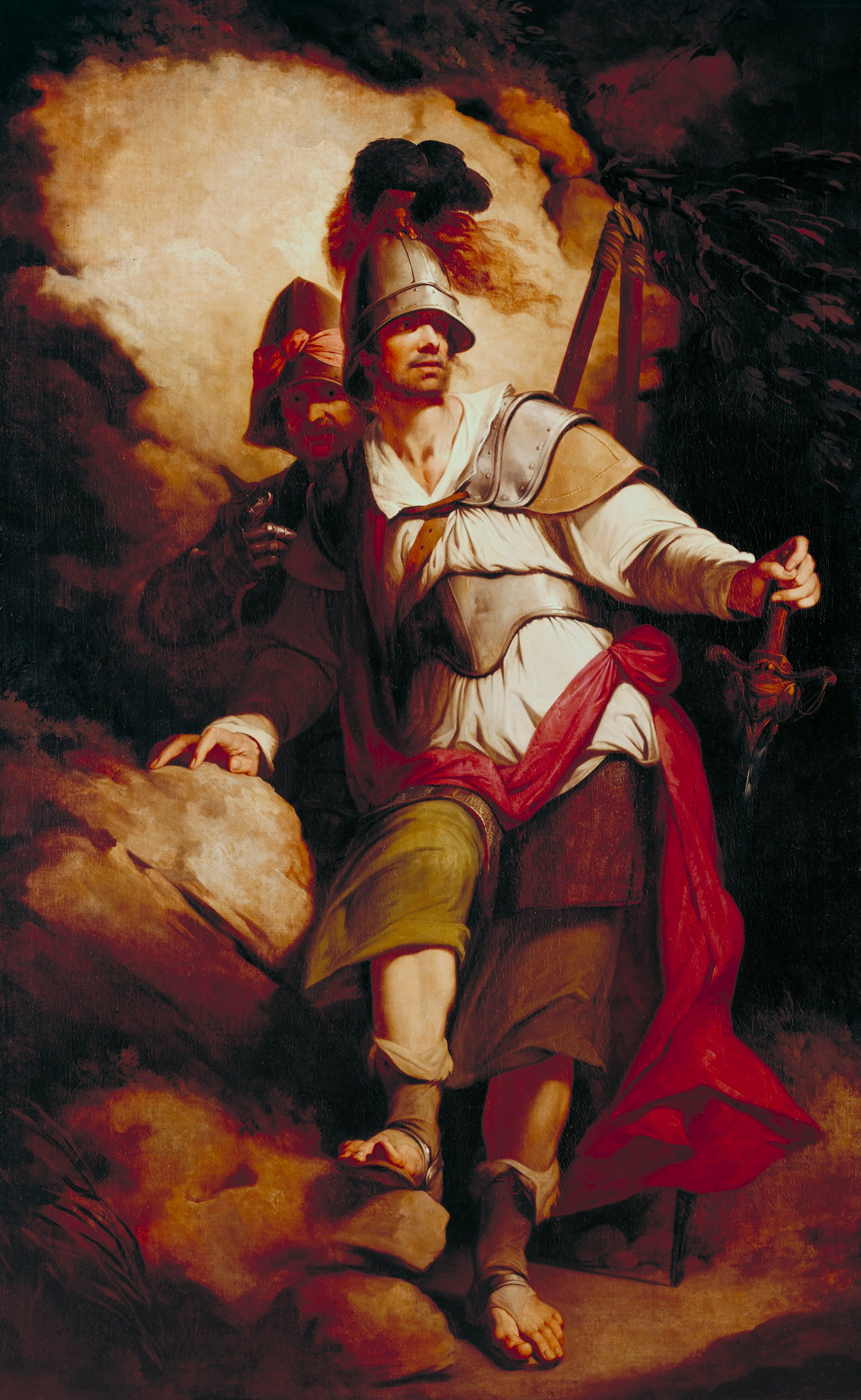
Sir Arthegal, the Knight of Justice, with Talus, the Iron Man by John Hamilton Mortimer, 1778

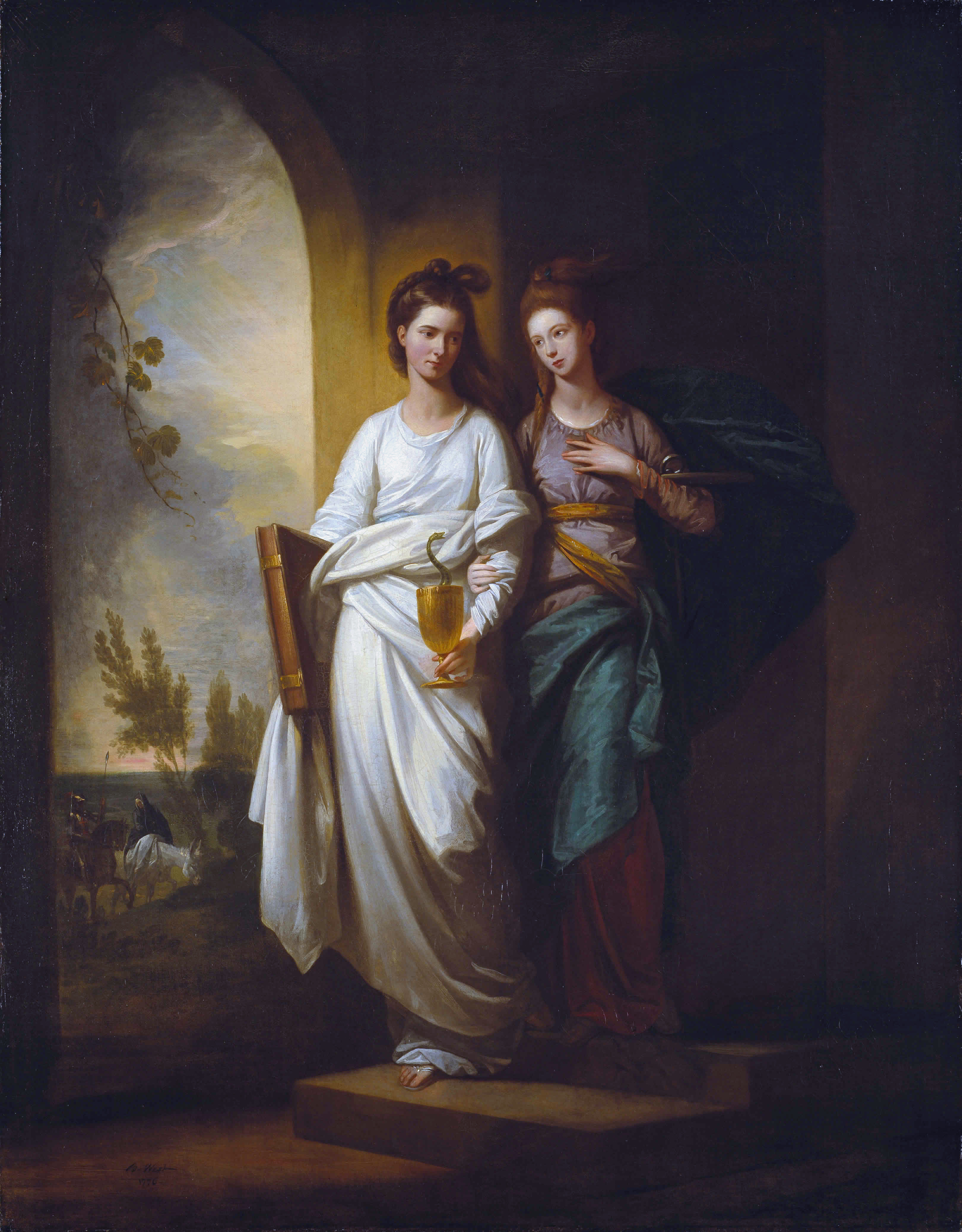
Fidelia and Speranza by Benjamin West, 1776

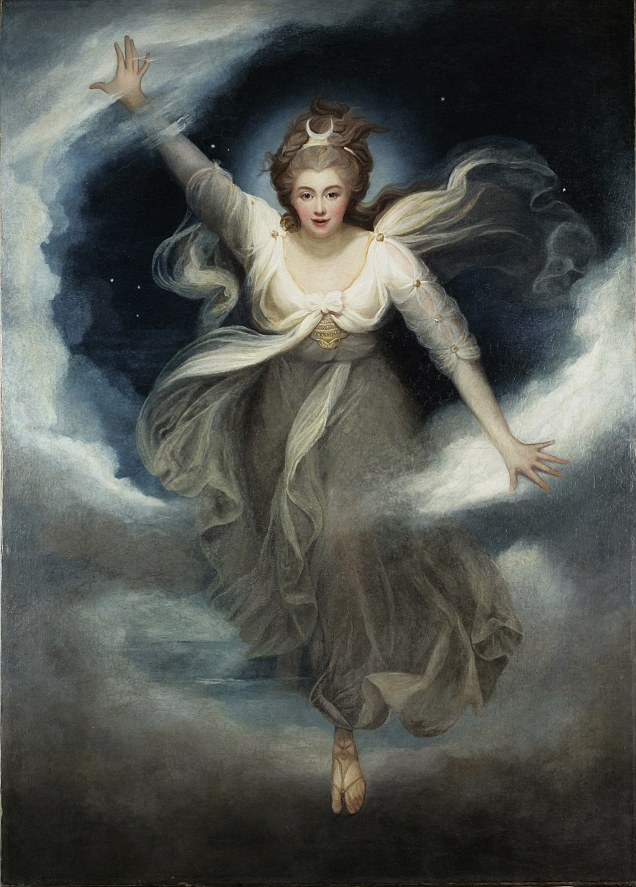
Duchess of Devonshire as Cynthia by Maria Cosway, 1782

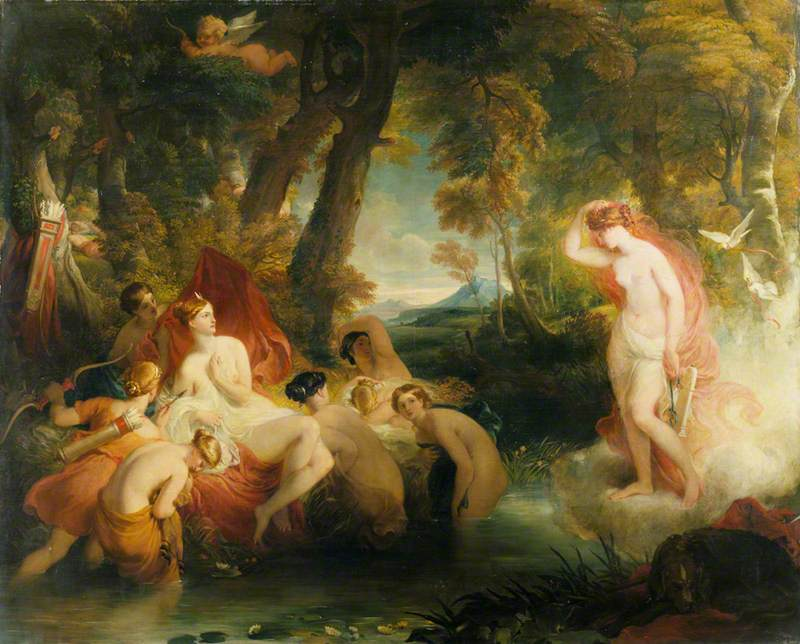
Venus in Search of Cupid Surprises Diana by William Hilton, 1820

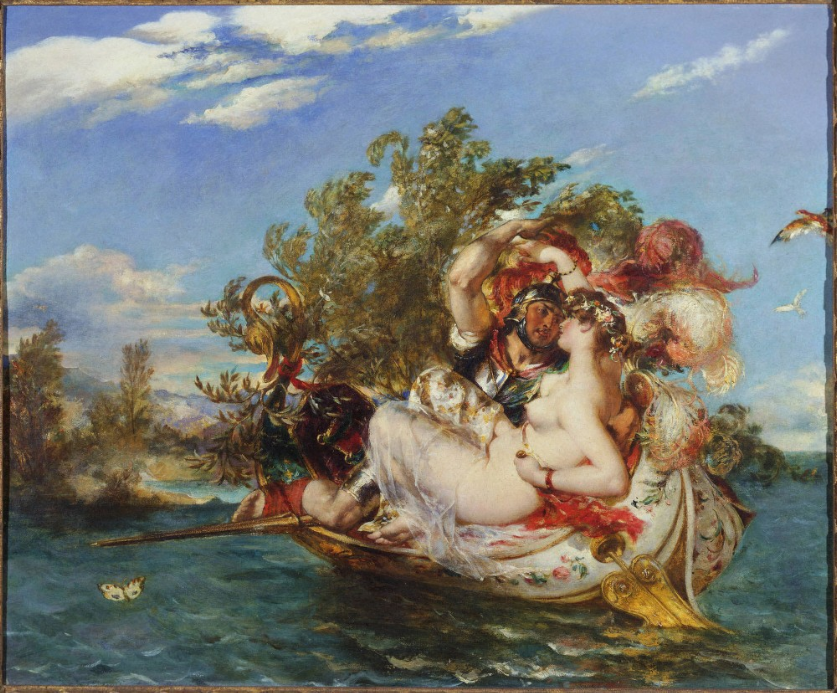
Phaedria and Cymochles by William Etty, 1832

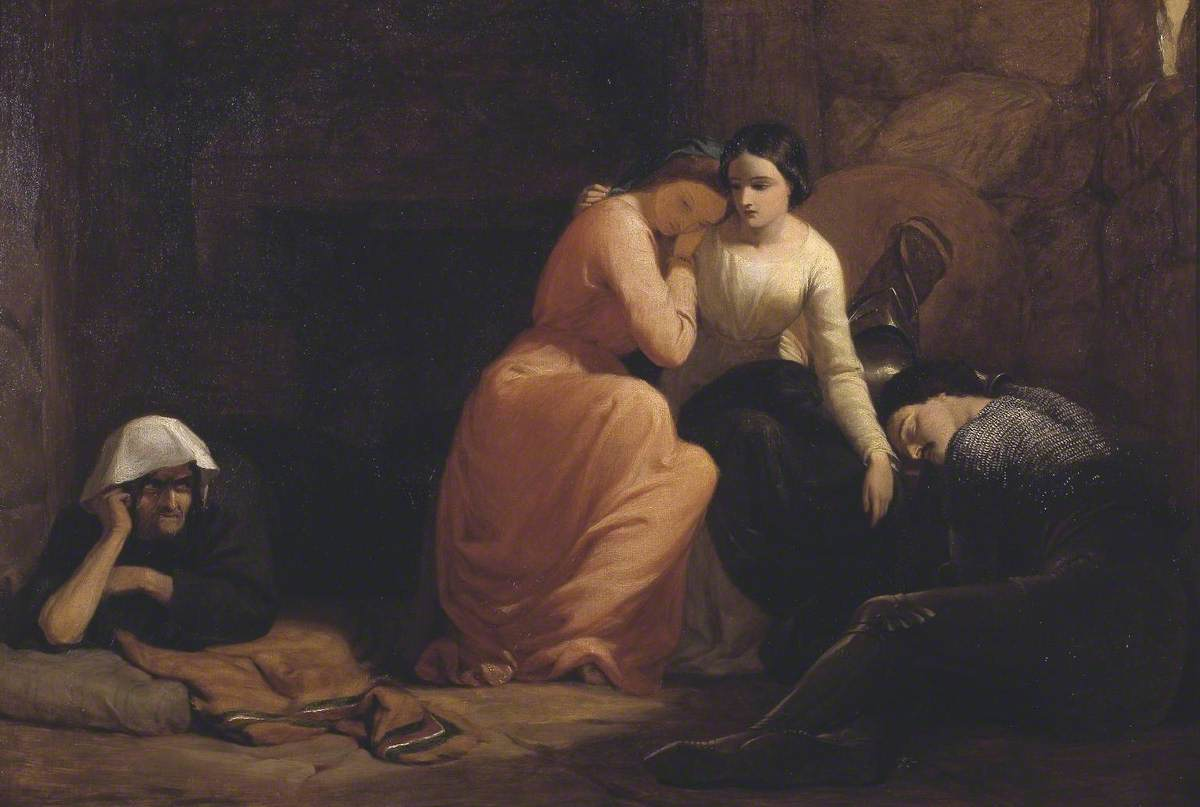
Amoret, Aemylia and Prince Arthur, in the Cottage of Sclaunder by Frederick Richard Pickersgill, 1845

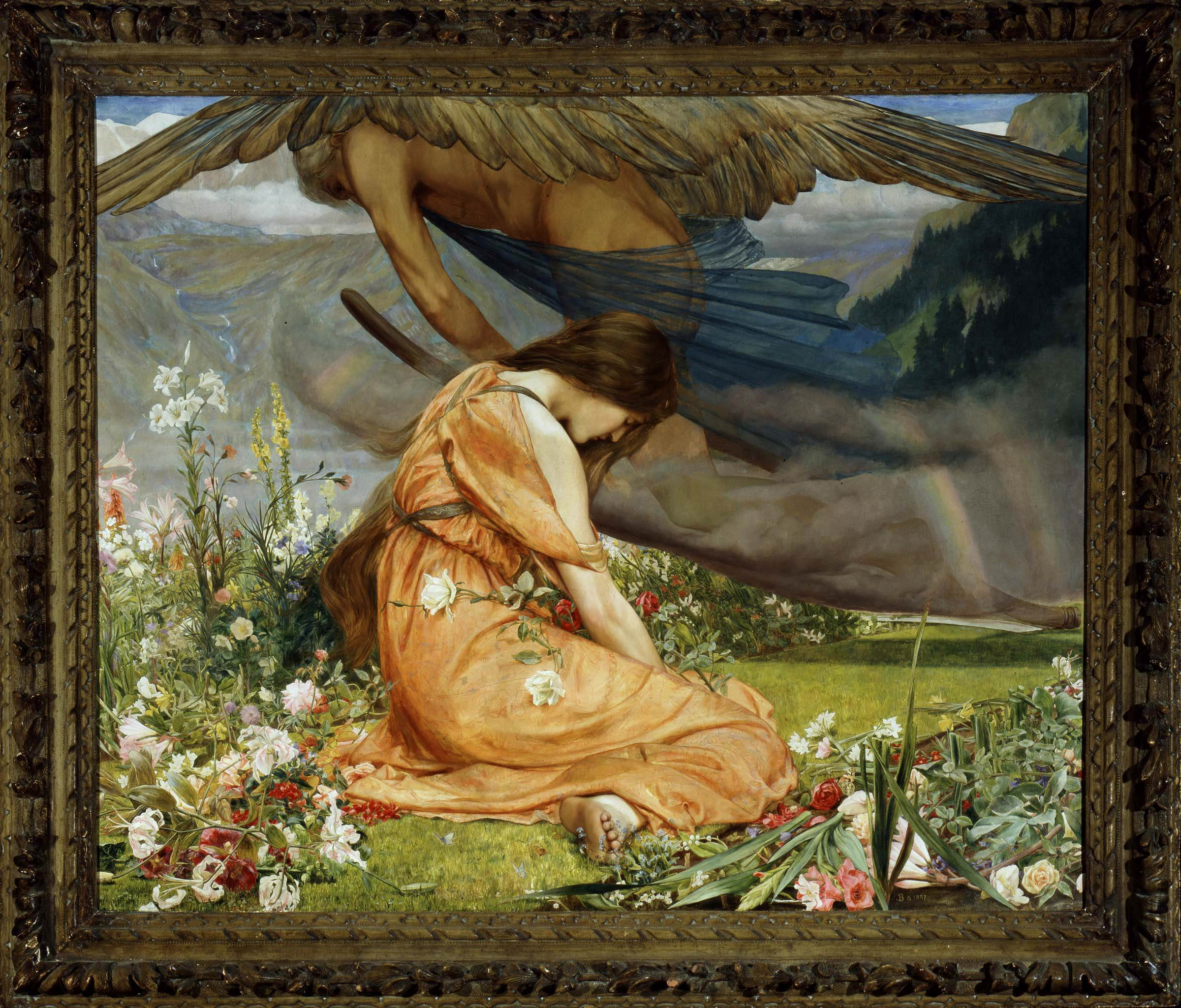
The Garden of Adonis – Amoretta and Time by John Dickson Batten, 1877

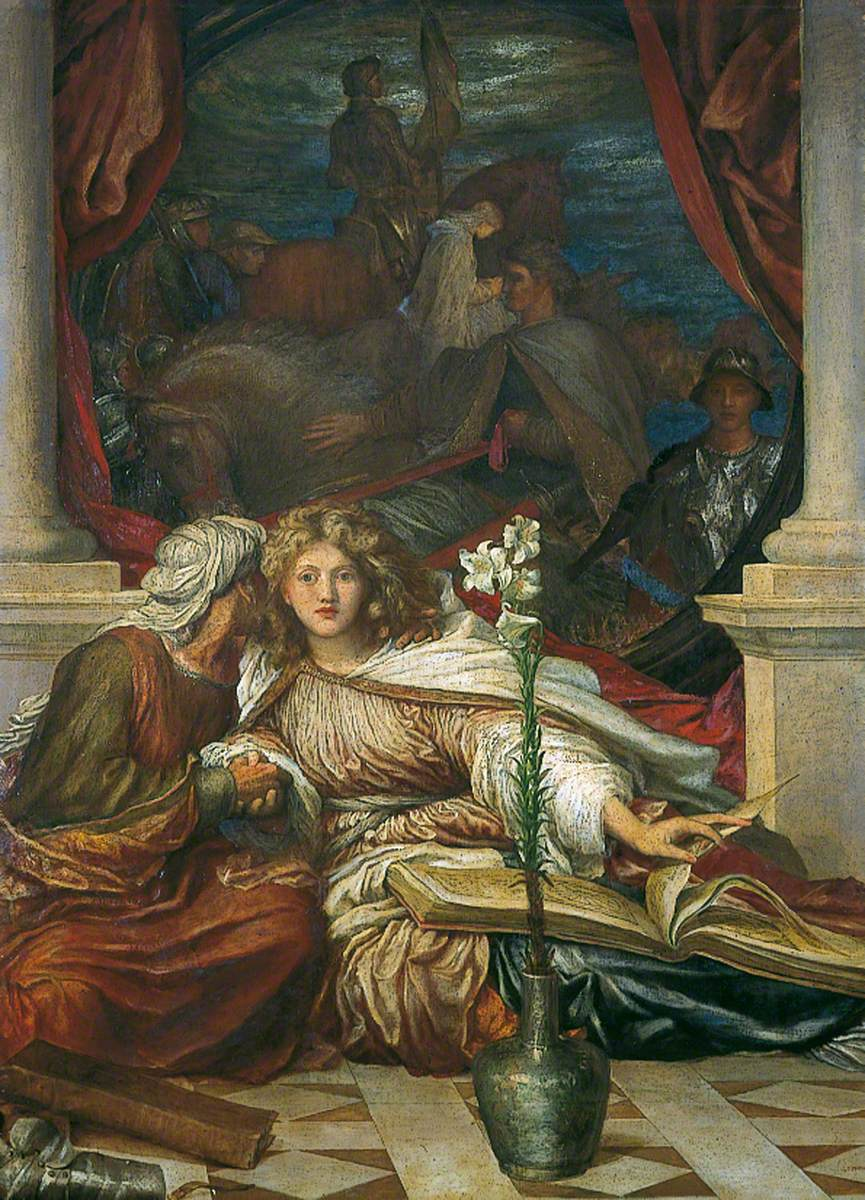
Britomart by George Frederic Watts, between 1877 and 1878

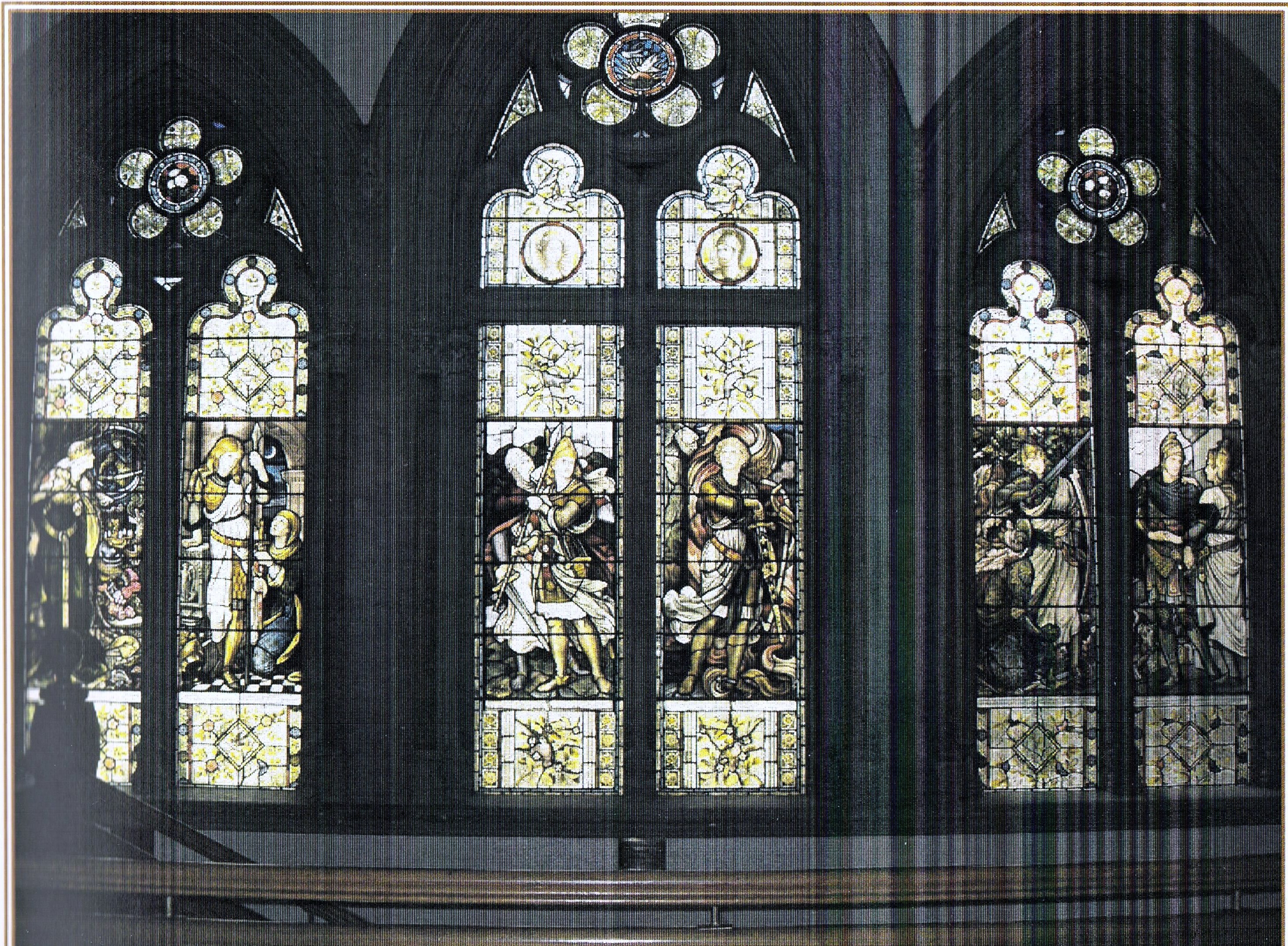
Photograph of six stained glass Britomart windows at Cheltenham Ladies College

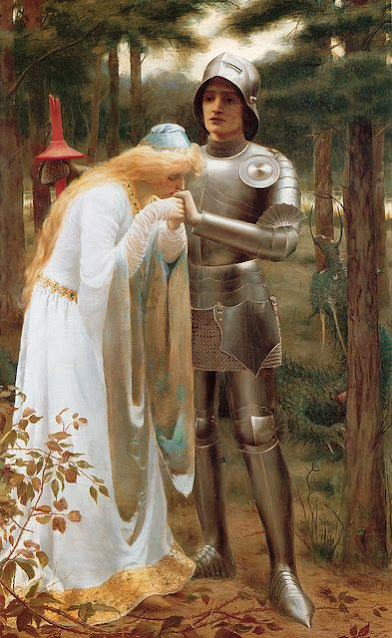
Britomart and Amoret by Mary F. Raphael, 1899

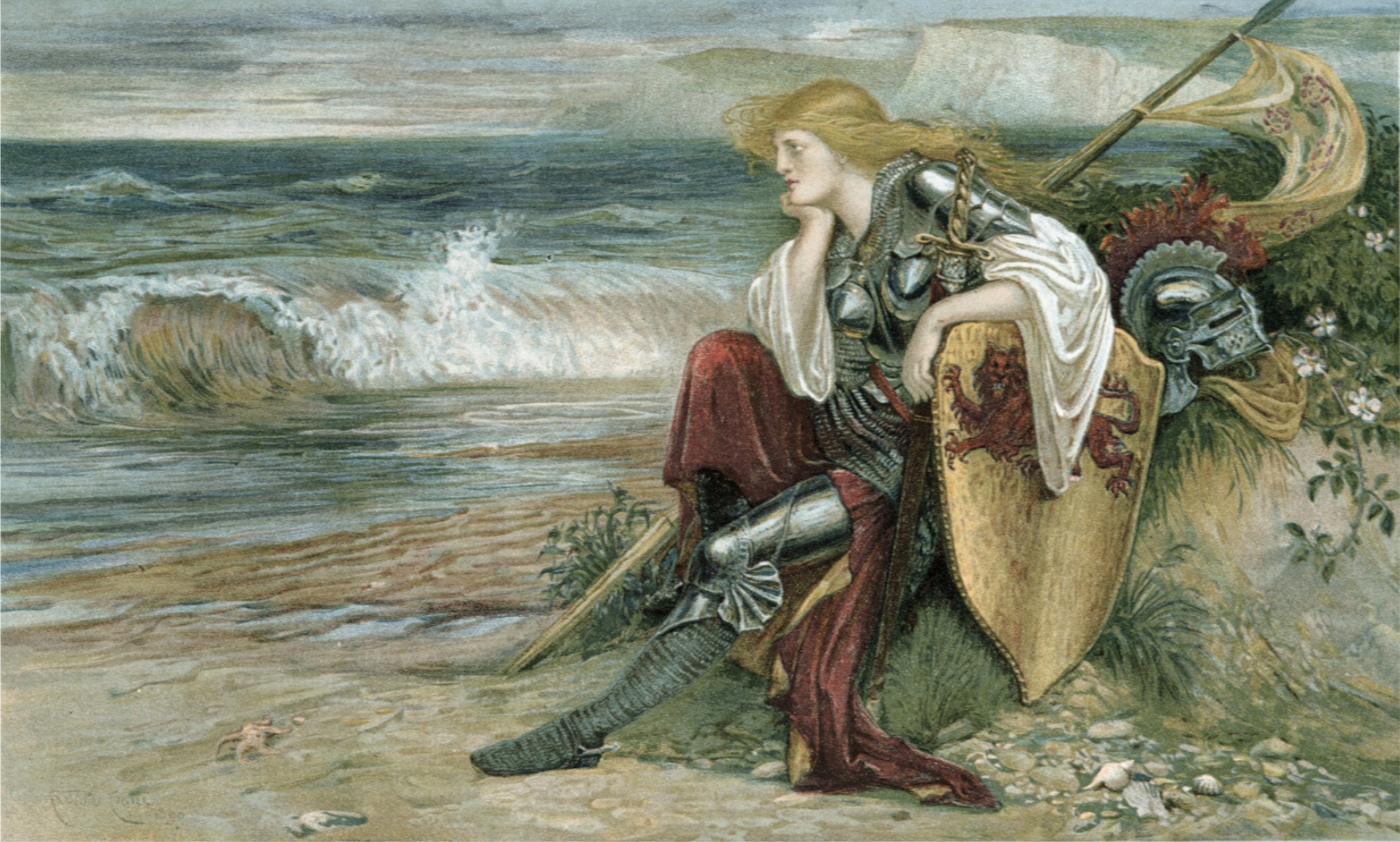
Britomart by Walter Crane, 1900

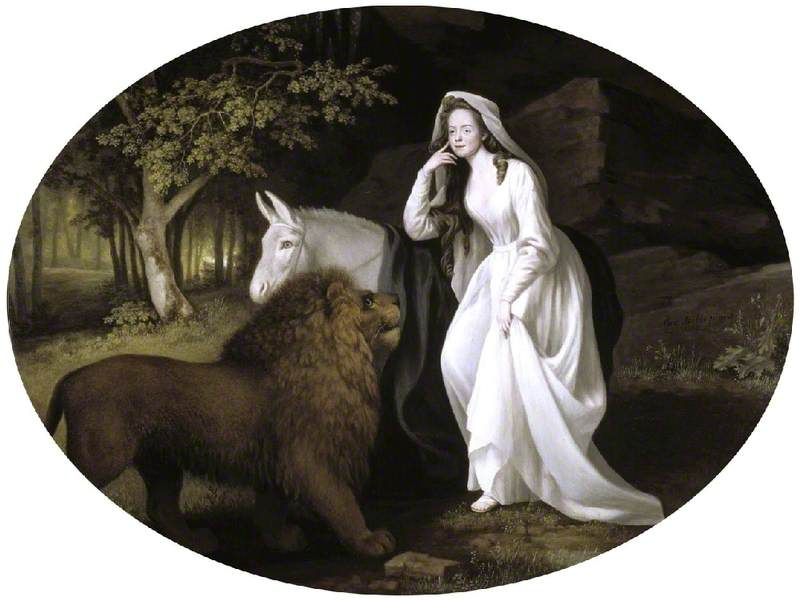
Isabella Salstonstall as Una in Spenser's Faerie Queene by George Stubbs, 1782

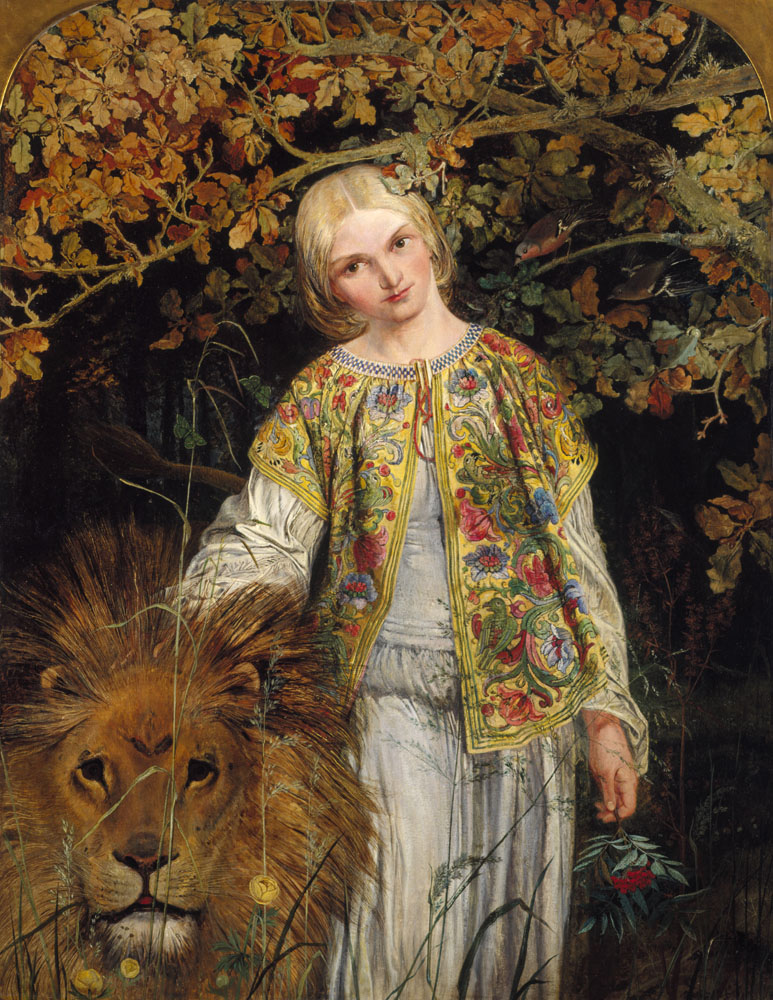
Una and the Lion by William Bell Scott, c. 1860

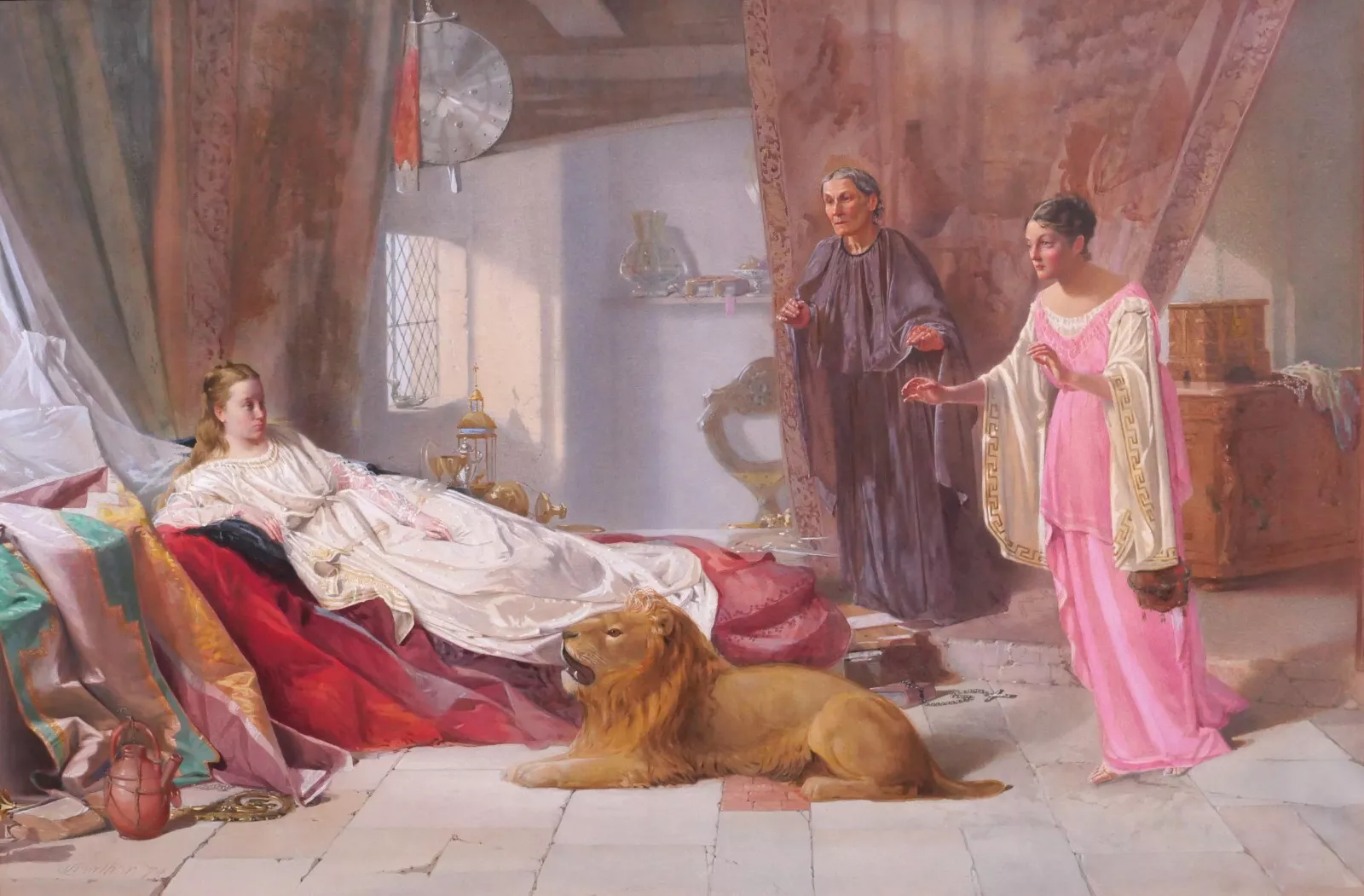
Una and the Lion by John Crowther, 1874

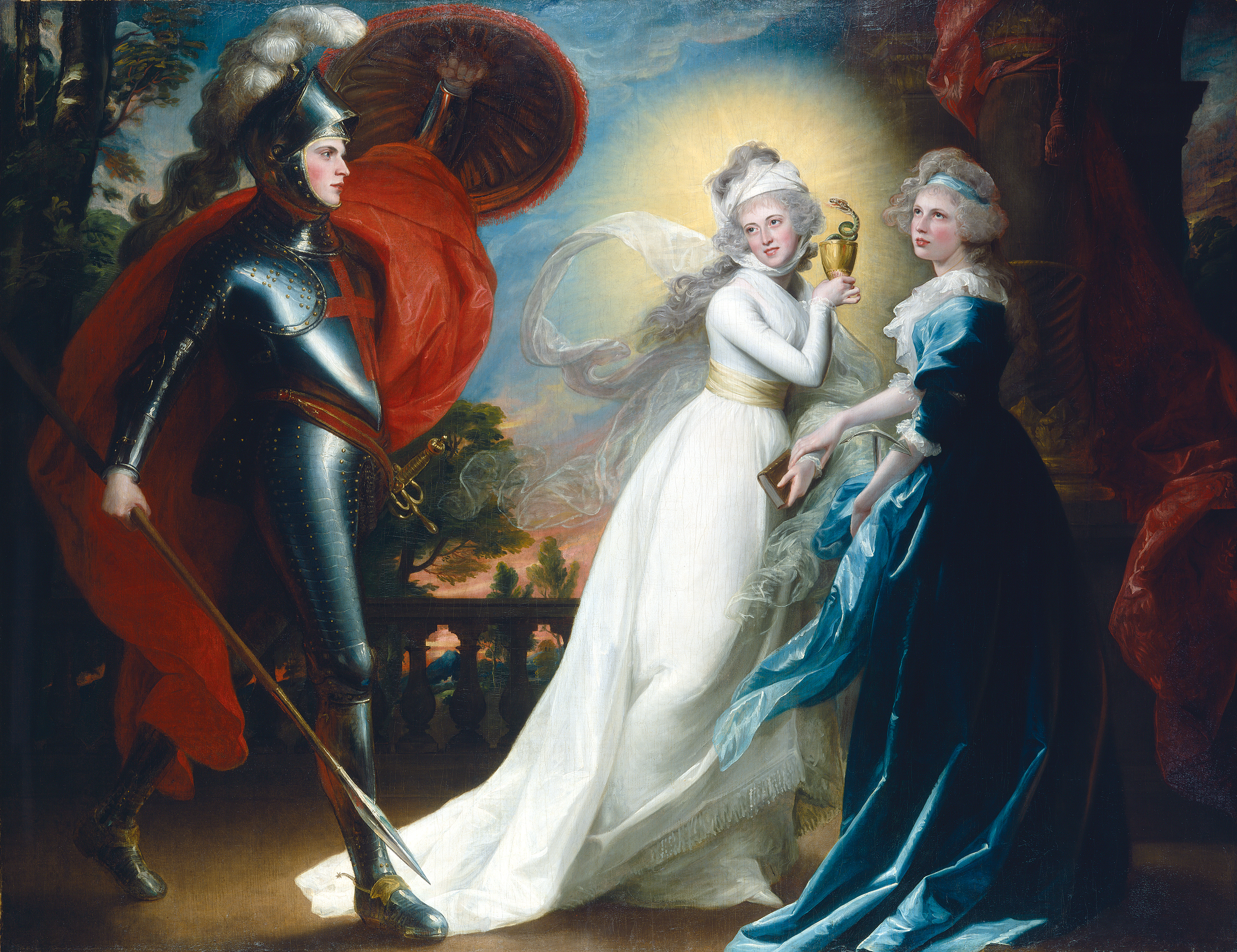
The Red Cross Knight by John Singleton Copley, 1793

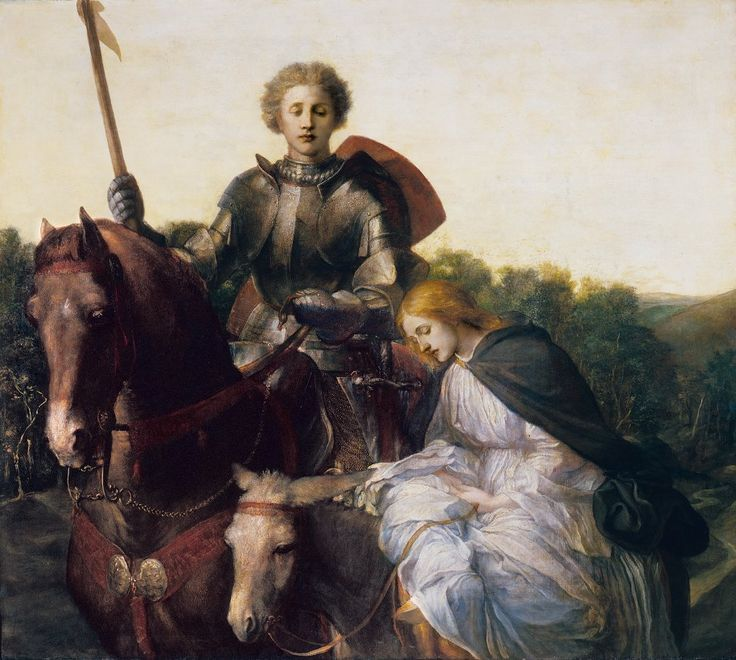
Una and the Red Cross Knight by George Frederic Watts, c. 1860

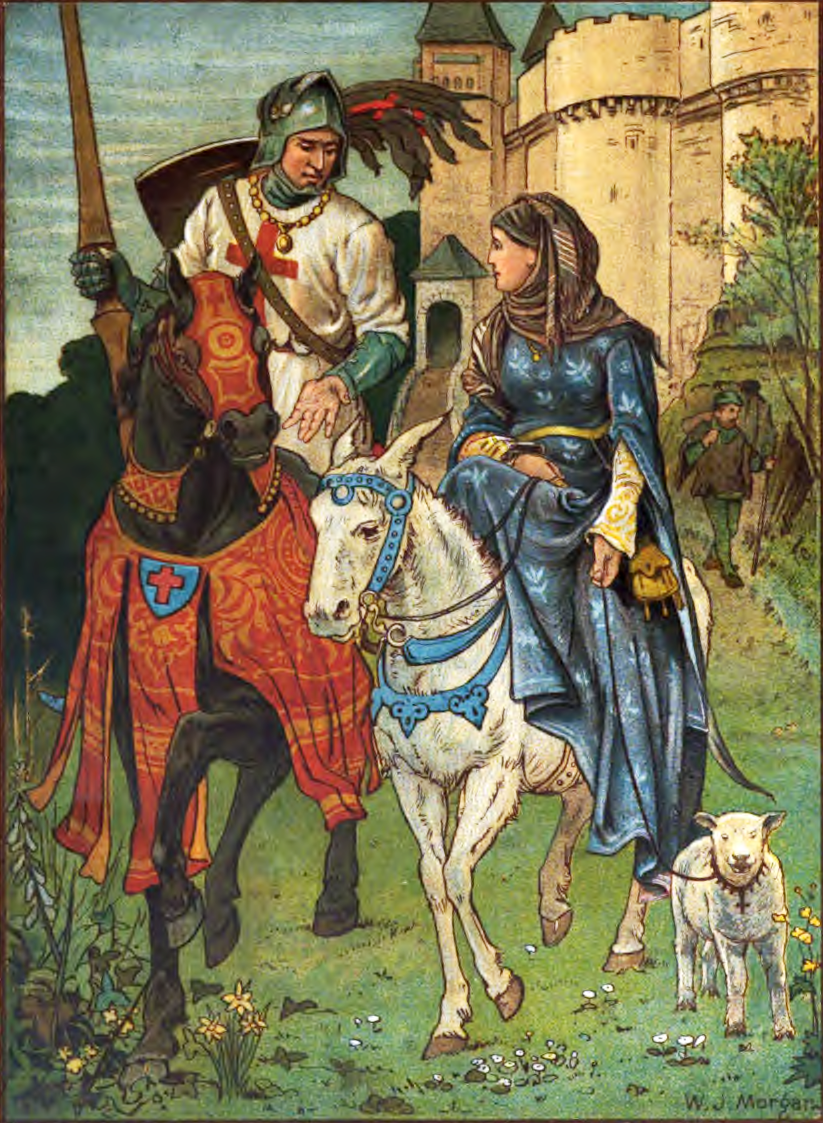
Una and the Red Cross Knight by Walter Jenks Morgan, 1885

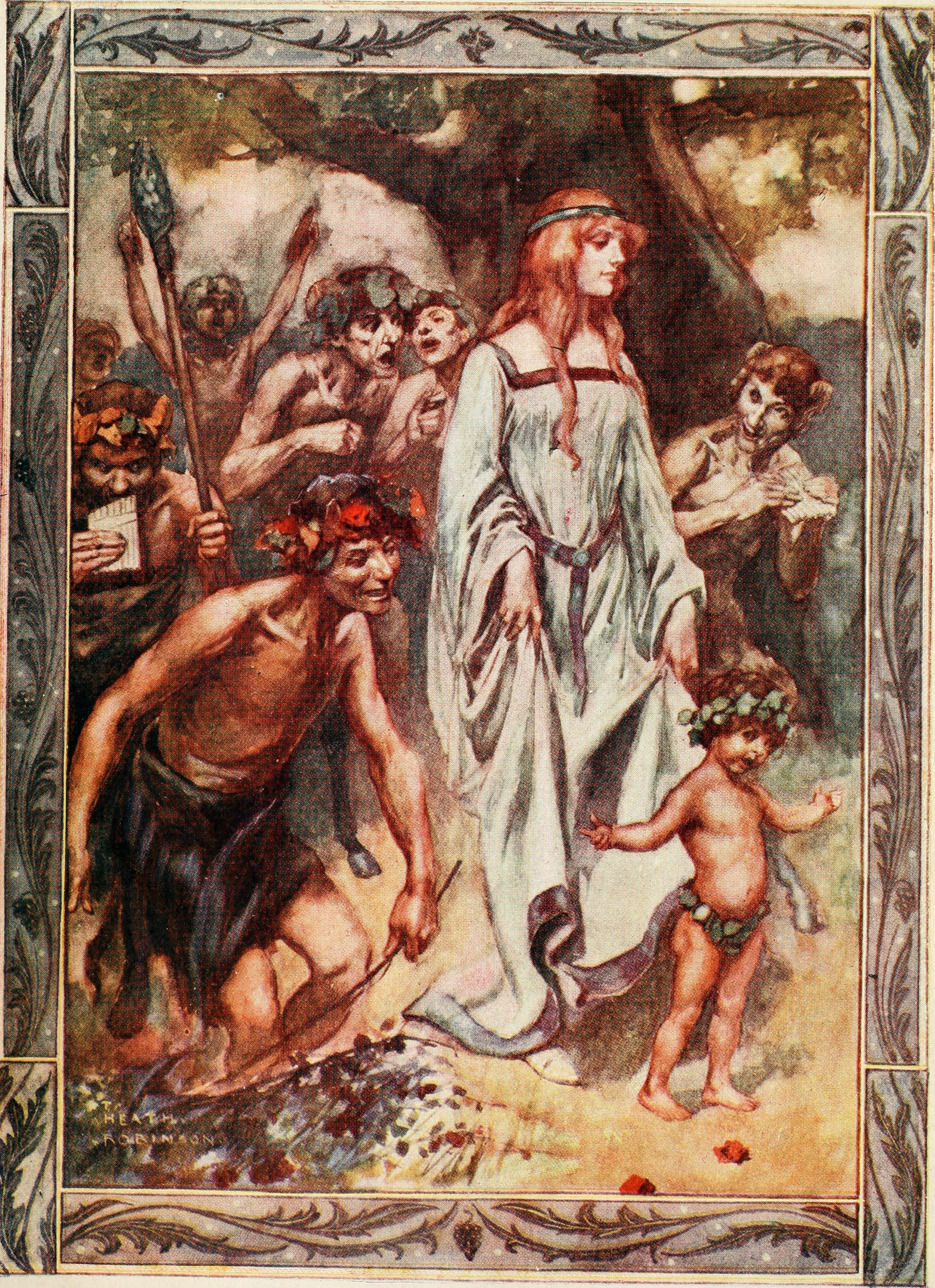
An illustration from Una and the Red Cross Knight, 1905

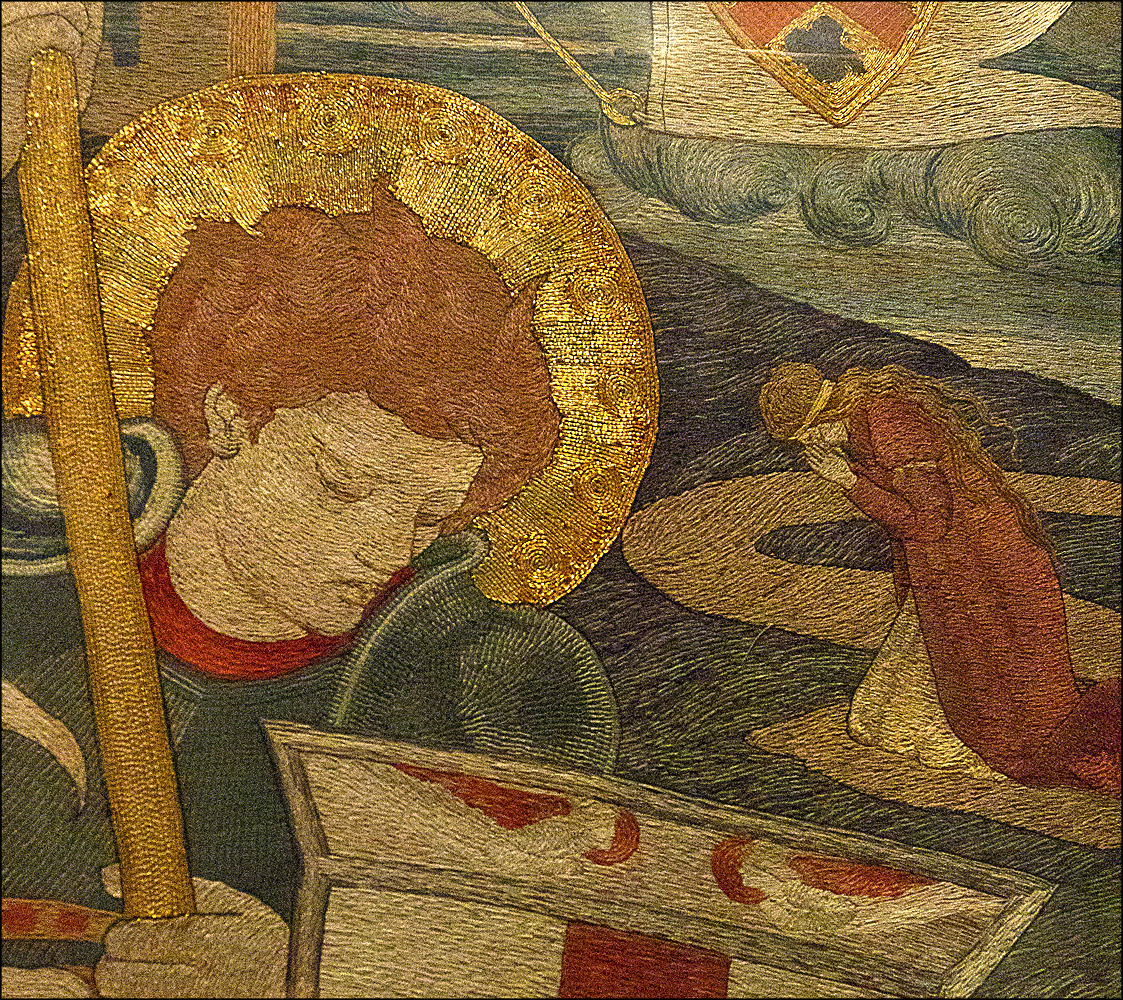
Detail of St. George Slaying the Dragon, with Una Praying in the Background by Phoebe Anna Traquair, 1904

== Bibliography ==
- Abrams, M. H., ed. (2000), Norton Anthology of English Literature (7th ed.), New York: Norton
- Black, Joseph, ed. (2007), The Broadview Anthology of British Literature, vol. A (concise ed.), Broadview Press, ISBN 978-1-55111-868-0
- Cañadas, Ivan (2007), "The Faerie Queene, II.i–ii: Amavia, Medina, and the Myth of Lucretia" (PDF), Medieval and Early Modern English Studies, 15 (2): 383–394, doi:10.17054/memes.2007.15.2.383, archived from the original (PDF) on 4 March 2016
- Craig, Joanne (1972), "The Image of Mortality: Myth and History in the Faerie Queene", ELH, 39 (4): 520–544, doi:10.2307/2872698, JSTOR 2872698
- Cumming, William Paterson (1937), "The Grammar of Spenser's Faerie Queene by Herbert W. Sugden", South Atlantic Bulletin, 3 (1): 6, doi:10.2307/3197672, JSTOR 3197672
- Davis, Walter (2002), "Spenser and the History of Allegory", English Literary Renaissance, 32 (1): 152–167, doi:10.1111/1475-6757.00006, S2CID 143462583
- Draper, John W. (1932), "Classical Coinage in the Faerie Queene", PMLA, 47 (1): 97–108, doi:10.2307/458021, JSTOR 458021, S2CID 163456548
- Glazier, Lyle (1950), "The Struggle between Good and Evil in the First Book of The Faerie Queene", College English, 11 (7): 382–387, doi:10.2307/586023, JSTOR 586023
- Gottfried, Rudolf B. (1968), "Our New Poet: Archetypal Criticism and The Faerie Queene", PMLA, 83 (5): 1362–1377, doi:10.2307/1261309, JSTOR 1261309, S2CID 163320376
- Green, Paul D. (1974), "Spenser and the Masses: Social Commentary in The Faerie Queene", Journal of the History of Ideas, 35 (3): 389–406, doi:10.2307/2708790, JSTOR 2708790
- Greenblatt, Stephen, ed. (2012), "The Faerie Queene, Introduction", The Norton Anthology of English Literature (9th ed.), London: Norton, p. 775
- Greenblatt, Stephen, ed. (2006), "Mary I (Mary Tudor)", The Norton Anthology of English Literature (8th ed.), New York: Norton, pp. 663–687
- Geoffrey of Monmouth, "Book VII Chapter III: The Prophecy of Merlin", Historia Regum Brittaniae, Caerleon Net
- Heale, Elizabeth (1999), The Faerie Queene: A Reader's Guide, Cambridge: Cambridge UP, pp. 8–11
- Healy, Thomas (2009), "Elizabeth I at Tilbury and Popular Culture", Literature and Popular Culture in Early Modern England, London: Ashgate, pp. 166–177
- Levin, Richard A. (1991), "The Legende of the Redcrosse Knight and Una, or of the Love of a Good Woman", SEL: Studies in English Literature 1500–1900, 31 (1): 1–24, doi:10.2307/450441, JSTOR 450441
- Loewenstein, David; Mueller, Janel M (2003), The Cambridge history of early modern English Literature, Cambridge University Press, ISBN 0-521-63156-4
- Marotti, Arthur F. (1965), "Animal Symbolism in the Faerie Queene: Tradition and the Poetic Context", SEL: Studies in English Literature 1500–1900, 5 (1): 69–86, doi:10.2307/449571, JSTOR 449571
- McCabe, Richard A. (2010), The Oxford Handbook of Edmund Spenser, Oxford: Oxford UP, pp. 48–273
- McElderry, Bruce Robert Jr (March 1932), "Archaism and Innovation in Spenser's Poetic Diction", PMLA, 47 (1): 144–170, doi:10.2307/458025, JSTOR 458025, S2CID 163385153
- Micros, Marianne (2008), "Robber Bridegrooms and Devoured Brides", in Lamb, Mary Ellen; Bamford, Karen (eds.), Oral Traditions and Gender in Early Modern Literary Texts, London: Ashgate
- Millican, Charles Bowie (1932), Spenser and the Table Round, New York: Octagon
- Parker, Roscoe (1925), "Spenser's Language and the Pastoral Tradition", Language, 1 (3), Linguistic Society of America: 80–87, doi:10.2307/409365, JSTOR 409365
- Pope, Emma Field (1926), "Renaissance Criticism and the Diction of the Faerie Queene", PMLA, 41 (3): 575–580, doi:10.2307/457619, JSTOR 457619, S2CID 163503939
- Roche, Thomas P. Jr (1984), "Editorial Apparatus", The Faerie Queene, by Spenser, Edmund, Penguin Books, ISBN 0-14-042207-2
- Spenser, Edmund (1984), "A Letter of the Authors Expounding His Whole Intention in the Course of the Worke: Which for That It Giueth Great Light to the Reader, for the Better Vnderstanding Is Hereunto Annexed", in Roche, Thomas P. Jr (ed.), The Fairy Queene, New York: Penguin, pp. 15–18
- Turnage, Maxine (1970). "Samuel Johnson's Criticism of the Works of Edmund Spenser". SEL: Studies in English Literature 1500–1900. 10 (3): 557–567. doi:10.2307/449795. ISSN 0039-3657. JSTOR 449795.
- Tuve, Rosemond (1966), Allegorical Imagery: Some Medieval Books and Their Posterity, Princeton: Princeton UP
- Wadoski, Andrew (2022), Spenser's Ethics: Empire, Mutability, and Moral Philosophy in Early Modernity, Manchester University Press, ISBN 978-1-5261-6543-5
- Whitaker, Virgil K. (1952), "The Theological Structure of the Faerie Queene, Book I", ELH, 19 (3): 151–155, doi:10.2307/2871935, JSTOR 2871935
- Yamashita, Hiroshi; Suzuki, Toshiyuki (1993), A Textual Companion to The Faerie Qveene 1590, Kenyusha, Tokyo, ISBN 4-905888-05-0
- Yamashita, Hiroshi; Suzuki, Toshiyuki (1990), A Comprehensive Concordance to The Faerie Qveene 1590, Kenyusha, Tokyo, ISBN 4-905888-03-4
