= Orgoglio =

Literary character

Orgoglio is a literary character in Edmund Spenser's famous epic The Faerie Queene. He appears in the seventh canto of Book One as a beast and attacks the main character, Redcrosse, who symbolizes the ultimate Christian knight, during a moment of weakness. "Orgoglio" means "pride" in Italian. In chapter IX of Waverley, by Sir Walter Scott, the manor of Bradwardyne is compared to the castle of Orgoglio.
