= Ignazio Dolce =

Italian director and actor (1933–2010)

- Born: 26 March 1933; Palermo, Italy
- Died: 6 January 2010 (aged 76); Rome, Italy
- Other name: Paul D. Robinson
- Occupations: Director, actor

Ignazio Dolce (26 March 1933 – 6 January 2010) was an Italian director and actor.

== Life and career ==
Born in Palermo, Sicily, Dolce graduated at Centro Sperimentale di Cinematografia, and starting from the late 1950s he began a career as a character actor. Almost simultaneously he started a parallel career as a second unit director, often collaborating with Gianfranco Parolini and Antonio Margheriti. He debuted as a director in 1975 with the black comedy L'ammazzatina, and in the late 1980s he specialised in low-budget war films, being usually credited as Paul D. Robinson. Dolce died in Rome on 6 January 2010, at the age of 76.

== Partial filmography ==
- Tough Guys (1960)
- The Best of Enemies (1961)
- Last Platoon (1988)
