= List of horror films of 1986 =

This is a list of horror films released in 1986.

Title	Director(s)	Cast	Country	Notes	Ref.
The Abomination	Bret McCormick	Gaye Bottoms, Victoria Chaney, Van Connery	United States		
April Fool's Day	Fred Walton	Deborah Foreman, Amy Steel, Ken Olandt	United States		
Chopping Mall	Jim Wynorski	Kelli Maroney, Tony O'Dell, Russell Todd	United States		
Class of Nuke 'Em High	Richard W. Haines, Michael Herz, Lloyd Kaufman	Gil Brenton, Elizabeth Lambert, Anthony Ventola	United States		
Critters	Stephen Herek	Dee Wallace, M. Emmet Walsh, Billy Green Bush	United States	First film of Critters franchise	
Dark Age	Arch Nicholson	Janet Kingsbury, John Jarratt, Nikki Coghill	Australia		
Dead End Drive-In	Brian Trenchard-Smith	Ned Manning, Natalie McCurry	United States	Alternative title(s): Dead End	
Deadly Friend	Wes Craven	Matthew Laborteaux, Kristy Swanson, Michael Sharrett	United States		
Deadtime Stories	Jeffrey S. Delman	Scott Valentine, Nicole Picard, Cathryn de Prume	United States		
Demons 2	Lamberto Bava	Nancy Brilli, Coralina Cataldi-Tassoni, Bobby Rhodes	Italy	Sequel to Demons (1985)	
Dream Lover	Alan J. Pakula	Kristy McNichol, Ben Masters, Paul Shenar	United States		
Dreamaniac	David DeCoteau	Ashlyn Gere, Thomas Bern, Sylvia Summers	United States		
Entrails of a Beautiful Woman	Kazuo Komizu		Japan		
Entrails of a Virgin	Kazuo Komizu	Kazuhiko Goda, Naomi Hagio, Taiju Kato	Japan		
Escapes	Clarence I. Steensen	Vincent Price	United Kingdom		
Evil Laugh	Dominick Bracsia	Myles O'Brien, Dominick Brascia, Jerold Pearson	United States		
The Fly	David Cronenberg	Jeff Goldblum, Geena Davis, John Getz	United States		
Friday the 13th Part VI: Jason Lives	Tom McLoughlin	Jennifer C. Cooke, David Kagen, Rene Jones	United States	Sixth film of Friday the 13th franchise	
From Beyond	Stuart Gordon	Jeffrey Combs	United States		
Gothic	Ken Russell	Gabriel Byrne, Julian Sands, Natasha Richardson	United Kingdom		
Guzoo The Thing Forsaken By God Part I	Kazuo Komizu	Yumiko Ishikawa, Naomi Kajitani, Kyoko Komiyama, Tomoko Maruyama, Hidemi Maruyama	Japan		
Henry: Portrait of a Serial Killer	John McNaughton	Michael Rooker, Tom Towles	United States		
Haunted Honeymoon	Gene Wilder	Gene Wilder, Gilda Radner, Dom DeLuise, Jonathan Pryce, Paul L. Smith	United States		
The Hitcher	Robert Harmon	Rutger Hauer, C. Thomas Howell, Jennifer Jason Leigh	United States		
House	Steve Miner	William Katt, George Wendt, Richard Moll	United States		
Invaders from Mars	Tobe Hooper	Timothy Bottoms, Karen Black, James Karen	United States		
The Killer is Still Among Us	Camillo Teti	Mariangela D'Abbraccio, Giovanni Visentin, Riccardo Parisio Perrotti	Italy		
Killer Party	William Fruet	Martin Hewitt, Ralph Seymour, Elaine Wilkes	Canada; United States		
Killer Workout	David A. Prior	David James Campbell, Marcia Karr, Ted Prior	United States	Alternative title(s): Aerobi-cide	
Link	Richard Franklin	Elisabeth Shue, Terence Stamp	United Kingdom; United States		
Little Shop of Horrors	Frank Oz	John Candy, Steve Martin, Rick Moranis	United States		
Maximum Overdrive	Stephen King	Emilio Estevez, Yeardley Smith, Christopher Britton	United States		
Midnight Killer	Lamberto Bava	Valeria D'Obici, Leonardo Treviglio, Paolo Malco	Italy	Alternative title(s): You'll Die at Midnight	
Monster Dog	Claudio Fragasso	Alice Cooper, Victoria Vera, Carlos Santurio	Spain		
Murderlust	Donald Jones	Eli Rich, Rocky Taylor, Dennis Gannon	United States		
Neon Maniacs	Joseph Mangine	Alan Hayes, Leilani Sarelle, Donna Locke	United States		
Night of the Creeps	Fred Dekker	Jason Lively, Steve Marshall, Jill Whitlow	United States		
Night Ripper!	Jeff Hathcock	James Hansen, Larry Thomas	United States		
Nomads	John McTiernan	Pierce Brosnan, Lesley-Anne Down	United States		
Poltergeist II: The Other Side	Brian Gibson	JoBeth Williams, Craig T. Nelson, Heather O'Rourke	United States		
Psycho III	Anthony Perkins	Anthony Perkins, Diana Scarwid, Jeff Fahey, Roberta Maxwell, Hugh Gillin, Robert Alan Browne, Gary Bayer, Lee Garlington, Donovan Scott, Karen Hensel, Jack Murdock, Katt Shea, Juliette Cummins	United States	Third film of Psycho franchise	
Rawhead Rex	George Pavlou	David Dukes, Kelly Piper, Niall Tóibín, Cora Venus Lunny	Ireland		
Screamtime	Michael Armstrong, Stanley A. Long	Vincent Russo, Michael Gordon, Marie Scinto	United Kingdom		
Slaughter High	George Dugdale, Mark Ezra	Caroline Munro, Simon Scuddamore	United Kingdom; United States		
Sorority House Massacre	Carol Frank	Angela O'Neill, Wendy Martel, Pamela Ross	United States		
Spookies	Eugenie Joseph, Thomas Doran, Brendan Faulkner	Felix Ward, Alec Nemser, Maria Pechukas	United States		
Terror at Tenkiller	Ken Meyer	Dale Buckmaster, Stacy Logan, Michelle Merchant	United States		
TerrorVision	Ted Nicolaou	Diane Franklin, Gerritt Graham, Mary Woronov	United States		
The Texas Chainsaw Massacre 2	Tobe Hooper	Dennis Hopper, Caroline Williams, Jim Siedow, Bill Johnson, Bill Moseley, Lou Perryman, Chris Douridas, Ken Evert, Kirk Sisco, Kinky Friedman, Dan Jenkins, Joe Bob Briggs	United States	Second film of The Texas Chainsaw Massacre franchise	
The Tomb	Fred Olen Ray	John Carradine, Sybil Danning, Richard Hench	United States		
Trick or Treat	Charles Martin Smith	Ozzy Osbourne, Claudia Templeton, Gene Simmons	United States		
Troll	John Carl Buechler	Noah Hathaway, Michael Moriarty, Shelley Hack	United States		
Truth or Dare?: A Critical Madness	Tim Ritter	Christopher Bontempo, Mary Fanaro, Mona Jones	United States		
Vamp	Richard Wenk	Chris Makepeace, Grace Jones, Sandy Baron	United States		
The Vindicator	Jean-Claude Lord	David McIlwraith, Teri Austin, Richard Cox	United States	Alternative title(s): Frankenstein '88	
The Wind	Nico Mastorakis	Meg Foster, Wings Hauser, David McCallum	United States	Alternative title(s): Edge of Terror	
Witchboard	Kevin Tenney	Tawny Kitaen, Todd Allen, Clare Bristol	United States		
The Wraith	Mike Marvin	Charlie Sheen, Nick Cassavetes, Sherilyn Fenn	United States		
Zombie Nightmare	Jack Bravman	Tia Carrere, Jon Mikl Thor, Adam West	Canada		

== Sources ==
- Albright, Brian (2012). Regional Horror Films, 1958-1990: A State-by-State Guide with Interviews. Jefferson, North Carolina: McFarland. ISBN 978-1-476-60042-0.
- Curti, Roberto (2019). Italian Gothic Horror Films, 1980-1989. Jefferson, North Carolina: McFarland. ISBN 978-1476672434.
- Dyer, Richard (2016). Lethal Repetition: Serial Killing in European Cinema. London, England: British Film Institute. ISBN 978-1-844-57394-3.
- Hardy, Phil, ed. (1995). The Overlook Film Encyclopedia. Vol. 3. Overlook Press. ISBN 0-87951-624-0.
- Muir, John Kenneth (2010). Horror Films of the 1980s. Jefferson, North Carolina: McFarland. ISBN 978-0-786-45501-0.
- Paul, Louis (2015). Italian Horror Film Directors. Jefferson, North Carolina: McFarland. ISBN 978-0-786-48749-3.
- Stine, Scott Aaron (2003). The Gorehound's Guide to Splatter Films of the 1980s. Jefferson, North Carolina: McFarland. ISBN 978-1-476-61132-7.
- Young, R. G. (2000). The Encyclopedia of Fantastic Film: Ali Baba to Zombies. Hal Leonard Corporation. ISBN 1-55783-269-2.
