= The Other Hell =

- Directed by: Bruno Mattei; Claudio Fragasso
- Screenplay by: Claudio Fragasso
- Story by: Bruno Mattei; Claudio Fragasso
- Produced by: Arcangelo Picchi
- Starring: Franca Stoppi; Carlo De Mejo; Francesca Carmeno; Susan Fargetta
- Cinematography: Giuseppe Beradini
- Edited by: Lilliana Serra
- Music by: Goblin
- Production company: Cinemec Produzione S.r.l
- Distributed by: Accord Cinematografica
- Release date: 22 January 1981 (Italy)
- Running time: 88 minutes
- Country: Italy

The Other Hell (Italian: L'altro inferno) is a 1981 Italian horror film written and directed by Bruno Mattei and Claudio Fragasso and starring Franca Stoppi and Carlo De Mejo.

== Plot ==
Sister Cristina is lost in the catacombs under the convent while searching for Sister Assunta. She finds her in what appears to be a laboratory in the convent's morgue. While Sister Assunta is preparing a nun's corpse for embalming, she relays the dangers the nuns face in temptation by Satan with lustful desires; she also tells a story of a child born dead in the convent to a nun who fornicated with the devil, and events surrounding the murder of the previous mother superior, Sister Florence. She claims Sister Florence's ghost still haunts the convent, calling the name of the nun who murdered her. Then, as if under a supernatural influence, she horribly murders Sister Cristina before dying herself. Mother Vincenza discovers the corpses of both nuns and justifies the deaths as accidental to the investigating Father Inardo. However, Sister Rosaria shouts that the devil lodges in the convent and is rebuked by Mother Vincenza. Sister Rosaria bleeds from her mouth when Father Inardo administers communion; afterwards, locked in her room, she experiences the symptoms of stigmata. Father Inardo is purifying the convent with the Mother Superior and the rest of the nuns in tow, until they are alerted by the cries of pain of Sister Rosaria. They rush to her room to find the nun has been horribly murdered, the bed and walls covered in blood.

Father Inardo and the Bishop, in order to unravel the situation, charge young Father Valerio with the investigation. He soon arrives at the convent where he discovers, in recent times, other supernatural events seem to have occurred in addition to the death of the previous nuns. Father Valerio understands that the whole environment is dominated by the dictatorial figure of Mother Vincenza and frequently clashes with her during the investigation, coming to suspect she is hiding something. After various vicissitudes, including the deaths of Father Inardo and the gardener Boris, Father Valerio discovers that the basis of the bloody facts is Elisa, the illegitimate daughter of Mother Vincenza. She has been kept segregated from her mother in a hidden room of the convent, her face horribly disfigured. A flashback reveals that soon as she was born, in fact, she had been thrown into boiling water by the previous mother abbess, Sister Florence, in order to dispose of a child born of a clandestine relationship between Sister Vincenza and a stranger. At the time of the immersion, the little girl, however, had managed to drive Mother Florence away with the power of her mind and caused her to strangle herself. Elisa, now a teenager, is endowed with supernatural powers, and is exploited by Mother Vincenza, in order to eliminate people who became aware of her motherhood or disobey her strict orders. Elisa had caused, by the strength of her thought, all the deaths in the convent.

Having discovered the horrible truth, Father Valerio is attacked and brutally stabbed by an enraged Mother Vincenza. Mother Vincenza reveals that she made a pact with the devil and renounced Christianity, and that Elisa is the daughter of Satan, thus confirming Sister Assunta's story from the beginning. Elisa attempts to save Valerio but Mother Vincenza strikes her from behind trying to kill her. A furious struggle ensues between mother and daughter, with Elisa chasing Mother Vincenza through the convent and the catacombs into the morgue. Now cornered, Mother Vincenza begs forgiveness of her daughter but she fatally wounds her with a dagger when Elisa stops the attack. Before dying however, Elisa manages to kill her mother, reviving a corpse to strangle the former nun. Later, after the deaths of Elisa and Mother Vincenza, Father Valerio is hospitalized, having lost his senses. The ecclesiastical authorities inspecting the convent find the laboratory in the morgue where Mother Vincenza practiced black magic. While the bishop and the new abbess are investigating, some hellish forces still seem to haunt the laboratory. They attribute the facts to some sudden earthquake, but as soon as calm returns, the corpse of a nun falls from a coffin with a terrible cry, landing in the arms of the bishop.

== Cast ==
- Franca Stoppi as Mother Vincenza
- Carlo De Mejo as Father Valerio
- Francesca Carmeno as Elisa
- Andrew Ray as Father Inardo
- Susan Forget as Sister Rosaria
- Franco Garofalo as Boris
- Paola Montenero as Sister Assunta
- Sandy Samuel as Catatonic Nun
- Tom Felleghy as The Bishop
- Alba Maiolini as Sister Fiorenza (Sister Florence)

== Production ==
Both The Other Hell and The True Story of the Nun of Monza were the first films that Claudio Fragasso and Bruno Mattei shared film credits on. Fragasso wrote the screenplays for The Other Hell, finding it specifically more interesting than Mattei's The True Story of the Nun of Monza as it reminded him of Carrie set in a convent. Mattei spoke about being influenced by what he described as "Argento's concepts" on the film but that the film was not "an absolute copy of Inferno". According to Rome's Public Cinematographic Register, filming began on October 23, 1979, and continued through October and November when very little about Argento's film was known except its title and some stills from the set.

The Other Hell was made simultaneously with The True Story of the Nun of Monza with the same actors and building for both films. Fragasso shot The Other Hell downstairs in the building and Mattei shot the Monza film upstairs, helping each other if "a particular area of expertise" was needed. Fragasso explained that they both shot the films simultaneously with the actors switching actors, which led to them pleasing their producers as they were able to complete the films in five weeks for the cost of one. Fragsso recalled having to steal canisters of film from Mattei and other material from him, noting that "I was given very little, he had everything." This form of shooting films would continue between the two directors on their prison films Violence in a Women's Prison and Women's Prison Massacre and their westerns White Apache and Scalps. Mattei maintained that Fragasso was always an assistant director on these films, and nothing more.

Music in the film is taken from the band Goblin, specifically from their albums Roller and Il fantastico viaggio del bagarozzo Mark. Fragasso recalled that they used Goblin as they were fashionable and asked them to write music for the film, but they asked for a lot of money, leading to the production to use stock music with a few modifications specifically for The Other Hell. Mattei stated that he was friends with Carlo Bixio who was the music publisher, and he gave the production the music they wanted.

== Release ==
The film passed Italian censors on July 23, 1980. The Other Hell was distributed in Italy on 22 January 1981.

The film has been released on home video by Vestron Home Video as The Other Hell with an 88-minute running time.
