= Monster Dog =

- Video box cover
- Directed by: Claudio Fragasso
- Screenplay by: Claudio Fragasso; Rossella Drudi
- Story by: Claudio Fragasso; Rossella Drudi
- Produced by: Eduard Salui
- Starring: Alice Cooper; Victoria Vera; Carlos Santurio
- Cinematography: José García Galisteo
- Edited by: Antonio José Ochoa
- Music by: Grupo Dichotomy
- Production companies: Continental Motion Pictures; M&C Films; Royal Films
- Distributed by: Union Films S.A.
- Release dates: 18 July 1986 (United States); 16 August 1988 (Spain)
- Running time: 84 minutes
- Country: Spain
- Language: English

Monster Dog (Spanish: Leviatán) is a 1986 Spanish horror film directed by Claudio Fragasso and starring Alice Cooper and Victoria Vera. Cooper plays a rock star who returns to his hometown, which has been plagued by wild dog attacks.

== Plot summary ==
Vince Raven (Cooper) is performing in the music video for his new song, "Identity Crisis." Later, Vince, Vince's girlfriend Sandra, and Vince's film crew drive to Vince's old childhood home to shoot a music video.

While waiting for the crew, Jos, the caretaker of the house, prepares a welcome home party for Vince. He is interrupted when he begins hearing strange noises. After searching around the house, he walks outside to find a pack of wild canines growling outside his door. The canines outnumber him and attack him.

That evening the crew continue their drive to the house. Along the way, they run into two police officers, Sheriff Morrison and Deputy Dan, who are standing at a barricade. The police warn the crew that there has been another "attack". After the crew leave, the sheriff and his deputy are both killed by the Monster Dog in the woods.

The drive comes to a halt when Vince hits a German Shepherd with the van. The crew cannot stand to watch it suffer in pain, so Vince puts it to rest by killing it with a large rock. While the crew mourns the dog's death, an old man in blood-stained clothing attacks them. He warns them that they "will all die", except for Vince. The old man then runs into the woods. Vince and Sandra chase after him to get him to a hospital, but the Monster Dog scares them back into the van.

When the crew finally arrives at the house, Jos is nowhere to be found. Vince is worried about what happened to Jos, so he takes a shotgun and searches around the house. While the crew waits for Vince to return, they discover the food for the party. After searching the house, Vince gives up and wanders into a room where he discovers a book about werewolves.

Later that night Angela has a nightmare that the bloody old man murders everyone in the house. She runs from him and tries to get to Vince. She finds him reading a book in a rocking chair, his back toward her. She slowly walks up to him from behind until he gets up, revealing that he is the Monster Dog. Angela wakes up screaming and the crew tries to calm her down. She tells them about her dream and how Vince was a "werewolf".

Vince is later found reading in the same rocking chair as in Angela's nightmare. Sandra comes to talk to him, and he tells her the story of his father's death. He says that his father had lycanthropy (the werewolf curse) and that he was blamed for many deaths. He was stabbed with pitchforks, doused with gasoline, and burnt alive.

The next day, the crew decides to begin filming their next music video for Vince's song, "See Me in The Mirror". Angela is dressed as a bride and Vince sings to his reflection in a mirror. As Angela walks down the stairs, she notices the shadow of a body that is resting against the upstairs window. The light outside flashes and the body crashes through the window. It is revealed to be Jos's corpse. Angela leaves the house in shock while the others search the roof to find out what happened. Vince runs after Angela as a mysterious car pulls up to the house.

The four armed men con their way into the house and quickly overpower the crew. They wait inside until Vince and Angela return. As they try to come in, one of the men shoots and kills Angela by mistake, forcing Vince to escape.

Vince heads to the roof where he has a shootout with some of the armed men. Meanwhile, a pack of wild dogs break into the house and attack the crew and one of the armed men. Sandra and Marilou run upstairs, with the dogs chasing them while the Monster Dog appears and kills the others. Strangely the dogs become calm when Vince appears, allowing them to get to the car. Because the armed men had the keys, they have to go back and get them, leaving Marilou in the car alone.

Vince and Sandra return to the car with the keys after another run in with a gunman. As they drive off, Marilou's corpse falls on Sandra and the Monster Dog attacks Vince from the back seat. Sandra jumps out and hears the car get destroyed with the sound of a gunshot. She finds the old man, who tells her about how he was attacked by Vince's father, which resulted in him becoming a "lycanthrope". The old man dies after telling Sandra that he has bitten Vince and that Vince will now become a werewolf. Sandra leaves to find Vince, who tells her to kill him before he turns into a werewolf. As Vince begins his transformation into the Monster Dog, Sandra shoots him.

The film ends with a reprise of the "Identity Crisis" video, now interspersed with clips from the story.

== Cast ==
- Alice Cooper as Vincent Raven
- Victoria Vera as Sandra
- Carlos Santurio as Frank
- Pepa Sarsa (credited as Jose Sarsa) as Marilou
- Pepita James as Angela
- Emilio Linder as Jordan
- Ricardo Palacios as Sheriff Morrison
- Barta Barri (credited as B. Barta Barri) as Old Man

== Production ==
Claudio Fragasso had been working as a screenwriter since the mid-1970s. In the 1980s, he often worked with Bruno Mattei as an uncredited co-director on women in prison films and gory horror movies. Dutch producer Eduard Salui saw Mattei and Fragasso's Rats: Night of Terror (1984), and subsequently suggested to Fragasso that he make another horror feature involving animals, for the home video market. Fragasso and his wife Rossella Drudi then wrote a script influenced by An American Werewolf in London and The Howling (both 1981).

Cooper is an American musician noted for his use of horror and macabre imagery. In an interview several months after the film's initial video release, he said that he had selected Monster Dog from numerous scripts submitted to him because "I didn't want to do a heavy-budget movie. If I do one of these I want to make sure it's sleazy. I want it to be really cheap." He added, laughing, "I got a lot of money for it. I think I was the biggest part of the budget." He deliberately chose a direct-to-video feature. In 2012, he noted that he had agreed to do the film soon after completing treatment for alcoholism, "and I really wanted to see if I could work sober." He thought that the responsibilities of being a lead actor in a movie would be "a real good test".

Line producer Carlos Aured spoke positively of Cooper, who he said had only two requests: a supply of cold Coca-Cola, and a VCR in his room so he could watch old Westerns. During filming, Cooper took weekends off to play golf, according to Aured. Vera would recall the film as "wretched and unpleasant, but I had a tremendous time together with Alice; he is a very fabulous and funny person." Fragasso also remembered Cooper fondly, saying, "I developed a good working relationship with Cooper ... [he] has a passion for horror movies, and every night we would watch them together as if we were little boys!"

Monster Dog was filmed in five weeks. The movie was shot back-to back with another horror feature, The Falling (1986), in Torrelodones, Spain. Fragasso said that numerous delays were caused by the special effects, which were all shot in the final week. The monster's head, a large puppet, broke in the first scene in which it was used, resulting in part of the script being rewritten to work around the prop's lack of functionality.

The film was shot MOS with each actor delivering lines in his/her native tongue with dialogue to be added later Cooper's character dialogue was re-recorded by Ted Rusoff.

Fragasso claimed that Sarlui had edited the movie without his involvement, and that about 20 minutes had been cut, including the best scenes; he asserted that "what has circulated on VHS and DVD is not the film that I shot." However, Fragasso and Drudi would later say that the cuts had been made for faster pacing. Four additional editors are credited on the movie.

== Soundtrack ==
The two songs performed by Cooper in the film were not released until 1999, when they appeared on the box set The Life and Crimes of Alice Cooper. In 2012, a 7-inch single with both songs was released, in a limited edition of 100 copies. Two songs in the movie were composed by Teddy Bautista, a Spanish arranger and composer.

== Release ==
Although some sources state that Monster Dog was theatrically released in Italy in December 1984, records show that it was not submitted for classification under Italy's rating system. Its first release was by Trans World Entertainment on home video in United States, on June 15, 1986. It was released theatrically by Union Films S.A. on August 16, 1988, in Spain, where it sold 53,438 tickets and grossed an amount equivalent to €151,303 in 2023.

== See also ==
- Alice Cooper filmography
- List of horror films of 1986
- List of Spanish films of 1986
