= White Apache =

1986 film

- Directed by: Bruno Mattei
- Screenplay by: Francesco Prosperi
- Story by: Roberto Di Girolamo
- Cinematography: Julio Burgos; Luigi Ciccarese
- Edited by: Vincenzo Vanni
- Music by: Luigi Ceccarelli
- Production companies: Beatrice Films; Multivideo
- Distributed by: Indipendenti Regionali
- Release dates: 1986; 27 May 1987 (Spain)
- Countries: Italy; Spain
- Language: Italian

White Apache (Italian: Bianco Apache) is a 1986 Western film directed by Bruno Mattei. The film was an Italian and Spanish co-production between Beatrice Films and Multivideo.

== Plot ==
After heavy gunfire in a clash with some outlaw, a pregnant woman is the only survivor of a caravan. Found by the local Apache, the woman who is dying is brought to the village, where she dies giving birth to a child. The Apache name the child Shining Sky.

As Shining Sky grows, he catches the eye, and eventually wins the heart, of Rising Sun, one of his red neighbors. Alas, he's also judged by a lot of his red neighbors for being white. One day, during a joust, Shining Sky accidentally kills the redfellow he's jousting. The other Apache soon decide that it's about time that Shining Sky was reunited with the race of his birth. They warn him, though, to not tell them that he was raised by the Apache, for most whitefolk are biased against redfolk.

Among whitefolk, Shining Sky impresses a rancher, by subduing an ornery horse. This way, he wins a home and a job. He also catches the eye of a white noblewoman, who finds him attractive and mysterious...at first. In time, though, Shining Sky learns that the noblewoman he's fallen for is a codependent of all of the white men who hunt redfolk as if they were pronghorn. They have an argument...which ends in the noblewoman tearing her own raiment, and framing Shining Sky for having raped her.

The whitefolk hang Shining Sky from a tree and leave him there. In time, though, an Apache shaman passes by, and cuts him down. Soon after, whitefolk attack the Apache villages. Shining Sky is soon reunited with Rising Sun. While on the run together, they have a child.

White men torment, and eventually kill, Rising Sun, in a semi-successful bid to draw Shining Sky out. Shining Sky impales their leader with a spear. Dying, he crawls over to Rising Sun's dying body, and lies atop her, so he can be with her. All around them, the white men close in, to finish them off... Alas, one of them makes a signal, and they all flee.

The late couple has left their baby hidden near a rock. An Apache shaman comes by and finds the baby. He collects it in his arms and takes it to his village...thus presumably repeating the cycle of the movie's plot.

== Cast ==
- Sebastian Harrison as Shining Sky
- Lola Forner as Rising Sun
- Alberto Farnese as The Governor
- Charly Bravo as Ryder
- Cinzia De Ponti as Isabella
- Charles Borromel as Crazy Bull
- José Canalejas as White Bear
- Luciano Pigozzi as Cribbens

== Production ==
While only Mattei is credited, some sources such as Kevin Grant's book Any Gun Can Play state that Claudio Fragasso also directed the film uncredited. On discussing their collaborations on The Other Hell and The True Story of the Nuns of Monza, Fragasso stated, he would shoot the film at the same time Mattei was shooting the other which was also done with their two woman in prison films Violence in a Women's Prison and Women's Prison Massacre and the Westerns Scalps and White Apache. Mattei stated otherwise, that Fragasso was an assistant director on these films, and nothing more.

== Release ==
White Apache was first released in 1986. was released in Spain on 27 May 1987. The film was also released as Apache Kid. In the uncut versions of both White Apache and Scalps contain scenes of scalping, dismemberment and other violence.

== Reception ==
From retrospective reviews, in their book Dizionario del cinema italiano, Roberto Chiti and Roberto Poppi noted the film had a poor story, modest acting and was hastily directed while praised its attempt to develop characters in the story.
