= List of awards and nominations received by the Who =

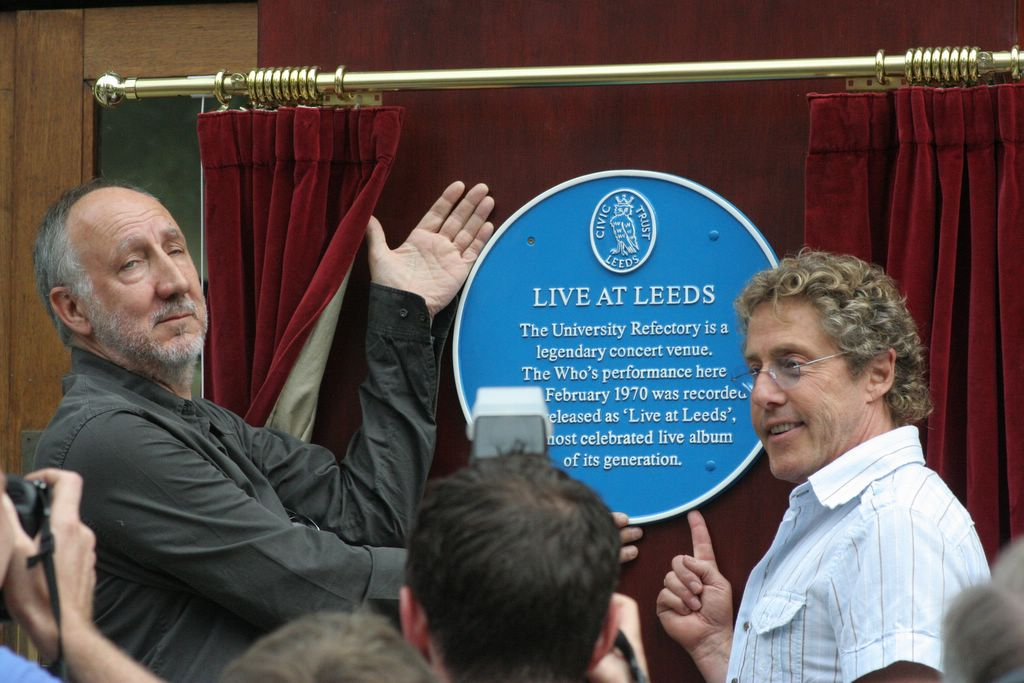
Townshend and Daltrey unveil a blue plaque at Leeds University on 17 June 2006, to commemorate their 1970 album Live at Leeds

The Who are one of the most critically acclaimed rock bands, and have received numerous awards and accolades that reflect both their popularity and commercial success.

== Awards ==
The Who were inducted into the Rock and Roll Hall of Fame in 1990, the UK Music Hall of Fame in 2005, and won the first annual Freddie Mercury Lifetime Achievement in Live Music Award in 2006. They received a Lifetime Achievement Award from the British Phonographic Industry in 1988, and from the Grammy Foundation in 2001, for creative contributions of outstanding artistic significance to the field of recording. Tommy was inducted into the Grammy Hall of Fame in 1998, "My Generation" in 1999 and Who's Next in 2007. My Generation was selected for preservation in the United States National Recording Registry in 2009. "Baba O'Riley", "Go to the Mirror!", "I Can See For Miles" and "My Generation", were included in The Rock and Roll Hall of Fame's 500 Songs that Shaped Rock and Roll. The Broadway version of Tommy, The Who's Tommy, won five Tony Awards and three Drama Desk Awards in 1993, while the London version won three Laurence Olivier Awards in 1997. Similarly, the movie adaptation of Tommy won the award for "Rock Movie of the Year" in the first annual Rock Music Awards in 1975. In 1974, NME awarded "5:15" the "Best British Single" award. Similarly, NME awarded Keith Moon the award for "Best Drummer" in 1978. The following year, NME awarded the film Quadrophenia the "Film of the Year" award. In 2005, the Who received the Nordoff Robbins Silver Clef Award for their outstanding contribution to music.

At the 31st annual awards ceremony on 7 December 2008, Townshend and Daltrey received Kennedy Center Honors; the first rock band to be so honoured. VH1 Rock Honors 2008 paid homage to the Who with tribute performances from Pearl Jam, Foo Fighters, Flaming Lips, Incubus and Tenacious D. On 12 March 2011, Roger Daltrey received the Steiger Award for excellence in music. Roger Daltrey and Pete Townshend received the Classic Album Award for Quadrophenia from the Classic Rock Roll of Honour Awards at The Roundhouse, 9 November 2011, in London, England.

On 6 September 2012, it was announced that Pete Townshend will be presented with the prestigious Les Paul Award at the 28th Annual TEC Awards on 25 January 2013. According to Michael Braunstein, Executive Director of the Les Paul Foundation, he said "Pete Townshend personifies both guitar wizardry and technical prowess in both studio and live music performance. He is a true original and a natural choice for the Les Paul Award honor".

== Album awards ==
The Who had seven albums on Rolling Stone's 500 Greatest Albums of All Time list in 2003, more than any other act with the exceptions of the Beatles, Bob Dylan, the Rolling Stones and Bruce Springsteen. "Baba O'Riley", "My Generation" and "Won't Get Fooled Again" were ranked at No. 159, No. 232, and No. 295. respectively on Rolling Stone's list of "500 Greatest Songs of All Time" in 2021. Furthermore, "My Generation" and "I Can See For Miles" ranked at No.3 and No.10 respectively on "Your Favorite British Invasion Songs" readers' poll and the documentary The Kids Are Alright ranked at No.5. on Rolling Stone's readers' poll. "Baba O'Riley" was ranked No. 11 on Ultimate Classic Rock's list of "Top 100 Classic Rock Songs" and "My Generation" at No.6 on its "Top 10 Drum Songs" list. VH1 ranked "Won't Get Fooled Again" and "My Generation" at No.6 and No.37 respectively on its list of "100 Greatest Hard Rock Songs" in 2009. The Guardian placed My Generation at No.36 on its list of "The 50 Albums That Changed Music" in 2006. ClassicRockReview.com awarded Who's Next as the "Album of the Year – 1971" by saying "Perhaps THE most complete rock album in history, Who's Next has just about everything". Guitar World magazine ranked Who's Next at No.23 on its "Top 50 Greatest Guitar Albums" list. Q magazine ranked "I Can't Explain" at No.24 on "The 50 Most Exciting Tunes Ever" list in 2002. Similarly, in a readers' poll, Q ranked Who's Next at No.63 in 2003 and then at No.56 in 2006 on its list of "100 Greatest Albums Ever". In 2007, Q ranked Live at Leeds at No.6 on "The 20 Loudest Albums of All Time" list while NME magazine put it at No.3 on its list of "Ten Great Live Albums" in 2011. NME placed Tommy and My Generation at No.16 and No.22 respectively on its list of "NME Writers All Time Top 100" in 1974. Likewise, "My Generation" was also named the best debut album in 1965 and its self-titled song was placed on the list of "75 Tunes That Defined Rock 'N' Roll" by NME. In 2007, IGN placed Quadrophenia at No.1 in their list of the "Greatest Classic Rock Albums of All Time". According to BestAlbumsEver.com, known for compiling databases and "Best Of" lists for albums, Who's Next ranks at No.2 in the best albums of 1971, at No.7 in the best albums of the 1970s and at No.25 in the "Overall Greatest Album" list, making it the Who's most successful album in their career.

=== Band awards ===
The Who are ranked No. 3 on About.com's "Top 50 Classic Rock Bands". Rolling Stone also ranked them No. 29 on its "100 Greatest Artists of All Time" list and No.3 on its "Top Ten Live Acts of All Time" readers' poll list in 2011. The Who are ranked No. 2 on Classic Rock's "50 Best Live Acts of All Time". Yahoo Voices ranked them at No.3 on "Top 10 Best Live Rock Bands of All Time" list. The Who were ranked No. 9 on VH1's "100 Greatest Artists of all time" in 1998, then No. 13 in 2010, and No. 8 on VH1's "100 Greatest Hard Rock Artists" in 2000. Q magazine ranked the Who at No.7 on its list of "50 Bands You Must See Before You Die". Likewise, they placed the Who's gig at University of Leeds in 1970 on the list of "The Best Gigs Ever". BestEverAlbums.com ranks them at No.13 on "Best Bands of All Time" list (based on album rankings and points only). For a number of years, The Guinness Book of World Records listed the Who as the record holder for "The Loudest Band in the World" at 126 dB, measured at a distance of 32 meters from the speakers at a concert at The Valley on 31 May 1976.

== Individual awards ==
Individually, each of the original members of the band received accolades throughout their music careers. Roger Daltrey was ranked No. 61 on Rolling Stone's list of "100 Greatest Singers" in 2011. Pete Townshend was ranked No. 3 in Dave Marsh's list of "Best Guitarists" in The New Book of Rock Lists, No. 10 in Gibson.com's list of the "Top 50 Guitarists", and No. 10 again in Rolling Stone's updated 2011 list of the "100 Greatest Guitarists". In 2000, Guitar magazine named John Entwistle "Bassist of the Millennium" in a readers' poll. J. D. Considine ranked Entwistle No. 9 on his list of "Top 50 Bass Players" and was also named the second best bassist on Creem magazine's 1974 Reader Poll Results. In 2011, a Rolling Stone reader poll selected Entwistle as the No. 1 bassist of all time. Gibson.com ranked Entwistle at No.7 on its list of "Top 10 Metal and Hard Rock Bass Players" in September 2012. Keith Moon was ranked at No. 1 on Dave Marsh's The New Book of Rock Lists of "The 50 Greatest Rock 'n' Roll Drummers". Similarly, he was ranked at No.2 on Rolling Stone's "The Best Drummers of All Time" readers' poll and No.10 on "Top 10 Greatest Dead Rock Stars" readers' poll in 2011.
