= Reb Brown =

American actor (born 1948)

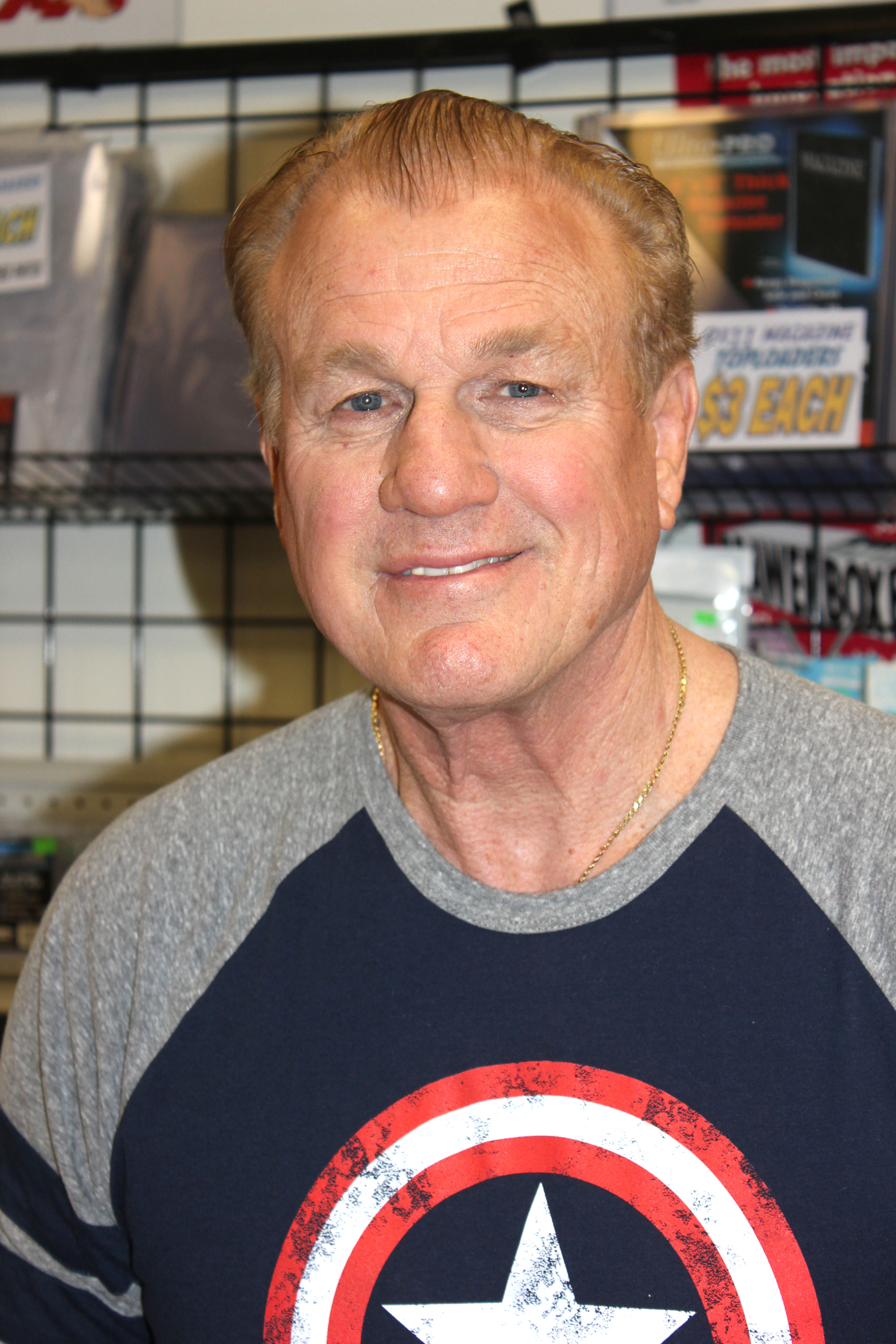
- Brown in 2018
- Born: Robert Edward Brown; April 29, 1948 (age 78); Los Angeles, California, U.S.
- Other name: Robert Brown
- Occupation: Actor
- Years active: 1973–present
- Spouse: Cisse Cameron (m. 1979)
- Website: rebbrownofficialwebsite.com

Robert Edward "Reb" Brown (born April 29, 1948) is an American actor. Born in the Los Angeles area, Brown played football in high school and college. He first appeared on film and television in the early 1970s, playing minor or supporting roles up until 1979, where he played Captain America in two made-for-TV films.

Following this, Brown played supporting roles in major Hollywood productions, his most notable being Ted Kotcheff's Uncommon Valor which was a box-office success. Also during this time Brown played many lead roles in genre films including: Yor, the Hunter from the Future (1983), Howling II: Your Sister Is a Werewolf (1985), Strike Commando (1987), Space Mutiny (1988), Robowar (1988), Flight of the Intruder (1991), among others. Brown's most significant role of that era was in Philippe Mora's Australian film Death of a Soldier. Based on a true story, he plays Private Edward Leonski. His performance was critically acclaimed, and was nominated for Best Lead Actor in a Dramatic Role by the Australian Film Institute.

In the 1990s, Brown went on a hiatus and started to act again in 2012.

== Early life and education ==
Brown's father was a policeman who had also been a singer. He grew up in the Los Angeles area and played football at Temple City High School. After graduating in 1966, he received a scholarship to play fullback at the University of Southern California during the 1967 season. He ended up losing the starting running back position to another student, O. J. Simpson, and Brown decided to transfer to another college in the Los Angeles area.

== Career ==
When he began acting, there was already a Robert Brown in the Screen Actor's Guild, so he took his initials, Reb, as his first name for acting.

In 1973, Brown acted in Bernard L. Kowalski's film Sssssss.

Also that year, he acted in the made-for-television film The Girl Most Likely to...

He later appeared in guest starring roles in several Universal Studios-produced television series, including Emergency!, Marcus Welby, M.D., Kojak, The Eddie Capra Mysteries, and The Rockford Files. He also appeared as Rebel, a southern boy who has a fight with Ralph Malph in Happy Days, and played Jim Bridger in the all-star miniseries Centennial. He also appeared in Three's Company as Elmo, a date for Chrissy Snow.

In 1978, in John Milius's Big Wednesday, Brown played the role of "Enforcer."

In 1979, he also played Captain America in two made-for-TV films, Captain America and Captain America II: Death Too Soon. It was part of the same development deal that yielded the Lou Ferrigno vehicle, The Incredible Hulk.

Also that year, he had a supporting role as an intimidating football player who joins a basketball team in Jack Smight's sport comedy Fast Break. Furthermore, he played a role in Paul Schrader's film Hardcore.

In 1982, Brown acted in Albert Pyun's The Sword and the Sorcerer.

In 1983, Brown played the lead role in Antonio Margheriti's Science fiction film, Yor, the Hunter from the Future. The film was poorly reviewed. However, the film was a financial success. The director stated that Columbia distributed 1400 prints of the film and that it was "one of the most successful pictures of my life." The film grossed $2,810,199 at the US box office and ranked 121 as one of the top earners of that year.

Also that year he was in the supporting cast of Ted Kotcheff's Uncommon Valor. He played Blaster, a Vietnam veteran character who trains with other vets in a P.O.W. rescue operation. The film was a box-office hit, one of the top-earning films of 1983. This was considered a surprise at the time because of the film's lack of stars and the fact it had a lot of competition. The film grossed $30,503,151 at the US box office and ranked 69 as one of the top earners of that year.

In 1985, Brown starred in Philippe Mora's Howling II: Your Sister Is a Werewolf.

In 1986, Brown re-united with director Mora for the Australian film Death of a Soldier. Based on a true story, it tells the story of serial killer, Private Edward Leonski, who committed his crimes and went to court in Melbourne, during World War II. The film received many good reviews, and Brown's performance was acclaimed. Kevin Thomas of The Los Angeles Times said his performance had "an impressive complexity and range of emotions." Brown received a nomination for Best Lead Actor in a Dramatic Role by the Australian Film Institute.

In 1987, Brown co-led with Christopher Connelly in Bruno Mattei's action film Strike Commando.

In 1988, Brown starred in David Winters's space opera science fiction film Space Mutiny. Winters said he hired Brown for the lead due to the positive reviews he received for a previous Australian film and that he hired his wife Cisse Cameron because Brown asked if he had a part for her. The film has the reputation of being an amusing, unintentionally funny, and campy B-movie.

Also that year, he acted in Rick Rosenthal's Distant Thunder, and reunited with director Mattei for to play the lead in Robowar.

In 1989, Brown co-led with Lou Ferrigno in the action film Cage playing Vietnam War veterans buddies. They would later reunite for Cage II (1994).

In 1990, Brown acted in Street Hunter.

In 1991, he acted in John Milius's Flight of the Intruder.

He appeared in the third-season Miami Vice episode "Viking Bikers from Hell", in which he played a sociopathic biker, avenging his buddy's recent death.

After not appearing on screen in eighteen years, Brown co-starred in the 2012 film, Night Claws.

== Personal life ==
Brown married actress Cisse Cameron in 1979.

== Filmography ==
=== Film ===
| Year | Title | | |
|---|---|---|---|
| 1973 | Sssssss | Steve Randall | |
| 1974 | Earthquake | Boy on Motorcycle | Uncredited - scene not used in the theatrical release. Added back in the 1976 television version |
| 1978 | Big Wednesday | "Enforcer" | |
| 1979 | Fast Break | Sam "Bull" Newton | |
| 1979 | Hardcore | Manager/Bouncer | |
| 1979 | Captain America | Steve Rogers/Captain America | TV movie |
| 1979 | Captain America II: Death Too Soon | Steve Rogers/Captain America | TV movie |
| 1983 | Yor, the Hunter from the Future | Yor | |
| 1983 | Uncommon Valor | "Blaster" | |
| 1985 | Howling II: Your Sister Is a Werewolf | Ben White | |
| 1986 | Death of a Soldier | Private Edward J. Leonski | |
| 1987 | Strike Commando | Michael Ransom | |
| 1988 | White Ghost | Major Cross | |
| 1988 | Space Mutiny | Dave Ryder | |
| 1988 | Robowar | Major Marphy Black | |
| 1988 | Mercenary Fighters | T.J. Christian | |
| 1988 | The Firing Line | Mark Hardin | |
| 1988 | Distant Thunder | Harvey NITZ | |
| 1989 | Cage | Scott Monroe | |
| 1990 | Street Hunter | Colonel Walsh | |
| 1990 | Last Flight to Hell | Mitch Taylor | |
| 1994 | Cage II | Scott Monroe | |
| 2012 | Night Claws | Sheriff Kelly | |
| 2016 | Surge of Power: Revenge of the Sequel | Roger "Star" Stevenson | |

=== Television ===
| Year | Title | Role | Notes |
|---|---|---|---|
| 1973 | The Girl Most Likely to... | Football Player | TV movie |
| 1974 | Kojak | Furniture Man | Episode: "Last Rites for a Dead Priest" |
| 1974-1975 | The Six Million Dollar Man | Officer Atkins/2nd Radio Operator | 2 episodes |
| 1975 | Kolchak: The Night Stalker | 2nd Young Man | Episode: "The Youth Killer" |
| 1975 | The Rockford Files | Lifeguard (uncredited) | Episode: "Gearjammers, Part 1" |
| 1976-1977 | Chico and the Man | Virgil/Frank Tubbs | 2 episodes |
| 1977 | Happy Days | Rebel E. Lee | Episode: "Requiem for a Malph" |
| 1977 | The Hardy Boys/Nancy Drew Mysteries | Tony Rosselli | Episode: "The Mystery of the Ghostwriters' Curse" |
| 1977 | CHiPs | Officer Brouliette | 3 episodes |
| 1978 | Fantasy Island | Greg | Episode: "Bet a Million/Mr. Irresistable" |
| 1979 | Three's Company | Elmo Hacker | Episode: "Ralph's Rival" |
| 1980 | Alice | Willy | Episode: "Cook's Tour" |
| 1980 | The Facts of Life | I.D. Checker | Episode: "The New Girl, Part 1" |
| 1981 | Goldie and the Boxer Go to Hollywood | Brian Kilpatrick/Johnny Gem | TV movie |
| 1981 | The Love Boat | Carl Williams | Episode: "Isaac's Teacher/Seal of Approval/The Successor" |
| 1987 | Miami Vice | Reb Gustafson | Episode: "Viking Bikers from Hell" |
| 1995 | Hercules: The Legendary Journeys | Jarton | Episode: "The Vanishing Dead"" |

== Works cited ==
- Curti, Roberto (2016). Diabolika: Supercriminals, Superheroes and the Comic Book Universe in Italian Cinema. Midnight Marquee Press. ISBN 978-1-936168-60-6.
- Winters, David (2018). Tough guys do dance. Pensacola, Florida: Indigo River Publishing. ISBN 978-1-948080-27-9.
