= Zombi 3 =

1988 film directed by Lucio Fulci

- Theatrical release poster
- Directed by: Lucio Fulci; Bruno Mattei
- Screenplay by: Claudio Fragasso; Rossella Drudi
- Produced by: Franco Gaudenzi
- Starring: Deran Sarafian; Beatrice Ring; Ottaviano Dell'acqua
- Cinematography: Riccardo Grassetti
- Edited by: Alberto Moriani
- Music by: Stefano Mainetti
- Production company: Flora Film
- Distributed by: Variety Distribution
- Release dates: June 1988 (Paris); 29 July 1988 (Italy)
- Running time: 88 minutes
- Country: Italy
- Language: English

Zombi 3 is a 1988 Italian horror film directed by Lucio Fulci and Bruno Mattei and starring Deran Sarafian, Beatrice Ring, and Ottaviano Dell'acqua. The film is an in-name-only sequel to Fulci's Zombi 2, and the only official sequel to Zombi 2. The film is about a group of scientists at a top-secret research facility who are working on a biological weapon called Death One, which mutates and kills the living creatures and reanimates the dead. The weapon is leaked out of the facility, which leads to a spread of infection among soldiers and tourists in the area.

== Plot ==
In a covert biological weapons laboratory in the Philippines, scientists work on a serum called Death One, which reanimates the dead. When Dr. Alan Holder and his assistant Norma experiment on a deceased human test subject, the corpse reanimates and reacts violently, prompting Dr. Holder to resign from the project. As he prepares to surrender the serum to the military, a group of rival gunmen ambushes the facility, with the lone surviving criminal absconding with Death One.

During the ensuing chase, gunfire breaches the container with the serum. Dr. Holder initially shows no concern about the virus escaping in this manner, given its inability to survive more than 30 seconds in the presence of oxygen, until he learns that the criminal accidentally touched the serum and became infected. General Morton and his soldiers arrive at the Sweet River Resort, where the criminal had fled, to find that the criminal had infected a bellhop, killed a maid, and cut off his own hand in a failed attempt to stop the infection's spread before finally succumbing to the infection. Morton orders the patrons and staff to be killed and buried in a mass grave, and the criminal's remains are transported to the facility's incinerator. As Dr. Holder and Norma fear, the ashes disperse into the air, infecting an entire flock of nearby birds.

Meanwhile, a trio of G.I.s on vacation are looking for girls and encounter a nearby bus, whose passengers include Joe, Nancy, Carol, Lia, Suzanna, Jane, Jane's boyfriend Tom, and bus driver David. Nearby, a tourist named Patricia and her boyfriend, Glenn, discover the dead birds, which reanimate and attack them. The birds assault the bus while the G.I.s attempt to evacuate it, and Lia is bitten. Patricia and Glenn stop at a nearby garage but flee when a machete-wielding zombie attacks Patricia, and the garage explodes after she sets the zombie afire. The G.I.s and the bus party stop at the now deserted Sweet River Resort. The men find a crate of guns left behind by the soldiers and begin fortifying the resort while Carol and one of the G.I.s, Bo, drive off to seek help.

When their car breaks down, Carol goes looking for water but is mauled by zombies and becomes zombified after her legs are torn off. Bo flees as more zombies emerge, eventually joining Patricia and Glenn. Glenn dies and reanimates as a zombie on the way to the hospital, killing Bo while Patricia escapes.

Back at the lab, Dr. Holder and his team start work on an antidote to Death One. Meanwhile, Morton's men initiate an operation to eradicate the zombies, now identified by the codename "locusts", referencing the zombies' behavior pattern of swarming from town to town.

Jane and Tom are ambushed and killed by a zombie's head in the kitchen freezer at the hotel. Lia reanimates, kills, and devours Susanna and almost kills Nancy before being thrown off the balcony and killed. Kenny and Roger encounter Patricia as she arrives to break the news about Bo's demise, but zombies swarm the hotel. Before fleeing, Kenny, Roger, Patricia, Nancy, and David kill many zombies by using their newly acquired weapons.

The next morning, the survivors encounter some of Morton's soldiers, who kill David as he playfully chases a chicken. The other four escape as the final stage of Morton's zombie eradication begins, and Dr. Holder fears the atmospheric infection may not be confined to the island. Arriving at the nearby hospital, the four encounter a pregnant woman in labor. As Nancy helps deliver the newborn, Patricia battles zombie Glenn and beheads him, while Kenny and Roger battle Morton's cleanup crew. Nancy is mauled from behind by a zombie that sneaks behind her and is subsequently killed by the zombified newborn when it escapes the mother's womb. Meanwhile, Kenny, Roger, and Patricia escape to find more zombies. They make it to a helicopter, but only Kenny and Patricia escape, as Roger is attacked by the zombies while trying to join them and is killed by the cleanup crew, even after he begs the latter to spare his life.

Blue Heart, the DJ who provided commentary for much of the film, dedicates his next record to "all the undead around the world", having been infected himself. Upon hearing the broadcast, Kenny decides to return to the island, assuring Patricia that he intends to save what's left of humanity.

== Cast ==
- Deran Sarafian as Kenny
- Beatrice Ring as Patricia
- Ottaviano Dell'Acqua (credited as Richard Raymond) as Roger
- Massimo Vanni (credited as Alex McBride) as Bo
- Ulli Reinthaler as Nancy
- Marina Loi as Carol
- Deborah Bergamini as Lia

Additional uncredited cast

- Mike Monty as General Morton
- Robert Marius as Doctor Holder
- Antone Pagan as the terrorist
- Del Russel as the DJ Blue Heart
- Maricar Toengo as Suzanna

== Production ==
Rossella Drudi developed most of the script of Zombi 3 without credit. The film only credits Drudi's husband, Claudio Fragasso, who co-authored the screenplay. Their script set the film in the Philippines, as it was a cheap and convenient location to shoot. Zombi 3 was originally announced as a 3D film, but the film was never released in this format. Director Lucio Fulci went to the Philippines along with his daughter, Camilla Fulci, in late 1987 and spent six weeks shooting Zombi 3.

Fulci left the production partway through and opposing views were given for his departure, the first being an illness that left him unable to film and the second being that he was having disputes with producers. Fulci would later state that he "didn't finish making Zombie 3, but the reason wasn't anything to do with illness [...] there were arguments and so, I finished off an hour and a quarter of the film". Fulci stated that he could not get the script changed, which he deemed to be "dreadful", and modified it with his daughter. Fragasso stated that Fulci simplified his screenplay and shot a seventy-minute film, which shocked producer Franco Gaudenzi. Fragasso went on to state that after the final editing of the film, it had a running time of one hour and ten minutes, but felt like a slow montage, and was cut down further to 50 minutes.

Producer Gaudenzi was worried about the film and had second unit director Bruno Mattei brought in to work on the production with Fragasso in order to complete it. Mattei had been in the Philippines at the time filming Strike Commando 2, went home to spend Christmas with his family and later returned in January 1988 to film more scenes for Zombi 3. Both Fragasso and Mattei worked on new scenes, and since they could not get the main actors to return to filming, the new scenes became subplots.

In a 2002 interview, Mattei claimed that he shot about 40% of the film, including all the early scenes in the film and all of the subsequent scenes which feature the soldiers dressed in white anti-contamination suits. He elaborated that this included the entire beginning with the stolen suitcase, the helicopter scene, the scenes involving security guards storming a hotel room and the scenes where the zombies start to burn. Fragasso later said he directed a number of additional scenes involving the interactions between the scientists and the character of General Morton (played by an uncredited Mike Monty) in which that Mattei is credited with having directed, but Fragasso let Mattei take full credit because he did not want to get into a conflict later with Fulci. Both Fragasso and Mattei make cameos in the film as soldiers who are putting a corpse into an incinerator under the supervision of General Morton.

When asked if the film should be credited solely to Fulci, Mattei responded that it was "hard to say" and that "the film's soul is from Fulci. It was his object, not mine. I only took it over after the main production was finally finished. Fulci was informed about everything and there was little discussion about it."

== Release ==
Zombi 3 was screened at a Paris Horror Film Festival in June 1988. The film premiered in Italy on 29 July 1988, where it was released in a severely edited form.

Zombi 3 is regarded as the official follow-up to Zombi 2, although other films were released internationally that were also billed as sequels. These include Andrea Bianchi's Burial Ground, released as Zombi III: Nights of Terror, and Return of the Zombies, as Zombi 3.

=== Home media ===
In 2002, Zombi 3 was released on DVD in the USA by Media Blasters. The cut version of the film shown in Italy provided the majority of the master for this DVD. In the UK, the film was released on DVD under the title of Zombie Flesh Eaters 2, as part of Vipco's Vault of Horror collection. Vipco later re-issued Zombi 3 as part of their budget Screamtime Collection. In Germany, the film was released on DVD initially by Laser Paradise on July 2, 2001, in a Red Edition, and later, on December 31, 2003, by the same label, as part of a box set entitled the Lucio Fulci Collection. On May 29, 2018, Severin Films released Zombi 3 on DVD and Blu-ray in the U.S.A., featuring a 2K scan of the original uncut version, along with commentaries and interviews. The first 3,000 copies of the Blu-ray also included the film's soundtrack on CD.

== Reception ==
"I don't repudiate any of my movies, except Zombi 3. But that movie's not mine. It's the most foolish of my productions. It has been done by a group of idiots."

— Lucio Fulci on Zombi 3

Fulci also said later on that he didn't like the production and certainly not how certain producers mistreated Filipinos.

From a contemporary review, Philip Nutman and Mario Cortini wrote in Gorezone that Zombi 3 was less original than Fulci's Aenigma, and that its main problem was its budgetary restraints and that "when the makeup FX do happen, they're so damn amateurish that they're embarrassing."

From retrospective reviews, Video Watchdog commented that the film had "slow patches" but plenty of exciting (and extremely gory) highlights throughout" The review also commented on Stefano Mainetti's score that "certainly helps things along". Writing in The Zombie Movie Encyclopedia, academic Peter Dendle said, "Most of the movie is a quilt of scenes and motifs shamelessly pasted together from Dawn of the Dead and Return of the Living Dead, but fast pacing and continuous shooting help distract from the absence of plot or character development." Dread Central included the film in their top ten list of best viral outbreak films.

Reviewing the 2018 Severin Films Blu-ray for Rue Morgue, Michael Gingold called the film "a notorious patchwork begun by Fulci and finished by an uncredited Mattei". He wrote that although Fulci directed about two-thirds of the finished film, it features "little of his gory-Gothic style" beyond a set piece at a mist-covered lakeside, and that the "relentless nightmare logic" of Fulci's earlier Zombie and The Beyond was replaced by scenes borrowed from other zombie films and "a hectic pace that at least means something's always happening, though it doesn't add up to much genuine excitement". Scott Drebit of Daily Dead was more positive, describing the film as a collaboration between "a notoriously grumpy maestro and a couple of get it done journeymen" and "a great, goofy blend", and gave it four out of five.

== Bibliography ==
- Cortini, Mario; Nutman, Philip (January 1989). "Pastaland Splatter Roundup". Gorezone. No. 5. O'Quinn Studios, Inc.
- Howarth, Troy (2015). Splintered Visions: Lucio Fulci and His Films. Midnight Marquee Press, Inc. ISBN 978-1936168538.
- Kay, Glenn (2008). Zombie Movies: The Ultimate Guide. Chicago Review Press. ISBN 978-1569766835.
- Paul, Louis (2005). Italian Horror Film Directors. McFarland. ISBN 978-0-7864-8749-3.
- Thrower, Stephen (1999). Beyond Terror, the films of Lucio Fulci. FAB Press.
- TJ (2003). "Bruno Mattei Spezial: Zwischen Titten, Knarren und Runen" [Bruno Mattei Special: Between Tits, Guns and Runes]. X Rated (in German). No. 24.
