= Alice Cooper filmography =

Actor filmography

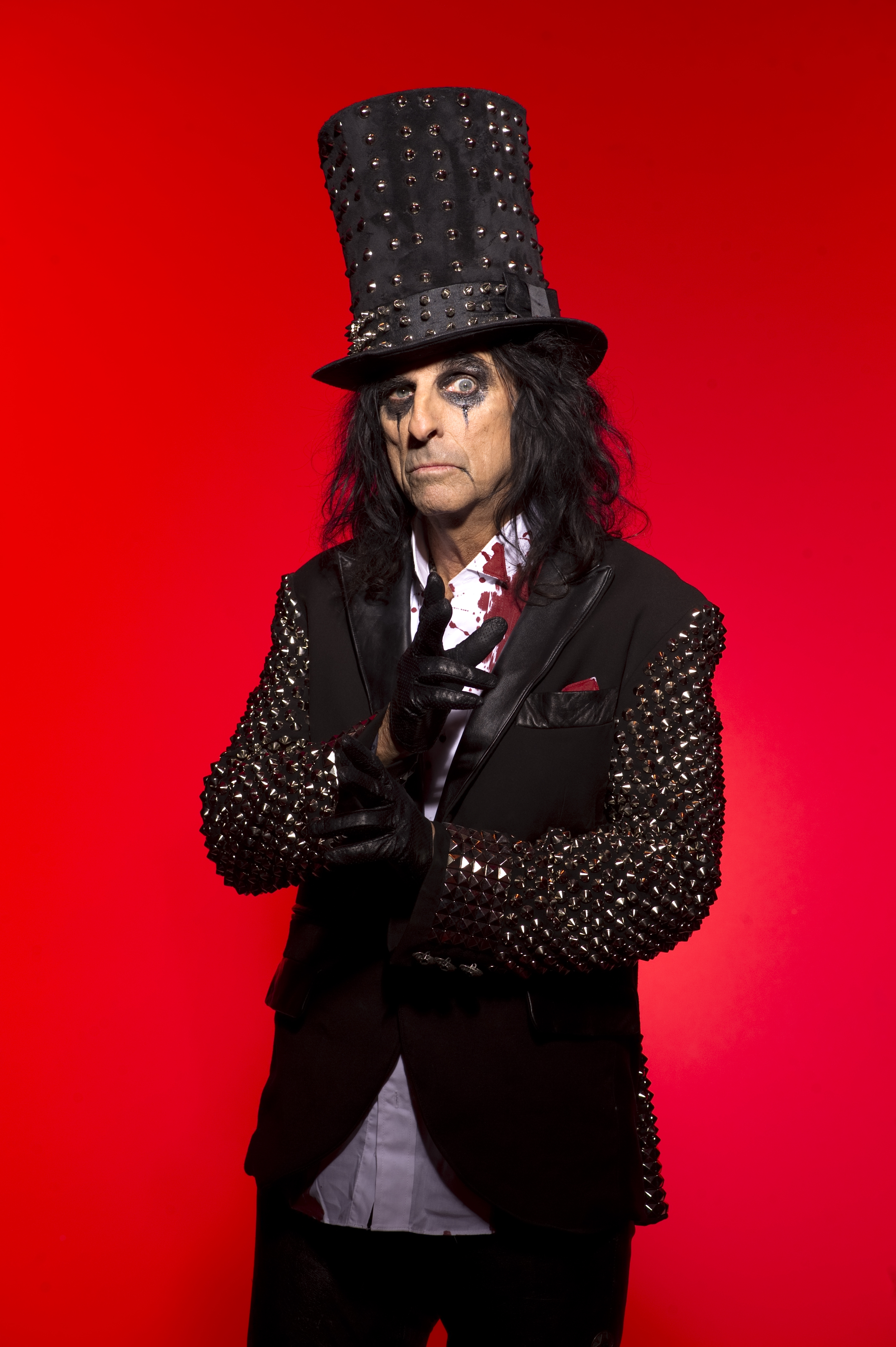
Alice Cooper in 2011

Alice Cooper, born in 1948 as Vincent Damon Furnier in Detroit, Michigan, is an American singer, songwriter, actor, and radio personality. At age 16 in 1964, Furnier started what would become a music career by recruiting four sports teammates to create a band for their local school talent show, calling themselves the Earwigs. The group used costumes and wigs to resemble the Beatles and won the talent show. Throughout the next four years, the band overcame lineup changes, band name changes, and even added to their stage presence—snakes, guillotines, electric chairs, fake blood, and various other horror imagery and props.

In 1968, the group chose Alice Cooper as a new band name. Furnier adopted the name for himself in 1975 to avoid legal complications of the band name ownership. The band realized it wasn't fully utilizing the stage show potential to garner publicity. Therefore, upon watching films to gain new inspiration, Cooper decided to don makeup and black eyeliner for events.

As the band fine tuned its stage presence, Alice Cooper gained attention from television and film producers. In 1970, Alice Cooper made a cameo appearance in Diary of a Mad Housewife with the original Alice Cooper band. Alice Cooper also appeared in Sextette alongside Mae West in 1978, Prince of Darkness as a street schizo in 1987, Wayne's World (1992), Dark Shadows (2012), Super Duper Alice Cooper (2014), and the Freddy Krueger franchise as Edward Underwood, Freddy's foster father. In the midst of films, Cooper made television appearances around the world. For example, he appeared on Alice Cooper a Paris, a French television special, in 1982. Cooper has appeared on several music documentaries, talk shows, game shows, sitcoms, music award ceremonies, and celebrity sports tournaments, just to name a few media categories.

Credited with helping to shape the look and sound of heavy metal, Alice Cooper is regarded as "The Godfather of Shock Rock." Over the years, Alice Cooper has been honored with numerous award nominations, many of which he has won. He was awarded a Hollywood Walk of Fame star in 2003. Alice Cooper, Michael Owen Bruce, Glen Buxton, Dennis Dunaway, and Neal Smith of the original Alice Cooper band were inducted into the Rock and Roll Hall of Fame by Rob Zombie on March 14, 2011.

== Filmography ==
Note: This is an incomplete filmography of appearances by Alice Cooper (as a person and as a band) in movies, television, and other visual media. Music videos, archived videos, commercials, and other "video shorts" are not included.

=== Film ===
Year	Title	Role	Notes	Ref(s)
1970	Diary of a Mad Housewife	Himself	Cameo with the original Alice Cooper band	
1971	We Have Come for Your Daughters	Himself	Later renamed Medicine Ball Caravan	
1974	Good to See You Again, Alice Cooper	Himself	Concert film	
1976	Welcome to My Nightmare	Steven/Himself	Concert film	
1978	Sextette	Waiter		
1978	Sgt. Pepper's Lonely Hearts Club Band	Father Sun		
1979	The Strange Case of Alice Cooper	Himself	Concert video	
1980	Roadie	Himself		
1986	Monster Dog	Vincent Raven	Spanish horror film	
1987	The Nightmare Returns	Himself	Concert video	
1987	Prince of Darkness	Street schizo		
1988	The Decline of Western Civilization Part II: The Metal Years	Himself		
1988	The Freddy Krueger Special	Himself		
1990	Alice Cooper Trashes the World	Himself	Concert video	
1991	Alice Cooper: Prime Cuts	Himself		
1991	Freddy's Dead: The Final Nightmare	Edward Underwood (Freddy's foster father)	Uncredited	
1992	Wayne's World	Himself		
1996	Fairway to Heaven	Himself		
1999	Sofia Eriksson moter Alice Cooper	Himself	Swedish film	
1999	British Rock Symphony	Himself	Concert film	
2000	Alice Cooper: Brutally Live	Himself	Concert film	
2000	Dario Argento: An Eye for Horror	Himself		
2001	The Attic Expeditions	Samuel Leventhal		
2001	25 Years of Punk	Himself	Narrated by Lou Reed	
2002	Adventures in Rock	Himself	Canadian documentary	
2003	Mayor of the Sunset Strip	Himself		
2004	John Carpenter: Fear Is Just the Beginning... The Man and His Movies	Himself		
2004	Spooks & Creeps	Himself	A collection of horror short films	
2005	Metal: A Headbanger's Journey	Himself		
2005	Unauthorized and Proud of It: The Story of Todd Loren's Rock 'N' Roll Comics	Himself		
2006	Alice Cooper: Live at Montreux 2005	Himself	Concert film and album package	
2006	I Did Not Know That	Himself		
2009	Suck	Vampire bartender		
2010	Lemmy	Himself		
2010	Never Sleep Again: The Elm Street Legacy	Himself	Documentary film	
2010	Mother of Rock: The Life and Times of Lillian Roxon	Himself		
2010	Horrorween	Himself	Cameo	
2011	Rock 'N' Roll Exposed: The Photography of Bob Gruen	Himself		
2012	Sunset Strip	Himself		
2012	Louder Than Love: The Grande Ballroom Story	Himself		
2012	Dark Shadows	Himself		
2012	A Band Called Death	Himself	Interviewee	
2012	Bigfoot	Himself		
2013	Who Shot Rock & Roll: The Film	Himself		
2013	Drew: The Man Behind the Poster	Himself		
2013	Supermensch: The Legend of Shep Gordon	Himself		
2013	Crystal Lake Memories: The Complete History of Friday the 13th	Himself/Rock Legend	Documentary film	
2013	Skum Rocks!	Narrator	Rockumentary	
2014	Super Duper Alice Cooper	Himself (Vincent Furnier)	Canadian biographical documentary	
2014	An Honest Liar	Himself (Rock star)		
2014	Wacken 3D	Himself		
2015	Danny Says	Himself	Documentary film	
2015	Smoke and Mirrors: The Story of Tom Savini	Himself		
2015	To Be Frank: Sinatra at 100	Himself		
2016	Hired Gun	Himself		
2017	Here's to Life: The Story of The Refreshments	Himself		
2017	Cum on Feel the Noize: The Story of How Rock Became Metal	Himself		
2018	Detroit: Comeback City	Himself	Musician	
2018	Hellfest	Himself	Concert film	
2018	Udo Lindenberg - MTV Unplugged - Live vom Atlantik	Himself	German film	
2018	Chuck Berry	Himself	Documentary film	
2019	Boy Howdy: The Story of Creem Magazine	Himself	Documentary film	
2019	Live from the Astroturf, Alice Cooper	Himself	Documentary/Concert film	
2019	Suzi Q	Himself	Australian documentary	
2019	House of Cardin	Himself	U.S. documentary film on Pierre Cardin	
2019	You Wanted the Best... You Got the Best: The Official KISS Movie	Himself	Pre-production	
2021	Rock Camp: The Movie	Himself	Documentary film	

=== Television ===
Year	Title	Role	Notes	Ref(s)
1970	Midsummer Rock	Himself	Concert	
1971	Whistle Test	Himself	1 Episode	
1971–1980	Beat-Club	Himself	German music program	
1972–1975	In Concert	Himself	2 Episodes	
1972–1994	Top of the Pops	Himself	Himself and Presenter; 13 Episodes	
1973	NME Awards	Himself	Won World Stage Band award	
1973	The Hollywood Squares (Daytime)	Himself	Panelist; 1 Episode	
1973	Rock-a-bye	Himself		
1974	NME Awards	Himself	Won World Stage Band award	
1974	16th Annual Grammy Awards	Himself		
1974	The Snoop Sisters	Prince	1 Episode: "The Divil Made Me Do It!"	
1975	The Smothers Brothers Show	Himself	1 Episode	
1975	Alice Cooper: The Nightmare	Steven	Conceptual television special	
1975	Dinah!	Himself	1 Episode	
1975–1976	The Mike Douglas Show	Himself	2 Episodes	
1975–1977	The Tonight Show Starring Johnny Carson	Himself	2 Episodes	
1976	Second Annual Rock Music Awards	Himself	Host and Presenter	
1976	Tony Orlando and Dawn	Himself	1 Episode: "Alice Cooper/George Carlin"	
1976	The Soupy Sales Show	Himself		
1977	All You Need Is Love: The Story of Popular Music	Himself	1 Episode: "Whatever Gets You Through the Night: Glitter Rock"	
1977	Rock Music Awards	Himself		
1977	Alice Cooper and Friends	Himself	Concert TV special	
1978	Grease Day USA	Himself		
1978	The Muppet Show	Himself	1 Episode: "Alice Cooper"	
1978	Hollywood's Diamond Jubilee	Himself	Cameo	
1978–1990	Good Morning America	Himself	2 Episodes	
1980	Pink Lady	Himself	Guest; 1 Episode: "Episode 5"	
1980	Cosas	Himself	1 Episode	
1982	Alice Cooper a Paris	Himself/Vincent Furnier	French TV special (France release only)	
1982	Rock 'n' Roll: The First 25 Years	Himself	Host	
1982	Riverside	Himself	1 Episode	
1984	26th Annual Grammy Awards	Himself	Nominated for Best Video Album: "The Nightmare" (video)	
1984–2019	Today	Himself	3 Episodes	
1986	The Tube	Himself	1 Episode	
1987	WrestleMania III	Himself		
1987	MusiCalifornia	Himself	1 Episode: "Crazy Hollywood"	
1989	31st Annual Grammy Awards	Himself		
1989	1989 MTV Video Music Awards	Himself	Co-Presenter for Best Group Video	
1990	17th Annual American Music Awards	Himself	Co-host and Music Performer	
1990	32nd Annual Grammy Awards	Himself		
1990	Hard 'N Heavy Volume 7	Himself	Video magazine	
1991	18th Annual American Music Awards	Himself		
1991	Ozzy Osbourne - Don't Blame Me: The Tales of Ozzy Osbourne	Himself		
1991	Slash & Burn: The Freddy Krueger Story	Himself		
1992	Aspel & Company	Himself	1 Episode	
1992	The Brian Conley Show	Himself		
1994	Parallel 9	Himself	1 Episode	
1994	The Big Breakfast	Himself	1 Episode	
1994	Noisy Mothers	Himself	1 Episode	
1994	Lista Top 40	Himself	1 Episode	
1994	Clive Anderson Talks Back	Himself	1 Episode	
1994	The State	Himself	1 Episode	
1994	A Celebration: The Music of Pete Townshend and The Who	Himself	Concert	
1995	22nd Annual American Music Awards	Himself		
1995	Something Wilder	Himself	1 Episode: "Hanging with Mr. Cooper"	
1995	Space Ghost Coast to Coast	Himself	1 Episode: "Girlie Show"	
1995	The History of Rock 'n' Roll	Himself	2 Episodes	
1995	Rock & Roll	Himself	2 Episodes	
1996	Dancing in the Street: a Rock and Roll History	Himself	1 Episode: "Hang on to Yourself"	
1996	VH1 Presents the 70's	Himself		
1997	Halloween... The Happy Haunting of America!	Himself		
1997	24th Annual American Music Awards	Himself		
1997	Pearl	Himself	1 Episode: "The Write Stuff: Part 1"	
1997	39th Annual Grammy Awards	Himself	Nominated for Best Metal Performance: "Hands of Death (Burn Baby Burn)" (track)	
1997	A Fistful of Alice	Himself	TV special	
1997	A Golfer's Travels with Peter Alliss	Himself	1 Episode: "Hawaii"	
1997	Eyegore Awards	Himself	Won the Eyegore Award; First recipient of the award	
1997–2011	Rage	Himself	2 Episodes	
1998	Masters of Fantasy	Himself	1 Episode: "Vincent Price"	
1998	Penn & Teller's Sin City Spectacular	Himself	1 Episode: "Episode #1.4"	
1999–2001	Behind the Music	Himself	2 episodes	
1999	Freakshow	Pirate Jack	Voice	
1999	Late Show with David Letterman	Himself	Guest and Performer; 1 Episode	
1999	Mark Lamarr Leaving the 20th Century	Himself	1 Episode	
1999	Spice Girls in America: A Tour Story	Himself		
2000	Trigger Happy TV	Himself	1 Episode	
2000	Top Ten	Himself	Presenter; 1 Episode: "Stadium Rock"	
2000	Power Vision - Pop Galerie	Himself	1 Episode: "KISS"	
2000	VH1's Where Are They Now?	Himself	1 Episode: "Bad Boys of Rock"	
2000	The Daily Show	Himself	1 Episode: "Alice Cooper"	
2000	The Beatles Revolution	Himself		
2000	VH1's 100 Greatest Artists of Hard Rock	Himself		
2000–2004	The Late Late Show with Craig Kilborn	Himself	3 Episodes	
2001	That '70s Show	Himself	Episode: "Radio Daze"	
2001–09	Rove Live	Himself	2 Episodes	
2002	Sӧndagsӧppet	Himself		
2002	I Love Muppets	Himself		
2002	One-Hit Wonders	Himself	6 Episodes	
2002	100 Greatest One Hit Wonders	Himself	Hosted by William Shatner	
2002–2003	V Graham Norton	Himself	2 Episodes	
2002–2011	The Tonight Show with Jay Leno	Himself	Guest and Performer; 3 Episodes	
2003	Die 70er Show	Himself	1 Episode	
2003	Summer Music Mania 2003	Himself	Performer	
2003	The Mullet Man Show	Himself	1 Episode: "Alice in Mulletland"	
2003	The 100 Greatest Scary Moments	Himself	Presented by Jimmy Carr	
2003	British Comedy Awards	Himself		
2003	Today with Des and Mel	Himself	1 Episode	
2003	Player$	Himself	1 Episode: "Of Tombs and Pirates"	
2004	The Great American Celebrity Spelling Bee	Himself		
2004	The 33rd Annual Juno Awards	Himself	Presenter	
2004	X-Rated: The Pop Videos They Tried to Ban	Himself		
2004–2011	Never Mind the Buzzcocks	Himself	Himself and Host; 2 Episodes	
2005	The British Soap Awards 2005	Himself	Presenter	
2005	The Kumars at No. 42	Himself	1 Episode	
2005	The Great Outdoors	Himself	1 Episode	
2005	Enough Rope with Andrew Denton	Himself	1 Episode	
2005	In Your Face: The Lost Episodes of the XWF	Himself	1 Episode	
2005	The Perfect Scary Movie	Himself		
2005	The Frank Skinner Show	Himself	1 Episode	
2005	HARDtalk Extra	Himself	1 Episode: "Alice Cooper"	
2005	Sound Off with Matt Pinfield	Himself	Guest	
2005–2007	The New Paul O'Grady Show	Himself	2 Episodes	
2005–2008	The Late Late Show with Craig Ferguson	Himself	9 Episodes	
2006	Graham Norton's Bigger Picture	Himself	1 Episode	
2006	Kings of Glam	Himself	TV documentary	
2006	Best Ever Muppet Moments	Himself		
2006	Monk	Himself	1 Episode: "Mr. Monk and the Garbage Strike"	
2006	All*Star Cup	Himself	Team USA	
2006	Hypaspace	Himself	1 Episode	
2006	Goolians: A Docu-Comedy	Himself		
2006	2nd Classic Rock Roll of Honour Awards	Himself	Won Living Legend award	
2006	40 Years of Star Trek	Himself (Vincent Furnier)		
2006	Heavy: The Story of Metal	Himself		
2007	The Graham Norton Show	Himself	1 Episode	
2007	E! True Hollywood Story	Himself	1 Episode: "Rock Star Wives"	
2007	Scream Awards 2007	Himself	Performer; Won Scream Rock Immortal Award	
2007	NRJ 12: Scream Awards	Himself		
2007	Final 24	Himself	1 Episode; "Keith Moon"	
2007–2009	Last Call with Carson Daly	Himself	2 Episodes	
2008	Anthony Bourdain: No Reservations	Himself	1 Episode: "U.S. Southwest"	
2008	Tout le monde en parle	Himself		
2008	100 Greatest Hard Rock Songs	Himself		
2008	One for the Fire: The Legacy of 'Night of the Living Dead'	Himself		
2008–2011	The Hour	Himself	2 Episodes	
2008–2011	Loose Women	Himself	2 Episodes	
2008–2012	The One Show	Himself	Guest; 4 Episodes	
2009	The 7PM Project	Himself	Guest; 1 Episode	
2009–10	Breakfast	Himself	2 Episodes	
2010	52nd Annual Grammy Awards	Himself	Presenter	
2010	12th NRJ Music Awards	Himself		
2010	I'm in a Rock 'n' Roll Band	Himself	2 Episodes	
2010	Golden Gods awards	Himself		
2010	American Idol	Himself	Performer; 1 Episode	
2010	Man v. Food	Himself	1 Episode: "Phoenix"	
2010	Celebrity Ghost Stories	Himself	1 Episode	
2010	Alan Carr: Chatty Man	Himself	1 Episode	
2010	Gomorron	Himself	1 Episode	
2010	6th Marshall Classic Rock Roll of Honour Awards	Himself	Master of Ceremonies (Host)	
2010	Strictly Come Dancing	Himself	Week 5 musical guest; 1 Episode: "Halloween Week"	
2010	Daybreak	Himself	1 Episode	
2010	The Rob Brydon Show	Himself	1 Episode	
2010	Behind the Music: Remastered	Himself	Episode: "Alice Cooper"	
2010–11	Number One!	Himself	2 Episodes	
2010–12	That Metal Show	Himself	Guest; 2 Episodes	
2010–12	Later...with Jools Holland	Himself	2 Episodes	
2011	26th Annual Rock and Roll Hall of Fame Induction Ceremony	Himself	Inducted by Rob Zombie	
2011	The Joy Behar Show	Himself	1 Episode	
2011	Hoppus on Music	Himself	1 Episode	
2011	Road to Wacken	Himself		
2011	Revolver Golden Gods Awards	Himself	Won Golden God award; Rob Zombie presented award to Alice Cooper	
2011	Metal Hammer Golden Gods Awards	Himself	Host; Alice Cooper presented award to Rob Zombie	
2011	Kerrang! Awards 2011	Himself	Won Kerrang! Icon award	
2011	Top Gear	Himself	Guest; 1 Episode: "Series 17, Episode 1"	
2011	Lee Mack's All Star Cast	Himself	1 Episode	
2011	2011 Eyegore Awards	Himself	Named an honoree	
2011	The X Factor	Himself	Guest mentor; 1 Episode	
2011	Cinemassacre's Monster Madness	Freddy's foster father	1 Episode: "Freddy's Dead: The Final Nightmare"	
2011	Mark Lawson Talks to...	Himself	1 Episode: "Alice Cooper"	
2011	Talking Dead	Himself	Voice; 1 Episode: "Pretty Much Dead Already"	
2011–2012	Metal Evolution	Himself	3 Episodes	
2012	Room 101	Himself	1 Episode	
2012	Golden Gods Awards	Himself	Performer	
2012	Michael Douglas & Friends Celebrity Golf Tournament	Himself		
2012	2012 Eyegore Awards	Himself	Presenter	
2012	unCONventional	Himself	1 Episode: "School's Out for Ninja Turtles"	
2012	The High Fructose Adventures of Annoying Orange	Himself	1 Episode: "Generic Holiday Special"	
2012	Conan	Himself	Guest and Performer; 1 Episode: "Surprise, Fourth Graders, You're the Mets"	
2013	Rock and Roll Roast of Dee Snider	Himself		
2013	Ke$ha: My Crazy Beautiful Life	Himself	1 Episode: "Animal on the Hunt"	
2013	Evening Urgant	Himself	1 Episode	
2013	Canada's Walk of Fame: Celebrating 15 Years	Himself		
2013	Great American Rock Anthems: Turn It Up to 11	Himself		
2014	Good Day L.A.	Himself	1 Episode	
2014	Slash: Raised on the Sunset Strip	Himself		
2014	The Art of McCartney	Himself		
2015	An Evening with Alice Cooper	Himself		
2015	Kerrang! Awards 2015	Himself	Won Kerrang! Legend award; Won Best Radio Show award	
2015	Fox and Friends	Himself	Musical guest; 1 Episode	
2015	The Late Late Show with James Corden	Himself	1 Episode: "Pauley Perrette/Alice Cooper/Ian Karmel"	
2015	11th Classic Rock Roll of Honour Awards	Himself	Won Classic Album award for "Welcome to My Nightmare"	
2016	E! Live from the Red Carpet	Himself	1 Episode: "The 2016 Grammy Awards"	
2016	Independent Lens	Himself	1 Episode: "An Honest Liar"	
2016	Carolina Rebellion	Himself		
2016	Talk Stoop	Himself	1 Episode: "Fashion Forward"	
2016	Kerrang! Awards 2016	Himself	Won Best Radio Show award	
2016	Rock & Roll Road Trip with Sammy Hagar	Himself	Guest; 2 Episodes	
2016	Gotta Keep Dreamin	Himself		
2016–2017	Jimmy Kimmel Live!	Himself	Interviewee and Musical guest; 2 Episodes	
2017	Power Chord TV	Himself		
2017	Rock in Rio	Himself	Performer; 1 Episode	
2017	The Year in Memoriam	Himself		
2018	Jesus Christ Superstar Live in Concert	King Herod	Musical special	
2018	Urban Myths	Himself	1 Episode: "The Dali and the Cooper"	
2018	SmartFem TV	Himself		
2018–2019	Celebrity Page	Himself	2 Episodes	
2019	61st Annual Grammy Awards	Himself	Nominated for Best Musical Theater Album: "Jesus Christ Superstar Live in Concert"	
2019–2021	Mickey Mouse Mixed-Up Adventures	Alistair Coop De Ville	Voice; 4 Episodes	
2019	Quotidien	Himself	1 Episode; French TV show	
2019	Expedition Unknown	Himself	1 Episode: "Cracking the Secret"	
2019	The Big Interview with Dan Rather	Himself	1 Episode: "Alice Cooper"	
2020	Bubble Guppies	Windy Pete	Guest (Voice); Episode: "Ocean Patrol!"	
2020	Duncanville	Himself	Voice; Episode: "Red Head Redemption"	

=== Video games ===
Year	Title	Role	Notes
2014	Family Guy: The Quest for Stuff	Himself	Voice

=== Other appearances ===
Year	Title	Notes	Ref(s)
1970s	The Hollywood Vampires	Founder; Celebrity drinking club headquartered at the Rainbow Bar and Grill	
1995–present	Alice Cooper's Solid Rock Foundation	Co-founder and President; Christian goodwill non-profit organization based in Arizona	
1998–2017	Alice Cooper'stown	Co-Owner and Partner; Restaurant in downtown Phoenix, AZ	
2003	Hollywood Walk of Fame	Inducted with a star	
2004	Honorary Doctorate of Performing Arts degree	Honoree; Grand Canyon University in Phoenix, AZ	
2004–present	Nights with Alice Cooper	Host; Radio show	
2012	Honorary Doctorate of Music degree	Honoree and Keynote Speaker; Musicians Institute in Los Angeles, CA	

== See also ==
- Alice Cooper Accolades
