= Shocking Dark =

1989 Italian film

- Poster for the film's release under the Terminator 2 name. This bears some similarity to the original Terminator poster.
- Directed by: Bruno Mattei
- Written by: Claudio Fragasso
- Produced by: Franco Gaudenzi
- Starring: Christopher Ahrens; Haven Tyler; Geretta Geretta; Fausto Lombardi
- Cinematography: Richard Grassetti
- Edited by: Bruno Mattei
- Music by: Carlo Maria Cordio
- Production company: Flora Film
- Distributed by: Variety Distribution
- Release date: 1989
- Running time: 90 minutes
- Country: Italy
- Language: Italian

Shocking Dark (also known as Terminator II, Terminator 2, Aliens 2, Aliennators, and Contaminator) (Killers of a Venice Beach) is a 1989 Italian science-fiction film written by Claudio Fragasso, produced by Franco Gaudenzi and directed by Bruno Mattei.

Although the film was promoted as a rip-off of James Cameron's The Terminator (1984), it is primarily a rip-off of Cameron's subsequent film Aliens (1986). It was released in some countries as Terminator II, as it had been made two years before Terminator 2: Judgment Day (1991).

== Background ==
Despite the film's original title and artwork presenting it as a sequel to The Terminator, it is not officially associated with that film. The plot has more in common with Aliens. Two years after Mattei's film came out, Terminator 2: Judgment Day (the official Terminator sequel) was released. Mattei's film was not released in the United States.

== Cast ==
- Cristopher Ahrens as Samuel Fuller
- Haven Tyler as Sara
- Geretta Giancarlo Field as Koster
- Fausto Lombardi (as Tony Lombardo) as Lieutenant Franzini
- Mark Steinborn as Commander Dalton Bond
- Dominica Coulson as Samantha
- Mark Zielinski as Stephano
- Clive Ricke as Drake
- Paul Norman Allen as Kowalsky
- Cortland Reilly as Caine
- Richard Ross as Price
- Bruce McFarland as Parson
- Al McFarland as Raphelson
- Arnold Schwarzenegger as T-800

== Release ==
Up until 2018, the film had never been released on video in the United States for legal reasons. It was released in countries such as Japan, Brazil, and the film's native country Italy.

Severin Films released the film (under its Shocking Dark title) on Blu-ray on 29 May 2018.
