= Robowar (film) =

Italian science fiction film

- Directed by: Bruno Mattei
- Written by: Claudio Fragasso; Rosella Drudi
- Produced by: Franco Gaudenzi
- Starring: Reb Brown; Catherine Hickland
- Cinematography: Richard Grassetti
- Edited by: Daniele Alabiso
- Music by: Al Festa
- Production company: Flora Film
- Distributed by: Indipendenti Regionali
- Release dates: September 9, 1989 (Japan); 1990 (Italy)
- Country: Italy

Robowar (Italian: Robowar - Robot da guerra) is a 1989 Italian science fiction action film directed by Bruno Mattei. The film features a group of military commandos going through a jungle and being stalked by a robot called Omega-1.

The film was shot in the Philippines and was one of the many Italian films following Apocalypse Now (1979) made with a Vietnam War-theme. Mattei added science fiction elements to Robowar after seeing the American film Predator and decided to make a similar film.

The film was released in Italy in 1990 and on early home video releases in Asia and Europe. Retrospective reviews of the film have derided it as a rip-off of Predator.

== Plot ==
Major Marphy Black leads a group of commandos through the jungles of an unnamed island, but unknown to all involved but Mascher, they are being stalked by Mascher's robot invention, Omega-1. Over Mascher's protests, the group first saves a volunteer hospital worker, Virgin, from a band of guerrillas, then take out the hospital camp, killing all the guerrillas there, also. At this point, the robot begins killing members of the commando group, one by one. That night, Mascher admits to Marphy that he created Omega-1, that it was acting sporadically, and that he was there to check out the match-up between the decorated Marphy and Omega-1.

The next day, they continue, and are further stalked by the robot. At one point, as Mascher reviews a computer to check Omega-1's location, one of the commandos tosses it into the river, declaring that Macscher is now in the same danger they are. Later, Mascher reveals the radio device which can destroy Omega-1, but the robot kills Mascher and others, leaving only Black and Virgin, and takes the radio destruct device. That night, Black listens to an audiotape given by Mascher, which reveals that Omega-1 is a human/machine hybrid, whose human parts were made up of the brain of Black's old friend, Lt. Martin Woodrie. Omega-1 attacks in the house they're hiding, but Virgin stuns the robot with acid, and Black blows up the house. Black and Virgin reach the shore, and try to signal the boat, but Omega-1 catches up, and chases Black into the jungle. Cornering him, the robot removes the visor of his mask, hands Black the destruct radio, and instructs him to key the destruct sequence. Black does so, and returns to the shore.

== Cast ==
- Reb Brown as Major Marphy Black
- Catherine Hickland as Virgin
- Massimo Vanni as Private Larry Guarino
- Romano Puppo as Corporal Neil Corey
- Max Laurel as Quang
- Jim Gaines as Sonny "Blood" Peel
- John P. Dulaney as Arthur "Papa Doc" Bray
- Mel Davidson as Mascher

== Production ==
Since the 1960s, the Philippines had been a popular shooting location of independent films. Producers such as Roger Corman would film there to take advantage of low cost of labor and access to military resources courtesy of dictator Ferdinand Marcos.

Following the release of Apocalypse Now (1979), the Philippines became a stand-in filming location to represent Vietnam. In Italy, director Antonio Margheriti banked on the popularity of Apocalypse Now with his film The Last Hunter (1980), the first Vietnam War-inspired film made in Italy. This led to the location to stand-in for various tropical locations such as Cambodia, Brazil and the Caribbean in Italian film productions.

Director Bruno Mattei shot several films between 1987 and 1988 on the Philippine island of Luzon such as Strike Commando (1987) and several others for Flora Film. The more science fiction-flavored film Robowar came together as the director had seen Predator (1987) and wanted to make a similar film. Among the cast was Reb Brown who was previously in Strike Commando. Actor John P. Dulaney was living in the Philippines at the time and took on the role. He stated that he was "overweight and didn't exactly fit the part of a guerrilla jungle fighter, but Bruno didn't seem to care. He may have also been desperate to find anyone for the part." The actor in the robot suit was various actors including Romano Puppo. The suit was built by Francesco and Gaetano Paolocci who built creatures for several films by Claudio Fragasso and Mattei.

Robowar was shot for six weeks. Fragasso who was filming After Death (1989) filled in for Mattei to shoot a sequence without any context for where or how it was set up in the film.

== Release ==
By the second half of the 1980s, it was difficult for Italian cinema to receive theatrical distribution. As films released to home video did not need to be sent to the rating board for a theatrical screening certificate, some productions saved money by releasing films direct-to-video. The films earliest availability included home video releases in Asia and Europe. In Japan, it was released on September 9, 1989 by Humax Pictures. Robot War received a release VISA for release in Italy on January 24, 1989. It was released in Italy in 1990. In Germany, the film had a home video release from Scala in February 1991. It had an 82 minute running time under the title Roboman.

== Reception ==
Donald C. Willis in Horror and Science Fiction Films IV (1997) summarized the film as unintentionally funny, and an "imperfect fusion of RoboCop and Predator." In the book Spinegrinders: The Movies Most Critics Won't Talk About, author Clive Davies described the film as being derivative of "Predator (1987) that becomes a "mindless bore after five minutes."
