= Claudio Fragasso =

Italian screenwriter and film director

- Born: 2 October 1951 (age 74)
- Other names: Clyde Anderson; Drake Floyd
- Occupations: Film director; screenwriter
- Years active: 1974–present
- Spouse: Rossella Drudi

Claudio Fragasso (born 2 October 1951) is a film director and screenwriter. Fragasso first attempted to make art films in the early 1970s, then became a screenwriter in the Italian film industry in the mid-1970s. Fragasso met director Bruno Mattei, which led to a ten-year partnership from 1980 to 1990 during which the two worked together closely on films, with Fragasso's contributions often going uncredited. Fragasso's wife Rossella Drudi was also a screenwriter and collaborated with him on a number of projects. Fragasso would later go on to write and direct his own films in the 1980s, including Monster Dog with rock musician Alice Cooper and After Death. Fragasso directed Troll 2 in 1989, which was later the topic of Best Worst Movie, a documentary film that discussed Troll 2's fandom.

== Filmmaking ==
Claudio Fragasso was born on 2 October 1951. Prior to directing, Claudio Fragasso worked as a screenwriter beginning in the mid-1970s. Fragasso had originally planned to make art films, and initially shot his films on Super 8 such as Passaggi (1977) and its follow-up Difendimi dalla Notte, with Fragasso noting "In Italy, to be considered important, you must shoot something like that." According to Fragasso, the screenplay for Il Medium was done specifically for director Silvio Amadio in 1975. The film however did not start production until 1979. Fragasso worked on the screenplays on several Italian crime thrillers in the 1970s.

=== 1980s ===
Fragasso met director Bruno Mattei when Mattei was still an assistant editor and they immediately got along well with one another as they both enjoyed genre films. In 1980, Mattei began a close collaboration with screenwriter Fragasso, beginning with The True Story of the Nun of Monza (1980) and ending with a comedy called Three For One (1990). The two worked closely together for that ten-year period (collaborating on 15 films) with Fragasso occasionally assuming the role of second unit, or assistant, director. Fragasso has stated he is a fan of splatter films, noting that they were "very important to me. The Italian spirit compels us to exaggerate."

Fragasso stated his first films with Mattei were The True Story of the Nun of Monza and The Other Hell, which were filmed simultaneously to save money. The two co-directed the films in a real convent and exchanged actors to allow them to shoot the two films simultaneously. While the films were being processed, Mattei and Fragasso were hired to finish the film Perverse Sex, Violent World which was completed in two weeks using stock footage. Their next film Hell of the Living Dead was written by Fragasso and his wife Rosella Drudi. Fragasso also assisted in directing the film. Mattei however maintained that on all the films Fragasso claims to have co-directed, he was really just Mattei's assistant director.

Following Hell of the Living Dead, producers suggested another two-film deal which led to Women's Prison Massacre and Violence in a Women's Prison, both starring Laura Gemser. Violence in a Women's Prison was written by Fragasso and Drudi. Fragasso spoke positively on working with Gemser, stating that "compared to the starlets of today, she was virtually a nun, the absolute opposite of a porn star". Gemser would years later work for producer Aristide Massaccesi's Filmirage team, as a costume designer on Fragasso's film Troll 2. Producer Roberto Di Girolamo requested a post-apocalyptic film from Fragasso and Mattei, called Rats: Night of Terror. Fragasso would also collaborate on the two Westerns Mattei directed in the 1980s: Scalps and White Apache. Fragasso also appeared in small roles in some of his films, such as Robowar and Cop Game.

In 1986, Fragasso made a film on his own without Mattei titled Monster Dog for producer Eduard Sarlui, starring musician Alice Cooper. Fragasso and Drudi also co-wrote the sequel to Lucio Fulci's Zombi 2, called Zombi 3. Director Fulci had to leave the Philippines set before completing the film, leading to Drudi and Fragasso having to re-write and expand the script in one day, the film's directing chores being completed by Bruno Mattei who was working in the Philippines at the time. Fragasso flew there the next day to assist Mattei with the filming.

While working on Zombi 3, Fragasso simultaneously directed another zombie film called After Death, written by himself and Drudi, which he described as "a small movie I did with half the budget of the "official" movie, which was shot in the same location in the Philippines" for Filmirage. After Death was shot at night since during the day, Fragasso was shooting Zombi 3 with Mattei. Fragasso also directed Beyond Darkness (La Casa 5) for Filmirage.

Fragasso has claimed that he and Drudi wrote the original story for Filmirage's Killing Birds which they wrote under the title Artigli, a claim dismissed by Italian film critic and historian Roberto Curti, who noted that the treatment for Killing Birds, that was written by Claudio Lattanzi and Bruna Antonucci, was much closer to the finished film.

Fragasso would later make Troll 2 for Massaccesi who wanted to make a horror film without any blood in it. The film was shot in mid-1989 in Morgan, Utah. Rosella met the producer Sarlui and he had a mask from the film Troll which Fragasso had not seen. Fragasso stated their film was originally to be titled Goblins and was written with Drudi as a more family-oriented horror film with humor about goblins who hated carnivorous humans as the goblins were vegetarians. Fragasso is credited as Drako Floyd, a pen name created by Drudi from the Dragon sign in the Chinese zodiac and for the band Pink Floyd.

=== 1990s and 2000s ===
In the mid-1990s, critics suggested there was a resurgence of crime films in Italy going on after the release of The Escort. This new wave included Fragasso's Palermo - Milan One Way, the box office success of which led to others such as Coppia omicida and the television film Operazione Odissea. Fragasso continued to make several films for both theatrical and television release, culminating in his 2007 sequel to Palermo - Milan One Way which was called Milano Palermo - il ritorno.

== Partial filmography ==
Note: The films listed as N/A are not necessarily chronological.

Title	Year	Credited as				Notes	Ref(s)
Title	Year	Director	Screenwriter	Screen story writer	Other	Notes	Ref(s)
Mania	1974				Yes	Assistant director	
Meet Him and Die	1976		Yes	Yes			
Gangbuster	1977		Yes				
La banda Vallanzasca	1977				Yes	Dialogue collaboration	
Don't Trust the Mafia	1979		Yes		Yes	Assistant director	
Il medium	1980		Yes				
The True Story of the Nun of Monza	1980		Yes				
Hell of the Living Dead	1980		Yes	Yes	Yes	assistant director	
The Other Hell	1981		Yes	Yes	Yes	assistant director	
The Seven Magnificent Gladiators	1983		Yes				
Rats: Night of Terror	1984		Yes				
Il piacere	1985		Yes	Yes			
Monster Dog	1986	Yes	Yes	Yes			
White Apache	1986				Yes	Assistant director	
Scalps	1986				Yes	Assistant director	
Double Target	1987		Yes	Yes			
Strike Commando	1987		Yes	Yes			
Zombi 3	1988		Yes	Yes			
Robowar	1988		Yes	Yes			
After Death	1989	Yes					
Night Killer	1990	Yes	Yes	Yes			
Troll 2	1990	Yes	Yes	Yes			
Beyond Darkness	1990	Yes	Yes	Yes		aka "La casa 5"	
Teste Rasate	1993	Yes					
Palermo – Milan One Way	1995	Yes	Yes				
Best Worst Movie	2009				Yes	himself	
Three for One	—N/a		Yes				
