= Strike Commando =

- Directed by: Bruno Mattei
- Written by: Rosella Drudi; Claudio Fragasso; Bruno Mattei
- Screenplay by: Claudio Fragasso
- Story by: Bruno Mattei; Claudio Fragasso
- Produced by: Oscar Faradyne
- Starring: Reb Brown; Christopher Connelly; Loes Kamma; Luciano Pigozzi
- Cinematography: Riccardo Grassetti
- Edited by: Bruno Mattei
- Music by: Luigi Ceccarelli
- Production company: Flora Film
- Distributed by: Variety Distribution
- Release date: October 1987 (United States)
- Running time: 104 minutes
- Country: Italy
- Language: English

Strike Commando is a 1987 Vietnam war action film directed by Bruno Mattei and starring Reb Brown, Christopher Connelly and Alex Vitale.

A sequel, Strike Commando II (Trappola diabolica), was released in 1988 and stars Brent Huff as Sgt. Michael Ransom.

== Plot ==
Sergeant Michael Ransom leads a covert operation into a Vietnamese military base to plant explosives. The mission fails after a sentry raises the alarm, and Colonel Radek orders the explosives detonated while the team is still retreating, resulting in casualties and Ransom being swept into a river. He is rescued by villagers, learns of a covert Soviet presence in Vietnam, and vows revenge while escorting the villagers to safety. During the journey, he faces multiple encounters with Viet Cong and Soviet forces. After discovering evidence of Soviet involvement, Ransom is captured and tortured but eventually escapes, killing his captors, including the Soviet officer Jakoda.

Upon returning to base, Ransom attempts to confront Radek for his role in the failed mission. When Radek disappears, Ransom tracks him to Manila, where he infiltrates his office building and kills him. In a final confrontation, Ransom defeats Jakoda, with only his metal teeth remaining.

== Cast ==
- Reb Brown as Michael Ransom
- Christopher Connelly as Colonel Radek
- Alex Vitale as Jakoda, The Main Antagonist of The Film
- Mike Monty as Major Harriman
- Luciano Pigozzi Le Due
- Louise Kamsteeg as Olga
- James Gaines as Radek's Soldier
- Edison Navarro as Lao
- Karen Lopez as Cho-Li

== Release ==
Strike Commando was distributed in October 1987 in the United States with a 102 minute running time. The film received a token theatrical release in Kansas City ahead of its home video release in the United States.

In 2021, the film was released on Blu-ray in the United States, along with its sequel, Strike Commando 2. It was distributed by Severin Films.

== Reception ==
The film was reviewed by a critic credited as "Lor." in Variety who reviewed the International Video Entertainment video cassette. "Lor." described the film as a "run-of-the-mill Italian war picture imitating Rambo." "Lor." went on to discuss "dumb dialog" and that the film was "at least a reel or two overlong, film has an idiotic, padded coda set about 15 years later in Manila." The review went on to note that "Some okay minor action scenes do not disguise the fact the film lacks the large-scale set pieces that have become de rigueur for Vietnam war pics."
