= Madness (1994 film) =

- Directed by: Bruno Mattei
- Screenplay by: Lorenzo De Luca
- Story by: Angelo Longoni; Lorenzo De Luca
- Produced by: Mimmo Scavia; Giovanni Paolucci
- Starring: Monica Carpanese; Gabriele Gori; Antonio Zequila
- Cinematography: Luigi Ciccarese
- Edited by: Bruno Mattei
- Production company: Europe Communications
- Release date: 1994
- Running time: 83 minutes
- Country: Italy

Madness (Italian: Gli occhi dentro a.k.a. Occhi senza volto) is a 1994 Italian giallo film directed by Bruno Mattei. The film is about Giovanna Dei (Monica Carpanese) who is the creator of the comic series Doctor Dark, a character with a split personality. After a series of murders begin to happen in a similar fashion to how Doctor Dark's fictional murders. Dei defends herself against any criticism of the violence in her comics and later finds that the murderer is leaving the eyeballs of her victims in her apartment.

Madness was a low budget production shot for foreign audiences. The version released to home video in Italy differs from the original film market screenings, where it borrows murder scenes from A Blade in the Dark. Only the English-dubbed version was released internationally under the title Madness; it was released in Italy as Gli occhi dentro. Film historians Roberto Curti and Troy Howarth commented negatively on the film on their retrospective reviews of the film.

== Cast ==
- Monica Carpanese as Giovanna Dei
- Gabriele Gori as Nico Manelli
- Emy Valentino as Emy
- Antonio Zequila as Amedeo Callistrati
- Achille Brugnini as Marzio Mannino
- Fausto Lombardi as Lorenzo Calligari

== Production ==
As with the film's director Bruno Mattei made in the early 1990s, Madness was a low-budget effort aimed primarily at foreign sales. Screenplay author Lorenzo De Luca stated the scenario and script were written in one week and that Mattei "left me plenty of room to do what I wanted, as long as the movie did not cost too much and there were not too many characters. I had lots of fun, although being a low-budget film, I was paid very little."

Madness was shot with the same film crew who had previously shot Mattei's erotic thriller Dangerous Attraction. The film's music is credited to Flipper music, which is library music as well as borrowing from film scores of films like Lady Frankenstein.

== Release ==
Madness was released in 1994 as Gli occhi dentro. The version released to home video in Italy had large portions of the film re-edited from its original screenings at film markets. This included taking two murder scenes from Lamberto Bava's film A Blade in the Dark (1983) which replace two murder scenes shot by Mattei. This version also loses scenes where a character finds the murder victims' eyes in an apartment and the epilogue with a coast guard boat approaching a yacht. The English-dubbed video was released internationally as Madness.

Madness was released on blu-ray in 2026 by Vinegar Syndrome as part of their box set Forgotten Gialli: Volume Nine (1991-1993).

== Reception ==
From retrospective reviews, Troy Howarth in his book on Italian giallo films opined that Madness's screenplay "contains seeds of promise, but the film is so poorly made and acted that it ends up making no impression whatsoever". Howarth also commented on the slow pacing, cinematography that was "flat and ugly", and actors who "overact like mad or are so wooden that they seem to disappear into the scenery."
