= Double Target =

- Directed by: Bruno Mattei
- Screenplay by: Claudio Fragasso; Bruno Mattei
- Story by: Claudio Fragasso; Bruno Mattei
- Produced by: Franco Gaudenzi
- Starring: Miles O'Keeffe; Donald Pleasence; Bo Svenson; Edison Navarro
- Cinematography: Riccardo Grassetti
- Edited by: Bruno Mattei
- Music by: Stefano Mainetti
- Production company: Flora Film
- Distributed by: Variety Distribution
- Release date: 11 June 1987 (West Germany)
- Country: Italy
- Languages: Italian; English

Double Target is a 1987 film directed by Bruno Mattei. The film was released theatrically in West Germany as Der Kampfgigant in 1987.

== Plot ==
The film starts with terrorists who attack American military bases in several Southeast Asian states. Ex-GI Bob Ross is smuggled into Vietnam by the CIA, where he is supposed to put the masterminds of the attacks out of action. In return, the secret service frees Bob's son who was born there from a re-education camp and brings him home to America. After heavy fighting with Viet Cong soldiers and Russian special forces, Ross also returns victorious to the United States.

== Release ==
Double Target was released theatrically in West Germany on June 11, 1987. It was later released in the United Kingdom on the home video label Avatar in August 1987 as Double Target.

== Reception ==
From contemporary reviews, the German film almanac Fischer Film Almanach stated that the film was another hybrid of the other bad Vietnam-themed films made after Rambo. In a retrospective review, Daniel R. Budnik wrote in his book on 1980s action films that Double Target is "entertaining but a little too long" and that the film "alternates between Sense and No Sense, the way many Mattei films do."
