= Carlo De Mejo =

Italian actor (1945–2015)

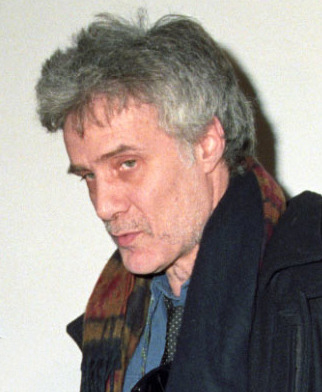
- De Mejo in February 1992
- Born: 17 January 1945; Rome, Italy
- Died: 18 December 2015 (aged 70); Rome, Italy
- Occupation: Actor
- Years active: 1968–2013
- Parent(s): Oscar De Mejo; Alida Valli

Carlo De Mejo (17 January 1945 – 18 December 2015) was an Italian actor.

== Life and career ==
Born in Rome, De Mejo was the eldest son of jazz composer Oscar De Mejo and actress Alida Valli. After a few minor roles, he had his breakout with the role of a male prostitute in Pier Paolo Pasolini's Teorema (1968). In 1970, he played Claude in Giuseppe Patroni Griffi and Victor Spinetti's Italian adaptation of the stage musical Hair. In the following years, he became very active as a character actor in genre films, especially Lucio Fulci's cult horror films.

== Selected filmography ==
- The Battle of Sinai (1968) - Ylan
- L'oro di Londra (1968) - Frankie
- Summit (1968)
- Teorema (1968) - Boy
- La colomba non deve volare (1970)
- Microscopic Liquid Subway to Oblivion (1970) - Billy
- Equinozio (1971)
- The Dead Are Alive (1972) - Igor Samarakis
- When Women Were Called Virgins (1972) - Gisippo
- The Outside Man (1972) - Karl
- Défense de savoir (1973)
- Stateline Motel (1973) - Albert
- The Net (1975) - Francesco Vanetti
- La sposina (1976) - Massimo Raimondi
- The Cassandra Crossing (1976) - Faux Patient (uncredited)
- A Simple Heart (1977)
- Porco mondo (1978) - Massimo
- Cindy's Love Games (1979) - Valerio
- Eros Perversion (1979) - Orsino
- Terror Express (1980) - Ernie
- Contamination (1980) - Agent Young
- City of the Living Dead (1980) - Gerry
- La locanda della maladolescenza (1980) - Andrea Poggi
- The Other Hell (1981) - Father Valerio
- The House by the Cemetery (1981) - Mr. Wheatley
- Manhattan Baby (1982) - Luke
- Emanuelle Escapes from Hell (1983)
- Al limite, cioè, non glielo dico (1984)
- À notre regrettable époux (1988) - Mercanton
- I fobici (1999) - A Party Guest (segment "Frutto Proibito")
- H.P. Lovecraft: Two Left Arms (2013) - Antonio Mezzanotte (final film role)
