= The Seven Magnificent Gladiators =

1983 film directed by Bruno Mattei

- U.S. theatrical poster
- Directed by: Bruno Mattei
- Screenplay by: Claudio Fragasso
- Produced by: Alexander Hacohen
- Starring: Lou Ferrigno; Brad Harris; Sybil Danning; Dan Vadis
- Cinematography: Silvano Ippoliti
- Edited by: Bruno Mattei
- Music by: Dov Seltzer
- Production company: Cannon Italia
- Release date: August 31, 1984 (U.S.)
- Running time: 83 minutes (U.S.)
- Countries: Italy; U.S.
- Languages: English; Italian
- Budget: US$1.5 million

The Seven Magnificent Gladiators (Italian: I sette magnifici gladiatori) is an Italian–American sword-and-sandal film directed by Bruno Mattei, and starring Lou Ferrigno, Brad Harris, Sybil Danning and Dan Vadis. In a story inspired by the classic Seven Samurai, Ferrigno plays a slave destined to overthrow a cruel king with the help of a motley crew of rogue fighters.

== Cast ==
- Lou Ferrigno as Han
- Sybil Danning as Julia
- Brad Harris as Scipio
- Dan Vadis as Nicerote
- Carla Ferrigno as Pandora
- Barbara Pesante as Anakora
- Yehuda Efroni as Emperor
- Mandy Rice-Davies as Lucilla
- Robert Mura as Vendrix
- Emilio Messina as Goliath
- Giovanni Cianfriglia as Festo
- Sal Borgese as Glafiro
- Françoise Perrot as Cornelia
- Antonella Giacomini as Diana
- Mary Rader as Lydia
- Giuseppe Mattei as Dex
- Gregg Logan as Dario
- Peter Rugge as Meorio
- Raul Cabrera as Army Captain
- John Growne II as Judas
- Laddy Price as Leper 1

== Production ==
=== Development ===
Lou Ferrigno was originally announced by Cannon as the star of a single Hercules film, to be directed by Bruno Mattei and produced by his regular associate Alexander Hacohen. However, the project was later split into two parts, both to be directed by Mattei, one of which would be called Hercules and the Seven Magnificent Gladiators. That picture was then transformed into a standalone adventure simply titled The Seven Magnificent Gladiators, and Ferrigno's character was renamed Han. Mattei promised "a grandiose return" to the glory days of the Italian peplum, and several veterans of the genre were brought back for the film, such as actors Brad Harris and Dan Vadis and cinematographer Silvano Ippoliti. Producer Alexander Hacohen cited local filmmakers' experience with the genre and ready-made locations, resulting in three times lower production costs, as the rationale for filming in Italy rather than in the U.S.

=== Filming ===
Principal photography lasted six weeks in late spring and early summer of 1982, shortly before Hercules. Mattei told the press that the film's cost were projected at ITL3 billion, or circa US$2.2 million at the time. However, Hacohen quoted a figure of ITL2 billion, or less than $1.5 million. Fragasso later complained of budget cuts on the part of Cannon honchos Menahem Golan and Yoram Globus, which resulted in the number of extras being pared down to unflattering levels. Contrary to the high fantasy look of Hercules, this film was more location-based. Ostia Antica and Paestum, both located on the Mediterranean coast, were featured. Various sites in Lazio were also visited, such as the Baths of Caracalla, Roman Forum, Circus of Maxentius and Via Appia Antica, as well as the natural waterfalls at Monte Gelato. Some interior filming did take place at De Paolis Studios in Rome.

According to Ferrigno, the relationship between the principal actors was competitive, as both Harris and Danning trained with him and aspired to emulate his commitment. Danning also learned swordfighting for this film. However, the actress accused Ferrigno of being insecure about sharing the spotlight with her, hogging the screen and even requiring one of her showcase scenes—a drinking contest with a tavern's male patrons—to be shot in his absence. Although Danning was brought back for Hercules as planned, these tensions supposedly led to her role in that film also being altered for the worse.

=== Post-production ===
The material delivered by Bruno Mattei was deemed unsatisfactory during dailies review, and the film's release was delayed. Before The Seven Magnificent Gladiators had even wrapped up, Cannon reached out to Luigi Cozzi to take over Hercules from Mattei, and to direct two weeks of reshoots to improve Gladiators. Eventually, Golan changed his mind. He decided to leave Mattei's version of Gladiators virtually untouched, and to use the additional material shot for it as the basis for a second Hercules film, The Adventures of Hercules (also known as Hercules II), which was released in 1985.

== Release ==
=== Pre-release ===
The poster used for many releases (including U.S. home video but not theatrical) was drawn by Keith Batcheller, who regularly worked for Cannon at the time. The film's international rights were acquired by Columbia Pictures.

=== Theatrical ===
In the U.S., The Seven Magnificent Gladiators opened on August 31, 1984, in a Southeast regional release from Cannon Releasing. The film was not a strong performer, and there is no indication that it expanded to other markets in the country. Although one publication states that it was shown in Italian cinemas sometime in 1983, no theatrical release certificate is recorded in the database operated by Italy's main film trade association.

=== Television ===
In the U.S., the film was shown on premium cable TV before it appeared on video, debuting on HBO on August 7, 1985.

=== Home media ===
In the U.S., the film was distributed on VHS and Betamax by MGM/UA Home Video in the run-up to Christmas 1985.

== Reception ==
The film was not screened for critics during its brief U.S. theatrical release. Since then, it has received generally negative reviews, albeit not as universally dismissive as those garnered by its sister film, Hercules.

Kim Newman of the Monthly Film Bulletin was scathing, and called the film "such an exact remake/rip-off of The Seven Samurai/The Magnificent Seven that the only possible surprise comes from the casting of Sybil Danning in the Brad Dexter role". He added that Bruno Mattei "seems totally at a loss when confronted with an action scene", singling out the "clumsy horsemanship of the participants in a noticeably unexciting chariot race, and the gauche weediness of the village girls and dotards [in the] final battle." VideoHound's Golden Movie Retriever was along the same lines, castigating a "[d]ismal effort at a remake of The Seven Samurai" and urging its readers to "see the original instead, please."

John Stanley, author of the Creature Features series of books, was more measured and found it to be "[e]ntertaining for its rousing sword battles and the performance of the provocative Danning, otherwise a ho-hum affair." HBO's Guide to Movies on Videocassette and Cable TV deemed that the film "offers plenty of action, but poor dubbing and special effects are obvious." Gary Smith, author of the book Epic Films, found that it "actually comes close to recapturing the spirit of the original films but lacks their naive charm." Austin Trunick, author of The Cannon Film Guide, declared the film "good fun" and "a rather worthy homage to the popular peplums of the 1960s". He also judged the grounded action more credible than the over-the-top fantasy of its successor Hercules, allowing the story to do "more than just link together splashy special effects scenes".

7 Magnificent Gladiators

Film score by Dov Seltzer
- Released: 12 October 2009
- Genre: Orchestral
- Length: 42:11
- Label: Intrada Records
- Producer: Douglass Fake (release producer)

Dov Seltzer chronology
The Megileh (1982)	7 Magnificent Gladiators (1983)	Mr. Leon (1983)

== Soundtrack ==
The film's original score was composed and conducted by Cannon regular Dov Seltzer. It received a limited CD release from Intrada Records as part of their Signature Edition line in 2009. A 9-minute suite from the score had previously been heard as part of a compilation album of Cannon scores released in 1993 by Silva Screen Records.

== See also ==
- Gladiators 7, a 1962 Spanish–Italian film based on the same concept
- List of Italian films of 1983
