= Kazuo Komizu =

Japanese film director

Kazuo "Gaira" Komizu
- Born: December 14, 1946 (age 79); Miyagi Prefecture, Japan
- Occupations: Film director and screenwriter
- Years active: 1968 – present

Kazuo Komizu (小水 一男, Komizu Kazuo; born December 14, 1946) is a Japanese film director from Miyagi Prefecture, mainly focusing on violent sex and gore films.

== Biography ==
He has a small following outside Japan thanks to a couple of notorious films:Entrails of a Beauty and Entrails of a Virgin. This type of film (low budget, yet high production values and shot on video), helped usher in a new era of extreme Asia movies. Komizu was the creator of the Japanese cult zombie film Battle Girl: The Living Dead in Tokyo Bay which was screened in 1991.

His nickname, "Gaira", apparently comes from a Japanese monster in the film War of the Gargantuas (フランケンシュタインの怪獣 サンダ対ガイラ, Furankenshutain no kaijū: Sanda tai Gaira) (1966).

== Filmography ==
- Seiyugi (1968)
- Go, Go Second Time Virgin (1969) (writing)
- Seizoku (1970)
- Sailor-fuku shikijo shiiku (1982)
- Hako no naka no onna: shojo ikenie (1985)
- Bijo no harawata (1986)
- Shojo no harawata (1986)
- Ryôjoku mesu ichiba – kankin (1986)
- Guzoo The Thing Forsaken By God Part I (1986)
- Gômon kifujin (1987)
- Hoshi tsugu mono (1990)
- Batoru garu (1992)
- XX: utsukushiki kyôki (1993)
- Gokudo no ane Reiko (1995)

== Bibliography ==
- Hamamoto, Maki. "Entrails of Kazuo Komizu" (interview), in Asian Cult Cinema, #45.
