= Women's Prison Massacre =

- Directed by: Bruno Mattei
- Screenplay by: Claudio Fragasso; Olivier Lefait
- Story by: Claudio Fragasso; Olivier Lefait
- Starring: Laura Gemser; Gabriele Tinti; Ursula Flores; Maria Romano
- Cinematography: Luigi Ciccarese
- Edited by: Gilbert Kikoine
- Music by: Luigi Ceccarelli
- Production companies: Beatrice Films; Films du Chevain, Paris
- Distributed by: Indipendenti Regionali
- Release date: 1983
- Countries: France; Italy

Women's Prison Massacre (Italian: Blade Violent) is a 1983 film directed by Bruno Mattei and starring Laura Gemser, Gabriele Tinti, Carlo De Mejo, Lorraine De Selle, and Franca Stoppi.

== Plot ==
Emanuelle (Laura Gemser) is sent to a violent women's prison. While she is in prison, she comes into confrontation with the "top dog" inmate Albina (Ursula Flores), ending in a series of fights. Albina gets the worse of it, including a broken arm, a knife in her leg, and her wig pulled off. Following a series of cat fights and arguments, the women's lives are interrupted by the arrival of four male death row inmates led by "Crazy Boy" Henderson (Gabriele Tinti), who break into the prison. The male convicts proceed to rape, mutilate and torture the female inmates (involving a sick game of Russian roulette) and executions. One convict is killed when a SWAT team attempts to invade the prison. Another is killed by a female inmate who hides a razor blade inside her vagina before enticing him to have his way with her. Henderson and the remaining male cons attempt to break out using the warden (Lorraine De Selle), Emanuelle and a wounded sheriff as human shields. After a gory finale, Emanuelle and the sheriff (Carlo De Mejo) are the only characters left alive and the sheriff promises to reopen her case.

== Cast ==
- Laura Gemser as Emanuelle
- Gabriele Tinti as "Crazy Boy" Henderson
- Ursula Flores as Albina
- María Romano as Laura
- Antonella Giacomini as Irene
- Raul Cabrera as Victor "Geronimo" Brain
- Pierangelo Pozzato as Helmut "Blade" Von Bauer
- Robert Mura as Brett O'Hara
- Michael Laurant as Prison Official
- Françoise Perrot as Molly, The Guard
- Franca Stoppi as Head Guard
- Jacques Stany as District Attorney Robinson
- Carlo De Mejo as Lawman Harrison
- Lorraine De Selle as Warden Colleen

== Production ==
The French funding for the film was provided by an undergarments company which is worn by the female cast during the film. The liner notes for the Women's Prison Massacre DVD release state "Mattei, using the moniker Gilbert Roussel, shot Women's Prison Massacre back-to-back with his Violence in a Women's Prison. It has basically the same cast, but both films are completely different."

== Release ==
Women's Prison Massacre was released in 1983.

On December 8, 2015, Shout! Factory released this film on Blu-Ray under the title Women's Prison Massacre. The film has been released under the titles Révolte au pénitencier de filles in France and I violenti in Italy. The film has also been released under the titles Emmanuelle in Prison and Emmanuelle Escapes from Hell.

== Review ==
AllMovie reviewed the film saying: "For even the most jaded fans of the genre, Women's Prison Massacre is as entertaining and arousing as (an) autopsy footage. As unpleasant as it is, though, the film doesn't begin to approach the depths reached by Mattei's previous effort (Violence in a Women's Prison (1982)) which features the same cast, crew, and basic plot."
