= Entrails of a Virgin =

- Theatrical release poster
- Directed by: Kazuo Komizu
- Produced by: Hiroshi Hanzawa; Toshio Satō
- Starring: Saiko Kizuki; Naomi Hagio
- Cinematography: Akihiro Itō
- Edited by: Kan Suzuki
- Music by: Hideki Furusawa
- Production company: June Theater
- Distributed by: Nikkatsu; Rokugatsu Gekijō; Synapse Films (NTSC); Japan Shock (PAL)
- Release date: May 31, 1986 (Japan)
- Running time: 72 minutes
- Country: Japan
- Language: Japanese

Entrails of a Virgin (Japanese: 処女のはらわた, Hepburn: Shojo no harawata) is a 1986 Japanese horror film in the "splatter-eros" subgenre of pink film. Most of the sex scenes are fogged, due to censorship in Japan.

== Plot ==
A group of photographers and their models go to a forest retreat. They engage in S&M play and much softcore sex. Eventually they get picked off one-by-one by a filth-covered "demon" with an unnaturally large penis.

In the end, all the film crews perish and only the main actress, Rei, survives. Nevertheless, she becomes heavily pregnant with the demon’s child. Rei looks over the sea and wonders what will come out of her womb. She decides that she is actually looking forward to see it just before the surrounding rock formations around her bust into flame.

== Cast ==
- Saeko Kizuki as Rei
- Naomi Hagio as Kazuyo
- Megumi Kawashima as Kei
- Osamu Tsuruoka as Itomura
- Daiki Katô as Asaoka
- Hideki Takahashi as Tachikawa
- Kazuhiko Goda as murderer

== Production ==
During the 1980s, slasher film-makers had begun adding increasing amounts of sexuality into their movies. Working in the pink film genre, director Kazuo "Gaira" Komizu decided to inject elements of horror into these softcore pornographic productions. The film became a box-office success.

== Release ==
Along with its sequel, Entrails of a Beautiful Woman, Entrails of a Virgin became a notorious example of the low-quality blackmarket VHS copies which American enthusiasts traded in the 1980s. These copies usually had no English subtitles. The film was released on DVD first on the Japan Shock label in PAL format, and then by Synapse Films in NTSC. The Synapse release was a restored, widescreen version.

== Critical reception ==
In his Asia Shock; Horror and Dark Cinema from Japan, Korea, Hong Kong, and Thailand, Patrick Galloway says that Komizu's mix of sex and horror works as a film. He describes the film as "essentially one long fuck-fest interspersed with the occasional impaling, hanging or beheading..." and concludes: "It's all rather sordid and there's a definite misanthropy to the film reminiscent of Henri-Georges Clouzot (Diabolique), but somehow the elements click into place, making for an uncomfortable-yet-can't-look-away film experience".

== Sequel ==
One of a series of three by director Kazuo "Gaira" Komizu, the other two were the considerably more graphic and hardcore Entrails of a Beautiful Woman (1986), as well as Female Inquisitor (1987).

== Bibliography ==
- Galloway, Patrick (2006). Asia Shock; Horror and Dark Cinema from Japan, Korea, Hong Kong, and Thailand. Berkeley, CA: Stone Bridge Press. p. 80. ISBN 1-933330-12-0.
- Johnson, David (July 30, 2004). "Entrails Of A Virgin (DVD review)". dvdverdict.com.
- McCrae, Scooter (October 2004). "DVD Dungeon". Fangoria. No. 237. p. 54.
- "処女のはらわた (Shoujo no harawata)" (in Japanese). Japanese Movie Database.
- Thompson, Nathaniel (2006). DVD Delirium 3: The International Guide to Weird and Wonderful Films on DVD. U.K.: FAB Press. pp. 191–192. ISBN 1-903254-40-X.
- Weisser, Thomas; Yuko Mihara Weisser (1998). Japanese Cinema Encyclopedia: The Sex Films. Miami: Vital Books: Asian Cult Cinema Publications. pp. 126–127. ISBN 1-889288-52-7.
