= Rats: Night of Terror =

- Directed by: Bruno Mattei
- Screenplay by: Claudio Fragasso; Bruno Mattei
- Story by: Bruno Mattei
- Starring: Ottaviano Dell'Acqua; Geretta Geretta; Massimo Vanni; Gianni Franco
- Cinematography: Franco Delli Colli
- Music by: Luigi Ceccarelli
- Production companies: Beatrice Film; IMP.EX.CI.
- Release dates: 1984 (Italy); 5 December 1984 (Paris)
- Running time: 97 minutes
- Countries: Italy; France

Rats: Night of Terror (Italian: Rats - Notte di terrore) is a 1984 post-apocalyptic horror film directed by Bruno Mattei about a biker-gang that find themselves trapped in an abandoned research lab fighting for their lives against hordes of bloodthirsty killer rats.

== Plot ==
Set 225 years after a nuclear holocaust in 2015 in the modern day, the survivors are divided between those who live in comfortable underground cities and the "New Primitives" who live in the sunlight. A group of 11 of these people come across a mysterious, abandoned village. Despite the presence of numerous horribly mutilated corpses, the adventurers decide to settle in town after discovering a large amount of food, a greenhouse with various fruit trees and a reservoir of drinking water. The following night hundreds and hundreds of hungry genetically mutated rats are ready to attack them one by one.

Lucifer and Lilith are making love and expelled by the group for being too loud. After an argument, Lucifer becomes intoxicated and is attacked and knocked into the sewer where he is devoured. At the same time a sleeping Lilith is attacked and eaten from the inside. A rat later emerges from her mouth when her corpse is found - as this happens Noah appears after also being attacked and the leader of the gang, Kurt is forced to kill him with a flamethrower.

The group decide to barricade themselves inside until dawn and, as they do, Diana is attacked and is bitten multiple times, making her ill. Chocolate tends to Diana and tells the group she needs her bite wounds treated or they will become infected. The men decide to go fetch medicine and water while the women keep an eye on Diana, but Duke refuses to help anyone and stays in safety.

Tarus is the next killed as the survivors attempt to escape the basement, as he falls down the stairs and is devoured. Duke loses his mind and challenges Kurt for leadership, but nobody supports him. He takes Myrna prisoner and attempts to escape but once at the group's vehicles he is attacked and killed when he drops a grenade which also kills Myrna. After seeing this Diana retreats and commits suicide by slashing her wrists and her partially eaten body is found by the four remaining survivors. They again retreat and find a recording of a distressed man warning anyone who finds the town that the rats will kill them like they have his friends.

The survivors are once again attacked by the relentless rats and Deus and Kurt sacrifice themselves to barricade the door to allow Video and Chocolate to escape outside where teams in hazmat suits appear from the sewers, gas all the rats and save the pair. The duo correctly discern the team are from Delta-2, a sector of underground dwellers who were said to aid those above ground. As the survivors thank their saviors and remark they are all friends because they are of the same human race, the leader of the rescue team removes his mask; revealing himself to be a humanoid rat.

== Cast ==
- Ottaviano Dell'Acqua as Kurt
- Geretta Geretta as Chocolate
- Massimo Vanni as Taurus
- Gianni Franco as Video
- Ann-Gisel Glass as Myrna
- Cindy Leadbetter as Diana
- Henry Luciani as Duke
- Fausto Lombardi as Deus (as Tony Lombardo)
- Jean-Christophe Brétigniere as Lucifer (as Christoph Bretner)
- Moune Duvivier as Lilith
- Christian Fremont as Noah (as Chris Fremont)

== Production ==
Rats: Night of Terror used some of the sets from Sergio Leone's film Once Upon a Time in America. Geretta Geretta took the role after her roommate Dale Wyatt was offered it. Geretta recalled that it was her second film she made in Italy. As she did not speak Italian, Geretta translated her script with a pocket dictionary.

When asked if Claudio Fragasso directed anything of the film, Geretta replied "Hell no" and that "I hear the same crap regarding Dario and Lamberto when we were all on Demons - is that really talented people like Bruno, allow other people to have opinions, chime in, come up with stuff. But Rats is Bruno's film." Geretta continued that Fragasso "had lots of good ideas and Bruno would sort of pull on his chin in silence then if he liked it he'd say "Va bene" and plenty of times he did not say "Va bene"."

== Release ==
Rats: Night of Terror was released in Italy in 1984. It was released in Paris on 5 December 1984. While both the Italian and Paris releases ran at 90 minutes, a theatrical screening in Germany in 1984 ran at 97 minutes.

It was released in Ontario, Canada with a Restricted rating, after it had been previously submitted and rejected twice.

Rats was released on DVD by Anchor Bay, in their 2005 Fright Pack. It was later re-released by Blue Underground in 2007.

== Critical reception ==
Robert Firsching of AllMovie said that the film was on the whole "workmanlike," with Fragasso and Mattei adding in enough surprises to keep audiences engaged. He commented that it was one of Mattei's more watchable works.
