= Scalps (1987 film) =

- Directed by: Bruno Mattei
- Screenplay by: Richard Harrison; Bruno Mattei
- Story by: Richard Harrison
- Starring: Vassili Karis; Mapi Galán; Alberto Farnese; Ramon Carlos Miron Bravo; Francisco Gomez Castro; Emilio Linder; Ignacio M. Carreno
- Music by: Luigi Ceccarelli
- Release date: 1987
- Country: Italy
- Language: Italian

Scalps is a 1987 Spaghetti Western directed by Bruno Mattei.

== Plot ==
A defeated Confederate colonel lusts after Yarin, the daughter of an Indian chief, and tries to buy her from her father. When he refuses to sell her, the Confederates massacre the Indians and kidnap her. She escapes, and with the aid of a rancher, a former member of the Confederate unit, evades recapture and takes her revenge.
