= Bruno Mattei =

Italian film director, screenwriter and editor

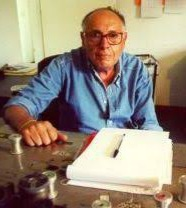
- Born: Bruno Mattei; 30 July 1931; Rome, Italy
- Died: 21 May 2007 (aged 75); Rome, Italy
- Occupations: Filmmaker; film editor
- Years active: 1956–2007

Bruno Mattei (30 July 1931 – 21 May 2007) was an Italian filmmaker and film editor who directed exploitation films in many genres, including women in prison, nunsploitation, zombie, mondo, cannibal, and Nazisploitation films. Mattei's films often followed popular genre trends of the era. Mattei continued work as a director primarily in the Philippines until his death in 2007, just before he was to enter production on his fifth Zombie film.

== Biography ==
Bruno Mattei was born on 30 July 1931 in Rome, Italy. Mattei grew up around films as his father owned a film editing studio. He studied at the Centro Sperimentale Centrale, the national film school, and graduated in 1951. Mattei initially worked as a screenwriter and claimed to have worked on over 100 films as an editor, a claim that film historian Louis Paul stated was "difficult to verify". Some of the earliest films Mattei worked on included Lulu and Tua per la vita. Early film work started in 1956 on Giovanni dalle Bande Nere, after which Mattei worked on several peplum and Eurospy films.

His first film as a director was Armida, il Dramma di Una Sposa (1970), after which he directed Cuginetta...Amore Mio!, a sexploitation film starring Rita De Simone. Then followed his Nazi-themed exploitation films such as SS Girls (1977) and KZ9 Lager di Sterminio, some mondo documentary films starring Laura Gemser, Le Notti Porno nel Mondo and Emanuelle le Porno Notti del Mondo N. 2, and nunsploitation films such as The True Story of the Nun of Monza and The Other Hell.

Mattei continued working in various other exploitation-themed genres in the 1980s such as zombie films, sex films, peplums, and Vietnam War-themed productions. In 1982, Mattei filmed two "women in prison" films, Women's Prison Massacre and Violence in a Women's Prison. The liner notes for the Women's Prison Massacre DVD release state, "Mattei, using the moniker Gilbert Roussel, shot Women's Prison Massacre back-to-back with his Violence in a Women's Prison. It has basically the same cast, but both films are completely different."

In 1980, Mattei began collaborating with screenwriter Claudio Fragasso, beginning with The True Story of the Nun of Monza (1980) and ending with a comedy called Three For One (1990). The two worked closely together for that ten-year period (collaborating on 15 films), with Fragasso occasionally assuming the role of second unit director.

Mattei was initially attached to direct an adaptation of Hercules from a screenplay by Ricardo Ghione. Principal photography was scheduled to begin May 1982 in Rome, Italy while The Hollywood Reporter naming Fragasso as screenwriter, and Ennio Morricone as music composer and conductor. Neither Mattei, Fragasso, or Morricone appear in onscreen credits. The Hollywood Reporter later stated that principal photography on Hercules began in August 1982 in Italy under the direction of Luigi Cozzi. Mattei later directed Lou Ferrigno in The Seven Magnificent Gladiators.)

Mattei replaced Lucio Fulci as the director of Zombi 3 in the Philippines after Fulci left the project unfinished, then co-produced Zombie 4: After Death immediately afterwards with Fragasso in the director's chair, using the same sets and some of the same cast members. Mattei's other late-1980s films included Robowar and Shocking Dark - Terminator II (which incorporated elements of other popular science fiction films of the time such as The Terminator and Alien). As the 1980s ended, most of Mattei's work was released direct to video or to Italian television, such as his Appuntamento a Trieste, a 1987 6-hour-long Italian TV mini-series. Many of Mattei's films from the 1990s became harder to find as export releases or home video releases.

From 1993 onward, Mattei worked as a director almost exclusively for Italian producer Giovanni Paolucci, a working arrangement that jump-started Mattei's career after he and Fragasso had gone their own ways in 1990. Paolucci produced most of Mattei's later films, beginning with Dangerous Attraction and ending with Mattei's final film, Zombies: The Beginning. Mattei continued directing films right up until his death. Mattei died in Rome, Italy, in a hospital after complications from brain tumour surgery on May 21, 2007, at age 75.

He is survived by a son, Dario Mattei.

== Style ==
Jason Buchanan described Bruno Mattei's films as "low budget, gore-drenched efforts" and that "B-movie lovers can argue his importance in the realm of film until the world ends, few will deny that his films rarely fail to entertain on terms of sleaze and gratuitous violence alone -- if that's your kind of thing".

Louis Paul, in his analysis of Italian horror film directors, stated that Mattei's career consisted of him being a "director of copy-cat movies. Whenever a film or a genre became popular, he directed his own (unsanctioned) remake or unofficial sequel." Daniel Budnik, an author of a book on 1980s action films, described Mattei as "no stranger to simply ripping stuff off", noting his use of Goblin's music for Hell of the Living Dead, stock footage from documentaries on South African tribes, and shark attack footage for his Cruel Jaws, ultimately describing him as "the best of all possible rip-off artists [...] Bruno just really did his own thing and went his own way" which involved "ripping everyone off, but you can't have everything".

Mattei used several aliases throughout his career, including Jordan B. Matthews, Jimmy Matheus, Gilbert Roussel, Axel Berger, Michael Cardoso, David Hunt, Werner Knox, Pierre Le Blanc, Stefan Oblowsky, and most famously Vincent Dawn.

== Selected filmography ==
Note: The films listed as N/A are not necessarily chronological.

Title	Year	Credited as				Notes	Ref(s)
Title	Year	Director	Writer	Editor	Other	Notes	Ref(s)
The Pirate of the Black Hawk	1958				Yes	Assistant film editor	
The Mighty Crusaders	—N/a				Yes	Assistant film editor	
The Loves of Salammbo	1960				Yes	Assistant film editor	
Sexy	1962			Yes			
Caesar Against the Pirates	1962				Yes	Sound mixer	
Fire Monsters Against the Son of Hercules	1962				Yes	Sound editor	
Triumph of the Ten Gladiators	1964				Yes	Assistant film editor	
Spartacus and the Ten Gladiators	1964			Yes			
Agent 3S3: Passport to Hell	1965			Yes			
Misión en Ginebra	1967			Yes			
Goldface, the Fantastic Superman	1967			Yes			
The Magnificent Tony Carrera	1968			Yes			
Die Nichten der Frau Oberst	1968			Yes			
99 Women	1969			Yes			
Yellow: le cugine	1969			Yes			
Count Dracula	1970			Yes			
Armida, il Dramma di Una Sposa	—N/a	Yes					
Emanuelle's Revenge	1975	Yes	Yes			uncredited co-director	
Cuginetta, amore mio!	—N/a	Yes	Yes				
SS Girls	1977	Yes	Yes				
Women's Camp 119	1977	Yes	Yes				
Sexy Night Report	—N/a	Yes	Yes				
Emanuelle e le Porno Notti nel Mondo N.2	1978	Yes					
Cicciolina amore mio	—N/a	Yes					
Sexual Aberration: Sesso Perverso	—N/a	Yes					
Sesso perverso, mondo violento	1980	Yes					
La provinciale a lezione di sesso	1980	Yes					
The True Story of the Nun of Monza	1980	Yes					
Hell of the Living Dead	1980	Yes					
The Other Hell	1981	Yes	Yes				
Caligula and Messalina	1981	Yes	Yes	Yes			
Nero and Poppea - An Orgy of Power	1982	Yes					
Violence in a Women's Prison	1982	Yes					
Women's Prison Massacre	1983	Yes					
The Seven Magnificent Gladiators	1983	Yes		Yes			
Rats: Night of Terror	1984	Yes		Yes			
Hanna D. - The Girl from Vondel Park	1984	Yes			Yes	co-director	
White Apache	1986	Yes	Yes				
Scalps	1987	Yes	Yes				
Strike Commando	1987	Yes	Yes				
Double Target	1987	Yes	Yes				
Zombi 3	1988	Yes			Yes		
Appointment in Trieste	—N/a	Yes				Made for television	
Strike Commando 2	—N/a	Yes					
Robowar	—N/a	Yes					
Cop Game	—N/a	Yes					
After Death	1989				Yes	As co-producer	
Born to Fight	1989	Yes				co-directed with Claudio Fragasso	
Shocking Dark - Terminator II	1989	Yes					
Desire	—N/a	Yes					
Three For One	—N/a	Yes					
Dangerous Attraction	—N/a	Yes	Yes				
Madness	1994	Yes	Yes	Yes			
Omicidio al telefono	—N/a	Yes	Yes	Yes			
Legitimate Vendetta	—N/a	Yes	Yes				
Cruel Jaws	1995	Yes	Yes	Yes			
Ljuba: Body and Soul	—N/a	Yes					
A Respectable Judge	—N/a	Yes					
Belle da morire: Killing Striptease	—N/a	Yes					
The Other Woman	—N/a	Yes					
Venetian Caprice	—N/a	Yes					
Snuff Trap	—N/a	Yes					
Mondo Cannibale: Cannibal World	—N/a	Yes					
In the Land of the Cannibals	—N/a	Yes					
The Tomb	2004	Yes	Yes				
Killing Striptease II	—N/a	Yes					
A Shudder on the Skin	—N/a	Yes					
Secrets of a Woman	—N/a	Yes					
Secrets of a Woman II	—N/a	Yes					
Orient Escape	—N/a	Yes					
The Jail: The Women's Hell	—N/a	Yes	Yes				
Island of the Living Dead	2006	Yes	Yes				
Zombies: The Beginning	2007	Yes	Yes				
