= Rock Music Awards =

American music award

The Rock Music Awards was an annual awards ceremony showcasing the best in rock music that was held from 1975 to 1978.

During the mid-1970s, the only genre-specific musical awards ceremonies were for country music (where the Nashville-based Country Music Association, West Coast-oriented Academy of Country Music and short-lived Association of Country Entertainers all had competing awards ceremonies at the time). Up to this point, rock music, in its various forms, had been the dominant form of American popular music since overtaking doo-wop in the 1950s; as such, rock songs dominated general music awards such as the Grammy Awards and American Music Awards. By the mid-1970s, however, disco began a rise to mainstream popularity, pushing rock into a niche. The Rock Music Awards were conceived as a way to continue to recognize rock music that was not being recognized due to the rise of disco.

The Rock Music Awards was not able to establish a long-term presence, and the ceremony was not reprised after the third edition.

== History ==
The first annual awards program was produced and by CBS on August 9, 1975 partially sponsored by Coca-cola in Los Angeles by Don Kirshner and featured Elton John and Diana Ross as hosts and presenters. Winners of the 1975 awards included Elton John as 'Rock Personality of the Year' and The Who's Tommy as 'Rock Movie of the Year.' Linda Ronstadt was awarded the 'Best Rock Female Vocalist' honor, which she would also win the next two years after that. Other winners included The Eagles, Stevie Wonder and Bad Company.

The Second Annual awards show featured Diana Ross and Alice Cooper as hosts and presenters.

The Third Annual awards show featured Olivia Newton-John, pre-Grease, and Peter Frampton at the height of his fame as hosts and presenters.

== 1975 ==
Here is a list of winners of the 1975 Rock Music Awards:

Outstanding rock personality of the year: Elton John

Best album: “Blood on the Tracks,” Bob Dylan

Best single record “You're No Good,” Linda Ronstadt

Best male vocalist: Stevie Wonder

Best female vocalist: Joni Mitchell

Best group: Eagles

Best new male vocalist: Dan Fogelberg

Best new female vocalist: Phoebe Snow

Best new group: Bad Company

Best rhythm and blues single: “Lady Marmalade,” Labelle

Best rhythm and blues album: “That's the Way of the World,” Earth, Wind and Fire
