= Violence in a Women's Prison =

- Theatrical poster
- Italian: Violenza in un carcere femminile
- Directed by: Bruno Mattei
- Screenplay by: Palmanbrogio Molteni; Oliver Lefait
- Story by: Palmanbrogio Molteni
- Starring: Laura Gemser; Gabriele Tinti; Maria Romano
- Cinematography: Luigi Ciccarese
- Edited by: Bruno Mattei
- Music by: Luigi Ceccarelli
- Production companies: Beatrice Film; Films Jacques Leitienne
- Distributed by: Indipendenti Regionali
- Running time: 97 minutes
- Countries: Italy; France
- Language: Italian

Violence in a Women's Prison (Italian: Violenza in un carcere femminile) is a 1982 women in prison film directed by Bruno Mattei. The film stars Laura Gemser and Gabriele Tinti. It tells the story of Emanuelle, who is sent to Santa Catarina Women's Penitentiary for drugs and prostitution, where she meets the warden and the other inmates. Her actual reason is undercover reporting for Amnesty International. It is the seventh film in the Emanuelle nera film series and the first one directed by Mattei.

== Plot ==
Under a false identity, journalist Emanuelle pretends to be a drug dealer to get herself sent to prison in order to investigate and document the brutality and abuses that inmates are subjected to. While there she is attacked, locked in solitary confinement, and injured. Emanuelle is helped by Dr. Moran and some prisoners, and is able to report her findings, after which the perpetrators are arrested.

== Cast ==
- Laura Gemser as Emanuelle Sterman / Laura Kendall
- Gabriele Tinti as Dr. Moran
- Maria Romano as Kitty
- Ursula Flores as Consuelo
- Antonella Giacomini as Malone
- Franco Caracciolo as Leander
- Françoise Perrot as Hertha
- Lorraine De Selle as Head Warden
- Jacques Stany as Chief Inspector
- Leila Durante as Pilar
- Franca Stoppi as Rescaut
- Raul Cabrera as Miguel

== Production ==
Director Bruno Mattei is credited as Vincent Dawn or Gilbert Roussel in some prints.

== Release ==
Violence in a Women's Prison was released in 1982. It was released as Caged Women in the United States in April 1984. The film also has the alternative title Women's Penitentiary 4.

== Critical response ==
Allmovie gave the film a rating of one star out of five, noting that "Mattei doesn't skimp on the nastiness, presenting a three-way catfight on a floor full of feces, Gemser nibbled by rats in solitary confinement, a homosexual who is sodomized to death after his straight cellmates are aroused by a striptease, and various rapes, tortures, and vomit scenes."

== Home media ==
The DVD was first released by Shriek Show for Region 1 in December 2002. The all-region Blu-ray was released by Severin Films in May 2018.
