= Severin Films =

American film production and distribution company

- Company logo, not based on a real actress.
- Industry: Home video
- Founded: 2006; 20 years ago
- Headquarters: Los Angeles, California, U.S.
- Key people: Carl Daft; David Gregory; John Cregan
- Products: DVD; Blu-ray; Ultra HD Blu-ray
- Website: severinfilms.com

Severin Films is an American independent film production and distribution company known for restoring and releasing cult films on DVD, Blu-ray and Ultra HD Blu-ray. It is considered a boutique Blu-ray and DVD label.

== History ==
Severin Films was created in 2006 by the same core team that had built up the similar Blue Underground label.

It is headquartered in Los Angeles with offices in the U.K., where some of its founders come from. It previously had additional offices in New York. Like its predecessor, the company's name was inspired by The Velvet Underground. Severin was the protagonist of the novel Venus in Furs, which had been made into a song by the band.

It also inspired the U.S title of a film made by one of their go-to directors, Jess Franco, which they had reissued at Blue Underground.

Severin has also branched out into books, and hosts an annual summer festival in Los Angeles.

== Filmography ==
Severin Films' releases includes Enzo G. Castellari's The Inglorious Bastards (1978), Walerian Borowczyk's Immoral Women (1979), Dennis Hopper's Out of the Blue (1980), Jesús Franco's Bloody Moon (1981) and Macumba Sexual (1981), Gwendoline: Unrated Director's Cut (1984), Shocking Dark (1989), Hardware (1990), and The Hairdresser's Husband (1990).

Others include distributing Birdemic: Shock and Terror (2008), Mancunian Man: The Legendary Life of Cliff Twemlow (2023), and a new 2025 4K UHD release of the Ben Wheatley directed British psychological crime horror Kill List (2011).

== Russ Meyer deal ==
In September 2024, Severin Films reached a deal with the Russ Meyer Trust to release restored editions of several of his films, beginning with Vixen!, Supervixens and Beneath the Valley of the Ultra-Vixens, which were scheduled for release on January 28, 2025.

== 2026 releases ==
In April 2026, Rue Morgue reported that Severin Films announced the seven‑disc set Sangster Directs Hammer and the documentary Children of the Wicker Man for release on June 30, including North American UHD premieres of several Hammer titles. In May 2026, the company announced UHD released of anti-nuclear war films The War Game and Threads, as well as a Blu-Ray release of the documentary A Year in a Field.
