= Mary Stävin =

Swedish actress, model, and beauty queen (born 1957)

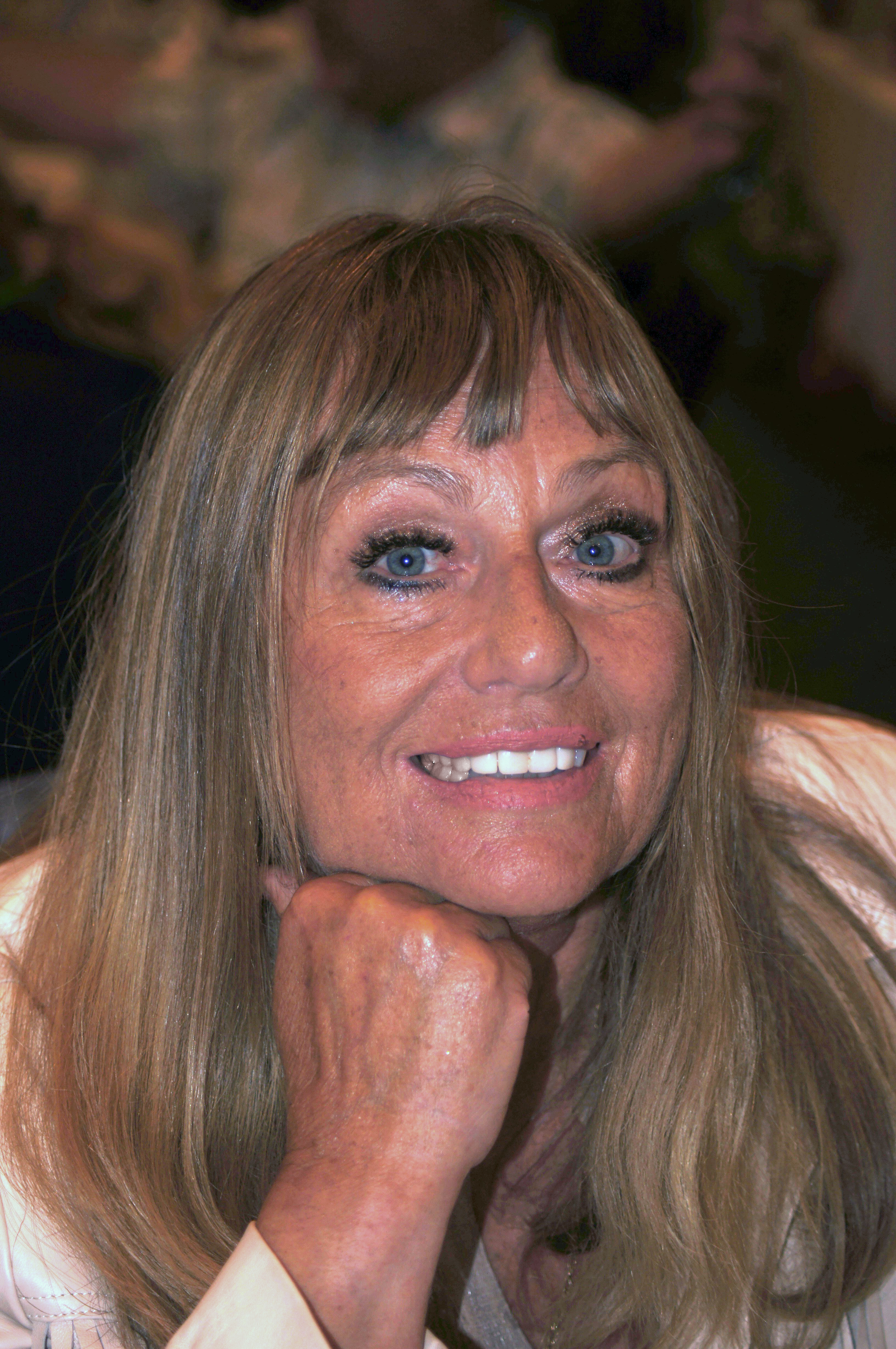
- Stävin in 2023
- Born: 20 August 1957 (age 69); Örebro County, Sweden
- Occupation: Actress
- Height: 170 cm (5 ft 7 in)
- Spouse: Nicholas Wilcockson (m. 1995)
- Children: 1
- Beauty pageant titleholder
- Title: Miss World Sweden 1977; Miss World 1977
- Years active: 1981–present
- Hair color: Blonde
- Eye color: Blue

Mary Ann-Catrin Stävin (born 20 August 1957) is a Swedish actress, model and beauty queen. She won Miss World 1977 and appeared in the James Bond films Octopussy (1983) and A View to a Kill (1985). She is the third Swedish to win the Miss World title, after back-to-back wins in 1951 and 1952. She was crowned by Miss World 1976, Carole Crawford from Jamaica. And crowned her successor Silvana Suárez of Argentina in Miss World 1978 on 16 November 1978.

== Early life ==
Stävin was born in Örebro County, Sweden, in 1957. A blue-eyed blonde, she won Miss World 1977 in London, becoming the third Swedish woman to win the Miss World crown.

Stävin started her acting career in the early 1980s. She appeared in two music videos for Adam Ant, "Ant Rap" (1981) and "Strip" (1983).

Stävin's first film role was in the James Bond film Octopussy (1983), where she played a non-speaking role as an Octopussy girl. She then appeared in the next Bond film, A View to a Kill (1985), in a larger role as agent Kimberley Jones. Bond actor Roger Moore later wrote in his autobiography that "floating away on board a submarine with Mary Stavin must be many men's dream."

Stävin dated footballer Don Shanks from 1978 to 1982. She then dated footballer George Best from 1982 to 1985, and the couple released the exercise album Shape Up and Dance.

== Film star ==
Stävin continued her acting career after the Bond films. She had supporting roles in the horror films House (1985) and Open House (1987). She then had supporting roles in the films The Opponent (1988), Alien Terminator (1988), and Howling V: The Rebirth (1989).

Stävin played the female lead in the action films Strike Commando 2 (1988) and Born to Fight (1989). Both were directed by Bruno Mattei and starred Brent Huff. Stävin also played Heba in the television series Twin Peaks (1990).

During the late 1980s, Stävin was married to and divorced from actor Steve Jamieson, and she then had a five-year relationship with actor William Holdsworth.

== Later life ==
Stävin has acted sporadically since the mid-1990s. She married businessman Nicholas Wilcockson in 1995, and the couple has one daughter who was born in 1996. Stävin lives in California.

== Filmography ==
=== Film ===
Year	Title	Role	Notes
1983	Octopussy	Octopussy Girl	
1985	A View to a Kill	Kimberley Jones	
1985	House	Tanya	
1987	Open House	Katie Thatcher	
1988	The Opponent	Gilda Duranti	
1988	Caddyshack II	Girl in Bar	Cameo
1988	Alien Terminator	Maureen De Havilland	
1988	Strike Commando 2	Rosanna Boom	
1989	Howling V: The Rebirth	Anna	
1989	Born to Fight	Maryline Kane	
1993	Desire	Adrienne	
1996	The Devil Takes a Holiday	Tina	
2005	The Story of Bob	Inga Jones	
2019	The Christmas Pause	Aunt Viv	
2021	Barking Mad	Katya Philipova	

=== Television ===
Year	Title	Role	Notes
1983	Arthur the King	Princess	TV film
1985	Hotel	Sandy Tanner	Episode: "Distortions"
1986	Still the Beaver	Maria	Episode: "Miss Honeywell Comes to Town"
1987	The Days and Nights of Molly Dodd	Kirsten Haaken	2 episodes
1989	Night Court	Jacqueline	Episode: "Life with Buddy"
1990	Twin Peaks	Heba	2 episodes
1995	Days of Our Lives	Rhonda	Episode: #1.7678
