= Vendetta dal futuro =

- Theatrical release poster by Renato Casaro
- Directed by: Sergio Martino
- Screenplay by: Sergio Martino; Sauro Scavolini; Elisa Livia Briganti; John Crowther
- Story by: Sergio Martino
- Produced by: Luciano Martino
- Starring: Daniel Greene; Janet Agren
- Cinematography: Giancarlo Ferrando
- Edited by: Aldo Devgen
- Music by: Claudio Simonetti
- Production companies: Dania Film; Medusa Distribuzione; National Cinematografica
- Distributed by: Medusa Distribuzione
- Running time: 94 minutes
- Country: Italy

Vendetta dal futuro (lit. 'Vengeance from the future', also known as Hands of Steel) is an Italian science fiction film directed by Sergio Martino. The film stars Daniel Greene, George Eastman and John Saxon.

== Plot ==
An evil industrialist (John Saxon) has created a cyborg (Daniel Greene) who is 70% robot and 30% human. When the cyborg rebels, he ends up working at a bar frequented by arm wrestling enthusiasts. The cyborg just wants to be left alone but he is hounded by Saxon's men, the government, and the arm wrestlers.

== Cast ==
- Daniel Greene as Paco Queruak
- Janet Agren as Linda
- Claudio Cassinelli as Peter Howell
- John Saxon as Francis Turner
- George Eastman as Raul Morales
- Roberto Bisacco as Cooper
- Pat Monti
- Andrea Coppola as Eddie

== Production ==
Hands of Steel was filmed in Arizona with some scenes shot at the Grand Canyon and the town of Arcosanti. Actor Claudio Cassinelli died in Page, Arizona during production as he was on a helicopter that crashed into the Navajo Bridge.

== Style ==
Howard Hughes noted that the film belongs to a group of Italian film productions that borrowed elements from the film The Terminator, including Bruno Mattei's Shocking Dark and Nello Rossati's Alien Terminator. In his overview of 1980s action films, Daniel R. Budnik described the film as "the hybrid movie to end all hybrid movies", noting The Terminator and Blade Runner as influences, as well as the plot later being borrowed for Over the Top.

== Release ==
Vendetta dal futuro passed Italian censors in 1986. The film has been released with the English titles of Atomic Cyborg and Hands of Steel.

== Reception ==
From retrospective reviews, Hughes described Vendetta dal futuro as "the best example" of a film in debt to The Terminator, noting its other influences of Blade Runner with a karate-fighting android and praising an action sequence featuring lorries, cars and helicopters as well as the score. Budnik found that the film's beginning was boring with its more political elements, but improved after these scenes and that it was "fine, furious desert action with arm wrestling, and some sort of strange cyborg woman thrown in to confuse things." Donald Guarisco of AllMovie described the film as a "decent time-killer for b-movie fans" noting that its "southwestern setting gives it a unique flavor and Sergio Martino (using the pseudonym of "Martin Dolman") does a decent job of delivering plentiful action on a shoestring budget: his best moment might be a scene where the hero has to fend off gun-toting assassins while also fighting a pair of disguised cyborgs in close quarters." Guarisco concluded that "The end results are frequently silly (it takes the police a really long time to figure out they're hunting a cyborg) but never dull" and declared the film to be "strictly for the b-movie audience but they're likely to enjoy its low-budget fun."
