= Topline =

Topline or TopLine may refer to:

- DeSoto Firedome Topline series, an automobile series
- TopLine Game Labs

== See also ==
- "Topline", a songwriting technique used by songwriters
- "Topline", a 2023 song by Stray Kids from 5-Star
- Alien Terminator (1988 film), also known as Top Line, a 1988 Italian film
- The revenue in the income statement is also called top line.
- The way dancers hold their upper bodies is called top line; see Glossary of partner dance terms#Top line.
