= Luisa Mattioli =

Italian actress (1936–2021)

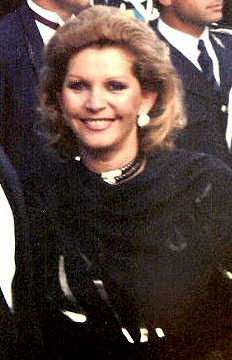
- Mattioli in 1989
- Born: 23 March 1936; San Stino di Livenza, Italy
- Died: 5 October 2021 (aged 85); Zürich, Switzerland
- Occupation: Actress
- Spouse: Roger Moore (m. 1969; div. 2000)
- Children: 3, including Deborah

Luisa Mattioli (23 March 1936 – 5 October 2021) was an Italian actress. She was active in cinema and television during the 1950s and 1960s, and was notably the third wife of Roger Moore.

== Biography ==
Mattioli worked as a cashier at Doney's, a cafe on the Via Veneto in Rome, Italy prior to becoming an actress. After enrolling in film school, she traveled to England, where she found work in the television and movie industries.

Mattioli and Roger Moore met in 1961 while filming Romulus and the Sabines. Moore was married to Dorothy Squires at the time, and Squires refused to divorce him. Moore and Mattioli ultimately lived together for eight years, and became the parents of two children before Squires relented. Following his divorce, Moore and Mattioli were married on 11 April 1969. They subsequently became the parents of a third child. Their three children were: Deborah, Geoffrey and Christian.

Moore and Mattioli subsequently separated in 1993 and were divorced in 2000.

== Death ==
Mattioli died in Zürich, Switzerland on October 5, 2021, at the age of 85.

== Filmography ==
=== Film ===
- Napoli sole mio! (1956)
- Presentimento (1956)
- The Angel of the Alps (1957)
- Mia nonna poliziotto (1958)
- La spada di Damocle (1958)
- Serenatella sciuè sciuè (1958)
- Some Like It Cold (1960)
- Romulus and the Sabines (1961)
- Oh Islam (1961)
- The Corsican Brothers (1961)
- Eighteen in the Sun (1962)
- Un branco di vigliacchi (1962)
- Storm Over Ceylon (1963)
- Le Roi du village (1963)

=== Television ===
- Il caso Maurizius (1961)
