= Weekend Warriors (1986 film) =

1986 film by Bert Convy

- Theatrical release poster by Drew Struzan
- Directed by: Bert Convy
- Written by: Bruce Belland; Roy M. Rogosin
- Story by: Bruce Belland
- Produced by: Cami Taylor
- Starring: Chris Lemmon; Lloyd Bridges; Vic Tayback; Graham Jarvis
- Narrated by: Chris Lemmon
- Cinematography: Charles Minsky
- Edited by: Raja Gosnell
- Music by: Perry Botkin Jr.
- Production companies: Convy-Fimberg Productions; Hollywood Air Force Base Associates Ltd.
- Distributed by: Moviestore Entertainment
- Release dates: September 18, 1986 (West Germany); October 29, 1986 (U.S.)
- Running time: 89 minutes
- Country: United States
- Language: English
- Box office: $351,623

Weekend Warriors (also known as Hollywood Air Force) is a 1986 independently made American military service comedy film directed by Bert Convy and starring Chris Lemmon, Vic Tayback, Graham Jarvis, Lloyd Bridges, and Mark L. Taylor. It was distributed by Moviestore Entertainment and produced by Cami Taylor.

== Plot ==
In 1961, shortly after the Bay of Pigs invasion, another world crisis with the Soviets looms in Berlin. A motley group of Hollywood actors, writers, stuntmen, makeup artists, and various studio personnel have avoided being drafted into regular military service. The misfit group, led by Hollywood screenwriter Vince Tucker, have joined the California Air National Guard's air transport wing, the 73rd, volunteering one weekend a month as "weekend warriors" in order to keep themselves safely at home.

They run afoul of visiting Congressman Ernest W. Balljoy when he comes upon one of their questionable and tasteless pranks while touring the airbase. In retaliation, to remove them from his district, he announces in a national press release that they are ready to be called up for active Air Force duty to meet the looming Soviet threat in Berlin. (In actuality, Balljoy will see to it that they are transferred to the isolated Pacific island where the U.S. stores its atomic warheads.) Now faced with having to pass a full Air National Guard readiness inspection or be drafted, Tucker and his Hollywood cronies must come up with a plan that will thwart Balljoy and insure they remain only weekend warriors.

Using their professional Hollywood connections and showbiz skills, they execute a lavish deception plan conceived by Tucker. Having hired other Hollywood studio professionals, and with Vince acting as their "director", they put on a show like no other for the reviewing Air Force brass and visiting dignitaries. Using old fashioned Hollywood magic, they portray themselves as "The Fighting 73rd," just an average (read: crack, more than ready for action) Air National Guard transport unit. They succeed in impressing the Air Force brass, an astonished Congressman Balljoy, and a taciturn visiting Romanian ambassador, who will quickly report back to the Soviets on America's military readiness during this time of international crisis. Sometime later, the victorious 73rd celebrates their "Hollywood Air Force" propaganda victory at a raucous "back to civies" blow-out bash in Las Vegas.

== Cast ==
- Chris Lemmon as Vince Tucker
- Vic Tayback as Sergeant Burge
- Graham Jarvis as Congressman Ernest W. Balljoy
- Lloyd Bridges as Colonel Archer
- Mark L. Taylor as Captain Cabot
- Brian Bradley as Seacomb
- Alan Campbell as Duckworth
- Marty Cohen as Decola
- Daniel Greene as McCracken
- Art Kimbro as Izzy
- Matt McCoy as Ames
- Jeff Meyer as Dawson
- Frank Mugavero as Barker
- Juney Smith as "Ain't"
- Tom Villard as Seblinsky
- Camille Saviola as Betty Beep
- Brenda Strong as Danielle
- Bruce Belland as Svenson
- Stephen M. Bottroff as Romanian Ambassador
- Deep Roy as Little girl (uncredited)
- Douglas G. Rich as Handsome airman (uncredited)
- Joe Hart as Officer Cooley
- M. Stephen Gardner (Background extra) as Uniformed Airman & Newspaper Photographer

== Reception ==
Weekend Warriors was not critically reviewed on its theatrical release. The home media version, however, was extensively reviewed, primarily with negative assessments. TV Guide's review was particularly blunt: "Honestly, there isn't one moment in this alleged comedy that anyone over the age of seven would find even remotely funny". Staff writer Howard Miller of The Courier-Journal in Louisville, Kentucky, summed up the majority of the reviews: "...'Weekend Warriors' probably isn't the worst movie I've seen in my years of doing reviews, but it most certainly is the dumbest. And I mean dumb, dumb, DUMB! This is a comedy devoid of laughs, bereft of wit and totally lacking in charm". At the film review aggregator website Rotten Tomatoes, reviewers gave the film a 38% "Like" rating.

== Release and box office ==
Weekend Warriors had its first screening on August 29, 1986 in San Antonio, TX and then opened nationally in October 29 of the same year. The film's domestic gross was $351,623 and was a disappointment at the box office.

== Home media ==
Weekend Warriors was released as Hollywood Air Force on Region 1 VHS in 1986 by Metro Goldwyn Mayer Home Video. It has since been released overseas on Region 2 DVD under the title Crazy Air Force. Under its title Hollywood Air Force, the comedy can be rented or purchased via Amazon Prime's streaming service.
