= Into the Sun (1992 film) =

1992 film by Fritz Kiersch

- Theatrical release poster
- Directed by: Fritz Kiersch
- Written by: John Brancato; Michael Ferris
- Produced by: Kevin M. Kallberg; Oliver G. Hess; Jim Begg; Mark Amin
- Starring: Michael Paré; Anthony Michael Hall; Deborah Moore
- Cinematography: Steve Grass
- Edited by: Barry Zetlin
- Music by: Randy Miller
- Production company: Trimark Pictures
- Distributed by: Trimark Pictures
- Release date: January 31, 1992 (U.S.)
- Running time: 101 minutes
- Country: United States
- Language: English
- Budget: $7 million
- Box office: $641,886

Into the Sun is a 1992 action comedy film involving a pilot and actor thrown into a dangerous situation. The film stars Michael Paré and Anthony Michael Hall.

== Plot ==
Paul "Shotgun" Watkins is an American pilot stationed in Sicily who patrols the Middle East. He is taken off his normal duties to orient Tom Slade, a conceited actor, about being a fighter pilot in the United States Air Force for an upcoming film role. Slade wants to "get the feeling" before he plays the part in a film. When shown fighter aircraft, Tom says dismissively: "F-14, F-16, whatever. I'm not good with numbers. I've got accountants for numbers."

During one exchange where Slade is discussing his film's script with Paul, he states that his character – facing a dire situation from which he will likely not survive – riffs in a John Wayne-ish accent that, upon being shot down and facing the prospect of a crash landing, he has no problem with death and it's akin to "flying right into the sun" (the title of this 1992 film). Paul thinks this bit of dialogue is not very realistic. When Slade asks Paul what he would say in such a dire situation, Paul responds, "Oh, I don't know. Maybe something like OH SHIT!"

Paul is determined to show the cocky Hollywood actor that being a fighter pilot isn't as easy as Slade thinks it is. But after Slade, with no flying experience whatsoever, excels during a flight simulator session, Paul begins to question the value of his own flying ability. When Paul accompanies Slade to an oxygen-deprivation chamber so that the actor can better understand the importance of maintaining composure at high altitudes, Slade appears unaffected while Paul, far more experienced in such an environment, eventually winds up becoming disoriented. He has to have his oxygen mask placed on him by the simulation's proctor.

Ultimately, Watkins takes Slade for a ride in an F-16 fighter and subjects him to extreme aerial maneuvers. Paul is gratified when the actor becomes disoriented and nearly vomits. Soon thereafter, having inadvertently crossed into the airspace of a hostile country, they are shot down and find themselves stranded behind enemy lines. Paul and Slade must then find a way to mend their differences and find a way back to safety.

== Cast ==
- Anthony Michael Hall as Tom Slade
- Michael Paré as Captain Paul "Shotgun" Watkins
- Deborah Moore as Major Goode (as Deborah Maria Moore)
- Terry Kiser as Mitchell Burton
- Brian Haley as Lieutenant DeCarlo
- Michael St. Gerard as Lieutenant Wolf
- Linden Ashby as "Dragon"
- Melissa Moore as Female Sergeant

== Production ==
Into the Sun began shooting March 12, 1991, with principal photography completed on April 25, 1991. Most of its aerial footage are taken from Iron Eagle movie stock (hence its Israeli Air Force camouflage, but USAF roundels). The filming in Israel provided the aerial sequences choreographed by Jim Gavin, whose earlier works include Blue Thunder. (Note: The aircraft used for both the American and the enemy air forces were Israeli jets: single-seat F-16As, two-seat F-16Bs, and F-21/C-2 Kfirs simulating MiG-23s (the latter painted with imaginary national markings).)

== Reception ==
Film historian and reviewer Leonard Maltin noted that Into the Sun was very similar to scenario seen in The Hard Way (1991) starring Michael J. Fox and James Woods. The two films, however had a "change of milieu and budget. He summarized his appraisal as "aerial stunts aren't bad considering the threadbare production values, but it's only for those who'll try out anything that pops up on the video store shelves."

Janet Maslin in her review for The New York Times, noted that the comedy elements dominated. "Mr. Hall, whose earlier performances (in films like "National Lampoon's Vacation" and "Sixteen Candles") have been much goofier, remains coolly funny and graduates to subtler forms of comedy with this role. ... Mr. Pare, who looks like a model and sounds like a wrier version of Sylvester Stallone, makes an appropriately staunch straight man. He and Deborah Maria Moore, as the pert major who attracts both Tom and Shotgun, give the film a decorative luster it might otherwise lack. Terry Kiser has some amusing moments as the loudmouth talent manager who, asked if the "star" and "sensation" who is his client can be described as "Tom Slade, the actor," pauses nervously. He thinks that may be going too far."
