= The Opponent (1988 film) =

- Directed by: Sergio Martino
- Written by: Robert Brodie Booth; Maria Perrone Capano; Sergio Martino; Sauro Scavolini
- Story by: Luciano Martino
- Starring: Daniel Greene; Giuliano Gemma; Ernest Borgnine
- Cinematography: Giancarlo Ferrando
- Edited by: Eugenio Alabiso
- Music by: Luciano Michelini
- Release date: 1988
- Running time: 90 minutes
- Country: Italy
- Language: English

The Opponent (Italian: Qualcuno pagherà, also known as Uppercut Man) is a 1988 Italian sport comedy-drama film directed by Sergio Martino and starring Daniel Greene, Giuliano Gemma and Ernest Borgnine.

== Cast ==
- Daniel Greene as Bobby Mulligan
- Giuliano Gemma as Martin Duranti
- Ernest Borgnine as Victor
- Keely Shaye Smith as Anne
- Mary Stavin as Gilda Duranti
- Bill Wohrman as Larry
- James Warring as Eddy
- A. J. Duhe as Baby
- Herb Goldstein as Doctor
- Ruben Rabasa as Ollie
- Lenny Moore as Duncan
- Scotty Gallin as Pappy
- Mark McCraken as Don
