= Daniel Greene (actor) =

American actor

Daniel Greene is an American actor, best known for his role as Dwayne Cooley in the television series Falcon Crest, and as Paco Queruak in the 1986 action–sci fi movie Vendetta dal futuro.

== Career ==
Greene appeared in episodes of Alice, Dynasty, Three's Company, Matt Houston, Emerald Point N.A.S., The A-Team, Scarecrow and Mrs. King, Night Court, Remington Steele, L.A. Law, Santa Barbara and Matlock.

He also appeared in the films Weekend Warriors, Pulsebeat, Hands of Steel, Arthur 2: On the Rocks, Elvira, Mistress of the Dark, There's Something About Mary, Me, Myself & Irene, Shallow Hal and Stuck on You.

== Filmography ==
=== Film ===
Year	Title	Role	Notes
1984	The Rosebud Beach Hotel	Brad	
1985	Pulsebeat	Roger	
1985	Stitches	Ted Fletcher	
1985	Deadly Intruder	Danny	
1986	Vendetta dal futuro	Paco Queruak	
1986	Weekend Warriors	McCracken	
1987	Hammerhead	Hammer	
1988	Striker	Truck Driver	Uncredited
1988	Skeleton Coast	Rick Weston	
1988	The Opponent	Bobby Mulligan	
1988	Arthur 2: On the Rocks	Troy	
1988	Elvira: Mistress of the Dark	Bob Redding	
1989	American Rickshaw	Francis	
1990	Beyond Kilimanjaro, Across the River of Blood	Jake	
1990	Soldier of Fortune	Vincent Miles / Johnny Hondo	
1990	After the Condor	Mark	
1995	The Maddening	Cop	
1996	Kingpin	Calvert Munson	
1998	There's Something About Mary	Pizza House Man	
2000	Me, Myself & Irene	Dickie Thurman	
2001	Shallow Hal	Doctor	
2003	A Touch of Fate	Craig	
2003	Stuck on You	Mr. Tourist	
2005	Fever Pitch	Waiter	
2010	Genghis Khan: The Story of a Lifetime	Mikuli	
2011	Hall Pass	Officer #1	
2014	Dumb and Dumber To	Wheelchair Ninja	
2017	Hot Summer Nights	Drive-In Patron	
2018	Green Book	Macon Cop #1	

=== Television ===
Year	Title	Role	Notes
1982	General Hospital	Felix	Episode dated 19 February 1982
1983	Trapper John, M.D.	Orderly	Episode: "Hear Today, Gone Tomorrow"
1983	Alice	Aardvark	Episode: "Jolene and the Night Watchman"
1983	Three's Company	Police Officer	Episode: "The Money Machine"
1983	Dynasty	Chauffeur	Episode: "The Note"
1983	Matt Houston	McNeal / Gregory	2 episodes
1984	Emerald Point N.A.S.	Chauffeur	2 episodes
1984	Scarecrow and Mrs. King	Tony	Episode: "Weekend"
1984	Gone Are the Dayes	Larry	Television film
1984	The A-Team	Ray Evans	Episode: "Double Heat"
1985	Night Court	Brent	Episode: "An Old Flame"
1985	Brothers	Buck	Episode: "An Affair to Remember"
1985–1986	Falcon Crest	Dwayne Cooley	24 episodes
1986	The Hitchhiker	Bad Lover	Episode: "Last Scene"
1986	Remington Steele	Tony Petz	Episode: "Steele Alive and Kicking"
1988	L.A. Law	Jack Seiling	Episode: "Petticoat Injunction"
1991	Shades of LA	Walter Evers	Episode: "Till Death Do Us Part"
1991	Babes	Fantasy Rusty	Episode: "Babes in Boyland"
1992	Santa Barbara	Antonio	4 episodes
1995	Matlock	Personal Trainer	Episode: "The Scam"
1997	Savannah	Thug #1	Episode: "Oh No, Mr. Bill"
1997	The Tom Show	Don	Episode: "A Tom Story"
2013	Clear History	Coffee Shop Patron	Television film
2017	Loudermilk	Sheriff	Episode: "Highway 10 Revisited"
2021	The Now	Episcopalian Priest	Episode: "Don't Shush Your Mother"
