= Mitch Gaylord =

American gymnast (born 1961)

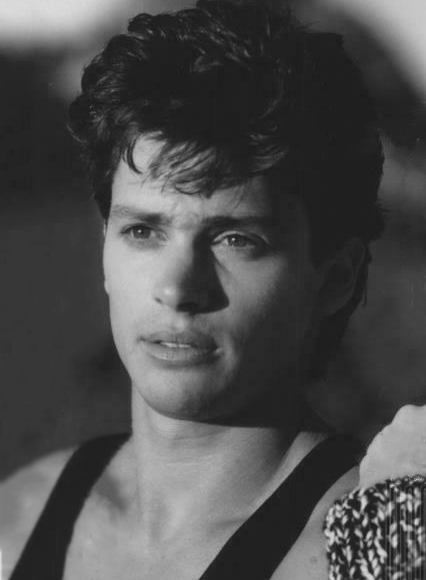
- Gaylord in 1985

Personal information
- Full name: Mitchell Jay Gaylord
- Born: March 10, 1961 (age 65) Van Nuys, California, U.S.
- Height: 174 cm (5 ft 9 in)

Gymnastics career
- Discipline: Men's artistic gymnastics
- Country represented: United States
- College team: UCLA Bruins
- Eponymous skills: Gaylord 1 (horizontal bar); Gaylord 2 (horizontal bar)
Medal record
Men's artistic gymnastics
Representing United States
Event	1st	2nd	3rd
Olympic Games	1	1	2
Total	1	1	2
Olympic Games
Gold medal – first place	1984 Los Angeles	Team
Silver medal – second place	1984 Los Angeles	Vault
Bronze medal – third place	1984 Los Angeles	Rings
Bronze medal – third place	1984 Los Angeles	Parallel bars

Mitchell Jay Gaylord (born March 10, 1961) is an American gymnast, actor, and 1984 Los Angeles Olympic gold medalist in gymnastics. He was a member of the United States men's national artistic gymnastics team.

== Early life and education ==
Gaylord was born in Van Nuys, California, the son of Fred and Linda Gaylord, and is Jewish. Gaylord graduated from Grant High School.

== Gymnastics career ==
He made his first U.S. National team in gymnastics in 1980 and continued to retain his place on the team until 1984. He competed in the 1981 Maccabiah Games, winning five gold medals. While attending UCLA as a history major on scholarship, he won the All-Around in the 1983 and 1984 USA Gymnastics National Championships, and the 1984 NCAA Men's Gymnastics Championship. He then qualified for the Olympic Games during the Olympic trials held from June 1–3, 1984 in Jacksonville Florida. Two of the moves in his arsenal going into the Games were invented by and named for him—the Gaylord flip and the Gaylord II.

=== 1984 Olympic Games ===
In the 1984 Summer Olympic Games, Gaylord led the gold-medal-winning U.S. men's gymnastics team, becoming the first American gymnast to score a perfect 10.00 in the Olympics. He also won the silver medal in vault, the bronze in parallel bars, and the bronze in the rings. In addition to his individual accolades, Gaylord led the US men's gymnastics team to a gold medal in the team competition for the first time in Olympic history. The moment was heralded as a significant upset over the teams from China and Japan. After the 1984 Olympics he and his fellow Olympic gymnasts went on a six-month promotional tour across the US, selling out arenas in about two dozen American cities. He also wrote his first book during this period, centering on using gymnastics exercises to train. He was also named by President Ronald Reagan as a member of the President's Council on Physical Fitness and Sports in November 1985.

== Post-gymnastics career ==
Gaylord has appeared in several movies and TV shows. Most notably, he performed as a stunt double for Chris O'Donnell (as Robin) and the uncredited role of Mitch Grayson (Robin's older brother) in the 1995 movie Batman Forever, and played the lead in American Anthem (1986), opposite actress Janet Jones. The latter movie, in which Gaylord played a gymnast training for the Olympics, has been noted as an inspiration to future generations of Olympic gymnasts. He was also a frequent guest star on Hollywood Squares, and appeared in advertisements for Diet Coke, Nike, Inc., Vidal Sassoon, Soloflex, Levi Strauss & Co., and Texaco.

Gaylord has also remained an ambassador for gymnastics, serving as a commentator for NBC and Fox Sports during televised gymnastics events, and developing several nationally televised fitness programs and products.

Since retiring from acting, Gaylord has worked as a financial advisor at Morgan Stanley Smith Barney. He has also been an advocate for child allergy awareness.

== Legacy and honors ==
In June 2007, Gaylord was named the seventh-best U.S. gymnast of all time by Yahoo Sports. In 1990, he was inducted into the Southern California Jewish Sports Hall of Fame. He was also named to the UCLA Hall of Fame in 1995, the US Olympic Hall of Fame in 2005, and the International Jewish Sports Hall of Fame in 2009.

== Personal life ==
Gaylord is married to Hay House Author Valentina Gaylord with whom he has two children. He was previously married to model and actress Deborah Driggs, with whom he has three children.

== Eponymous skills ==
Gaylord has two named elements on the horizontal bar.

Gymnastics elements named after Mitch Gaylord
Apparatus	Name	Description	Difficulty (Note: Valid for the 2025–2028 Code of Points)	Added to Code of Points
Horizontal bar	Gaylord 1	"Salto fwd, tuck over the bar, also from el-grip."	E, 0.5	1985
Horizontal bar	Gaylord 2	"Salto bwd. ½ t. piked over the bar."	E, 0.5	1989

== Filmography ==
=== Film ===
Year	Title	Role	Notes
1976	Logan's Run	Cub	Uncredited
1986	American Anthem	Steve Tevere	
1989	American Rickshaw	Scott Edwards	
1994	Sexual Outlaws	Francis Badham	
1995	Batman Forever	N/A	Stunts
1995	Mortal Kombat	N/A	Stunts
1995	Savate	N/A	Stunts
2005	Confessions of an Action Star	Brother	
2007	Jocking Around	Himself	Documentary

=== Television ===
Year	Title	Role	Notes
1984	Diff'rent Strokes	Himself	1 episode
1991	The New Dragnet	Roger Tolan	1 episode
1992	Animal Instincts	Rod Tennison	Video
1992	Vicki!	Himself	1 episode
1994	Joe Bob's Drive-In Theater	Rod Tennison	1 episode; archival footage
2008	Celebrity Circus	Himself/Judge	6 episodes
2009, 2010	The J Report	Himself	2 episodes

== See also ==
- List of Olympic medalists in gymnastics (men)
- List of select Jewish gymnasts
