= 100 Mile Rule =

- Directed by: Brent Huff
- Written by: Drew Pillsbury
- Starring: Jake Weber; Maria Bello; David Thornton; Michael McKean; Nick Chinlund; Shawn Huff
- Release date: 2002
- Running time: 98 min
- Country: United States
- Language: English

100 Mile Rule is a 2002 comedy film directed by Brent Huff.

== Premise ==
Three salesmen from Detroit come to Los Angeles for a two-week seminar and get themselves involved in a world of trouble when their 'fun' snowballs into a roller-coaster ride of secrets, guilt, peer pressure and stupidity.
