= American Rickshaw =

- Promotional release poster
- Directed by: Martin Dolman
- Screenplay by: Sauro Scavolini; Roberto Leoni; Maria Perrone Capano
- Story by: Sergio Martino; Roberto Leoni
- Produced by: Ricky Sacco
- Starring: Mitch Gaylord; Daniel Greene; Victoria Prouty; Donald Pleasence
- Cinematography: Giancarlo Ferrando
- Edited by: Eugenio Alabiso
- Music by: Luciano Michelini
- Production companies: Medusa Distribuzione; Dania Film; National Cinematografica
- Distributed by: Medusa Distribuzione
- Release date: 1989
- Running time: 96 minutes
- Countries: Italy; United States
- Language: English

American Rickshaw (Italian: American risciò), also known as American Tiger, is a 1989 action fantasy film directed by Sergio Martino under the pseudonym of Martin Dolman. An international co-production of Italy and the United States, it stars Mitch Gaylord, Daniel Greene, Victoria Prouty and Donald Pleasence.

== Plot ==
A manual rickshaw driver in Miami becomes embroiled in a murder case involving a recent acquaintance. He becomes caught in a conflict between opposing forces of good and evil: an ancient Chinese witch and an evangelist who is revealed to be the embodiment of the devil.

== Cast ==
- Mitch Gaylord as Scott Edwards
- Daniel Greene as Francis
- Victoria Prouty as Joanna Simpson
- Donald Pleasence as Reverend Mortom
- Michi Kobi as Old Madame Luna

== Production ==
Filming took place in Miami, Florida.

== Home media ==
In 2020, a 2K restoration of the film was released on Blu-ray by Cauldron Films.
