= The Bad Pack =

- DVD cover
- Directed by: Brent Huff
- Written by: Brent Huff; Douglas L. Walton
- Produced by: David A. Jackson; Terence M. O'Keefe; John Orland; Shauna Shapiro Jackson; Rustam Branaman; Rod Wasserman
- Starring: Robert Davi; Roddy Piper; Ralf Möller; Larry B. Scott; Shawn Huff; Patrick Dollaghan
- Cinematography: Richard A. Jones
- Edited by: Frank Muto
- Music by: Bob Christianson
- Production company: Sandwedge Films
- Distributed by: Lionsgate Home Entertainment; Showcase Entertainment; Ascot Films; Audio Visual Entertainment (Greece); Avalanche Home Entertainment; Broadway (Japan)
- Release dates: November 11, 1997 (Germany); July 21, 1998 (U.S.)
- Running time: 81 minutes
- Country: United States
- Language: English

The Bad Pack is a 1997 independent action film written and directed by Brent Huff, and starring Robert Davi, Roddy Piper, Ralf Möller, Larry B. Scott, Shawn Huff, and Patrick Dollaghan. The film also stars Brent Huff, Marshall R. Teague, Daniel Zacapa, Bert Rosario, Michael Cole, Robert Swenson and Sven-Ole Thorsen. The Bad Pack was Swenson's last film appearance before his death of heart failure.

== Plot ==
A town of Mexican immigrants on the Texas border hire a team of mercenaries to protect them against an underground militia group, who try to claim the town as their own.

== Cast ==
- Robert Davi as McQue
- Roddy Piper as Dash Simms
- Ralf Möller as Kurt Mayer (credited as Ralf Moeller)
- Larry B. Scott as Jeremy Britt
- Shawn Huff as Remi Sykes
- Patrick Dollaghan as Latrell Hoffman
- Brent Huff as Callin
- Marshall R. Teague as Lamont Sperry
- Daniel Zacapa as Hector Chavez
- Bert Rosario as Jose Chavez
- Michael Cole as Fredrickson
- Sven-Ole Thorsen as Sven
- Vernon Wells as Biker
- Cristan Crocker-Reilly as Carmen
- Clifton Collins, Jr. as Townsman 1
- Joe Unger as Fight Promoter
- Robert Swenson as Missouri Mule (final film role)

== Reception ==
The film was poorly received. It "unavoidably lacks complexity in its treatment of contexts, still it is singular in registering the intensive activity of the militia movement in the 1990s United States", noted a comment on its political dimension.
