= Deborah Moore =

English actress (born 1963)

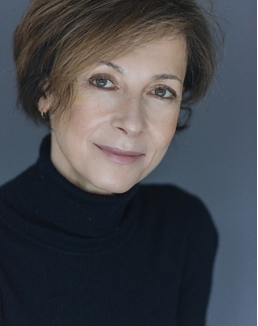
- Born: Deborah Maria Luisa Moore; 27 October 1963 (age 63); Marylebone, London, England
- Other name: Deborah Barrymore
- Occupations: Actress; voice actress
- Years active: 1971–present
- Spouse: Jeremy Green (m. 1989; div. 1994)
- Parent(s): Roger Moore (father); Luisa Mattioli (mother)

Deborah Maria Luisa Moore (born 27 October 1963) is an English actress. She is the daughter of actor Roger Moore and Italian actress Luisa Mattioli.

== Career ==
She made her debut on TV as a child in The Persuaders! episode "The Long Goodbye" (albeit credited as "Dedorah Moore") in which her father co-starred alongside Tony Curtis, and early on in her career, she was often billed as "Deborah Barrymore". She appeared in such films as Lionheart (1987), Alien Terminator (1988), the 1990 comedy, Bullseye! (opposite her father), Chaplin (1992), Into the Sun (1992), and South Kensington (2001). She is best known in the UK as the face of the Scottish Widows advertising campaign from 1986 to 1995.

She has twice made appearances in James Bond–related productions. She played a secretary in the 1989 biopic Goldeneye: The Secret Life of Ian Fleming and later made a cameo appearance as a flight attendant in the 2002 Bond film, Die Another Day, which was Pierce Brosnan's fourth and final Bond film. She also appeared in the 1998 TV movie Merlin: The Quest Begins, opposite Jason Connery, son of former Bond Sean Connery. Her godfather was actor Robert Brown, her father's co-star in the television series Ivanhoe and three Bond films. In 2006, Moore made the film Provoked. Jagmohan Mundhra's film is based on the UK domestic violence case in which Kiranjit Singh Ahluwalia was jailed in London for killing her abusive husband. Based on her story, the film stars Aishwarya Rai as Ahluwalia. Moore plays Jackie, another prison inmate.

Moore appeared as Alfidia, the mother of a fictionalised Livia, in two 2007 episodes of the HBO/BBC series Rome.

Moore appeared in the series 1 finale of Sherlock, "The Great Game" in August 2010, where she played the first victim of Jim Moriarty.

In 2022, Moore provided narration on a series of Italian cookery videos for friend Laura Giunta.

In 2024, Deborah narrated the audio book The Magic Snowman and the Rusty Ice Skates, featuring the voice of her father as the character of the magic snowman, Lumi Ukko. In honoring her father's legacy to help children's causes universally, she has supported the producer's pledge to allocate 20 percent of the proceeds to UNICEF, her father's favorite charity.

== Personal life ==
From 1989 to 1994, Moore was married to Jeremy Green.

== Filmography ==
=== Television series ===
Year	Title	Role	Notes
1971	The Persuaders!	Deborah	Episode: The Long Goodbye
1977	Aspen	Debra	TV Mini series
1990	Zorro	Amanda Herrera	Episode: The Tease
1992	Days of Our Lives	Danielle Stevens	42 episodes
1992	Mann & Machine	Victoria Van Der Zalm	Episode: Cold, Cold Heart
1992	Shelley	Julie	Episode: Come Fly with Me
1993	Quantum Leap	Claudia	Episode: Blood Moon
1994	The Wanderer	Clare	Episode: Waste Not, Want Not
2000	Doctors Season 2	Clare Moody	Episode: A Model Patient
2007	Rome	Alfidia	Episode: A Necessary Fiction
2009	Midsomer Murders	Mel	Episode: The Great and the Good
2010	Sherlock	Crying Woman	Episode: The Great Game
2013	Casualty	Vicky Heaton	Episode: Rabbits in Headlights
2014	Doctors Season 16	Celestia Heyworth	Episode: Heaven Can Wait
2021	The Nevers	Fancy Lady / High Society Woman	Episode: Exposure & Episode: Alright, Okay, You, Win

=== Film ===
Year	Title	Role	Notes
1984	Warriors of the Apocalypse	Princess Sheela	(credited as Debrah Moore)
1987	Lionheart	Mathilda	(credited as Deborah Barrymore)
1988	Alien Terminator	June	(credited as Deborah Barrymore)
1989	Goldeneye: The Secret Life of Ian Fleming	Secretary	(credited as Deborah Barrymore)
1990	Bullseye!	Flo Fleming	(credited as Deborah Barrymore)
1991	Into the Sun	Maj. Goode	(credited as Deborah Maria Moore)
1991	Trauma	Susannah Hopkins	(credited as Deborah Barrymore)
1992	Chaplin	Lita Grey	(credited as Deborah Maria Moore)
1996	On Dangerous Ground	Hannah Bernstein	
1996	London Suite	Meg Dolby	
1997	Midnight Man	Hannah Bernstein	
1998	Merlin	Nimue	
2001	South Kensington	Direttrice Bulgari	
2002	Die Another Day	Air Hostess	
2006	Provoked	Jackie	
2009	Tales of the Fourth Dimension	Professor	
2015	Crown for Christmas	Mrs. Hinden	
2015	Assassin	Laura Boyd	
2016	We Still Steal the Old Way	Anne-Marie	

=== Video games ===
List of voice performances in video games
Year	Title	Role	Notes
2009	Dragon Age: Origins	Teyrna Eleanor Cousland / Jetta / Widow / Hooded Courier	Xbox 360
2011	Dragon Age II	Leandra Hawke / Madam Lusine / Sister Colinda / Annoyed Viscount's Keep Noblewoman / Gallows Courtyard Templar Lieutenant	Xbox 360
2011	Dragon Age II: Mark of the Assassin	Chateau Haine Cook	Xbox 360
2013	Killzone: Mercenary	Valeria Harkin	PlayStation Vita
2015	Star Wars: Battlefront	Pilot / Computer voice / Fighter	Xbox One
2017	Mass Effect: Andromeda	The Benefactor / Knight / Nexus Crew	PlayStation 4
