= Armed Response (1986 film) =

1986 film by Fred Olen Ray

- Theatrical release poster
- Directed by: Fred Olen Ray
- Screenplay by: T.L. Lankford
- Story by: Fred Olen Ray; T.L. Lankford; Paul Hertzberg
- Produced by: Paul Hertzberg
- Starring: David Carradine; Lee Van Cleef; Mako
- Cinematography: Paul Elliott
- Edited by: Miriam L. Preissel
- Music by: Thomas Chase; Steve Rucker
- Distributed by: CineTel Films
- Release date: October 3, 1986
- Running time: 86 minutes
- Country: United States
- Language: English

Armed Response is a 1986 American action thriller film co-written and directed by Fred Olen Ray and starring David Carradine, Lee Van Cleef, Brent Huff, Michael Berryman and Mako. It was the first action film made by CineTel Films and distributed by Metro Goldwyn Mayer.

== Synopsis ==
In an unnamed American city, one of the men working for a dangerous Yakuza boss known as Akira Tanaka steals a statuette that Tanaka had planned to use as a peace offering between the local Yakuza and a rival Chinese tong. After Tanaka recovers the statuette and kills the bandit with the help of his underling F.C., two private investigators are hired for the exchange of bailout money to restore the statuette to its rightful place. However, their business plan to recover it statue gets worse and both investiagors are killed. Clay Roth is one of them, and the news of his murder infuriates his brothers Jim and Tommy Roth and their father, Burt Roth. What the Yakuza gang does not know is that all three of them happen to be war veterans, so they arm themselves and go off to find the person responsible for their family member's death, and to get their revenge as well.

== Cast ==
- David Carradine as Jim Roth
- Lee Van Cleef as Burt Roth
- Mako as Akira Tanaka
- Lois Hamilton as Sara Roth
- David Goss as Clay Roth
- Brent Huff as Tommy Roth
- Ross Hagen as Cory Thorton
- Michael Berryman as F.C., Tanaka's Right Hand Man / Sidekick
- Dick Miller as Steve, 1st Bandit
- Burr DeBenning as Lieutenant Sanderson
- Cary-Hiroyuki Tagawa as Toshi, Member of Tanaka's Gang
