= Bullseye! (1990 film) =

1990 British action comedy

- Promotional release poster
- Directed by: Michael Winner
- Written by: Leslie Bricusse; Laurence Marks; Maurice Gran; Nick Mead; Michael Winner
- Produced by: Menahem Golan; Michael Winner
- Starring: Michael Caine; Roger Moore; Sally Kirkland
- Cinematography: Alan Jones
- Edited by: Terry Rawlings
- Music by: John Du Prez
- Production company: 21st Century Film Corporation
- Distributed by: 21st Century Film Corporation
- Release date: 2 November 1990
- Running time: 95 minutes
- Country: United Kingdom
- Language: English
- Budget: US$15 million
- Box office: £100,626 (UK)

Bullseye! is a 1990 British–American action comedy film starring Michael Caine and Roger Moore. It was directed by Michael Winner. It was released on 2 November 1990, to mixed reviews, and was a box office disappointment. It has since developed a small cult following.

== Plot ==
Moore and Caine play dual roles – a pair of small-time con-men and a pair of inept nuclear physicists who believe they have invented a limitless supply of energy. The con men use their resemblance to the scientists to con their way into the scientists' safe deposit boxes and steal the formula, but in so doing, they become entangled in a shady world of spies and international intrigue. The film includes a number of cameo appearances, including Jenny Seagrove (Winner's partner at the time) playing two different roles, John Cleese, Patsy Kensit, Alexandra Pigg and Nicholas Courtney. The film also features Roger Moore's daughter, Deborah Moore (credited as Deborah Barrymore), in a supporting role.

== Cast ==
- Michael Caine as Sidney Lipton / Dr Daniel Hicklar
- Roger Moore as Gerald Bradley-Smith / Sir John Bavistock
- Sally Kirkland as Willie
- Lee Patterson as Darrell Hyde
- Deborah Moore as Flo Fleming (as Deborah Barrymore)
- Mark Burns as Nigel Holden
- Derren Nesbitt as Inspector Grosse
- Deborah Leng as Francesca
- Christopher Adamson as Death's Head
- Steffanie Pitt as Donna Dutch
- Angus MacKay as Reverend Simkin
- Nicholas Courtney as Sir Hugh
- Robert McBain as Lawyer
- John Woodnutt as Bank Manager
- Mildred Shay as Jolene (Tourist Wife)
- Helen Horton as Tourist on Coach
- Jeff Harding as Agent Merrow
- Gordon Honeycombe as TV Announcer
- Pamela Armstrong as TV Newsreader
- Kiran Shah as Little Boss at Auction
- John Cleese as Man on the Beach in Barbados Who Looks Like John Cleese
- Jenny Seagrove as Health Club Receptionist / Girl with John Cleese
- Patsy Kensit as Sick Lady on Train
- Alexandra Pigg as Car Hire Girl
- Deborah Bishop as Mr Moore's left eyebrow
- Jim Bowen as Himself
- Tony Green as Himself
- Cliff Lazarenko as Celebrity Dart Thrower
- John Scott Martin as Old Jeweller
- John Lyons as Train Guard

== Reception ==
The Radio Times Guide to Films' review of Bullseye! states: "this appallingly unfunny comedy is a career low for all concerned".

== Release and home video ==
This film has been released on several countries theatrically and later on VHS by RCA/Columbia Pictures Home Video. The film is available on the made-on-demand DVD-R service from MGM Home Entertainment through 20th Century Fox.
