= Born to Fight (1989 film) =

- Directed by: Bruno Mattei
- Written by: Claudio Fragasso
- Produced by: Franco Gaudenzi
- Starring: Brent Huff; John van Dreelen; Werner Pochath
- Cinematography: Richard Grassetti
- Edited by: Bruno Mattei
- Music by: Al Festa
- Distributed by: Variety Distribution
- Release date: July 17, 1989 (Portugal)
- Running time: 85 minutes
- Country: Italy
- Languages: English; Italian

Born to Fight (Italian: Nato per combattere) is a 1989 action film, starring Brent Huff, John van Dreelen, Werner Pochath and Mary Stavin. The film was shot in the Philippines due to low budget in 1988 and is the third time − after Strike Commando 2 (1988) and Cop Game (1988) − when Brent Huff worked with director Bruno Mattei.

== Plot ==
Super tough Vietnam War veteran Sam Wood (Huff) is a survivor of a vicious prison camp where he was brutally and painfully tortured before finally managing to escape. When Wood returns to rescue his friends, he finds that they are already dead. Some time later, a woman named Maryline Kane (Stavin) offers him a tremendous amount of money if he will accompany her back to the area where the prison camp was to do interviews for a documentary story. It all turns out to be a lie − her father is now a prisoner in the camp, and she knows that only a man like Wood can help set him free. Sam adopts a proposal, but the situation is much more complicated, because the camp is now run by his old nemesis Duan Loc (Pochath).

== Cast ==
- Brent Huff as Sam Wood
- Werner Pochath as Duan Loc
- Romano Puppo as Alex Bross
- John van Dreelen as Gen. Weber
- Mary Stavin as Maryline Kane
- Don Wilson (IV) as Gen. Weber's Aide
- Claudio Fragasso (as Clyde Anderson) as one of the prisoners
