= Romulus and the Sabines (1961 film) =

- Directed by: Richard Pottier
- Written by: Edoardo Anton
- Produced by: Films Matignon
- Starring: Roger Moore; Mylène Demongeot; Jean Marais
- Music by: Carlo Rustichelli
- Release dates: 15 November 1961 (Italy); 15 December 1961 (France)
- Running time: 98 minutes
- Countries: Italy; France; Yugoslavia
- Languages: French; Italian; English

Il ratto delle sabine (English: The Rape of the Sabines) is an Italian adventure comedy film from 1961, directed by Richard Pottier, written by Edoardo Anton, starring Mylène Demongeot, Roger Moore and Jean Marais. The scenario was based on a novel of André Castelot. The film was also known under the title "L'Enlèvement des Sabines" (France), "Il ratto delle sabine" (Italy), "Les femmes de Sabine" (Canada, French title), "Der Raub der Sabinerinnen " (West Germany), "El rapto de las sabinas" (Spain), "Romulus and the Sabines" (USA), "O Rapto das Sabinas" (Portugal).

== Cast ==
- Mylène Demongeot: Rea
- Roger Moore: Romulus
- Francis Blanche: Mezio
- Jean Marais: Mars
- Scilla Gabel: Dusia
- Folco Lulli: King Titus Tatius
- Rosanna Schiaffino: Venus
- Giorgia Moll: Lavinia
- Claude Conty: Tarquinius Albus
- Luisa Mattioli: Silvia
- Marino Masé: Lino
- Walter Barnes: Stilicone
- Nietta Zocchi: Queen Hersilia
- Franco Albina: Lepico
- Petar Dobric: Numa Pompilius
- Dada Gallotti: Flaminia
- Mariangela Giordano: Domizia
- Dina De Santis: Albina

== See also ==
- The Rape of the Sabine Women
