= Brent Huff =

American film director, actor and model

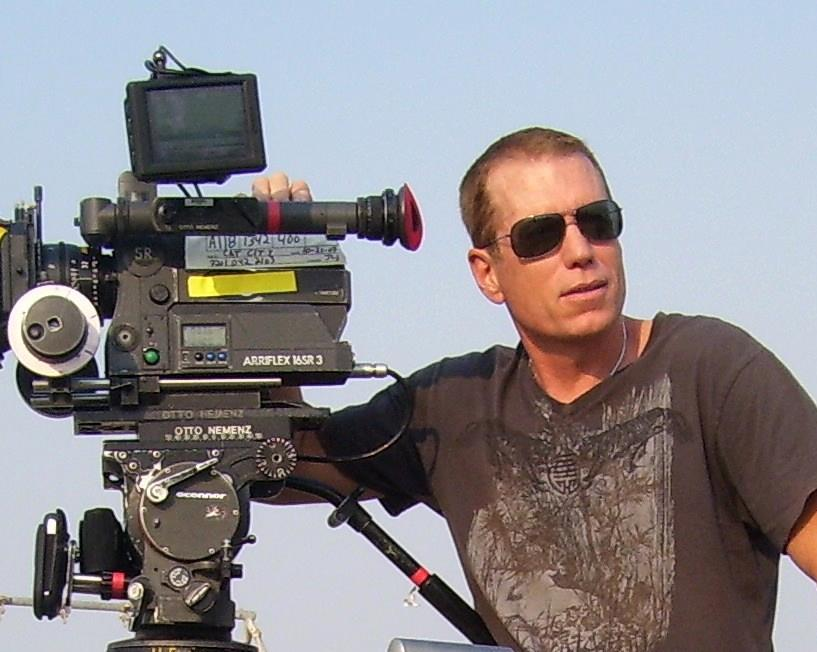
- Brent Huff directing Cat City, on location in 2007.
- Born: March 11, 1961 (age 65); Springfield, Missouri, USA
- Years active: 1976–present
- Spouse: Shawn Huff
- Children: 1

Brent Huff (born March 11, 1961, in Springfield, Missouri) is an American actor, writer, director and former model. He is best known for his recurring role as Officer Smitty in the ABC dramas The Rookie and The Rookie: Feds. Huff has also had recurring roles in Shameless, Pensacola: Wings of Gold and Black Scorpion, with additional appearances in Mad Men, The West Wing, NCIS, JAG and Cold Case. Duff is married to his wife Shawn and they have one daughter.

In addition to acting, Huff has written and directed feature films and documentaries including The Jackie Stiles Story, It's a Rockabilly World, Cat City, Chasing Beauty, Welcome to Paradise, A Genie's Tail and 100 Mile Rule.

== Career ==
Huff grew up in Springfield, Missouri, and attended Kickapoo High School. He was later inducted into the Kickapoo Theatre Hall of Fame. He studied theater at the University of Missouri. Huff worked as a fashion model represented by Ford Models in New York City and Fashion Models in Milan. During his modeling career, he worked with designers Gianni Versace, Giorgio Armani, Valentino and Calvin Klein.

Huff began acting in film during the 1980s, appearing primarily in action and genre productions including Nine Deaths of the Ninja, Armed Response and Strike Commando 2. His work frequently involved international productions filmed in countries including South Africa, the Philippines, Thailand, Austria, France, Italy, Argentina, Russia, Serbia and Romania.

Huff later studied acting in both New York City and Los Angeles while continuing work in film and television. In 2018, he returned to recurring television roles with appearances on the Showtime series Shameless.

=== Directing ===
In addition to acting, Huff developed a career as a director, writer and documentary filmmaker. His documentary Chasing Beauty explored issues within the fashion and modeling industries, including body image, exploitation and industry pressure.

Huff later directed The Jackie Stiles Story, a documentary chronicling the life and basketball career of Jackie Stiles. The film premiered in Springfield, Missouri, in 2022.

== Filmography ==
=== Film ===
Year	Title	Role
1978	Coach	Bulldog Malone
1984	The Perils of Gwendoline in the Land of the Yik-Yak	Willard
1985	Nine Deaths of the Ninja	Steve Gordon
1985	Deadly Passion	Joey
1985	Summer Fantasy	Scott
1986	Armed Response	Clay Adams
1987	Stormquest	Joxer
1988	Cop Game	Tony
1988	Strike Commando 2	Michael Ransom
1989	Born to Fight	Shane
1990	After the Condor	Derek
1992	Falling from Grace	Matt
1993	Veterinarian Christine	Tom
1993	Hunt for the Blue Diamond	Mike Reno
1993	At the Edge of Paradise	Richard
1995	The Black Curse	Jack
1995	Tinkercrank	Matt
1996	Oblivion 2: Backlash	Sweeney
1996	Scorpio One	Lt. Redding
1997	The Bad Pack	Lt. James
1997	Dead Tides	Mick
1998	Girls' Night	Kevin
1999	Hitman's Run	Det. Delaney
1999	Hijack	Jack Bryant
2000	Hot Boyz	Det. Bentley
2000	Submerged	Capt. Evans
2000	Beautiful	Trevor
2003	Bad Bizness	Frank Wilson
2003	Final Examination	Sheriff Davis
2005	Glass Trap	Dean Rader
2006	Dead and Deader	Dr. Scott
2009	Breaking Point	Frank
2010	Kill Speed	Ted
2011	Second Chance	Michael
2012	Attack of the 50 Foot Cheerleader	Coach Walsh
2012	Forgetting Regret	David
2015	D-TEC	Marcus Reed
2016	Killing Lazarus	Detective Shaw
2016	Christmas Trade	Greg
2019	Tyson's Run	Coach Fickman
2022	Deadly Draw	Sheriff Grady
2022	A Genie's Tail	Mr. Campbell
2024	Valley Circle	Frank

=== Television ===
Year	Title	Role
1994	I Spy Returns	Lt. Stevens
1994	Diagnosis: Murder	Dr. Jeff Martin
1996	Dark Skies	Agent Collins
1996	Diagnosis: Murder	Sgt. Keller
1997	Hollywood Confidential	Detective Harris
1998–1999	Pensacola: Wings of Gold	Capt. James "Bobo" Gallow
2000	JAG	Commander Pike
2001	Black Scorpion	Lt. Marsh
2003	Cold Case	Lonnie Gable
2003	Lucky	Dr. Connelly
2004	The West Wing	Agent Broder
2010	Mad Men	General Frank Alvin
2013	NCIS	Rick Cameron
2017	Ghostbusters: Station 6	Mayor Collins
2018–2019	Shameless	Troy
2018–present	The Rookie	Officer Quigley Smitty
2022–2023	The Rookie: Feds	Officer Quigley Smitty

=== Director ===
Year	Title	Notes
1994	We the People	Feature film
1997	The Bad Pack	Feature film
2002	100 Mile Rule	Feature film
2007	Welcome to Paradise	Feature film
2007	Treasure Raiders	Feature film
2009	Serbian Scars	Feature film
2010	Behind the Orange Curtain	Documentary
2010	Cat City	Feature film
2010	Last Will	Feature film
2012	Hero	Short film
2012	Helpless	Short film
2013	Chasing Beauty	Documentary
2016	It's a Rockabilly World	Documentary
2021	Creating Giants	Documentary
2022	The Jackie Stiles Story	Documentary
2022	A Genie's Tail	Feature film
