= Roger Moore =

English actor (1927–2017)

Sir Roger Moore KBE
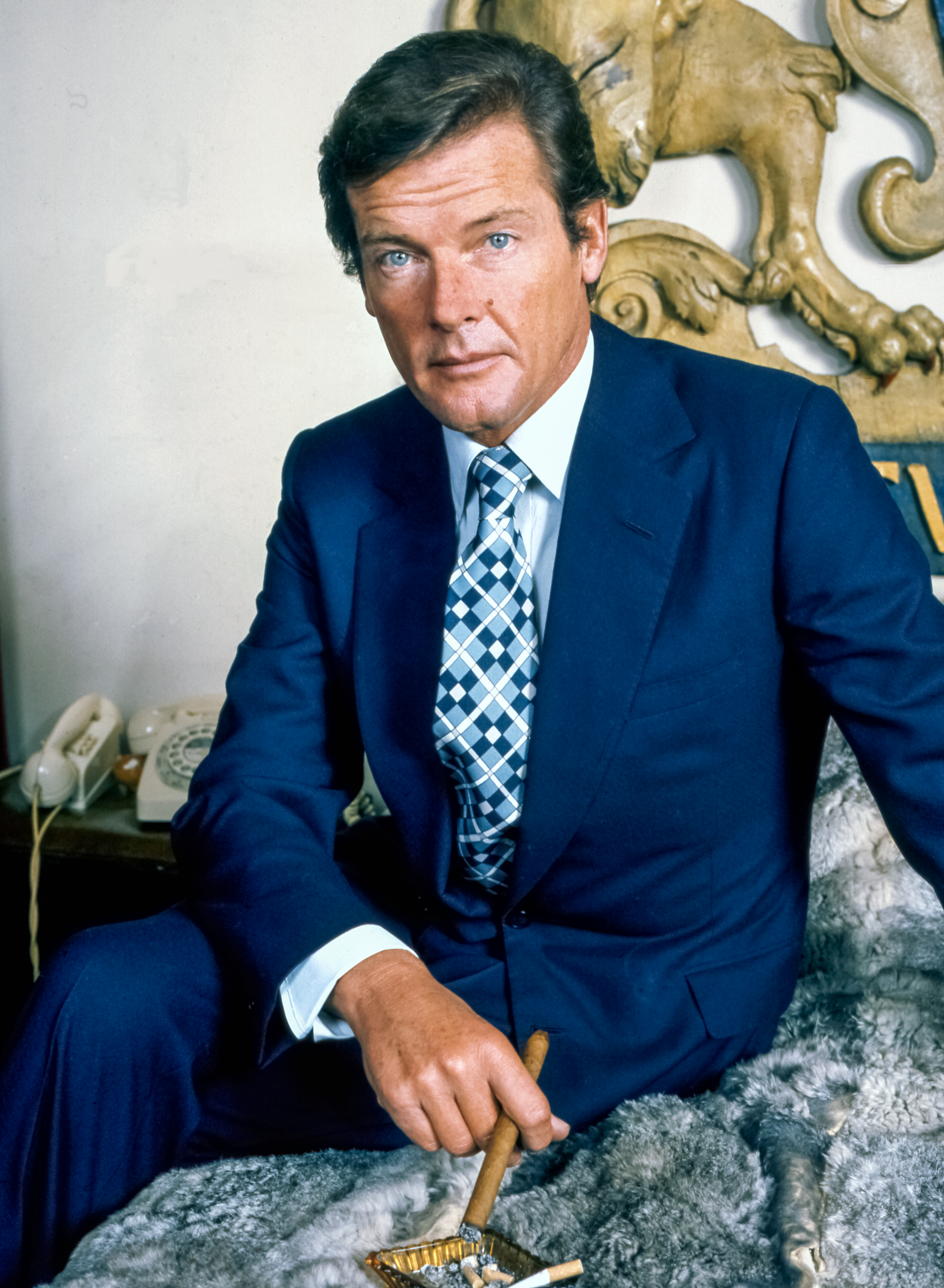
- Moore in 1973
- Born: 14 October 1927; Stockwell, London, England
- Died: 23 May 2017 (aged 89); Crans-Montana, Switzerland
- Burial place: Monaco Cemetery
- Education: Royal Academy of Dramatic Art; (RADA)
- Occupation: Actor
- Years active: 1944–2017
- Known for: James Bond from 1973 to 1985; The Saint from 1962 to 1969
- Spouses: Doorn van Steyn (m. 1946; div. 1953); Dorothy Squires (m. 1953; div. 1968); Luisa Mattioli (m. 1969; div. 2000); Kristina Tholstrup (m. 2002)
- Children: 3, including Deborah Moore

Sir Roger George Moore (14 October 1927 – 23 May 2017) was an English actor. He was the third actor to portray Ian Fleming's fictional secret agent James Bond in the Eon Productions/Metro-Goldwyn-Mayer film series, playing the character in seven feature films: Live and Let Die (1973), The Man with the Golden Gun (1974), The Spy Who Loved Me (1977), Moonraker (1979), For Your Eyes Only (1981), Octopussy (1983) and A View to a Kill (1985). Moore's seven appearances as Bond are the most of any actor in the Eon-produced entries.

On television, Moore played the lead role of Simon Templar, the title character in the British mystery thriller series The Saint (1962–1969). He played Beau Maverick in the American Western series Maverick (1960–1961), replacing James Garner as the lead, and starred with Tony Curtis in the action-comedy The Persuaders! (1971–1972). Continuing to act in the decades after his retirement from the Bond franchise, Moore's final appearance was in a pilot for a new Saint series that became a 2017 television film.

Moore was appointed a UNICEF Goodwill Ambassador in 1991 and was knighted by Queen Elizabeth II in 2003 for services to charity. In 2007, he received a star on the Hollywood Walk of Fame for his contributions to the film industry. He was made a Commander of the Order of Arts and Letters by the French government in 2008.

== Early life ==
Roger George Moore was born on 14 October 1927 in Stockwell, London. He was the only child of George Alfred Moore (1904–1997), a Metropolitan Police officer based at Bow Street in central London, and Lillian "Lily" Pope (1904–1986). His mother was born in Calcutta, India, to an English family. He attended Battersea Grammar School, but was evacuated to Holsworthy in Devon during the Second World War, and attended Launceston College in Cornwall. He was further educated at Dr Challoner's Grammar School in Amersham, Buckinghamshire.

Moore was apprenticed to an animation studio, but he was sacked after he made a mistake with some animation cels. When his father investigated a robbery at the home of the film director Brian Desmond Hurst, Moore was introduced to the director and hired as an extra for the 1945 film Caesar and Cleopatra. While there, Moore attracted an off-camera female fan following, and Hurst decided to pay Moore's fees at the Royal Academy of Dramatic Art. Moore spent three terms at RADA, where he was a classmate of his future Bond co-star Lois Maxwell, the original Miss Moneypenny. During his time there, he developed the relaxed demeanour that became his screen persona. He graduated from RADA in 1945.

At 18, shortly after the end of the Second World War, Moore was conscripted for national service. On 21 September 1946, he was commissioned into the Royal Army Service Corps as a second lieutenant. He was an officer in the Combined Services Entertainment section, eventually becoming a captain commanding a small depot in West Germany, where he looked after entertainers for the armed forces passing through Hamburg.

== Career ==
=== Early work (1945–1953) ===
Moore made his professional debut in Alexander Korda's Perfect Strangers (1945) alongside actors Robert Donat, Deborah Kerr, and Glynis Johns. Other early uncredited appearances include Caesar and Cleopatra (1945), Gaiety George, Piccadilly Incident (both 1946), and Trottie True (1949), in which he appeared alongside an uncredited Christopher Lee (both actors being cast by Brian Desmond Hurst as stage-door Johnnies).

In his book Last Man Standing: Tales from Tinseltown, Moore states that his first television appearance was on 27 March 1949 in The Governess by Patrick Hamilton, a live broadcast (as usual in that era), in which he played the minor part of Bob Drew. Other actors in the show included Clive Morton and Betty Ann Davies. He had uncredited parts in films including Paper Orchid and The Interrupted Journey (both 1949). He was in the one-off programme Drawing-Room Detective on BBC TV (1950) and appeared in the films One Wild Oat and Honeymoon Deferred (both 1951).

In the early 1950s, Moore worked as a model, appearing in print advertisements in the UK for knitwear (earning him the nickname "The Big Knit") and a wide range of other products such as toothpaste.

Moore travelled to the United States and began to work in television. He appeared in adaptations of Julius Caesar and Black Chiffon, and in two episodes of Robert Montgomery Presents, as well as the TV movie The Clay of Kings (all 1953).

=== MGM (1954–1956) ===
In March 1954, MGM signed Moore to a seven-year contract. He started his MGM contract with a small role in The Last Time I Saw Paris (1954), flirting with Elizabeth Taylor. He appeared in Interrupted Melody, a biographical movie about opera singer Marjorie Lawrence's recovery from polio, in which he was billed third under Glenn Ford and Eleanor Parker as Lawrence's brother Cyril. That same year, he played a supporting role in the swashbuckler The King's Thief starring Ann Blyth, Edmund Purdom, David Niven and George Sanders.

In the 1956 film Diane, Moore was billed third again, this time under Lana Turner and Pedro Armendariz, in a 16th-century period piece set in France with Moore playing Prince Henri, the future king. Moore was released from his MGM contract after two years following the film's critical and commercial failure. In his own words: "At MGM, RGM [Roger George Moore] was NBG [no bloody good]."

Moore then freelanced for a time, appearing in episodes of Ford Star Jubilee (1956), Lux Video Theatre (1957) and Matinee Theatre (1957).

=== Ivanhoe (1958–1959) ===
Moore's first success was playing the eponymous hero, Sir Wilfred of Ivanhoe, in the 1958–59 series Ivanhoe, a loose adaptation of the 1819 romantic novel by Sir Walter Scott set in the 12th century during the era of Richard the Lionheart, delving into Ivanhoe's conflict with Prince John. Shot mainly in England at Elstree Studios and Buckinghamshire, some of the show was also filmed in California owing to a partnership with Columbia Studios' Screen Gems. Aimed at younger audiences, the pilot was filmed in colour, a reflection of its comparatively high budget for a British children's adventure series of the period, but subsequent episodes were shot in black and white. Christopher Lee and John Schlesinger were among the show's guest stars, and series regulars included Robert Brown (who in the 1980s played M in several James Bond films) as the squire Gurth, Peter Gilmore as Waldo Ivanhoe, Andrew Keir as villainous Prince John, and Bruce Seton as noble King Richard. Moore suffered broken ribs and a battle-axe blow to his helmet while performing some of his own stunts filming a season of 39 half-hour episodes, and later reminisced, "I felt a complete Charlie riding around in all that armour and damned stupid plumed helmet. I felt like a medieval fireman."

=== Warner Bros. (1959–1961) ===
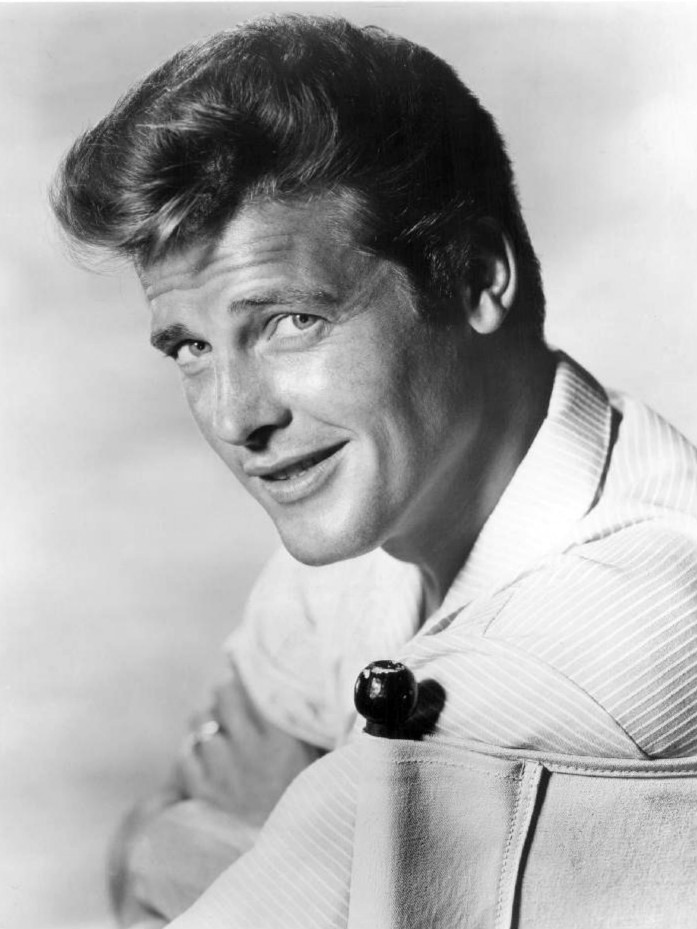
Moore in 1960

After that, Moore spent a few years mainly doing one-shot parts in television series, including an episode of Alfred Hitchcock Presents in 1959 titled "The Avon Emeralds". He signed another long-term contract to a studio, this time to Warner Bros.

In 1959, he took the lead role in The Miracle, a version of the play Das Mirakel for Warner Bros. showcasing Carroll Baker as a nun. The part had been turned down by Dirk Bogarde. That same year, Moore was directed by Arthur Hiller in "The Angry Young Man", an episode of the television series The Third Man starring Michael Rennie as the criminal mastermind Harry Lime, the role portrayed by Orson Welles in the film version.

==== The Alaskans (1959–1960) ====
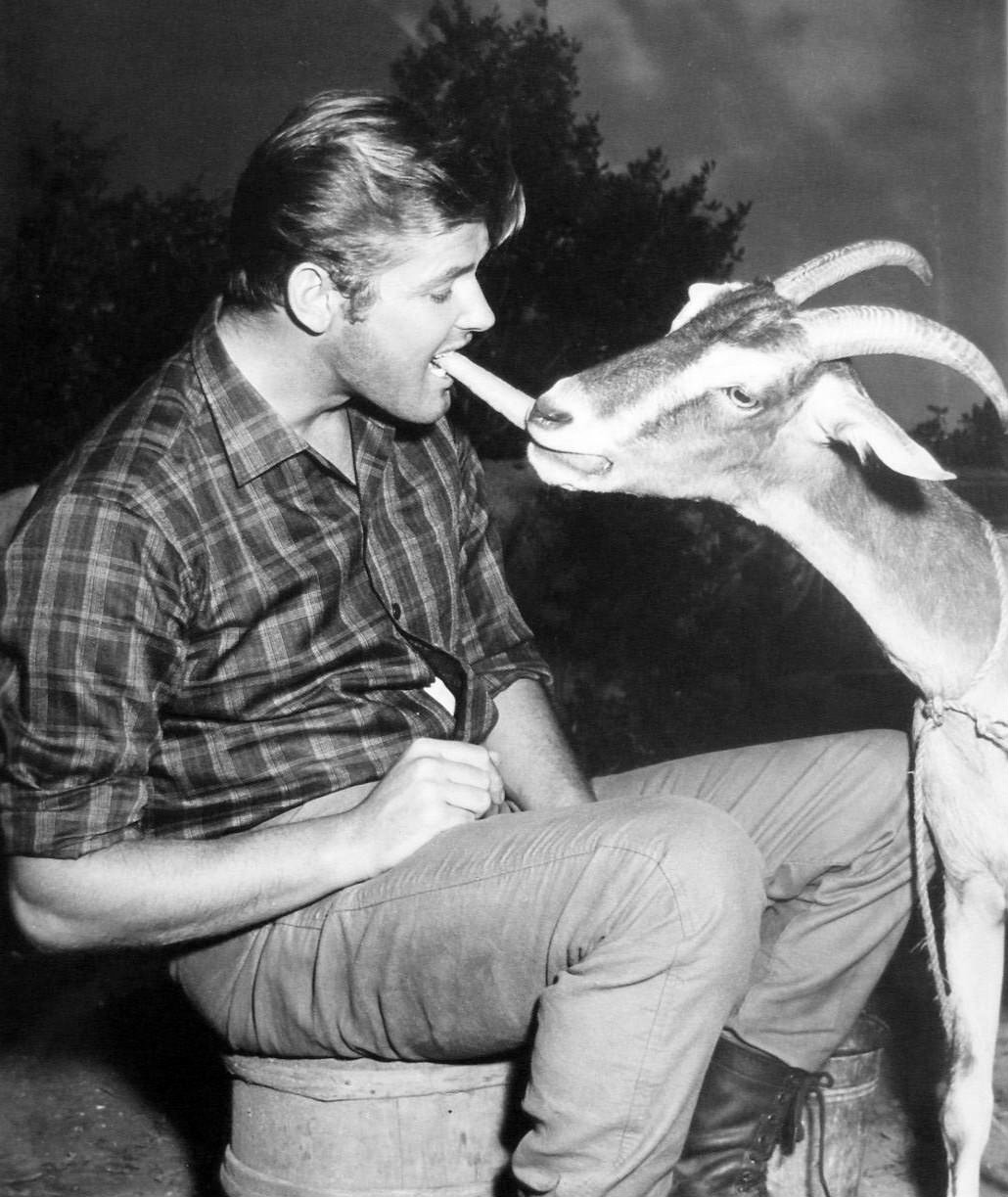
Moore in The Alaskans

Moore's next television series involved playing the lead as "Silky" Harris for the ABC/Warner Bros. 1959–60 Western The Alaskans, with co-stars Dorothy Provine as Rocky, Jeff York as Reno, and Ray Danton as Nifty. The show ran for a single season of 37 hour-long episodes on Sunday nights. Though set in Skagway, Alaska, with a focus on the Klondike Gold Rush around 1896, the series was filmed in the hot studio lot at Warner Bros. in Hollywood with the cast costumed in fur coats and hats. Moore found the work highly taxing, and his off-camera affair with Provine complicated matters even more. Moore later referred to the experience as his "most appalling television series."

He subsequently appeared as the questionable character "14 Karat John" in the two-part episode "Right Off the Boat" of the ABC/WB crime drama The Roaring 20s—alongside Rex Reason, John Dehner, Gary Vinson, and Dorothy Provine—appearing in a similar role but with a different character name.

==== Maverick (1960–1961) ====
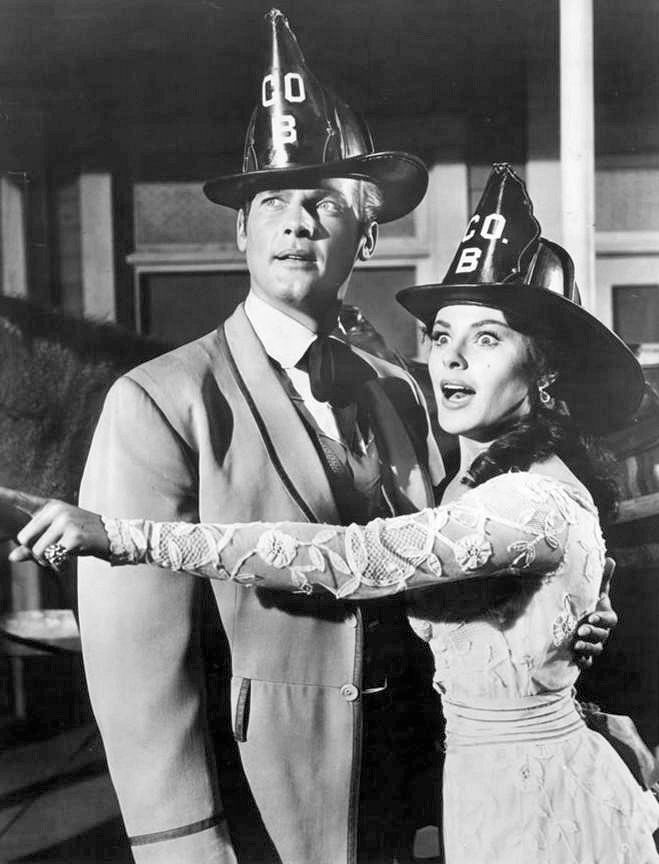
Moore and Kathleen Crowley in Maverick.

In the wake of The Alaskans, Moore was cast as Beau Maverick, an English-accented cousin of frontier gamblers Bret Maverick (James Garner), Bart Maverick (Jack Kelly), and Brent Maverick (Robert Colbert) in the much more successful ABC/WB Western series Maverick.

Moore appeared as the character in 14 episodes after Garner had left the series at the end of the previous season, wearing some of Garner's costumes; while filming The Alaskans, he had already recited much of Garner's dialogue, for the Alaskan series frequently recycled Maverick scripts, changing only the names and locales. He had also filmed a Maverick episode with Garner two seasons earlier, in which Moore played a different character, in a retooling of Richard Brinsley Sheridan's 1775 comedy of manners play The Rivals. In the course of the story, Moore and Garner's characters switched names on a bet, with Moore consequently identifying himself as "Bret Maverick" through most of the episode.

Moore's debut as Beau Maverick occurred in the first episode of the 1960–61 fourth season, "The Bundle from Britain", one of four episodes in which he shared screen time with his cousin Bart (Jack Kelly). Robert Altman wrote and directed "Bolt from the Blue", an episode featuring Will Hutchins as a frontier lawyer similar to his character in the series Sugarfoot, and "Red Dog" found Beau mixed up with the vicious bank robbers Lee Van Cleef and John Carradine. Kathleen Crowley was Moore's leading lady in two episodes ("Bullet for the Teacher" and "Kiz"), and others included Mala Powers, Roxane Berard, Fay Spain, Merry Anders, Andra Martin and Jeanne Cooper. Upon leaving the series, Moore cited a decline in script quality since the Garner era as the key factor in his decision to depart; ratings for the show were also down. Moore was originally slated to appear with both Jack Kelly and Robert Colbert in the series but by the time Colbert starred in his first episode, Moore had already left the series. Numerous early publicity stills of Kelly, Moore and Colbert posing together exist, however.

Moore was still under contract with Warners, who cast him in The Sins of Rachel Cade (1961), making love to a nun played by Angie Dickinson, and Gold of the Seven Saints (1961), supporting Clint Walker. He also went to Italy to make the adventure comedy Romulus and the Sabines (1961).

=== The Saint (1962–1969) ===
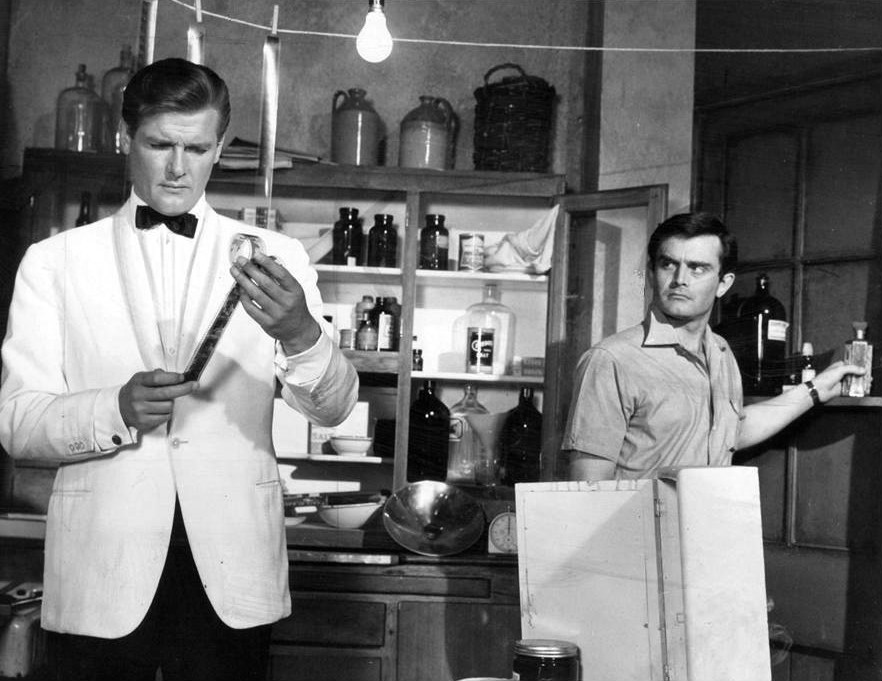
Roger Moore (left) with Earl Green in The Saint.

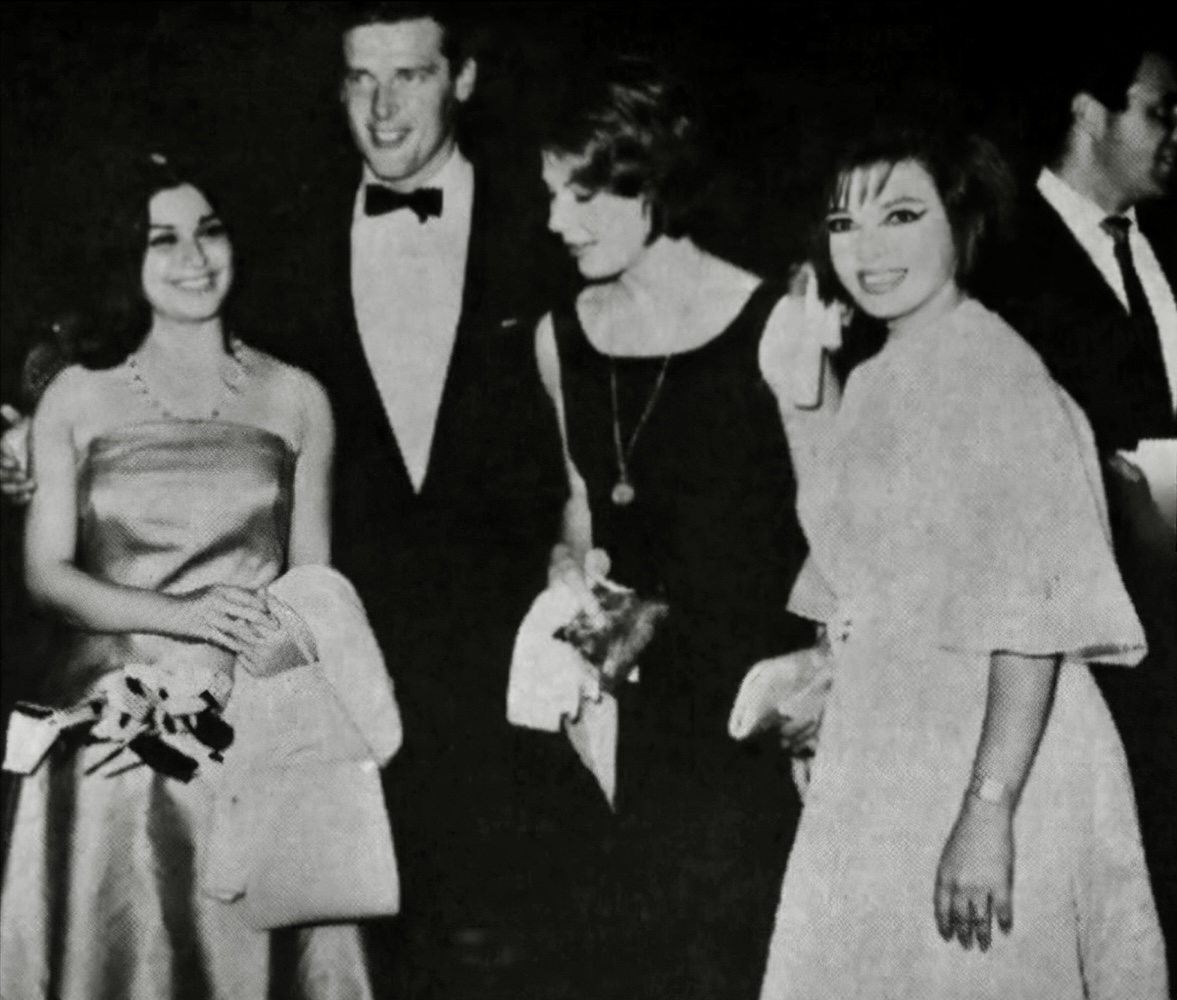
Moore posing with Egyptian actresses; Soad Hosny (first from left), Shwikar (second from right) and Sharifa Fadel at the Alexandria Television Festival in Alexandria, Egypt, August 1963.

Lew Grade cast Moore as Simon Templar in a new adaptation of The Saint, based on the novels by Leslie Charteris. Moore said in an interview in 1963 that he wanted to buy the rights to Leslie Charteris's character and the trademarks. The television series was broadcast by ITV in the UK between 1962 and 1969, and its overseas success made Moore a household name. After the strong performance in the US of the first two series in first-run syndication, NBC picked up the show in 1966. By early 1967, Moore had achieved international stardom. The series established his suave, quipping style which he carried forward to James Bond, and it also saw him exhibit his trademark raised eyebrow. Francis Blagburn in The Telegraph writes,

The raised eyebrow is perhaps the hardest facial gesture to perfect in the gentleman's arsenal. Get it right and you give the impression of someone who is in total control; get it wrong and you look like, well, Dwayne 'The Rock' Johnson (and no one wants that). Sir Roger wrote the book in how to raise an eyebrow... as Simon Templar, he coolly infers [sic] that he knows, and he knows that you know that he knows.

The Saint ran from 1962 for six series and 118 episodes. Moore went on to direct nine episodes of the later series, which moved into colour in 1967. Several episodes were edited together to form two films, The Saint and the Fiction Makers (1968) and Vendetta for the Saint (1969).

=== Post-Saint films and The Persuaders! (1969–1972) ===
He made two films immediately after the series ended: Crossplot (1969), a lightweight 'spy caper' movie, and the more challenging The Man Who Haunted Himself (1970). Directed by Basil Dearden, it gave Moore the opportunity to demonstrate greater versatility than the role of Simon Templar had allowed. In 2004, Moore said of The Man Who Haunted Himself: "It was one of the few times I was allowed to act... Many say my best role was in The Man Who Haunted Himself. Being a modest actor, I won't disagree." In one scene in the film, his character says "Espionage isn't all James Bond on Her Majesty's Secret Service."

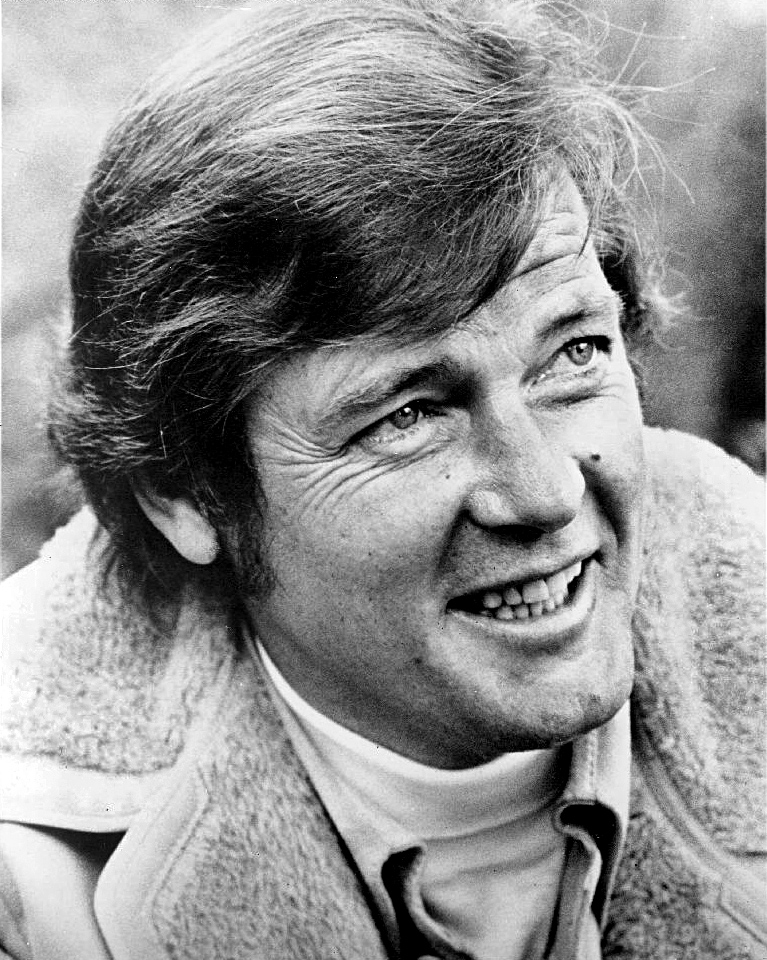
Moore in 1971

Lew Grade lured Moore to star alongside Tony Curtis in The Persuaders!. The show featured the adventures of two millionaire playboys across Europe. Moore was paid the then-unheard-of sum of £1 million for a single series, making him the highest-paid television actor in the world. Lew Grade claimed in his autobiography, Still Dancing, that Moore and Curtis "didn't hit it off all that well". Curtis refused to spend more time on set than was strictly necessary, while Moore was always willing to work overtime. According to the DVD commentary, neither Roger Moore, an uncredited co-producer, nor Robert S. Baker, the credited producer, ever had a contract other than a handshake with Lew Grade.

Despite its focus on the UK and US markets, The Persuaders! became more successful in other international markets. On its premiere on the ITV network, it was beaten in the ratings by repeats of Monty Python's Flying Circus on BBC One. It did however place in the Top 20 most-viewed television series in the UK throughout 1971. The lack of success in the US, where it had been sold to ABC, Curtis put down to its showing at the Saturday 10pm slot, but it was successful in continental Europe and Australia. In Germany, where the series was aired under the name Die Zwei ("The Two"), it became a hit through especially amusing dubbing which only barely used translations of the original dialogue.

=== James Bond era (1973–1985) ===
==== Moore as Bond ====
Moore's Bond was very different from the version created by Ian Fleming and the one portrayed by Connery. Screenwriters such as George MacDonald Fraser provided scenarios in which Moore was cast as a seasoned, debonair playboy who would always have a trick or gadget in stock when he needed it. This was designed to serve the contemporary taste of the 1970s. Moore's version of Bond was also known for his sense of humour and witty one liners; as Moore himself said: "My personality is different from previous Bonds. I'm not that cold-blooded-killer type. Which is why I play it mostly for laughs."

==== Live and Let Die (1973) ====
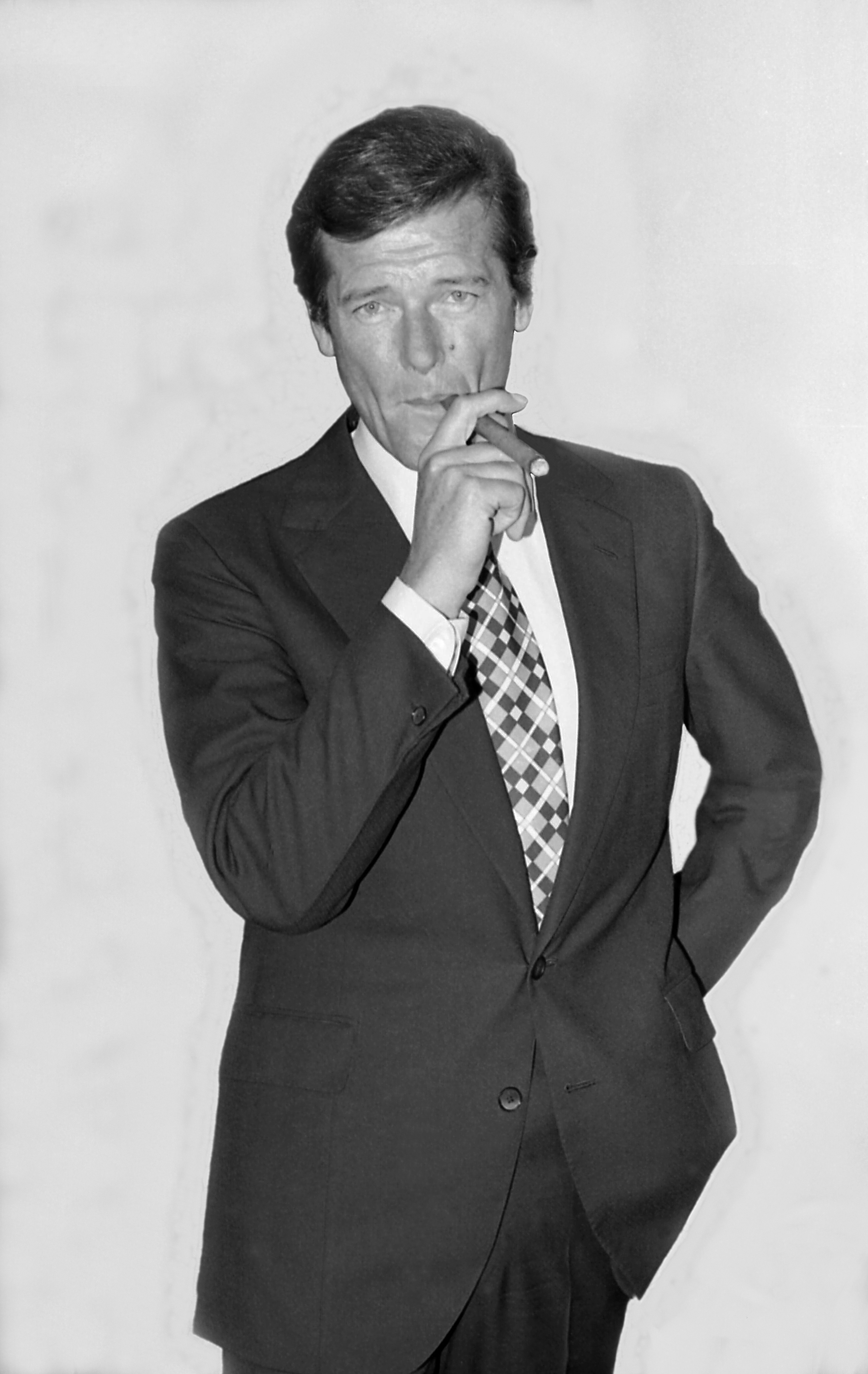
Moore in 1973

Due to his commitment to several television shows, in particular The Saint, Roger Moore was unavailable for the James Bond films for a considerable time. His participation in The Saint was as actor, producer, and director, and he also became involved in developing the series The Persuaders!. In 1964, he made a guest appearance as James Bond in the comedy series Mainly Millicent. Moore stated in his autobiography My Word Is My Bond (2008) that he had neither been approached to play the character in Dr. No, nor did he feel that he had ever been considered. Only after Sean Connery had declared in 1966 that he would not play Bond any longer did Moore become aware that he might be a contender for the role. After George Lazenby was cast in 1969's On Her Majesty's Secret Service and Connery was enticed back to the role of Bond again for Diamonds Are Forever (1971), Moore did not consider the possibility until it seemed clear that Connery had stepped down as Bond for good. With The Persuaders! having been cancelled following poor ratings in the US, Moore was approached, and he accepted producer Albert Broccoli's offer in August 1972. In his autobiography, Moore writes that he had to cut his hair and lose weight for the role. Although he resented having to make those changes, he was finally cast as James Bond in Live and Let Die (1973). Being 44 when he was cast in the role, Moore remains the oldest actor to portray Bond.

Moore then made Gold (1974), based on a novel by Wilbur Smith for producer Michael Klinger and director Peter R. Hunt. He was paid US$200,000 plus a percentage of the profits.

==== The Man with the Golden Gun (1974) ====
Moore made his second Bond film, The Man with the Golden Gun (1974), which was a hit, though less successful than Live and Let Die. It featured Christopher Lee as the main antagonist. Also appearing were Britt Ekland, Herve Villechaize and Maud Adams. He then made a comedy That Lucky Touch (1975) which was a box office disaster. Moore made an Italian-shot action film Street People (1976), then went back to South Africa for another Klinger-Hunt movie from a Wilbur Smith novel, Shout at the Devil (1976), which was successful in Britain, though less so in the US. Lee Marvin was a main cast member. Ian Holm was also featured, as well as Barbara Parkins.

==== The Spy Who Loved Me (1977) ====
Moore returned for a third outing as Bond in The Spy Who Loved Me (1977), which was a massive box-office success. It also starred Barbara Bach and Richard Kiel in his first appearance as the villain Jaws. He returned to South Africa for a third action movie shot there, The Wild Geese (1978), produced by Euan Lloyd and directed by Andrew V. McLaglen. It was a sizeable hit in Britain and Europe but, like Shout at the Devil, less so in the US. The cast featured Richard Burton, who had top billing, and Richard Harris.

Moore played the lead in Escape to Athena (1979) partly financed by Lew Grade. It was a heist adventure set in war-time Greece, and starred Telly Savalas and David Niven, and features mostly American character actors, including Elliott Gould, Stefanie Powers, Richard Roundtree, Sonny Bono, and Italian actress Claudia Cardinale. Roger Moore (with top billing) plays a charming former Austrian antiquities dealer turned crooked camp commandant, asked to guard Greek antiquities desired by the Third Reich, and also guard the collection of archaeologists who are being forced to work to find and recover these objects, but he has other plans for the treasure he guards and for the people under his watch.

==== Moonraker (1979) ====
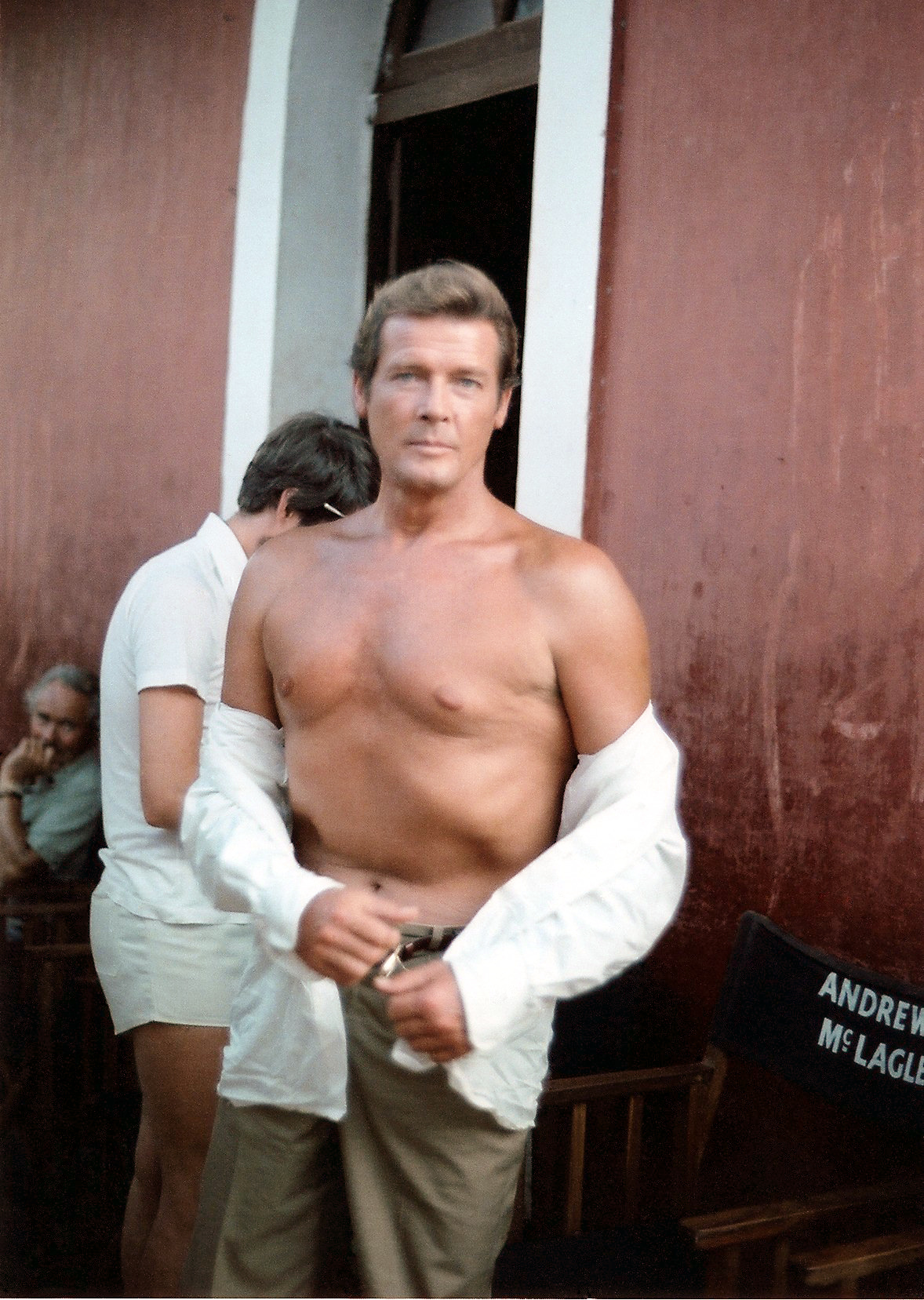
Roger Moore in 1979.

Moore followed the success of his fourth outing as Bond, Moonraker (1979), with an action film, North Sea Hijack (1980), also known as ffolkes. Moore played a very un-Bond-like hero, opposite Anthony Perkins. The film was a box-office disappointment.

Better received was The Sea Wolves (1980), another World War Two adventure, based on James Leasor's book, Boarding Party, which reunited many of the crew from The Wild Geese including Euan Lloyd and McLaglen. It was based on the true story of a March 1943 event in British India and Portuguese Goa, in which a group of retired members of the Calcutta Light Horse, colonelled by David Niven's character, assist regular British Army operatives, played by Moore and Gregory Peck, in destroying German ships in neutral Mormugao harbour, all the time surrounded by German spies and Indian nationalist intrigue. Trevor Howard, Patrick Macnee and Barbara Kellerman also co-star, with a who's-who lineup of British character actors.

Moore was in two all-star comedies: Sunday Lovers (1980), which flopped at the box office, and The Cannonball Run (1981), which was a hit. The latter featured an ensemble cast, including Jackie Chan, Burt Reynolds, Dean Martin, Dom DeLuise, Sammy Davis Jr, and Farrah Fawcett.

==== For Your Eyes Only (1981) ====
Moore returned for his fifth outing as Bond in For Your Eyes Only (1981).

==== Octopussy (1983) ====
Following the film For Your Eyes Only, Moore expressed a desire to leave the role, and other actors were screen tested, including James Brolin, but Moore was eventually enticed back for Octopussy (1983).

The circumstances around Octopussy's release were highly unusual, in that another James Bond film was being released in the same year. Spearheaded by Thunderball producer Kevin McClory (who retained the film rights to the property because the antecedent 1961 Ian Fleming novel was based on an unfilmed 1959 screenplay produced under the aegis of McClory, Jack Whittingham and Fleming), the non-Eon production Never Say Never Again featured his predecessor Sean Connery returning to the role of Bond. Although tantamount to a loose remake of Thunderball, it was not set in the continuity of the previous Eon Bond films. This led to the media dubbing the one-time situation the "Battle of the Bonds".

He made a cameo as Chief Inspector Clouseau, posing as a famous movie star, in Curse of the Pink Panther (1983) (for which he was credited as "Turk Thrust II"). Then, he tried a thriller The Naked Face (1984), written and directed by Bryan Forbes.

==== A View to a Kill (1985) ====
Moore starred in his final Bond film, A View to a Kill (1985). He was the oldest actor to have played Bond – he was 45 in Live and Let Die, and 58 when he announced his retirement on 3 December 1985, having played the part for over twelve years. With seven films, Moore holds the record for playing Bond the most times in the Eon series, but is tied with Sean Connery in number of times playing Bond when counting Connery's non-Eon appearance in Never Say Never Again (1983).

In 1987, he hosted Happy Anniversary 007: 25 Years of James Bond.

=== Post-James Bond career (1986–2017) ===
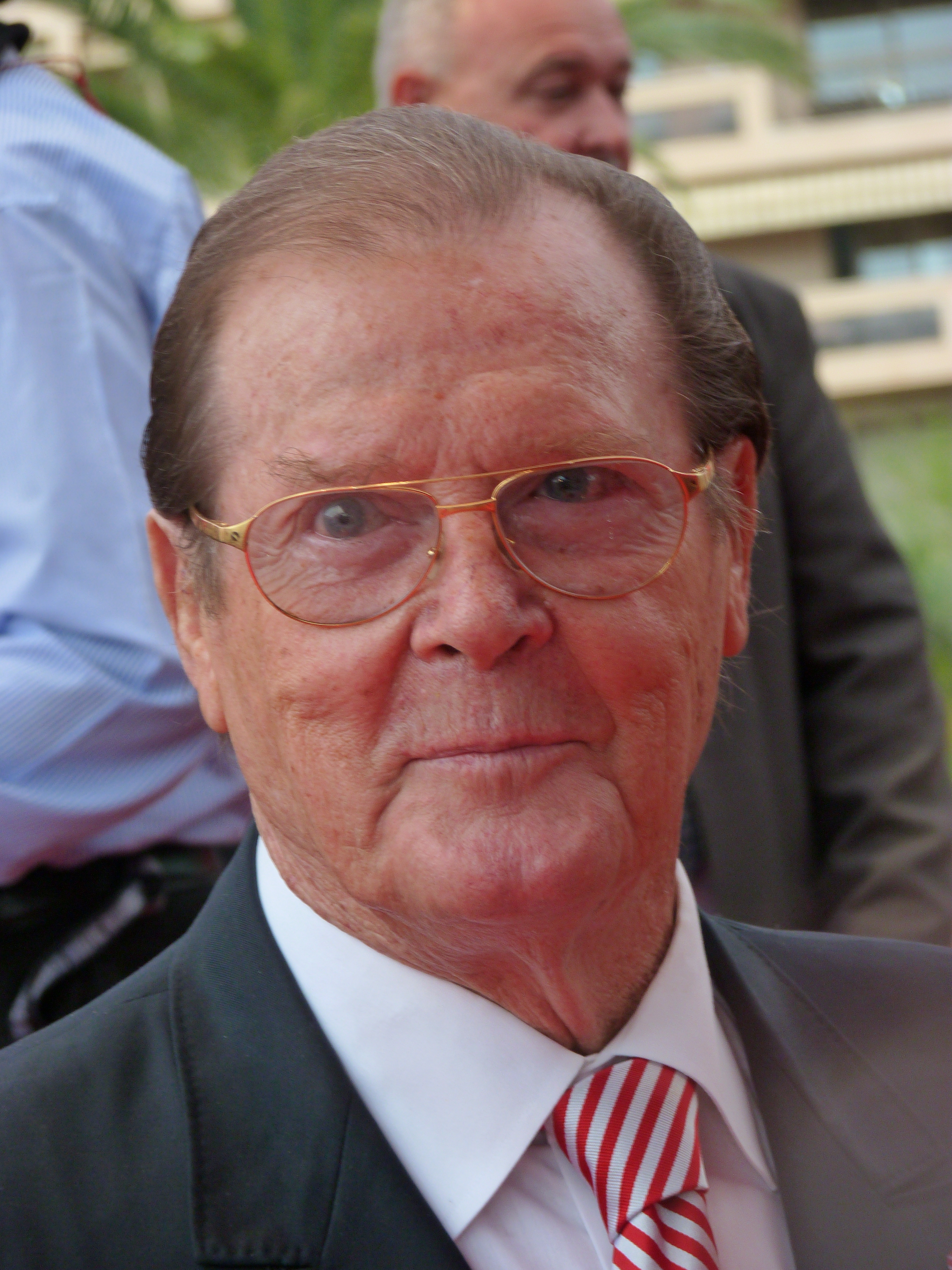
Moore in 2012.

Moore said, about his decision to leave the role of James Bond, that "It wasn't because of the physical stuff as I could still play tennis for two hours a day and do a one-hour workout every morning. Physically I was okay, but facially I started looking...well, the leading ladies were young enough to be my granddaughter and it becomes disgusting." In his personal opinion, he looked too old to be "hanging around women in their early twenties without it appearing creepy." Moore did not act on screen for five years after he stopped playing Bond; in 1990, he appeared in several films, as well as in the writer-director Michael Feeney Callan's television series My Riviera. He then starred in the film Bed & Breakfast, which was shot in 1989; and also had a large role in the 1996 film The Quest. In 1997, he starred as the Chief in Spice World. At the age of 73, he played a flamboyant homosexual man in Boat Trip (2002) with Cuba Gooding Jr.

The British satirical puppet show Spitting Image had a sketch in which their latex likeness of Moore, when asked to display emotions by an offscreen director, did nothing but raise an eyebrow; Moore himself stated that he thought the sketch was funny and took it in good humour. Indeed, he had always embraced the "eyebrows" gag wholeheartedly, and quipped that he "only had three expressions as Bond: right eyebrow raised, left eyebrow raised, and eyebrows crossed when grabbed by Jaws". Spitting Image continued the joke, featuring a Bond film spoof, The Man with the Wooden Delivery, with Moore's puppet receiving orders from Margaret Thatcher to kill Mikhail Gorbachev. Other comedy shows at that time ridiculed Moore's acting, with Rory Bremner once claiming to have had a death threat from one of his irate fans following one such routine.

In a nod to his 1960s TV show, Moore had a vocal cameo in The Saint (1997) as a radio newsreader as Simon Templar drives away at the end of the film. In the year 2000, he played the role of a secret agent in the Christmas special Victoria Wood with All the Trimmings, shown on BBC One on Christmas Day. Filming all his scenes in the London Eye, his mission was to eliminate another agent whose file photo looks like Pierce Brosnan. In 2002, he had a small cameo role in the German police procedural series Tatort (episode 506: "Schatten" – "Shadow", 28 July 2002) as himself signing an autograph on a Unicef card.

In the 1981 film The Cannonball Run, in a parody of both himself and James Bond, Moore played Seymour Goldfarb, a wealthy but delusional playboy who believes himself to be Roger Moore and enters the race driving an Aston Martin DB5.

In support of his charitable work for UNICEF, Moore lent his voice to the character of the magic snowman, Lumi Ukko, for a 1990 feature film produced by Pavlina Ltd/FIT. The film is UNICEF-endorsed and is dedicated to the "world's children". An audiobook titled The Magic Snowman and The Rusty Ice Skates features his voice. His daughter, the actress Deborah Moore, narrated the book in honour of her father's legacy and his work for UNICEF. 20 per cent of the book's proceeds are pledged to the organisation.

In 2009, Moore appeared in an advertisement for the Post Office. In 2010, he provided the voice of a talking cat called Lazenby in the film Cats & Dogs: The Revenge of Kitty Galore, which contained several references to, and parodies of, Bond films. In 2011, he co-starred in the film A Princess for Christmas with Katie McGrath and Sam Heughan and, in 2012, he took to the stage for a series of seven Evenings with in UK theatres; in November, guest-hosted Have I Got News for You. A slightly thinner-faced Moore contributed to a charity song in 2017. His last on-screen performance was in 2017, a brief appearance near the end of the remake of The Saint.

In 2015, Moore was named one of GQ's 50 best-dressed British men. In 2015, he read Hans Christian Andersen's "The Princess and the Pea" for the children's fairy tales app GivingTales in aid of UNICEF.

== Advocacy ==
=== Humanitarian work ===
Moore's friend Audrey Hepburn had impressed him with her work for UNICEF, and consequently he became a UNICEF Goodwill Ambassador in August 1991. His character, Simon Templar, made a pitch for UNICEF near the end of "The Revolution Racket", airing on 5 November 1964. He was the voice of Father Christmas or 'Santa' in the 2004 UNICEF cartoon The Fly Who Loved Me. In February 2009 and 2010, Moore participated in the Eilat Chamber Music Festival in Israel, where he narrated Saint-Saëns’s Carnival of the Animals and donated the proceeds from his performance to the Jerusalem AIDS Project to support the training of medical practitioners in Swaziland in HIV prevention.

=== Animal welfare ===
Moore was an active proponent of animal welfare causes, particularly in his later life. He worked prolifically alongside PETA in campaigning against foie gras, narrating short exposés in 2006 and 2012, as well as appearing in ad campaigns, some of which he personally funded. He also wrote columns in various publications, and directly to politicians and businesses, regarding the issue. For his efforts, he was named PETA UK Person of the Year in 2009. The campaign against Selfridges successfully prompted them to discontinue sales in 2009, while another British company (Creek Projects Investments) shuttered plans to build a large foie gras facility in China in 2012, in response to Moore's advocacy.

Moore also voiced concern for issues of wild animal welfare. He publicly raised awareness regarding the living conditions of Morgan, a wild-caught killer whale who had been taken into captivity, as well as successfully leading the campaign to ban the use of wild animals in British circuses. He was an outspoken critic of sport hunting; in response to the killing of Cecil the lion, an incident which sparked global outrage, The Telegraph published an opinion piece by Moore:

"Sport" hunting is a sickness, a perversion and a danger and should be recognised as such. People who get their "amusement" from hunting and killing defenceless animals can only be suffering from a mental disorder. We know that we should protect the most vulnerable and helpless in society, not destroy them – much less derive pleasure from doing so. Thankfully, those of us with a conscience are appalled by the idea of gunning down animals for the sake of a thrill or a photo. Interest in hunting in Great Britain and elsewhere is steadily declining since decent people prefer to hike, take photographs, kayak and generally enjoy the outdoors without killing other beings.

== Personal life ==
=== Doorn van Steyn ===
In 1946, aged 18, Moore married a fellow RADA student, the actress and ice skater Doorn Van Steyn (born Lucy Woodard), who was six years his senior; Moore and Van Steyn lived in Streatham with her family, but tension over money matters and her lack of confidence in his acting ability took their toll on the relationship, during which he allegedly suffered domestic abuse.

=== Dorothy Squires ===
In 1952, Moore met the Welsh singer Dorothy Squires, who was 12 years his senior, and Van Steyn and Moore divorced the following year. Squires and Moore were married in New York. They lived in Bexley, Kent, after their wedding.

They moved to the United States in 1954 to develop their careers, but tension developed in their marriage due to their age difference and Moore's infatuation with starlet Dorothy Provine, and they moved back to the United Kingdom in 1961, where they resided in Sutton Coldfield, near Birmingham. Squires suffered a series of miscarriages during their marriage, and Moore later said the outcome of their marriage might have been different if they had been able to have children.

During their tempestuous relationship Squires smashed a guitar over his head and, after she learned of his affair with the Italian actress Luisa Mattioli, who later became Moore's third wife, Moore said, "She threw a brick through my window. She reached through the glass and grabbed my shirt and she cut her arms doing it...The police came and they said, 'Madam, you're bleeding' and she said, 'It's my heart that's bleeding'." Squires intercepted letters from Mattioli to Moore and planned to include them in her autobiography, but the couple won injunctions against the publication in 1977, which led Squires to sue them unsuccessfully for loss of earnings. The numerous legal cases launched by Squires led her to be declared a vexatious litigant in 1987. Moore paid Squires's hospital bills after her cancer treatment in 1996; she died in 1998.

=== Luisa Mattioli ===
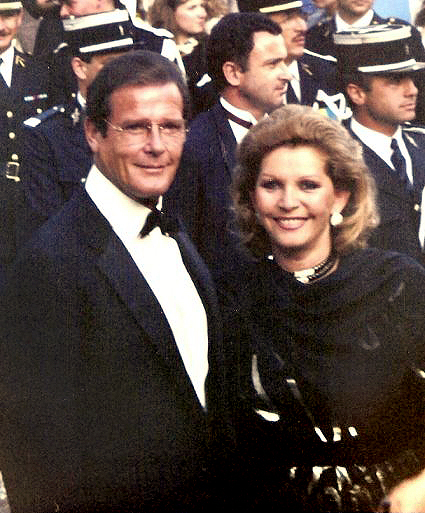
Moore at the 1989 Cannes Film Festival with wife Luisa Mattioli.

In 1961, while filming The Rape of the Sabine Women in Italy, Moore left Squires for the Italian actress Luisa Mattioli. Squires refused to accept their separation, and sued Moore for loss of conjugal rights, but Moore refused the court's order to return to Squires in 28 days. Squires also smashed windows at a house in France where Moore and Mattioli were living, and unsuccessfully sued the actor Kenneth More for libel, as More had introduced Moore and Mattioli at a charity event as "Mr Roger Moore and his wife". Moore and Mattioli lived together until 1969, when Squires finally granted him a divorce, after they had been separated for seven years. At Moore's and Mattioli's marriage in April 1969 at the Caxton Hall in Westminster, London, a crowd of 600 people was outside, with women screaming his name.

Moore had three children with Mattioli: the actress Deborah Moore (born 27 October 1963) and two sons, Geoffrey (born 28 July 1966) and Christian (born 23 August 1973). Geoffrey is also an actor, and appeared alongside his father in the films Sherlock Holmes in New York (1976) and Fire, Ice and Dynamite (1990). In later life, he co-founded Hush Restaurant in Mayfair, London, with Jamie Barber, and released a single in 2023 under the name Jaffa Moore called "You and I" which featured vocals from the late Glee actor Naya Rivera and included host of stars in the music video miming along to the song. Geoffrey and his wife Loulou have two daughters. Moore's younger son, Christian, is a film producer and has four children: a daughter from his first marriage to Heidi Moore, and two sons and a daughter from his second marriage to Lara Sidawi.

=== Kristina "Kiki" Tholstrup ===
Moore and Mattioli separated in 1993 after Moore developed feelings for a Swedish-born Danish socialite, Kristina "Kiki" Tholstrup. Moore later described his prostate cancer diagnosis in 1993 as "life-changing", which led him to reassess his life and marriage. Mattioli and Tholstrup had long been friends, but Mattioli was scathing of her in the book she subsequently wrote about her relationship with Moore, Nothing Lasts Forever, describing how she felt betrayed by Tholstrup and discarded by Moore.

Moore remained silent on his divorce from Mattioli, later saying that he did not wish to hurt his children by "engaging in a war of words". Moore's children refused to speak to him for a period after the divorce, but they were later reconciled with their father. Mattioli refused to grant Moore a divorce until 2000, when a £10 million settlement was agreed. Moore subsequently married Tholstrup in 2002. Moore said that he loved Tholstrup as she was "organised", "serene", "loving", and "calm", saying, "I have a difficult life. I rely on Kristina totally. When we are travelling for my job, she is the one who packs. Kristina takes care of all that". Moore also said that his marriage to Tholstrup was "a tranquil relationship, there are no arguments". Tholstrup had two children, Hans-Christian Knudsen Jr. and Christina Knudsen, from a previous marriage; Christina described her stepfather as a positive influence, saying, "I was in difficult relationships but that all changed" when her mother met Moore. Christina Knudsen died of cancer on 25 July 2016, at the age of 47; Moore wrote, "We are heartbroken" and "We were all with her, surrounding her with love, at the end".

== Political views ==
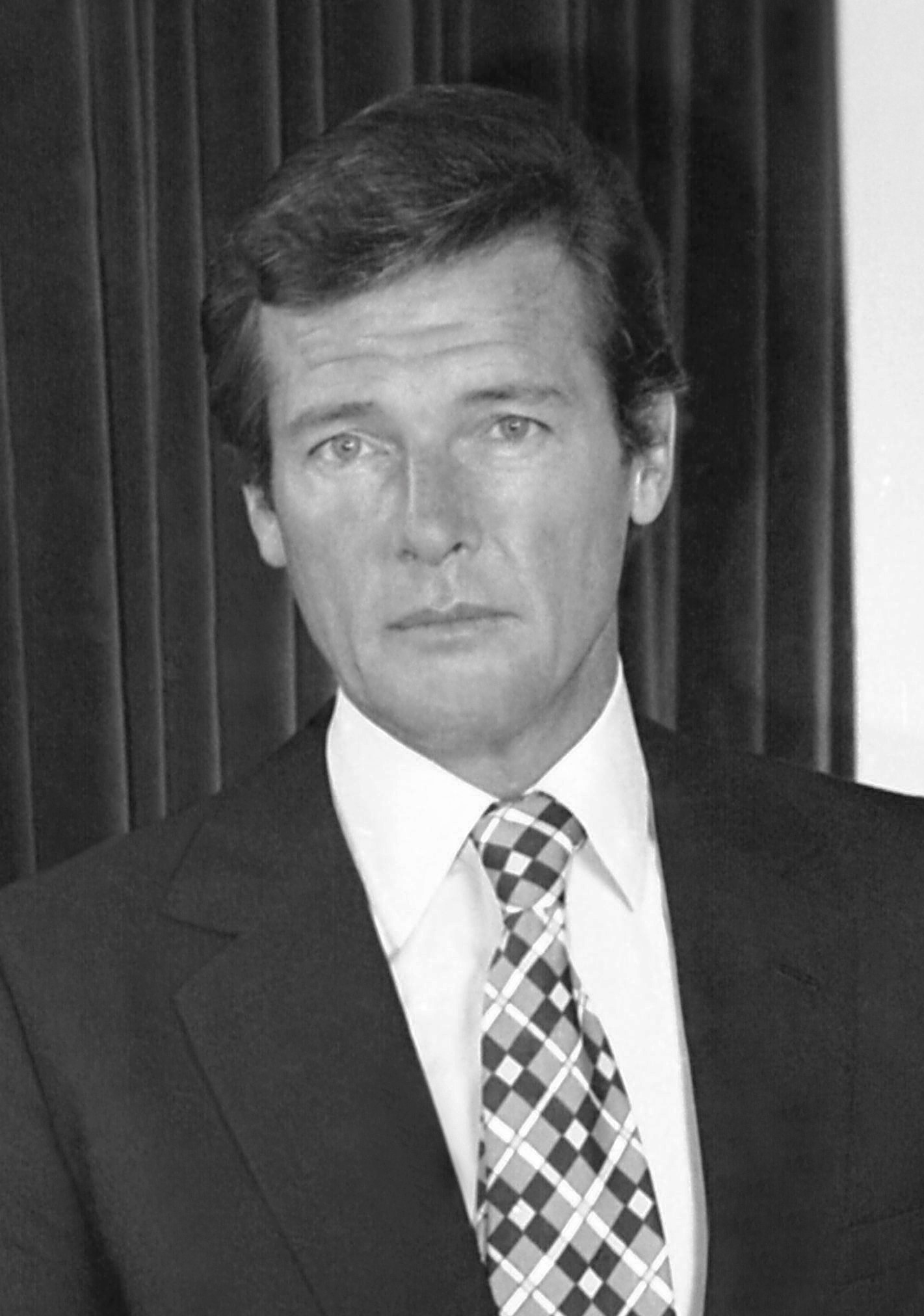
Moore in 1973 by Allan Warren.

On politics, Moore stated he was a conservative and thought that conservatism was the way to run a country. He was described as a "lifelong" supporter of the Conservative Party and endorsed the party during the 2001 general election. However, Moore also expressed a reluctance to be seen as an overtly political figure and felt his work with UNICEF meant that he could not involve himself directly in politics.

In 2011, Moore expressed his support to Conservative Prime Minister David Cameron regarding his policy on the European Union, stating: "I think he's doing absolutely wonderfully well, despite the opposition from many members of his own party. Traitors, I call them. I mean any hardliner within the Conservative Party who speaks out against their leader. You should support your leader."

Moore also expressed support for Britain keeping the pound sterling as its national currency and was glad the British government had not joined the single EU currency, stating: "I would have been very upset if we'd had to take the Queen off our currency. They'd probably have to take her off the stamps and everything. I am British and I'm fiercely independent. And I think we should be independent, as Sean Connery is about Scotland."

In 2015, Moore criticised what he regarded as excessive political correctness within the film industry and felt that rewriting James Bond's sexuality, gender or ethnicity would be a mistake, arguing "it is not about being homophobic or, for that matter, racist – it is simply about being true to the character."

Moore retained membership of the entertainment and media trade union BECTU (now part of Prospect) until his death, having joined as an apprentice animation technician before his acting career took off. At his death, he was the union's longest-tenured member. In 2007, Moore also voiced his support to workers from the Cadbury chocolate factory at Keynsham who were protesting against the plant's closure.

== Tax exile ==
Moore became a tax exile from the United Kingdom in 1978, originally to Switzerland, and divided his year between his four homes: an apartment in Monte Carlo, a holiday house in the coastal Tuscan town of Castiglione della Pescaia, a chalet in Crans-Montana, Switzerland, and a home in Saint-Paul-de-Vence, France. Moore became a resident of Monaco, having been appointed a Goodwill Ambassador of Monaco by Prince Albert II for his efforts in internationally promoting and publicising the principality. Moore was scathing of the Russian population in Monaco, saying, "I'm afraid we're overstuffed with Russians. All the restaurant menus are in Russian now."

Moore was vocal in his defence of his tax exile status, saying that in the 1970s, with taxes levied on top earners under the Labour government of James Callaghan, he had been urged by his "accountants, agents, and lawyers" to move abroad because, "At that point we were taxed up to 98% on unearned income, so you would never be able to save enough to ensure that you had any sort of livelihood if you didn't work." Moore said in 2011 that his decision to live abroad was "not about tax. That's a serious part of it. I come back to England often enough not to miss it, to see the changes, to find some of the changes good. ... I paid my taxes at the time that I was earning a decent income, so I've paid my due".

== Illness and death ==
Moore had a series of diseases during his childhood, including chickenpox, measles, mumps, double pneumonia and jaundice, and had his appendix, tonsils and adenoids removed.

Moore was a long-term sufferer of kidney stones and as a result was briefly hospitalised during the making of Live and Let Die in 1973 and again whilst filming the 1979 film Moonraker. Whilst filming the boat chase in Live and Let Die, Moore crashed a speedboat and suffered a fractured tooth and concussion. During filming for The Spy Who Loved Me, Moore suffered burns on his buttocks during a chair explosion stunt.

In 1993, Moore was diagnosed with prostate cancer and underwent successful treatment for the disease.

In 2003, Moore collapsed on stage while appearing on Broadway, and was fitted with a pacemaker to treat a potentially deadly slow heartbeat. He was diagnosed with type 2 diabetes in 2013. Some years before his final cancer illness, a tumour spot was found in his liver. Then, in 2017, during the period that he was treated for cancer, he fell, badly injuring his collarbone.

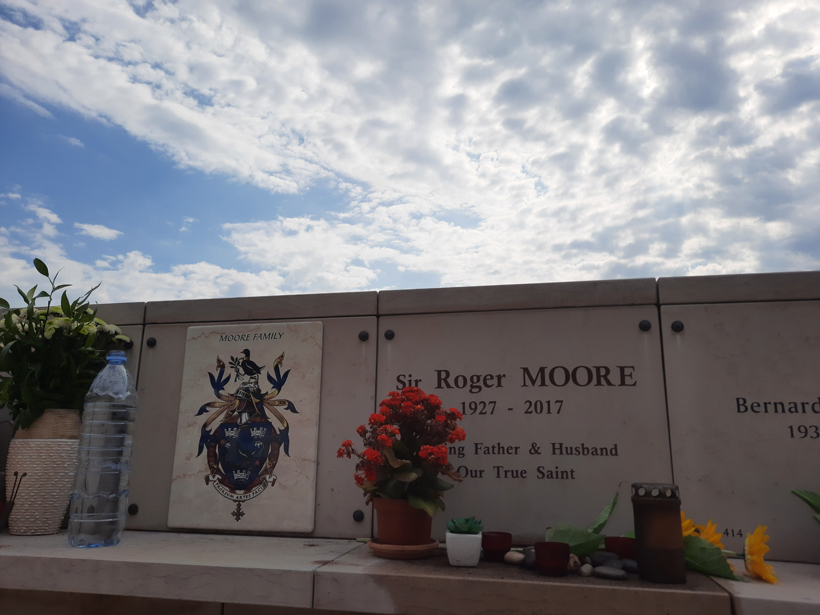
The grave of Roger Moore in Monaco Cemetery

Moore died in the presence of his family at his home in Crans-Montana, Switzerland, on 23 May 2017, from cancers of the lung and liver. He is buried in Monaco Cemetery.

== Royal circles ==
Moore had friendships with some of Denmark's royal family; Prince Joachim and his then-wife Alexandra, Countess of Frederiksborg, invited Moore and his wife Kiki to attend the christening of their youngest son, Prince Felix. In 2004, he attended the Wedding of Frederik, Crown Prince of Denmark, and Mary Donaldson. On 24 May 2008, Moore and his wife attended the wedding of Prince Joachim to his French fiancée Marie Cavallier.

Moore also had a long-standing friendship with Princess Lilian of Sweden, whom he first met on a visit to Stockholm for UNICEF. Moore's wife Kristina, who was born in Sweden, was already a friend of Princess Lilian's through mutual friends. In his autobiography, Moore recalled meeting the princess for tea and dinners whenever his wife and he visited Stockholm. He spoke of his recollections at the princess's memorial service at St Peter and St Sigfrid's Church in Stockholm, on 8 September 2013.

On 1 and 2 July 2011, Moore and his wife attended the wedding of Albert II, Prince of Monaco and Charlene Wittstock.

== Awards and legacy ==
"Most people settle on Sir Roger Moore or Sir Sean Connery as their favourite Bond. Why Moore? Because he was Bond incarnate, and then some. He was the quintessential Englishman, somewhere between gentleman and jester – a slick, schmaltzy, suave provocateur. He handled the tone of the role perfectly, pitching his delivery somewhere between the camp kitsch of [Pierce Brosnan] and the smouldering cool of Connery. Moore's 007 was, in a word, fun: never above a wry laugh, preferably with a dry Martini in hand."

— Francis Blagburn writing in The Telegraph, May 2017.

Moore was appointed Commander of the Order of the British Empire (CBE) in the 1999 New Year Honours and was promoted to Knight Commander of the Order of the British Empire (KBE) in the 2003 Birthday Honours for charitable services, especially UNICEF and latterly Kiwanis International, which had dominated his public life for more than a decade. On being knighted, Moore said that the citation "meant far more to me than if I had got it for acting... I was proud because I received it on behalf of UNICEF as a whole and for all it has achieved over the years".

On 11 October 2007, three days before he turned 80, Moore was awarded a star on the Hollywood Walk of Fame for his work on television and in film. Attending the ceremony were family, friends, and Richard Kiel, with whom he had acted in The Spy Who Loved Me and Moonraker. Moore's star was the 2,350th star installed, and is appropriately located at 7007 Hollywood Boulevard.

On 28 October 2008, the French government appointed Moore a Commander of the Ordre des Arts et des Lettres. On 21 November 2012 Moore was awarded an honorary doctorate from the University of Hertfordshire for his outstanding contributions to the British film and television industry for over 50 years, in particular film and television productions in Hertfordshire.

After his death, the Roger Moore Stage was opened at Pinewood Studios at a ceremony held in October 2017 to celebrate his life and work. His wife and family were in attendance along with Bond producers Michael G Wilson and Barbara Broccoli.

In the 2018 film My Dinner with Hervé, Moore was portrayed by actor Mark Umbers.

For his charity work

- 2012: UNICEF's UK Lifetime Achievement Award
- 2007: Dag Hammarskjöld Inspiration Award (UNICEF)
- 2004: UNICEF's Audrey Hepburn Humanitarian Award
- 2003: German Federal Cross of Merit (Bundesverdienstkreuz) for his UNICEF work
- 2003: Knight Commander of the Order of the British Empire (KBE)
- 2001: Kiwanis International World Service Medal
- 1999: Commander of the Order of the British Empire (CBE)

Lifetime achievements awards

- 2008: Commander of the French National Order of Arts and Letters (Ordre national des Arts et des Lettres)
- 2007: Hollywood Walk of Fame
- 2004: TELEKAMERA ("Tele Tydzień" Lifetime Achievement Award, Poland)
- 2002: Monte Carlo TV Festival (Lifetime Achievement Award)
- 2001: Lifetime achievement award (Filmfestival, Jamaica)
- 1997: Palm Springs film festival, USA, Lifetime Achievement Award
- 1995: TELE GATTO (Italian TV; Lifetime Achievement Award)
- 1991: GOLDEN CAMERA (German TV; lifetime achievement award)
- 1990: BAMBI (Lifetime Achievement Award from the German magazine BUNTE)

For his acting

- 1981: OTTO (Most popular Film Star; from German Magazine BRAVO)
- 1980: Golden Globe Henrietta Award for World Film Favorite – Male.
- 1980: Saturn Award (Most Popular International Performer)
- 1973: BAMBI (shared with Tony Curtis for The Persuaders, from the German magazine BUNTE)
- 1973: BEST ACTOR IN TV, award from the French magazine TELE-7-JOURS, shared with Tony Curtis for The Persuaders
- 1967: ONDAS-AWARD (Spanish TV for The Saint)
- 1967: OTTO (Most popular TV-star for The Saint; from German magazine BRAVO)

== In popular culture ==
Roger Moore is contentiously credited with inspiring the Walls Magnum ice cream. In the 1960s, he reportedly said that his one wish would be for a choc ice on a stick. Walls created this product and sent one to Moore. They later launched the Magnum in 1989, which is now the world's top-selling ice cream brand.

Moore is the subject of the 2024 documentary film From Roger Moore with Love.

== Filmography ==
=== Film roles ===
Year	Title	Role	Notes	Ref.
1945	Perfect Strangers	Sailor	Uncredited	
1945	Caesar and Cleopatra	Roman Soldier	Uncredited	
1946	Gaiety George	Audience Member	Uncredited	
1946	Piccadilly Incident	Guest at Pearson's Table	Uncredited	
1949	Paper Orchid	Extra	Uncredited	
1949	Trottie True	Stage Door Johnny	Uncredited	
1949	The Interrupted Journey	Soldier in Paddington Café	Uncredited	
1951	One Wild Oat	Extra	Uncredited	
1951	Honeymoon Deferred	Ornithologist on Train	Uncredited	
1954	The Last Time I Saw Paris	Paul		
1955	Interrupted Melody	Cyril Lawrence		
1955	The King's Thief	Jack		
1956	Diane	Prince Henri		
1959	The Miracle	Captain Michael Stuart		
1961	The Sins of Rachel Cade	Paul Wilton		
1961	Gold of the Seven Saints	Shaun Garrett		
1962	Romulus and the Sabines	Romulus		
1962	No Man's Land	Enzo Prati		
1968	The Fiction Makers	Simon Templar		
1969	Vendetta for the Saint	Simon Templar		
1969	Crossplot	Gary Fenn		
1970	The Man Who Haunted Himself	Harold Pelham		
1973	Live and Let Die	James Bond		
1974	Gold	Rod Slater		
1974	The Man with the Golden Gun	James Bond		
1975	That Lucky Touch	Michael Scott		
1976	Street People	Ulysses		
1976	Shout at the Devil	Sebastian Oldsmith		
1976	Sherlock Holmes in New York	Sherlock Holmes		
1977	The Spy Who Loved Me	James Bond		
1978	The Wild Geese	Lieutenant Shaun Fynn		
1979	Escape to Athena	Major Otto Hecht		
1979	Moonraker	James Bond		
1979	North Sea Hijack	Rufus Excalibur ffolkes		
1980	The Sea Wolves	Captain Gavin Stewart		
1980	Sunday Lovers	Harry Lindon		
1981	The Cannonball Run	Seymour Goldfarb Jr		
1981	For Your Eyes Only	James Bond		
1983	Octopussy	James Bond		
1983	Curse of the Pink Panther	Chief Inspector Jacques Clouseau	Credited as Turk Thrust II	
1984	The Naked Face	Dr. Judd Stevens		
1985	A View to a Kill	James Bond	Final Bond role	
1987	The Magic Snowman	Lumi Ukko, the Snowman	Voice role	
1990	Fire, Ice and Dynamite	Sir George Windsor		
1990	Bullseye!	Sir John Bevistock		
1992	Bed & Breakfast	Adam		
1995	The Man Who Wouldn't Die	Thomas Grace	Also executive producer	
1996	The Quest	Lord Edgar Dobbs		
1997	Spice World	The Chief		
1997	The Saint	Radio Announcer	Voice role	
2001	The Enemy	Superintendent Robert Ogilvie		
2002	On Our Own Vesna	Roger Moore		
2002	Boat Trip	Lloyd Faversham		
2004	The Fly Who Loved Me	Father Christmas	Voice role	
2006	Here Comes Peter Cottontail: The Movie	January Q. Irontail	Voice role	
2008	Agent Crush	Burt Gasket	Voice role	
2009	The Wild Swans	Archbishop	Voice role	
2010	Cats & Dogs: The Revenge of Kitty Galore	Tab Lazenby	Voice role	
2011	The Lighter	George Boreman	Voice role	
2011	A Princess for Christmas	Edward, Duke of Castlebury		
2013	Incompatibles	Roger Moore		
2015	Troll Hunters	Leif	Voice role	
2016	The Carer	Himself		
2017	The Saint	Jasper	Final role	

=== Television roles ===
Year	Title	Role	Notes	Ref.
1949	The Governess	Bob Drew	TV film	
1949	A House in the Square	John Anstruther	TV film	
1950	Drawing-Room Detective	Unknown	BBC TV, 27 May 1950	
1953	Robert Montgomery Presents	French Diplomat	Episode: "World by the Tail"	
1953	The Clay of Kings	Josiah Wedgwood	TV film	
1953	Julius Caesar	Unknown	TV film	
1953	Black Chiffon	Unknown	TV film	
1956	Ford Star Jubilee	Billy Mitchell	Episode: "This Happy Breed"	
1956	Goodyear Playhouse	Patrick Simmons	Episode: "A Murder Is Announced"	
1957	Assignment Foreign Legion	Legionnaire Paul Harding	Episode: "The Richest Man in the Legion"	
1957	Lux Video Theatre	Gavin	Episode: "The Taggart Light"	
1957	NBC Matinee Theater	Randolph Churchill	Episode: "The Remarkable Mr. Jerome"	
1958–1959	Ivanhoe	Ivanhoe	All 39 episodes	
1959	The Third Man	Jimmy Simms	Episode: "The Angry Young Man"	
1959	Alfred Hitchcock Presents	Inspector Benson	Season 4 Episode 24: "The Avon Emeralds"	
1959–1960	The Alaskans	Silky Harris	All 37 episodes	
1959–1961	Maverick	Beau Maverick	16 episodes	
1961	77 Sunset Strip	Radio Announcer	Voice; Episode: "Vacation with Pay"	
1961	The Roaring 20's	14 Karat John	2 episodes	
1962–1969	The Saint	Simon Templar	All 118 episodes	
1964	Mainly Millicent	James Bond	Episode: "17 July 1964"	
1965	The Trials of O'Brien	Roger Taney	Episode: "What Can Go Wrong"	
1971–1972	The Persuaders!	Lord Brett Sinclair	All 24 episodes	
1977–1978	Laugh-In	Roger Moore	4 episodes	
1999	The Dream Team	Desmond Heath	4 episodes	
2000	Victoria Wood with All the Trimmings	Roger Moore	Christmas special	
2002	Alias	Edward Poole	Episode: "The Prophecy"	
2002	Tatort	Roger Moore	Episode: "Schatten"	
2005	Foley & McColl: This Way Up	Butler	TV film	
2014	The Life of Rock with Brian Pern	George Lazenby	Episode: "The Day of the Triffids"	

== Publications ==
Moore's book about the filming of Live and Let Die, based on his diaries, titled Roger Moore as James Bond: Roger Moore's Own Account of Filming Live and Let Die, was published in London in 1973, by Pan Books. The book includes an acknowledgment to Sean Connery, with whom Moore was friends for many years: "I would also like to thank Sean Connery – with whom it would not have been possible."

Moore's autobiography My Word is My Bond (ISBN 0-06-167388-9) was published by Collins in the US, in November 2008 and by Michael O'Mara Books Ltd in the UK, on 2 October 2008 (ISBN 978-1-84317-318-2).

On 16 October 2012, Bond on Bond was published to tie in with the 50th anniversary of the James Bond films. The book, with many pictures, is based on Moore's own memories, thoughts, and anecdotes about all things 007, with some of the profits of the book going to UNICEF.

== Books ==
- Roger Moore as James Bond: Roger Moore's Own Account of Filming Live and Let Die. Pan Books. 1973. ISBN 978-0-330-23653-9.
- My Word Is My Bond: The Autobiography. Michael O'Mara. 2008. ISBN 978-1-84317-387-8.
- Bond on Bond: The Ultimate Book on 50 Years of Bond Movies. Michael O'Mara. 2012. ISBN 978-1-84317-861-3.
- Last Man Standing: Tales from Tinseltown. Michael O'Mara. 2014. ISBN 978-1-78243-207-4. "(published as One Lucky Bastard in the United States)"
- À bientôt ... Michael O'Mara. 2017. ISBN 978-1-78243-861-8.
