= Alien Terminator (1988 film) =

Top Line
- Directed by: Ted Archer
- Written by: Roberto Gianviti; Nello Rossati
- Starring: Franco Nero; George Kennedy
- Cinematography: Mario DiLeo
- Edited by: Adalberto Ceccarelli
- Music by: Maurizio Dami
- Release date: 1988
- Country: Italy
- Language: Italian

Alien Terminator (Italian: Top Line) is a 1988 Italian film directed by Nello Rossati. It is an action film with a climax that includes UFOs and aliens. It was released on video as Top Line.

== Plot ==
Ted Angelo, a writer struggling with alcoholism and his declining career, is fired by his publisher and ex-wife Maureen De Havilland while on an expedition in Cartagena to do research on pre-Columbian civilizations. While pondering his return home, Ted comes across a trove of 16th-Century findings from a ship of Spanish conquistadores. His best friend, art historian Alonso Quintero, helps Ted find a buyer in the black market, but is soon found dead.

When another merchant is murdered, Ted learns from the man who had tried to sell him the loot - a marijuana dealer posing as a fisherman - that the Spanish ship is located not underwater, but inside a mountain cave. Upon climbing the mountain and finding the ship, Ted discovers that the cave is the inside of a UFO that captured the ship five centuries earlier and crash-landed shortly afterwards. Aided by young art historian June, former colleague of Quintero's, Ted escapes assassination attempts by local hitmen and by Heinrich Holzmann, an antiquarian and National Socialist fugitive whom Quintero had suggested as a potential buyer.

Ted enlists a two-man film crew to return to the mountain and shoot a scoop, but these are soon revealed to be undercover CIA operatives: while trying to frame Ted for murder, one of them is killed; the other gives chase, but is later lost by Ted, who has taken refuge on a truck driven by a couple of drunk local farmers. Ted considers selling the information to the Soviet embassy in Bogotà, but after realizing that the KGB is already involved, he and June convince Maureen to come to Colombia and rescue them.

The next day, while waiting for Maureen to reach them by boat, Ted and June are attacked by another hitman. In the ensuing chase, their pursuer turns out to be a cyborg, which is gored by a bull and destroyed. That night, Maureen arrives, but as her boatman appears to be a double of the cybernetic assassin, she removes her own skin, revealing herself as an alien. Maureen tells Ted that her kind have been visiting Earth for twelve thousand years, and that with the rise of human civilization they have learned to disguise as humans, taking over all the key political and executive positions and keeping their existence a secret. She then tries to kill Ted, but is shot dead by June.

Ted and June go into hiding and are later seen living with an indigenous tribe, where Ted keeps writing the report on his findings, hoping that his story will one day leak to the public.

== Cast ==
- Franco Nero as Ted Angelo
- George Kennedy as Heinrich Holzmann
- Deborah Moore as June (credited as Deborah Barrymore)
- Mary Stavin as Maureen De Havilland
- William Berger as Alonso Kintero
- Shirley Hernandez: Juanita
- Larry Dolgin
- Robert Redcross

== Release ==
The film was released theatrically in Germany on September 22, 1988.

Released on Region 1 DVD on May 25, 2004 Several sites have the movie available for streaming, including as of March 2022, Amazon

== Reception ==
Sci-Fi 100 found the first hour of the movie to be an Indiana Jones rip-off with little as far as sci-fi elements, but they did find the last 30 minutes to be interesting and increasing the amount of science fiction. Film Authority gave the movie 3 stars, finding it a weird mishmash of Romancing the Stone, Close Encounters and The Terminator.

== See also ==
- List of Italian films of 1988
