= List of Italian films of 1989 =

A list of films produced in Italy in 1989 (see 1989 in film):

Title	Director	Cast	Genre	Notes
After Death	Claudio Fragasso	Jeff Stryker, Candice Daly	Horror	
About That Foreign Girl	Marco Leto	Helmut Griem, Joely Richardson, Duilio Del Prete	Drama-Mystery	
Amori in corso	Giuseppe Bertolucci	Amanda Sandrelli	comedy	
Arabella Black Angel	Stelvio Massi	Tinì Cansino	Giallo	
Il bambino e il poliziotto	Carlo Verdone	Carlo Verdone, Barbara Cupisti	crime-comedy	
Bankomatt	Villi Hermann	Bruno Ganz, Francesca Neri	drama	Italian-Swiss co-production
Beyond the Door III / Death Train	Jeff Kwitny	Bo Svenson	horror	
Blue Angel Cafe / Object of Desire	Joe D'Amato	Tara Buckman	erotic	
Born to Fight / Nato per combattere	Bruno Mattei	Brent Huff, Werner Pochath	Eurowar	Italian-Filipino co-production
La bottega dell'orefice	Michael Anderson	Burt Lancaster, Olivia Hussey, Ben Cross, Jo Champa	drama	based on a play written by Karol Wojtyla (Pope John Paul II)
Burro	José María Sánchez	Renato Pozzetto, Elena Sofia Ricci	comedy-drama	
Casablanca Express	Sergio Martino	Jason Connery, Francesco Quinn	Eurowar	
'The Church	Michele Soavi	Tomas Arana, Asia Argento	Horror	
The Belt	Giuliana Gamba	James Russo, Eleonora Brigliadori	erotic drama	
Codice privato	Francesco Maselli	Ornella Muti	drama	
Crystal or Ash, Fire or Wind, as Long as It's Love	Lina Wertmüller	Rutger Hauer, Nastassja Kinski, Dominique Sanda, Peter O'Toole, Faye Dunaway	drama	entered the competition at the 46th Venice International Film Festival
Dark Bar	Stelio Fiorenza	Marina Suma	drama	
Dimenticare Palermo	Francesco Rosi	James Belushi, Mimi Rogers, Joss Ackland	Thriller	
Disperatamente Giulia	Enrico Maria Salerno	Tahnee Welch, Fabio Testi, Dalila Di Lazzaro, Laura Antonelli	romance	TV miniseries
The End of the Night	Davide Ferrario	Claudio Bigagli, John Sayles	crime-drama	
Etoile	Peter Del Monte	Jennifer Connelly, Charles Durning	—N/a	
Fashion Crimes	Damiano Damiani	Anthony Franciosa, Miles O'Keeffe	giallo	
Le finte bionde	Carlo Vanzina	Cinzia Leone	comedy	
Francesco	Liliana Cavani	Mickey Rourke, Helena Bonham Carter, Andréa Ferréol	biographical drama	Entered into the 1989 Cannes Film Festival
Fratelli d'Italia	Neri Parenti	Christian De Sica, Jerry Calà, Massimo Boldi	Comedy	
Goodnight, Michaelangelo	Carlo Liconti	Kim Cattrall, Giancarlo Giannini, Kim Coates, Lina Sastri	Comedy	
Ho vinto la lotteria di Capodanno	Neri Parenti	Paolo Villaggio, Antonio Allocca	Comedy	
The Icicle Thief (Ladri di saponette)	Maurizio Nichetti	Maurizio Nichetti, Caterina Sylos Labini, Federico Rizzo, Heidi Komarek, Renato Scarpa	Comedy	Golden St. George at Moscow, Nastro d'Argento best script
Indio	Antonio Margheriti	Marvelous Marvin Hagler, Francesco Quinn, Brian Dennehy	Adventure-Action	
Killer Crocodile	Fabrizio De Angelis	Van Johnson	Horror	
Leathernecks / Colli di cuoio	Ignazio Dolce	Richard Hatch, Tanya Gomez	Eurowar	
Marrakech Express	Gabriele Salvatores	Diego Abatantuono, Fabrizio Bentivoglio, Cristina Marsillach	comedy	
Massacre Play / Gioco al massacro	Damiano Damiani	Tomas Milian, Elliott Gould, Nathalie Baye	drama	
Merry Christmas... Happy New Year	Luigi Comencini	Virna Lisi, Michel Serrault	comedy-drama	
Mery per sempre	Marco Risi	Michele Placido, Claudio Amendola, Francesco Benigno	drama	
Mortacci	Sergio Citti	Vittorio Gassman, Carol Alt, Malcolm McDowell, Mariangela Melato	commedia all'italiana	
Musica per vecchi animali	Umberto Angelucci, Stefano Benni	Dario Fo, Paolo Rossi, Francesco Guccini	comedy-drama	
Ne parliamo Lunedì	Luciano Odorisio	Andrea Roncato, Elena Sofia Ricci	comedy-drama	
Night Club	Sergio Corbucci	Christian De Sica, Mara Venier, Sabina Guzzanti	comedy	Set in 1960
Nostos: The Return	Franco Piavoli	Luigi Mezzanotte	adventure-drama	
'O Re	Luigi Magni	Giancarlo Giannini, Ornella Muti, Luc Merenda	commedia all'italiana	
Paganini	Klaus Kinski	Klaus Kinski, Debora Caprioglio, Dalila Di Lazzaro	biographical drama	
Paganini Horror	Luigi Cozzi	Daria Nicolodi, Donald Pleasence	Horror	
Piccoli equivoci	Ricky Tognazzi	Sergio Castellitto, Lina Sastri, Nancy Brilli	comedy	
Il prete bello	Carlo Mazzacurati	Roberto Citran	drama	
The Red Monks	Gianni Martucci	Gerardo Merrato, Daniela Barnes, Malisa Longo	Horror	
Red Wood Pigeon (Palombella rossa)	Nanni Moretti	Nanni Moretti, Silvio Orlando, Asia Argento	Comedy	Nastro d'Argento best script
Santa Sangre	Alejandro Jodorowsky	Guy Stockwell	drama	Mexican-Italian co-production
Scugnizzi	Pupi Avati	Leo Gullotta, Pino Caruso, Aldo Giuffrè	musical drama	
Secret Scandal	Monica Vitti	Monica Vitti, Giancarlo Giannini, Stefania Sandrelli	commedia all'italiana	
Sinbad of the Seven Seas	Enzo G. Castellari	Lou Ferrigno, John Steiner, Alessandra Martines	commedia all'italiana	
The Sleazy Uncle	Franco Brusati	Vittorio Gassman, Elliott Gould, Catherine Spaak	commedia all'italiana	
Splendor	Ettore Scola	Marcello Mastroianni, Massimo Troisi, Marina Vlady	Filmgoer	entered into the 1989 Cannes Film Festival
The Story of Boys and Girls (Storia di ragazzi e di ragazze)	Pupi Avati	Felice Andreasi, Lucrezia Lante della Rovere, Valeria Bruni Tedeschi	Comedy- Drama	Filmed in black and white, outside Italy, it's shown in color. 2 Nastro d'Argento. David di Donatello best script
The Tenth One in Hiding	Lina Wertmüller	Piera Degli Esposti, Dominique Sanda	drama	Screened at the 1989 Cannes Film Festival
Time to Kill	Giuliano Montaldo	Nicolas Cage, Ricky Tognazzi, Giancarlo Giannini	Drama	
Torrents of Spring	Jerzy Skolimowski	Timothy Hutton, Nastassja Kinski, Valeria Golino	romance	British-French-Italian co-production
Ultimo minuto	Pupi Avati	Ugo Tognazzi, Elena Sofia Ricci, Diego Abatantuono	Comedy- Drama	2 David di Donatello
Vogliamoci troppo bene	Francesco Salvi	Francesco Salvi	Comedy	
What Time Is It? (Che ora è?)	Ettore Scola	Marcello Mastroianni, Massimo Troisi, Anne Parillaud	Drama	4 Venice Awards
Wait Until Spring, Bandini	Dominique Deruddere	Joe Mantegna, Ornella Muti, Faye Dunaway	romance	Belgian-Italian-French-American co-production
Willy Signori e vengo da lontano	Francesco Nuti	Francesco Nuti, Isabella Ferrari, Anna Galiena	Comedy	
Witch Story	Alessandro Capone	Amy Adams, Jeff Bankert, Ian Bannen		

== Footnotes ==
=== Sources ===
- Curti, Roberto (2019). Italian Gothic Horror Films, 1980-1989. McFarland. ISBN 978-1476672434.
- Curti, Roberto (2022). Italian Giallo in Film and Television. McFarland. ISBN 978-1-4766-8248-8.
- Luther Smith, Adrian (1999). Blood & Black Lace. Stray Cat Publishing. ISBN 0-9533261-1-X.
