= Ian McCulloch (actor) =

Scottish actor

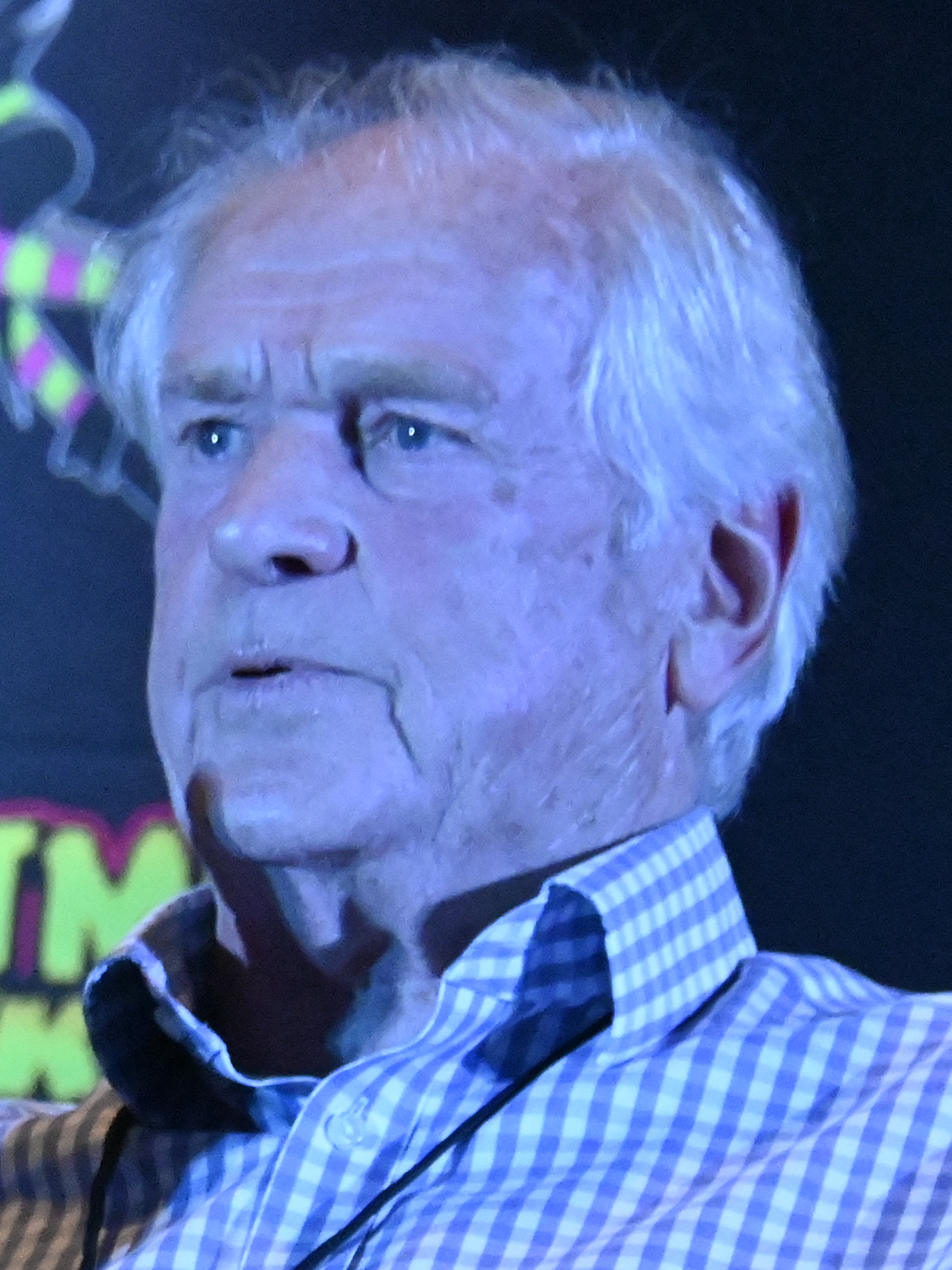
- McCulloch at Nightmare Weekend Richmond in 2023
- Born: 18 November 1939 (age 86); Glasgow, Scotland
- Education: University of Oxford
- Occupations: Actor; screenwriter
- Years active: 1967–present
- Relatives: Andrew McCulloch (brother)

Ian McCulloch (born 18 November 1939) is a Scottish actor. He is best known for his starring role as Greg Preston in the post-apocalyptic television drama Survivors (1975–77), and for his work in Italian horror cinema.

== Early life and education ==
Born in Glasgow in 1939, McCulloch fulfilled his National Service in the British Army before enrolling at the University of Oxford. He recalled in a 2003 interview, "At University I couldn't get any parts and actually did more opera than acting. I did go to the Edinburgh Fringe in 1960 and then directed a college production of The Government Inspector." Upon graduating, he was offered a contract with the Royal Shakespeare Company.

== Career ==
=== Theatre ===
McCulloch made his Royal Shakespeare debut in the 1962 season. He made his West End debut in Richard III in 1964. That same year, he played Captain Macheath in The Beggar's Opera at the Birmingham Repertory Theatre. During the following decades he appeared in various stage productions, including a starring role as Martin Dysart in Equus at the Theatre Royal, Windsor.

=== Survivors ===
McCulloch debuted in the second episode, "Genesis", of Survivors and went on to appear regularly throughout the first two series, leaving the show in its third and final series, only appearing in Episodes 2 and 10. He reprised his role in the 2014-17 Big Finish Productions audio drama continuation.

=== Other film and television roles ===
Over the years, McCulloch has had supporting roles in studio films like Where Eagles Dare (1968) with Richard Burton and Clint Eastwood, and Cromwell (1970) with Alec Guinness and Richard Harris. In addition, he has appeared in successful independent films, most notably The Ghoul (1975) with Peter Cushing and John Hurt.

McCulloch has also guest starred in many TV series, including: Manhunt (1969); Colditz (1974), as the mysterious Larry Page in "Odd Man In"; Secret Army (1977); Return of the Saint (1978); Hammer House of Horror (1980); The Professionals (1980), episode "Mixed Doubles", in which he played the physical fitness and close quarters combat instructor of Bodie and Doyle; and the Doctor Who serial Warriors of the Deep (1984).

He also starred in the Italian horror films Zombie Flesh Eaters also known as Zombi II (1979) by Lucio Fulci, Zombi Holocaust (1980) by Marino Girolami, and Contamination (1980) by Luigi Cozzi. Zombie Flesh Eaters was originally banned in the United Kingdom as part of the 1980s campaign against "video nasties". McCulloch stated that he did not see the film in its entirety, or on a big screen, until years later.

== Personal life ==
McCulloch's brother Andrew (b. 1945) is a television writer and actor.

== Filmography ==
=== Film ===
Year	Title	Role	Director	Notes
1967	It!	Det. Wayne	Herbert J. Leder	
1968	Where Eagles Dare	German Officer	Brian G. Hutton	
1970	Cromwell	John Hampden	Ken Hughes	
1971	I, Monster	Man at Bar	Stephen Weeks	
1974	Soft Beds, Hard Battles	Col. Braun	Roy Boulting	
1975	The Ghoul	Geoffrey	Freddie Francis	
1979	Zombie Flesh Eaters	Peter West	Lucio Fulci	Original Italian title: Zombi 2
1980	Zombie Holocaust	Peter Chandler	Marino Girolami	Original Italian title: Zombi Holocaust
1980	Contamination	Ian Hubbard	Luigi Cozzi	
1982	Moonlighting	Boss Lookalike	Jerzy Skolimowski	
2013	Behind the Scenes of Total Hell: The Jamie Gunn Chronicles	Charles Leeson	Andy Wilton	

=== Television ===
Year	Title	Role	Notes
1967	The Revenue Men	Major Cross	Episode: "Deadly Cargo"
1967	Man in a Suitcase	Kemp	Episode: "Sweet Sue"
1968	The Flight of the Heron	Ewen Cameron	2 episodes
1969	The Borderers	Robin Graham	5 Episodes
1970	Manhunt	David Mainwaring	2 episodes
1970	Dr. Finlay's Casebook	Willie / Andie Watson	2 episodes
1970	Menace	Croxley	Episode: "The Innocent"
1971	The Search for the Nile	Capt. James Grant	3 Episodes
1973	Crown Court	The Rev. Frank Warrender	Episode: "R v Brewer and Brewer"
1974	Colditz	Larry Page	Episode: "Odd Man In"
1974	The Aweful Mr. Goodall	Henry Mullard	Episode: "Loyalty in My Honor"
1974	Sutherland's Law	Pharic McFee	Episode: "Just a Little Death"
1975	The Nearly Man	Peter Richards	5 episodes
1975–77	Survivors	Greg Preston	Series 1-3; Also writer; 3 episodes
1977	Secret Army	Malaud	Episode: "Child's Play"
1978	Return of the Saint	Inspector Stone	Episode: "The Arrangement"
1979	Running Blind	Jack Case	2 episodes
1980	Hammer House of Horror	Dr. Charles Henderson	Episode: "Witching Time"
1980	Lady Killers	John Inglis	Episode: "Miss Madeleine Smith"
1980	The Professionals	Macklin	Episode: "Mixed Doubles"
1981	Diamonds	Barry Coleman	12 episodes
1983–84	Take The High Road	Derek Conway	23 episodes
1984	Doctor Who	Nilson	Serial: "Warriors of the Deep"
1985	Dempsey and Makepeace	Archie McAllister	Episode: "Given to Acts of Violence"
1985	Bergerac	Walt Mitchell	Episode: "Off Shore Trades"
1988	Brookside	Morrison	2 episodes
1989	Children's Ward	Dr. McKeown	12 episodes
1990	Taggart	Donald Gillan / Donald Martin	2 episodes
1991	Agatha Christie's Poirot	Jonathan Maltravers	Episode: "The Tragedy at Marsdon Manor"
1991	City Lights	Dr. Shepherd	Episode: "The Haunting of Willie Melvin"
1994	The Tales of Para Handy	Laird Fergusson	Episode: "Para Handy, Poacher"

=== Audio ===
Year	Title	Voice role	Notes
2014–17	Survivors	Greg Preston	14 episodes
