= Festa (surname) =

Festa is a surname. Notable people with the surname include:

- Al Festa (1957–2026), Italian film director
- Alberto Festa (born 1939), Portuguese footballer
- Chris Festa (born 1985), American race car driver
- Costanzo Festa (1495–1545), Italian composer
- David Festa (born 2000), American baseball player
- Gianluca Festa (born 1969), Italian football manager
- Gianluca Festa (politician) (born 1974), Italian politician and basketball player
- Giorgio Festa (1860–1940), Italian physician
- Marco Festa (born 1992), Italian footballer
- Matt Festa (born 1993), American baseball player
- Mike Festa (born 1954), American lawyer
- Paul Festa, American writer and filmmaker
- Sebastiano Festa (1490–1524), Italian composer

== See also ==
- Festa (disambiguation)
