= Paganini Horror =

- Theatrical release poster by Enzo Sciotti
- Directed by: Luigi Cozzi
- Screenplay by: Luigi Cozzi; Daria Nicolodi
- Story by: Raimondo Del Bazo
- Produced by: Fabrizio De Angelis
- Starring: Daria Nicolodi; Jasmine Maimone; Pascal Persiano; Donald Pleasence
- Cinematography: Franco Lecca
- Edited by: Sergio Montanari
- Music by: Vince Tempera
- Production company: Fulvia Film
- Distributed by: Fulvia Film
- Release date: 6 June 1989 (Italy)
- Running time: 82 minutes
- Country: Italy

Paganini Horror is a 1989 Italian horror film directed by Luigi Cozzi. The film tells the story of a largely female rock band who acquires an unpublished score by composer Niccolò Paganini and decides to record it. When the band films a music video for the song in Paganini's ancient home, it awakens the spirit of the deceased composer and unlocks a portal to Hell.

== Plot ==
At La Casa di Sol, an ancient Venezian home of various composers through the ages, a young violinist practices a piece by Paganini and then inexplicably electrocutes her bathing mother with a hairdryer.

A female rock band recording in a studio are told by their manager, Lavinia, that they should find a new song. The drummer, Daniel, travels to meet with a Mr. Pickett, who sells him an unpublished score by Paganini. Daniel demonstrates the new piece, "Paganini Horror", for Lavinia and the lead singer, Kate, with all three agreeing to record it. Lavinia suggests they employ famed horror director Mark Singer to film a video and Kate suggests they film at La Casa di Sol, with Lavinia adding that she knows the current homeowner, Sylvia.

During the video shoot, Sylvia reveals the legend that Paganini himself once resided in the house and murdered his bride, Antonia, there. Meanwhile, Pickett travels to St Mark's Campanile, where he throws the money Daniel gave him off the roof and invokes Paganini's curse.

Rita, the bass player, is confronted by Paganini, whom she assumes is Daniel wearing his costume from the video shoot; however, he stabs her to death with a violin. Sylvia and the guitarist, Elena, announce that Rita has vanished; Lavinia suggests she be replaced, while Mark suggests they finish the video using mannequins. While going to collect the mannequins, Daniel sees Rita and is summoned by her to another room, where Paganini murders him.

Sylvia finds Daniel's ring amongst ash and they decide Daniel has played a joke on them when the ground opens beneath Kate and she falls. As Mark tries to help her out of the hole, he is electrocuted and drops Kate into the hole. Mark and Elena are driven from the house by deafening sounds, but when they try to escape, their car hits an invisible barrier, ejecting Elena from the car and engulfing it and Mark in flames. Lavinia finds a tunnel in the hole and descends to try and locate Kate. Elena and Sylvia hear Lavinia scream, but Elena believes the scream came from upstairs, leading Sylvia to investigate.

Sylvia, hearing ghostly violin music, ascends the stairs and sees Daniel outside in the courtyard. After quickly exiting the house to greet him, she finds he has vanished and discovers a bewildered Kate in the empty courtyard pool. The two agree to find the others and escape.

Lavinia emerges from the hole and reunites with the others, realizing Elena has gone missing. Following a trail of blood, they ascend the staircase and find a dying Elena covered in blood. Lavinia recognizes fungus on Elena and says it was found on logs during the 18th century, with the wood being used to make Stradivarius violins. Kate resolves that the only way to rid the house of the curse is to use Paganini's piece as a weapon and plays it on her violin. However, when they attempt to escape the house, they find that the invisible barrier is still in place.

Kate decides the curse could be lifted by playing the piece backwards, but when Kate attempts this, the sheet music electrocutes Lavinia and bursts into flames. Lavinia is then trapped behind an invisible wall and crushed to death. Paganini emerges, stabbing Sylvia with his violin and sealing the unconscious Kate in an empty double bass case. As he plays his violin, Kate awakens inside the case, which catches on fire. The sun rises and emerges through the open window, reducing Paganini to dust and incinerating the sheet music.

Kate exits the house as Sylvia, thought to be dead, arrives by car and explains that, because Kate never played the piece backwards, Paganini's curse will continue. Pickett emerges from the car as Sylvia explains that she was the one who, as a child, murdered her mother in the house, and that she was condemned to relive the experience they just went through eternally. Pickett further explains that all visitors to the house have been condemned to Hell. As a new family arrives, Kate thinks she is free to go, but Pickett explains that he hates people who sell their souls for fame and success and stabs her to death.

== Cast ==
- Daria Nicolodi as Sylvia Hackett
- Jasmine Maimone as Kate
- Pascal Persiano as Daniel
- Maria Cristina Mastrangeli as Lavinia
- Michel Klippstein as Elena
- Pietro Genuardi as Mark Singer
- Luana Ravegnini as Rita
- Giada Cozzi as Sylvia (child)
- Elena Pompei as Sylvia's mother
- Donald Pleasence as Mr. Pickett

== Production ==
The development of Paganini Horror was based on the premise that the film Paganini, a pet project of actor Klaus Kinski, was going to be a great success. Cozzi came up with the title for the film and producer Ugo Valenti hired Enzo Sciotti to illustrate a poster for the film, after which a script began to be developed. Cozzi's original screenplay included references to the violinist Paganini, as well as elements of Cozzi's favourite genre, science fiction. Paganini Horror was originally going to be filmed in Colombia, where Cozzi's previous film, Contamination, had been shot, and the original premise featured a haunted house where time constantly fluctuates, changing a person's age. However, Valenti did not like Cozzi's script, which led to Cozzi continuously changing it until Valenti eventually left the film industry. Cozzi then enlisted Daria Nicolodi to help with the screenplay, borrowing ideas from a television series he had worked on titled Turno di notte.

Cozzi then found producer Fabrizio De Angelis, who expressed his interest in the film. A few days before filming, De Angelis told Cozzi to scrap the gory scenes in the film, as the budget would not allow them, which led to Cozzi rewriting parts of the script to include more fantastical scenes in their place. Cozzi later conveyed his frustration with De Angelis, stating, "There I was with this beautiful ambitious script and they handed me a 16mm camera, gave me a villa to start shooting in and said 'Start Shooting'! In conditions like these, not even the best director in the world could have done any better."

The film was shot in three and a half weeks on location in Venice and at R.P.A. Elios Studios in Rome.

== Release ==
Paganini Horror passed Italian censors on 24 January 1989 and was distributed in Italy by Fulvia Film on 6 June 1989. Film critic and historian Roberto Curti stated that the film performed poorly at the Italian box office.

On 16 September 2019, UK distributor 88 Films released Paganini Horror on Blu-ray, featuring a 2K remaster of the film from the original 16mm camera negative. U.S. distributor Severin Films also released the film on Blu-ray, with the first 3,000 copies including a CD of the film's soundtrack.

== Reception ==
In his book Italian Horror Film Directors, Louis Paul retrospectively noted that "nobody likes Paganini Horror, Cozzi included." In his book Horror and Science Fiction Film IV, Donald C. Willis described the film as having "premises [that] are promisingly absurd, but much of the movie plays like a routine slasher story."

== See also ==
- List of horror films of 1989
- List of Italian films of 1989
