= Behind the Scenes of Total Hell: The Jamie Gunn Chronicles =

- Directed by: Andy Wilton
- Written by: Andy Wilton
- Starring: Grey McCulloch; Sam Smart; Sarah Towndrow; Norman Lovett; Ian McCulloch
- Release date: 22 April 2013
- Country: United Kingdom
- Language: English

Behind the Scenes of Total Hell is a 2013 British independent feature film directed by Andy Wilton and produced by Once Upon A Tyne Productions. It was released globally on 22 April 2013 via internet streaming, DVD and download.

The film is a mockumentary following a fictional director, Jamie Gunn, and his attempts to make a low budget horror movie, Total Hell. The film follows Jamie from his attempts to gain funding right through to the premiere of his film. The 97 minute film had a budget of £1,000.

The film features a narration from Norman Lovett (best known for playing Holly in Red Dwarf) and Ian McCulloch, known for playing Peter West in Zombi 2.

The soundtrack to the film features a large number of UK bands including World is Static, film composer Kasia Middleton, Super Baby Project, Franny Griffiths, The Drellas, Subway Showdown, Dust, Yorkie, Photobooth, Jari Ylamaki, Victoria Geelan, Depot, Igal Gabbay, Red R. R. Tuby, Chris Everard, Wherewithal, The Buzzsonic, Three Shy of Nine, Simon Doherty, Rachel Wallen-James, Mark Lough, Grant Alderson, Jamie Gunn.
