= Massacre Play =

- Directed by: Damiano Damiani
- Written by: Damiano Damiani; Raffaele La Capria
- Starring: Tomas Milian; Elliott Gould
- Cinematography: Gianfranco Transunto
- Music by: Riz Ortolani
- Release date: 1989
- Country: Italy
- Language: Italian

Massacre Play (Italian: Gioco al massacro, also known as The Wounded King) is a 1989 Italian thriller-drama film directed by Damiano Damiani.

== Cast ==
- Tomas Milian as Clem Da Silva
- Elliott Gould as Theo Steiner
- Nathalie Baye as Bella
- John Steiner as Danilo
- Eva Robin's as Rosita
- Galeazzo Benti as Cornelius Plank
- Michael Gothard as Zabo
- Peter Woodthorpe as Straccalino

== See also ==
List of Italian films of 1989
