= Burro (film) =

- Directed by: José María Sánchez
- Written by: Tonino Guerra
- Produced by: Achille Manzotti
- Starring: Renato Pozzetto; Elena Sofia Ricci
- Cinematography: Mario Vulpiani
- Music by: Luis Enríquez Bacalov
- Release date: 1989
- Language: Italian

Burro is a 1989 Italian comedy-drama film written by Tonino Guerra and directed by José María Sánchez.

== Plot ==
The film tells the story of Burro, a boy from Romagna who works in the small cinema of his country. He falls in love with a big screen actress he sees in every woman he meets. With her he will have three "meetings". In the last, the woman will be a gypsy who points out to him the dead father in a dog.

== Cast ==
- Renato Pozzetto as Burro
- Elena Sofia Ricci as Katarina
- Margarita Lozano as Burro's mother
- Pierre Malet as the film actor
- Victor Cavallo as the priest
- Teodoro Corrà as Mustafà

== See also ==
- List of Italian films of 1989
