= Liquid Dreams (film) =

- Directed by: Mark S. Manos
- Starring: Richard Steinmetz; Candice Daly; John Doe; Tracey Walter; Karen Dahl; Mink Stole
- Distributed by: Academy Entertainment
- Release date: June 1, 1992
- Running time: 92 minutes
- Country: United States
- Language: English

Liquid Dreams is a 1991 American erotic thriller starring Candice Daly. Liquid Dreams had some cult film buzz, mainly due to the movie's slight comparisons to the 1983 film Videodrome. The film was screened at the International Critics' Week of the 1991 Cannes Film Festival.

== Plot ==
Set in the near future, Eve Black (Daly) auditions successfully in a futuristic strip club where a movie called Neurovid, Dorothy and the Wizard of Oz is being filmed. Eve has a device put in her ears that turn white to star in a hot movie for her director Ceceil and becomes the latest star of Neurovid and is tested before being filmed. From here, she starts to solve the murder of her sister Tina.
