= Bank Clerks =

1985 film

- Directed by: Pupi Avati
- Starring: Claudio Botosso; Giovanna Maldotti; Dario Parisini; Elena Sofia Ricci
- Cinematography: Pasquale Rachini
- Music by: Riz Ortolani
- Release date: 1985
- Country: Italy
- Language: Italian

Impiegati, internationally released as Bank Clerks, is a 1985 Italian comedy-drama film written and directed by Pupi Avati. It was selected for the Quinzaine des Realisateurs in the 1985 Cannes Film Festival. For her performance Elena Sofia Ricci won a Globo d'oro for Best New Actress.

== Cast ==
- Claudio Botosso: Luigi
- Giovanna Maldotti: Marcella
- Dario Parisini: Dario
- Elena Sofia Ricci: Annalisa
- Luca Barbareschi: Enrico
- Consuelo Ferrara: Valeria
- Gianni Musy: Pozzi
- Cesare Barbetti: Padre di Dario
- Alessandro Partexano: Alex
- Nik Novecento: Usciere
- Marcello Cesena: Bebo
