= Festa =

Festa may refer to:

- Feast day for a Christian saint, in Italian, Portuguese, Galician, and Maltese
- Festa della Repubblica, the Italian National Day and Republic Day
- Festa (surname)
- Festival of Transitional Architecture in Christchurch, New Zealand

== Music ==
- Festa (album), by Ivete Sangalo, or the title song, 2001
- "Festa" (song), by MAX, 2003
