= Pierre Malet =

French actor (born 1955)

- Born: September 3, 1955; France
- Occupation: Actor
- Known for: Basileus Quartet
- Relatives: Laurent Malet (brother)

Pierre Malet (born 3 September 1955 in Bayonne, Pyrénées-Atlantiques) is a French actor.

He is the twin brother of Laurent Malet.

== Filmography ==
- 1976 : Le Siècle des lumières (TV) : A page
- 1976 : Comme un boomerang : Other Feldman's son
- 1976 : Un éléphant ça trompe énormément
- 1977 : Au plaisir de Dieu (feuilleton TV) : Jacques jeune
- 1978 : Un ours pas comme les autres (feuilleton TV)
- 1978 : Kakemono hôtel (TV) : Jean Cagepain
- 1979 : Staline-Trotsky: Le pouvoir et la révolution (TV) : Liova
- 1980 : [[Fantômas (1980 ]film)|Fantômas]] (TV miniseries) : Jérôme Fandor
- 1980 : Le Vol d'Icare (TV) : Icare
- 1981 : Les Fiançailles de feu (TV) : Joss
- 1981 : Confused Feelings (TV film, directed by Étienne Périer) : Roland
- 1981 : Arcole ou la terre promise (feuilleton TV) : Frédéric Dumourier
- 1982 : La Nuit de Varennes : Emile Delage, student revolutionary
- 1982 : L'Amour s'invente (TV) : Pierre Morency
- 1983 : Basileus Quartet : Edo
- 1983 : Capitaine X (feuilleton TV) : François Leroy-Boucher
- 1984 : Mistral's Daughter (TV miniseries) : Eric Avigdor
- 1985 : La Part de l'autre (TV)
- 1985 : L'Ordre (TV)
- 1986 : Francesca è mia
- 1987 : Ubac : Raoul de Marsac
- 1989 : Burro
- 1989 : Mortelle saison (TV) : Marc Palladio
- 1990 : Das Geheimnis des gelben Geparden (TV) : François
- 1993 : Total!
- 1993 : La fièvre monte à El Pao (TV) : Vasquez
- 1995 : Un homme de cœur (TV)
- 2010 : Streamfield, les carnets noirs : Iskander Labade
