= Basileus Quartet =

- Directed by: Fabio Carpi
- Produced by: Fabio Carpi
- Starring: Héctor Alterio; Alain Cuny; Omero Antonutti; Pierre Malet; François Simon
- Cinematography: Dante Spinotti
- Edited by: Massimo Latini
- Release date: 1983
- Country: Italy
- Language: Italian

Basileus Quartet (Italian: Quartetto Basileus) is a 1983 Italian film. It stars actor Gabriele Ferzetti.

== Plot ==
The Basileus Quartet has performed together for over three decades at the cost of ignoring other aspects of life. When one of the group's members dies suddenly the others re-evaluate their lives. Later a young musician tries to get the group back together.

== Cast ==
- Héctor Alterio as Alvaro
- Omero Antonutti as Diego
- Pierre Malet as Edo
- François Simon as Oscar Guarneri
- Michel Vitold as Guglielmo
- Alain Cuny as Finkel
- Gabriele Ferzetti as Mario Cantone
- Véronique Genest as Sophia
- Lisa Kreuzer as Lotte
- Mimsy Farmer as Miss Permamint
- Rada Rassimov as Madame Finkal
- Alessandro Haber

== Accolades ==
The film was nominated for Best Foreign Language Film of 1984 by the U.S. National Board of Review of Motion Pictures.

== Critical reception ==
The New York Times, "Without ever forcing things, Basileus Quartet works so sweetly that, though it is completely conventional, it's almost exotic."

== See also ==
- Italian films of 1983
