= Dark Bar =

- Italian theatrical release poster by Enzo Sciotti
- Dark Bar
- Directed by: Stelio Fiorenza
- Written by: Stelio Fiorenza
- Starring: Marina Suma; Richard Hatch; Barbara Cupisti
- Cinematography: Franco Delli Colli
- Edited by: Emanuele Foglietti
- Music by: Carlo Siliotto
- Production company: Real Film
- Distributed by: CIDIF
- Release date: December 12, 1989 (Italy)
- Running time: 89 minutes
- Country: Italy

Dark Bar is a 1989 Italian crime drama film directed by Stelio Fiorenza (as Stanley Florency) and starring Marina Suma, Richard Hatch and Barbara Cupisti.

== Plot ==
Italy, late 1980s. In a night club called "Dark Bar", where customers are used to consume drugs, a young girl is found dead. Anne, her sister, decides to find out the murderess. It seems her sister was killed because she was trying to blackmail some important person, and now they are after Anne since they think she knows something too.

== Cast ==
- Marina Suma as Anna
- Richard Hatch as Marco
- Barbara Cupisti as Elisabeth
- Alessandra Stordy as Wilma
- Lea Martino as Enza
- Olivia Cupisti as Lubka
- James Sampson as James
- Vincent Regina

== Release ==
The film was released in Italy on December 12, 1989

== See also ==
- List of Italian films of 1989
