= Etoile (film) =

1989 Italian film by Peter Del Monte

- Directed by: Peter Del Monte
- Screenplay by: Peter Del Monte; Franco Ferrini; Sandro Petraglia
- Story by: Peter Del Monte; Sandro Petraglia
- Produced by: Achille Manzotti
- Starring: Jennifer Connelly; Gary McCleery; Laurent Terzieff; Olimpia Carlisi; Charles Durning; Mario Marozzi; Donald Hodson
- Cinematography: Acácio de Almeida
- Edited by: Anna Napoli
- Music by: Jürgen Knieper
- Production companies: Gruppo Bema; Reteitalia
- Distributed by: Aristi Associati
- Release date: 17 March 1989 (Italy)
- Running time: 101 minutes
- Country: Italy
- Languages: Italian; English

Etoile (transl. Star) is a 1989 Italian film directed by Peter Del Monte and starring Jennifer Connelly, Laurent Terzieff, Charles Durning, Olimpia Carlisi, Mario Marozzi, Donald Hodson and Gary McCleery.

The title refers to the French term for the highest ranking principal dancer in a ballet company, similar to a prima ballerina. What follows is a loose retelling of Tchaikovsky's Swan Lake, in which a young American ballerina travels to Hungary in the hopes of joining a prestigious ballet academy, only to fall under the ghostly and sinister influence of its choreographer and director. The film was distributed by Aristi Associati and premiered on March 17 1989, with a limited release outside of Italy. It was awarded The Critic's Award at the 1990 Fantasporto Film Festival in Portugal and was poorly received by Italian critics.

== Plot ==
American ballerina, Claire Hamilton, travels to Budapest to audition for a prestigious ballet school. She befriends a fellow American and antiques dealer, Jason Forrest, who is clearly smitten. At her audition, Claire suddenly loses her courage when a visibly distraught dancer is harshly rejected. She comes across the company's old abandoned Brukenthor Theatre where she briefly dances Odette's solo from Swan Lake. Unbeknownst to her she is observed by the company's director and choreographer, Marius Balakin, who recognises her as "Natalie." Later, she meets up with Jason and confesses she bailed on her audition, but he encourages her to give it a second chance. They explore an old abandoned estate which seems to have belonged to a ballerina many, many years ago. After a date, Jason agrees to go with Claire to her audition the next morning and they share a kiss. Back at her hotel room, Claire is perplexed to find a bouquet of black roses on her bed, along with a card reading "Welcome back, Natalie." That night, the ballet mistress and the company's ballerino steal into her room while she sleeps and he kisses her, putting her under a trance.

The next morning Jason finds a letter from Claire explaining that she is returning home. However, while at the airport, Claire unknowingly signs her name as Natalie Horvath and is taken back to The Brukenthor by Marius' valet, Karl, where a production of Swan Lake is undergoing rehearsal. Meanwhile, Jason is despondent about Claire's departure, but when he sees her at the park he confused by her sudden, strange behaviour, namely that she doesn't seem to recognise him and that she states her name is Natalie. He is further perplexed when she mentions dancing Swan Lake at The Brukenthor, despite it being in disuse for many years. Later, Natalie finds a photograph of her and Jason which seems to trigger Claire's memory. She attempts to meet him at his hotel but is thwarted by Marius, who burns the photograph.

Jason comes across a portrait of Marius at an auction dated 1891. Upon closer inspection he notices an advertisement in the background for a production of Swan Lake, promoting Natalie Horvath, the company's principal dancer. Further investigation reveals that Natalie had inexplicably fled from The Brukenthor and was killed in a carriage accident the night she was due to perform. It is ambiguous as to whether Claire is being influenced by the ghosts of the company into believing she is Natalie, or if she is possessed by her spirit. In an attempt to get rid of Jason, the ballet mistress seduces Jason's uncle, Joshua. The next morning he frantically tries to force him to return to America with him but is injured in a car accident, before warning him about Marius' plan to perform Swan Lake that night.

Jason returns to the theatre to rescue Claire where she seduces him, before attempting to kill him, but is unable to do so when he declares he loves her. Jason witnesses Claire dance in front of a ghostly audience from the wings while evading Karl. He comes across Marius' journal detailing histories of ritualistic dance, along with his plan to choreograph a version of Swan Lake, in which the evil sorcerer Rothbart kills both Odette and Siegfreid, which would result in Claire being killed on stage as a sacrifice (it is vaguely implied that this was Natalie's reason for attempting to flee the night she was killed). He again tries to plead with her to leave with him but she knocks him out. Jason is later captured by Karl who locks him up in a cellar of the theatre. He escapes and is attacked by a monstrous black swan (implied to be the source of Marius' power). Jason manages to kill it by stabbing it with a shard of broken glass from the mirror, thereby killing Marius and freeing Claire from his influence, just as he is about to stab her. Claire gradually awakens in Jason's arms and the two depart the theatre.

== Cast ==
- Jennifer Connelly as Claire Hamilton / Natalie Horvath. A young ballerina from New York who falls under the sinister influence of a mysterious haunted ballet company.
- Gary McCleery as Jason Forrest. A young American antiques dealer who falls in love with Claire.
- Laurent Terzieff as Marius Balakin, the ballet company's director and choreographer.
- Olimpia Carlisi as the ballet mistress, simply referred to as "Madam."
- Charles Durning as Joshua, Jason's uncle.
- Donald Hodson as Karl, Marius' valet.
- Mario Marozzi the company's ballerino, he is vaguely implied to have been Natalie's lover.

== Production ==
Following the release of the science fiction film Julia and Julia, director Peter Del Monte followed up the film with another in the fantastique genre. The producer Achille Manzotti provided the director with a cast that included the then seventeen year old Jennifer Connelly, who had previously worked with Dario Argento in Phenomena four years prior, Gary McCleery, and Charles Durning. Filming began in Budapest and Italy in 1988 under the working title of Ballerina.

== Release and Reception ==
Etoile was distributed theatrically in Italy by Aristi Associati and released on March 17 1989. According to Italian critic and historian Roberto Curti, the film was "ravaged" by Italian critics. Maurizio Porro of Corriere della Sera stated the film appeared to resemble a remake of Dario Argento's Opera "without suspense". Porro commented that the film was "confused and not at all fascinating" declaring it Del Monte's worst film. However, the film was awarded the Critic's Award at the 1990 Fantasporto Film Festival in Portugal, and has since gained some recognition among Jennifer Connelly's fans, with many regarding it as a precursor to Darren Aronofsky’s Black Swan, while also bearing some similarities to films such as The Red Shoes, Suspiria, and The Phantom of the Opera.

== See also ==
- List of Italian films of 1989
