= The Tunnel Under the World (film) =

The Tunnel under the World
- Italian film poster
- Ital:Il Tunnel Sotto il Mondo
- Directed by: Luigi Cozzi
- Screenplay by: Alfredo Castelli; Tito Monego
- Story by: Frederik Pohl
- Based on: "The Tunnel under the World" by Frederik Pohl
- Starring: Alberto Moro; Bruno Salviero; Anna Mantovani; Lello Maraniello; Gretel Fehr
- Cinematography: Piergiorgio Pozzi
- Edited by: Luigi Cozzi
- Music by: Claudio Calzolari
- Production company: Idea Film
- Distributed by: Idea Film
- Release date: 1969 (Trieste Festival Internazionale del Film di Fantascienza)
- Running time: 70 minutes
- Country: Italy
- Language: Italian

The Tunnel Under the World (original Italian title Il tunnel sotto il mondo) is a 1969 low-budget Italian science-fiction film directed and edited by Luigi Cozzi inspired by Frederik Pohl's 1955 short story of the same name. The screenplay was written by Tito Monego and Alfredo Castelli, best known as the creator of the comic book series Martin Mystère.

It was the directorial debut of a 21-year-old Luigi Cozzi. It began as a film school project and eventually wound up becoming a full-length feature film. Cozzi's work on this film brought him to the attention of famed horror film director Dario Argento and jump-started his career.

== Cast ==
- Alberto Moro
- Bruno Salviero
- Anna Mantovani
- Lello Maraniello
- Gretel Fehr
- Isabel Karalson
- Pietro Rosati
- Ivana Monti
- Luigi Cozzi

== Release ==
It was shown at the Trieste Festival Internazionale del Film di Fantascienza in 1969.

== See also ==
- List of films featuring time loops
