= Luigi Petrucci =

Italian actor

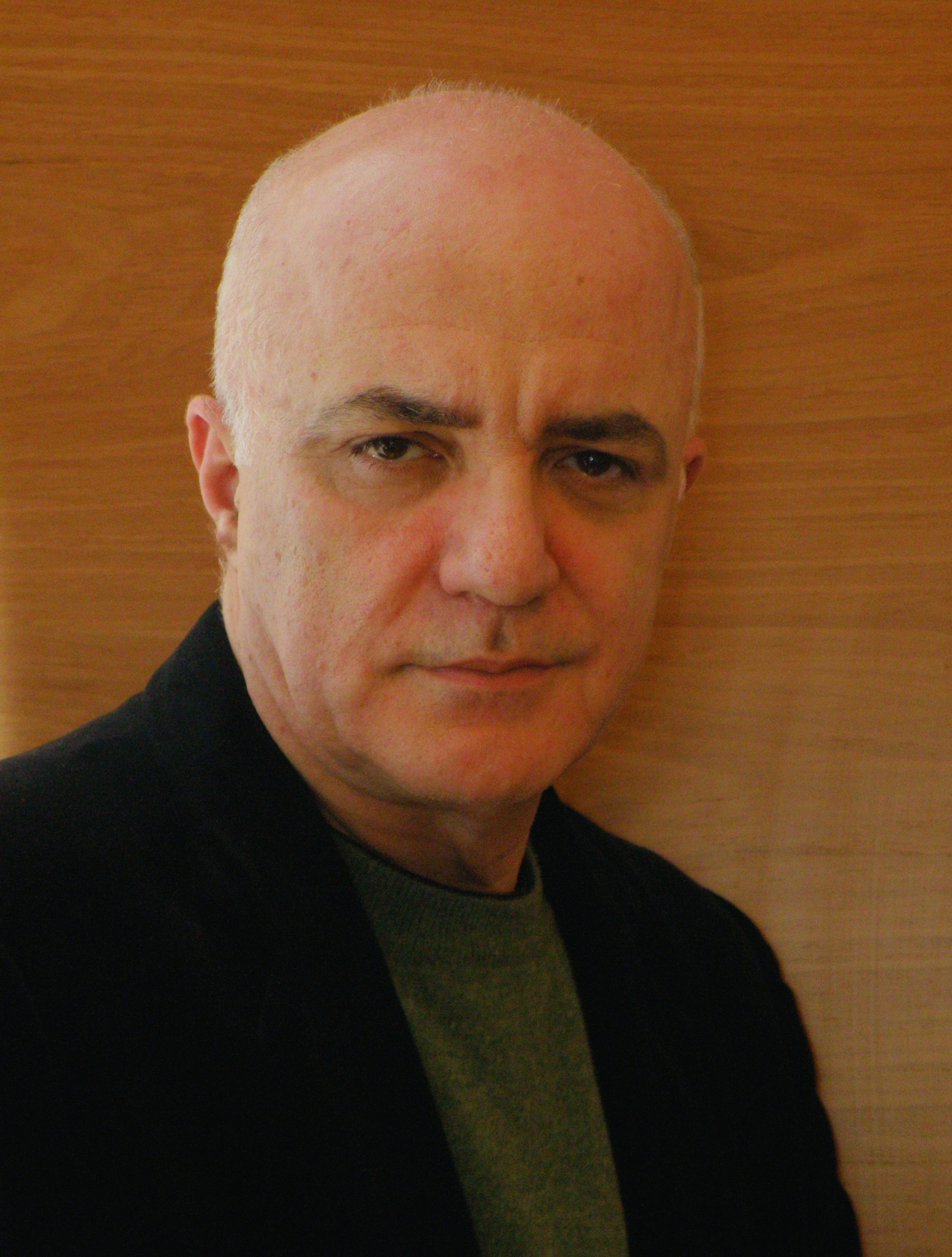
- Petrucci in 2010
- Born: 13 September 1956 (age 69); Naples, Italy
- Height: 1.75 m (5 ft 9 in)

Luigi Petrucci (born 13 September 1956) is an Italian film and television actor.

== Life and career ==
Born in Naples, at young age Petrucci studied singing, piano and guitar, and he started his professional acting career on stage, where he worked with the companies of Eduardo De Filippo, Carlo and Aldo Giuffrè, Nino Taranto and Dolores Palumbo, among others. He made his film debut in 1981, and had his breakout with the role of Postiglione in Carlo Verdone's Compagni di scuola.

== Filmography ==
- Blues metropolitano (1984, directed by Salvatore Piscicelli)
- L'amara scienza (1985)
- Italian Fast Food (1986, directed by Lodovico Gasparini)
- Compagni di scuola (1988, directed by Carlo Verdone)
- Supysaua (1988, directed by Enrico Coletti)
- Il bambino e il poliziotto (1989, directed by Carlo Verdone)
- Matilda (1990, directed by Antonietta De Lillo)
- Fantozzi alla riscossa (1990, directed by Neri Parenti, Paolo Villaggio)
- Piedipiatti (1991, directed by Carlo Vanzina)
- Crazy Underwear (1992, directed by Roberto D'Agostino)
- Pacco, doppio pacco e contropaccotto (1993, directed by Nanni Loy)
- Mario il mago (1994, directed by Klaus Maria Brandauer)
- Mollo tutto (1994, directed by José Maria Sanchez)
- Miele dolce amore (1994, directed by Enrico Coletti)
- Le nuove comiche (1994, directed by Neri Parenti)
- La classe non è acqua (1996, directed by Cecilia Calvi)
- Fireworks (1997, directed by Leonardo Pieraccioni)
- Rose e pistole (1997, directed by Carla Apuzzo)
- The Vesuvians (1997, directed by Antonietta De Lillo)
- L'amore non ha confini (1998, directed by Paolo Sorrentino)
- La vespa e la regina (1999, directed by Antonello De Leo)
- La partita - La difesa di Lužin (2000, regia Marleen Gorris)
- Mi sei entrata nel cuore come un colpo di coltello (2000, directed by Cecilia Calvi)
- Three Steps Over Heaven (2004, directed by Luca Lucini)
- Ho voglia di te (2007, directed by Luis Prieto)
- La maschera d'acqua (2007)
- Ci sarà un giorno - Il giovane Pertini (2010)
