= After Death (1989 film) =

1989 film by Claudio Fragasso

- Italian theatrical release poster
- Directed by: Claudio Fragasso
- Screenplay by: Rossella Drudi
- Story by: Rossella Drudi; Maurizio Baglivo
- Starring: Jeff Stryker; Candice Daly
- Cinematography: Luigi Ciccarese
- Edited by: Daniele Alabiso
- Music by: Al Festa
- Production company: Flora Film
- Distributed by: Variety Distribution
- Release date: 1989 (Germany)
- Country: Italy

After Death (Italian: Oltre la Morte) is an Italian zombie film directed by Claudio Fragasso. The film is set on a remote island where a voodoo curse raises the dead from their graves to feast on the flesh of the living. When a boat of explorers—including a young girl who experienced the zombie uprising years earlier—makes an emergency docking on the island, the crew find that their only hope for survival is a protective idol given to the young girl by her mother years ago.

== Plot ==
Researchers at a remote jungle island outpost discover the natives are practicing voodoo and black magic. They kill a local priest (James Sampson), who has opened a gate to hell in retribution for tests that were being performed on locals (including his daughter who died of cancer). This portal causes the dead to rise and the researchers on the island are killed, except for Jenny (Candice Daly), the daughter of a scientist couple. She escapes, protected by a magical necklace charm given to her by her mother shortly before her death.

She returns years later as an adult with a group of mercenaries (Tommy, Dan, Maddis 'Mad', Rod, and Rod's girlfriend Louise) to try to uncover what happened to her parents. Shortly after arriving at the island, their boat's engine dies, stranding them. The mercenaries encounter their first zombie then Tommy, for some reason, runs the zombie down and starts pummelling it. He is subsequently bitten and starts turning. Meanwhile, elsewhere on the island, a trio of hikers – Chuck, David, and Valerie – discover the cave that leads to the underground temple where the hellgate was originally opened. After accidentally reviving the curse that raises the dead, said dead return to kill any who trespass on their island. The zombies kill David and Valerie while Chuck escapes.

Jenny and the mercenary group take shelter in the remains of the old research facilities' medical quarters, they are soon joined by Chuck (Jeff Stryker), the only surviving hiker. Arming themselves with weapons left behind by the long-dead research team, they make their stand as the dead once again rise. Louise is turned into a zombie by a bite from Tommy. She then turns Rod, who becomes our first gun-wielding zombie. Rod bites Mad - resulting in him becoming bed-ridden and later turning into a zombie. Still armed with his assault rifle, Mad shoots Dan repeatedly - mortally wounding him. Surrounded by zombies, Dan blows up the facility via a stockpile of grenades that appears suddenly, while Jenny and Chuck flee. They stumble upon the cave/temple again, where the zombies appear and attack. Chuck is killed, as Jenny throws her necklace charm into the hellgate to 'sacrifice her soul' and ends up being transformed into a zombie.

== Cast ==
- Jeff Stryker as Chuck (credited as Peyton Chuck)
- Candice Daly as Jenny
- Massimo Vanni as David, Chuck's friend (credited as Alex McBride)
- Jim Gaines as Dan
- Don Wilson as Tommy
- Adrianne Joseph as Louise, Rod's girlfriend
- Jim Moss as Mad
- Nick Nicholson as Rod
- James Sampson as The Voodoo Priest (uncredited)
- Fausto Lombardi as Head Scientist (uncredited)
- Alberto Dell'Acqua as Scientist who shoots The Voodoo Priest (uncredited)
- Ottaviano Dell'Acqua as 3rd Scientist (uncredited)
- Claudio Fragasso as The Narrator (voice) (uncredited)
- Romano Puppo as Zombie Leader
- Luciano Pigozzi (credited as Alan Collins) as Doctor
- Maurizio Cerantola as The Balladeer (voice) (uncredited)

== Production ==
Director Claudio Fragasso's wife, Rosella Drudi did not receive credit for the story for Zombi 3, but is credited as the sole author of the screenplay credit for After Death. The film stars bisexual adult actor Jeff Stryker. The film was his first non-pornography role. The remaining majority of the cast were English-speaking performers, but their voices were dubbed in post-production.

The film was predominantly shot on location in the Philippines, with the earliest scenes in the film shot in studios in Rome. Fragasso stated the film was made under duress during shooting in the Philippines, where he remained awake through the entire two-week shoot of the film. Fragasso referred to After Death as the "last gasp" of the Italian zombie gore film.

== Release ==
After Death passed Italian censorship on 13 April 1989. The film was distributed by Variety Film in Italy.

It was released in Germany on home video in 1989 in a heavily edited form. After Death was retitled Zombie 4 by its Japanese video distributors, but the title never appears on any print of the film. It was also released under the title Zombie Flesh Eaters 3.

== Reception ==
In a retrospective review in Video Watchdog, After Death was described as having a "rousing opening sequence" but the story was critiqued for being "superficial and by-the-numbers even by the subgenre standards" and having an "incoherent ending". In his book Horror and Science Fiction Film IV, Donald C Willis described the film as "flat" and "elementary" and commented that it was an imitation of the films of George A. Romero. Glenn Kay commented in the book Zombies: The Ultimate Guide that the film was "so atrocious and nonsensical that one finds it impossible to believe it has any connection to Romero's zombie classic."

== Footnotes ==
=== References ===
- Kay, Glenn (2008). Zombie Movies: The Ultimate Guide. Chicago Review Press. ISBN 978-1569766835.
- Willis, Donald C. (1997). Horror and Science Fiction Films IV. Scarecrow Press. ISBN 0-8108-3055-8.
