= Ne parliamo Lunedì =

- Directed by: Luciano Odorisio
- Written by: Laura Toscano; Franco Marotta; Luciano Odorisio
- Produced by: Augusto Caminito
- Starring: Andrea Roncato; Elena Sofia Ricci
- Cinematography: Carlo Cerchio
- Edited by: Carlo Bartolucci
- Music by: Luigi Ceccarelli
- Production companies: Scena International; Reteitalia
- Distributed by: Titanus
- Release date: 2 February 1990 (Italy)
- Running time: 100 minutes
- Country: Italy
- Language: Italian

Ne parliamo Lunedì (transl. We’ll Talk About It on Monday) is a 1990 Italian erotic dark comedy film directed by Luciano Odorisio. For this film, Elena Sofia Ricci was awarded with a David di Donatello for Best Actress and with a Ciak d'oro in the same category.

== Cast ==
- Andrea Roncato as Marcello
- Elena Sofia Ricci as Alma
- Francesco Scali as Giogiò
- Sebastiano Nardone as Nico
