= The Church (1989 film) =

- Original Italian film poster
- Italian: La Chiesa
- Directed by: Michele Soavi
- Screenplay by: Dario Argento; Franco Ferrini; Michele Soavi
- Story by: Dario Argento; Franco Ferrini; Dardano Sacchetti
- Produced by: Dario Argento; Mario Cecchi Gori; Vittorio Cecchi Gori
- Starring: Tomas Arana; Feodor Chaliapin; Hugh Quarshie; Barbara Cupisti; Antonella Vitale; Asia Argento
- Cinematography: Renato Tafuri
- Edited by: Franco Fraticelli
- Music by: Keith Emerson; Philip Glass; Goblin
- Production companies: ADC; Cecchi Gori Group Tiger Cinematografica; Reteitalia
- Distributed by: Columbia Tri-Star Films Italia
- Release date: 10 March 1989 (Italy)
- Running time: 100 minutes
- Country: Italy
- Budget: $3.5 million
- Box office: 1.926 billion Italian lire

The Church (Italian: La Chiesa) is a 1989 Italian supernatural horror film directed by Michele Soavi, from a screenplay co-written with Dario Argento and Franco Ferrini, and produced by Argento with Mario and Vittorio Cecchi Gori. It stars Hugh Quarshie, Tomas Arana, Barbara Cupisti, Asia Argento, Feodor Chaliapin, Jr. and Giovanni Lombardo Radice.

The film involves a church built upon the site of slain peasants and their mass grave. The church is designed by an architect who was buried alive with his creation, who created a device to seal off all entrances if the spirits of the church ever tried to get revenge. In the modern day, the cathedral's new librarian Evan investigates the crypt of the church and removes a seal which allows the demonic forces to attack the church occupants.

The Church was originally conceived as the third installment in the Dèmoni series, following Demons (1985) and Demons 2 (1986). Soavi insisted the film to be distant from the series, wanting it to be more sophisticated in style, and re-wrote the screenplay to remove any connection to the series. Filming was primarily shot in the Matthias Church in Budapest and on-location in Hamburg, with additional footage filmed at studio sets in Rome.

== Plot ==
In medieval Germany, a band of Teutonic Knights massacre a village of devil worshippers and bury their bodies underground, building a Gothic cathedral over the mass grave as a means to contain the demonic evil within.

In the present day, the cathedral's new librarian Evan arrives for his first day on the job. He meets Lisa, an artist supervising a restoration of the church's elaborate frescoes, who introduces him to the surly Bishop and the kindly Father Gus. The Bishop warns Evan not to enter the church's catacombs, nominally due to their instability.

Lisa soon discovers a mysterious parchment carrying what resemble architectural schematics. With the help of Evan, they sneak the parchment back to Lisa's home. As the two bond over their mutual interest in medieval art and architecture, they have sex. It is halted when Evan has a sudden realization and finds hidden Latin text on the parchment referring to a "stone with seven eyes".

Evan later explores the catacombs to find the stone. Evan uncovers the stone in a hidden crypt; on opening it, the crypt reveals a vast, seemingly endless black void. A blue light radiates from the hole and reveals a sack. On opening it, Evan is grabbed by hands from the inside before he blacks out. When he regains consciousness, the sack and hands are gone, and his wrists are bleeding. As Evan flees a sacristan who is investigating for intruders, Evan flees, loses control of his hands, and tears out his still-beating heart and bites into it. At home, Lisa experiences dreams of the unsealed hole and a vast, candle-filled atrium. When awake, she is attacked by a goat-headed demon and flees in terror. Returning home, the sacristan begins experiencing the same symptoms as Evan.

The next day, Lisa goes to Evan's office, where he is acting strangely. He tries to sexually assault her and she flees, shocked and horrified. Evan likewise menaces the sacristan's daughter Lotte, with whom he'd previously been amiable. Evan and the sacristan both become increasingly disheveled and violent. Lotte flees her apartment. Having a moment of clarity, the sacristan rushes to the confession booth, and tells Father Gus that he has become demonically possessed and fears losing control. To Gus' horror, he rushes to the cellar and kills himself with a jackhammer. His death triggers security mechanisms that cause the church to seal shut, trapping everyone inside. The occupants begin experiencing increasingly elaborate and deadly visions. As the occupants try to find a way out, Gus confronts the aloof Bishop, who reveals that he intends to let the evil inside kill the occupants before being unleashed on what he sees as a corrupt world, before accidentally falling to his death.

Those inside start dying in droves. At a nightclub in town, Lotte senses something wrong and rushes to the church, through a secret passage in the aqueduct. Meanwhile, Lisa enters into a trance and wanders into the cellar, finding herself in the same candlelit atrium of her dreams. She lies atop an altar and is raped by Evan, who is now fully transformed into a goat-headed demon.

Searching the Bishop's office, Gus finds the ancient records recounting the church's creation. Lotte enters, and upon sees someone who resembles her in a woodcut depicting the massacre. Suddenly flooded with memories from centuries prior, she reveals that the church's architect was left to die in the church, and that his body contains a self-destruct mechanism for the building. Gus tells Lotte to flee, and he makes his way to the chapel hall as the dead bodies of the massacre victims buried beneath the church slowly begin to rise. Before the evil force can be fully set free, Gus finds the architect's mummified body hidden beneath the floor, and activates the self-destruct mechanism. The building collapses, only Lotte escapes alive.

Lotte later returns the church ruins with flowers. A passing truck uncovers the stone seal and blows it open, which emits blue light from within, leaving her smiling enigmatically.

== Cast ==
- Hugh Quarshie as Father Gus
- Tomas Arana as Evan
- Feodor Chaliapin, Jr. as the Bishop
- Barbara Cupisti as Lisa
- Antonella Vitale as the bridal model
- Giovanni Lombardo Radice as Reverend Dominic
- Asia Argento as Lotte
- Roberto Caruso as Freddie
- Roberto Corbiletto as Hermann
- Alina De Simone as Elke
- Claire Hardwick as Joanna
- Lars Jorgenson as Bruno
- John Karlsen as Heinrich
- Katherine Bell Marjorie as Heinrich's wife
- Olivia Cupisti as Mira
- Gianfranco De Grassi as the accuser
- John Richardson as the architect

Director Michele Soavi makes an uncredited cameo appearance as a police officer.

== Production ==
=== Development and writing ===
In an interview conducted on January 22, 1988, directors Lamberto Bava and Dario Argento were discussing a follow-up to Demons 2 stating that they were working on a follow-up film, with Argento stating it would not be called Demons 3, but potentially Ritorno alla casa dei demoni (transl. Return to the House of the Demons). The third Demons film, whose story was developed by Franco Ferrini and Dardano Sacchetti, involves a group of passengers that find themselves on a volcanic island after their airplane is forced to make an emergency landing. Sacchetti explained that the situation was for them to arrive in a "weird hell" and compared the film to Alien, but with the isolated place being an airplane opposed to a spaceship and the demons replacing the aliens. After developing several drafts, the writers abandoned the story with Sacchetti stating that they had trouble creating a story set in an isolated area of the airplane. The screenwriters eventually developed a new screenplay set in a church which acted as a passage into hell. Argento would later state that The Church "was never Demons 3, nobody but Lamberto ever wanted to make Demons 3; I didn't want it, the studio didn't want it, nobody wanted it."

The decision of re-starting the screenplay from the beginning led to Bava leaving the project as he began working on a set of television films in October 1988. This led to director Michele Soavi to enter production as the director, right after he had completed his film Stage Fright. Soavi was surprised at Bava leaving the project, stating "I couldn't be he had worked on it for so long and didn't want to complete the project." Soavi made some changes to the script, including a new opening scene influenced by John Milius' film Conan the Barbarian. Soavi declared that he "loved the first part, but in the middle it was a little silly, so I got together with Franco Ferrini and worked on it to make it stronger." Shooting of the film took place from September to November 1988 with a budget of three and a half million dollars.

Soavi has derisively referred to the Demons films as "Pizza Schlock", and expressed that he wanted The Church to be more sophisticated. In an interview with Cinefantastique, Soavi explained that he wished to move beyond with his creations following the film's release, and because of that he parted ways with Argento, ending their long-time creative partnership.

=== Filming ===
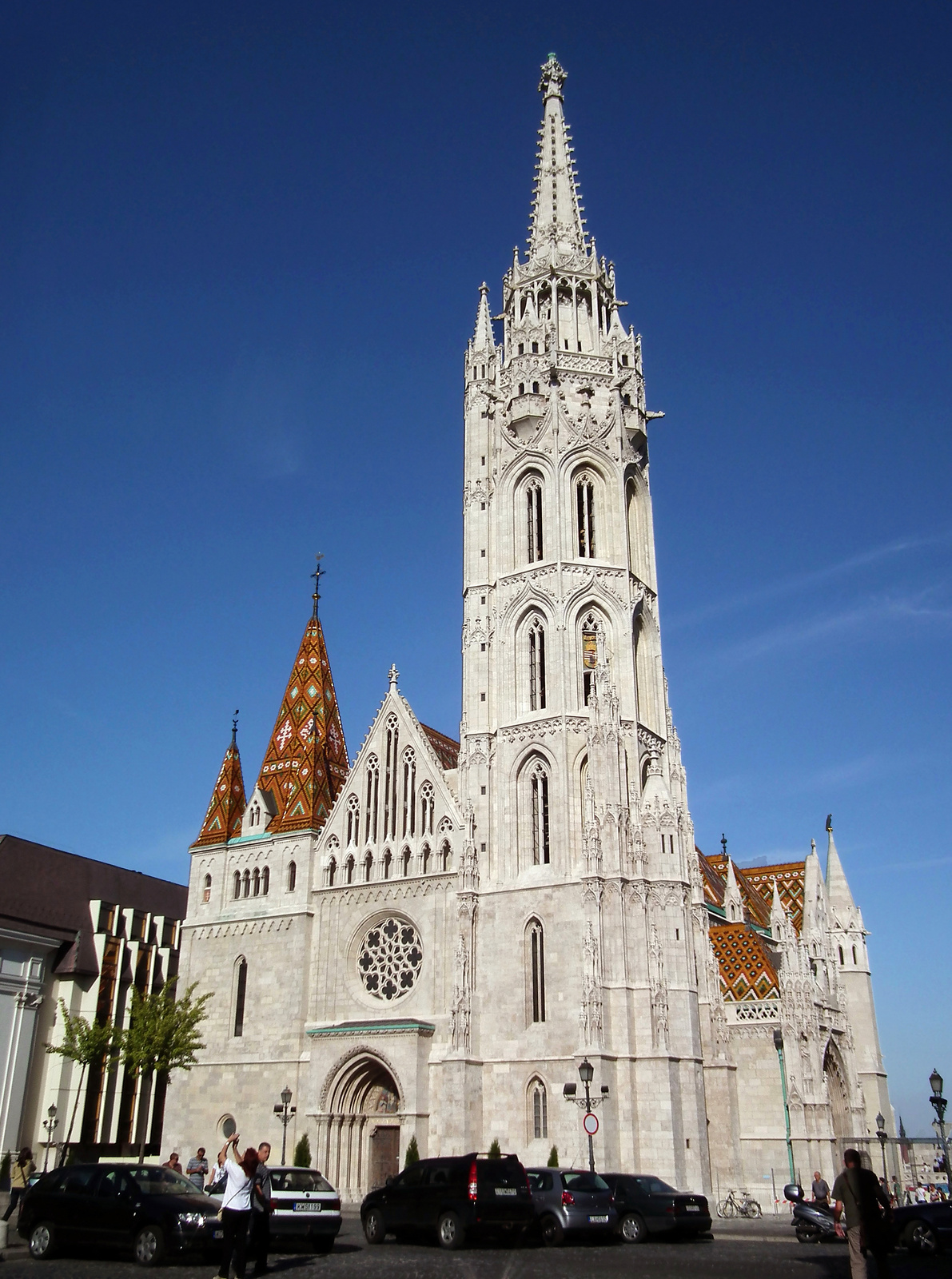
Matthias Church in Budapest.

On finding the appropriate church for the film, Argento stated they looked throughout Europe: Italy, France, Germany and Switzerland and found that nobody wanted them to shoot in their church due to the nature of the film. Finding it easier to shoot in Eastern Europe, the crew explored Czechoslovakia, Hungary and Bulgaria eventually settling on a Church in Hungary.

The church scenes were filmed at Matthias Church and St. Elizabeth's Church in Budapest, and the Church of St. Mary of the Visitation in Rome. Exteriors were filmed on-location in Budapest and Hamburg. The remains of St. Nicholas Church, Hamburg (destroyed since 1943) were used for the closing scene. The rest of the film was shot on sets at both Elios and De Paolis studios in Rome. Soavi described his filming experience as exhausting, noting that he "was free, and I could do what I wanted... but I also suffered a lot because of the difficulties, the vicissitudes, the delays."

Typically of an Italian production of the time, the film was shot MOS (without sync sound) and all dialogue was dubbed in later. English-speaking actors Hugh Quarshie and Tomas Arana recorded their own dialogue, while the rest of the mostly-Italian cast were dubbed by others.

=== Music ===
While preparing for the film, Argento learned that Keith Emerson would be interested in writing the score, having worked with him previously on Inferno. He received his 12-track demo which Argento did not like: "They were terrible. Not even a child would have written music like that. A sort of bombastic march, it sound like the Carabinieri fanfare." Only three tracks by Emerson were used in the film: an organ-driven main title theme, a track titled "Possession" and a rearranged version of Bach's Prelude 24. For the rest of the score, Soavi inserted two tracks by Philip Glass and relied on his usual collaborators Goblin.

== Release ==
The Church was distributed theatrically in Italy by Cecchi Gori in Italy on 10 March 1989. The film grossed a total of 1,926,277,000 Italian lire domestically. The film was the 36th top grossing film in Italy that year with Italian film historian and critic stating its gross diminished as the film rating board gave the film a F.M.18 certificate for "the many, particularly violent and shocking scenes which are considered unsuitable for the sensitivity of the spectators in developmental age." In comparison, the biggest film of the year in Italy was Roberto Benigni's Il piccolo diavolo which grossed 17 billion Italian lire. One year later, the film commission overturned the previous ruling and considered the films "violent and shocking scenes" as "...not particularly and intensely underlined within the general context of the film" and changed the rating to V.M.14.

The film was released in the United States on August 22, 1990 where it was distributed by TriStar Pictures.

=== Critical response ===
In a contemporary review, Variety referred to the film as a "technically proficient but empty horror exercise", praising the score by Goblin.

On review aggregator website Rotten Tomatoes, it holds an approval rating of 64% based on 11 reviews. Jason Buchanan of AllMovie gave the film a three star out of five rating, referring to it as a "gothic-drenched apocalyptic nightmare" that builds "a suffocating sense of quiet dread".

== Footnotes ==
=== Sources ===
- Binion, Cavett. "The Church (1989)". AllMovie. Archived from the original on July 26, 2012.
- Buchanan, Jason. "The Church". AllMovie. Archived from the original on July 30, 2012.
- Curti, Roberto (2019). Italian Gothic Horror Films, 1980-1989. McFarland. ISBN 978-1476672434.
- McDonagh, Maitland (1992). "Sects & Violence". Gorezone. No. 21.
- Prouty, Howard H., ed. (1994). Variety Television Reviews 1923-1992. Garland Publishing Inc. ISBN 0-8240-3796-0.
