= Jeff Stryker =

American pornographic actor

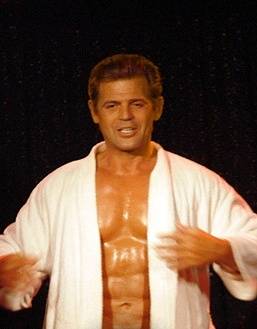
- Stryker in 2007
- Born: Charles Casper Peyton; August 21, 1962 (age 64); Carmi, Illinois, U.S.
- Height: 5 ft 9 in (1.75 m)

Jeff Stryker (born Charles Casper Peyton; August 21, 1962) is an American pornographic actor who has starred in bisexual, gay and straight adult films as well as acting in mainstream movies. He lives in California.

== Early life ==
Jeff Stryker grew up in Springfield, Illinois. His father was a car salesman and his mother was a nurse.

== Pre-film career ==
Jeff Stryker worked as a stripper and delivered balloon-o-grams before a local photographer sent shots of him to gay adult film director John Travis in California.

== Film career and sexuality ==
Stryker is primarily known as a performer in gay pornography films, although Jamie Loves Jeff was one of the biggest-selling heterosexual adult movies of all time for its producer, Vivid Entertainment. He describes himself (in a somewhat joking fashion) as sexually "universal". He has also said, "I don't define myself as anything."

He has also worked as a non-pornographic actor, starring in a 1989 Italian-produced horror film called After Death (Revenge of the Zombies), in which he was credited as Chuck Peyton. Later in the American DVD release, the name Jeff Stryker was used as well. A trailer interview was added with Stryker describing the experience he had while shooting this movie in Manila. Stryker also starred in the short film by German cult director Rosa von Praunheim Can I Be Your Bratwurst, Please?. Stryker also appeared in a 1995 German television movie The Black Curse starring James Brolin, as well as the 1988 Italian feature Dirty Love.

== Awards and tributes ==
- AVN Hall of Fame inductee
- GayVN Hall of Fame inductee
- 2000 Grabby Wall of Fame inductee
- 2004 Hustler Porn Walk of Fame
- 1986 XRCO Best Actor (Gay)
- Stryker was featured in a 1991 portrait by artists Pierre et Gilles.

== Merchandising ==
The Jeff Stryker Cock and Balls, a dildo fashioned from a cast of his penis, is widely sold in sex stores. The sex toy is notable not only for being popular, but also because Stryker and the manufacturer of the item litigated for the rights to its likeness as part of Stryker's intellectual property. The case eventually reached a mutually acceptable resolution. In a 1999 Salon article written by Jeff Stryker, a New York journalist and the porn actor's namesake, the dildo is even described as an object of higher culture. It was mentioned in Allan Gurganus' 1997 novel Plays Well with Others, where the novel's narrator cleans up a closet filled with dildos, the premium find being "a Jeff Stryker, a monster, but somehow Roman in its genial fluted civic beauty."

Stryker has released a country music album titled Wild Buck (1995). In 2003, he released a limited edition anatomically correct action figure of himself.

== Reaction from other celebrities ==
- Filmmaker and author John Waters called Jeff Stryker "the Cary Grant of porno".
- American comedian Margaret Cho's routines involve her love for his pornographic films. In her show Assassin, she discusses in detail the many places one can use the dildo. Stryker had given Cho his commercially produced action figure.

== Stage shows ==
Stryker appeared in A Sophisticated Evening with Jeff Stryker in Los Angeles, Summer 2006 and in Provincetown, Massachusetts, Summer 2007. The show was produced by comedy writer Bruce Vilanch. In the show, Stryker performed a comic monologue about his life and adventures in adult films, conducted a "porn acting demo" comedy skit with an audience member, and danced in a nude finale where he greeted the audience.

From 1999 through 2001, Stryker performed in a stage show called Hard Time, a comedy send-up of gay porn prison films. In the finale, Stryker danced nude. After the play, Stryker met with the audience at the door. The show toured several cities including New York, San Francisco, Chicago, San Diego and Houston.

== Selected filmography ==
=== Gay and solo ===
- Jeff Stryker Does Hard Time 2001
- Stryker 2000 solo/masturbation
- Jeff Stryker’s Underground 1997
- Santa’s Cummin’! 1996 solo/masturbation
- J.S. Big Time 1995
- The Tease 1994 solo/masturbation
- How to Enlarge Your Penis 1993 solo/masturbation
- 10 Plus 1992 solo/masturbation
- 10 Plus Volume 2 1992 solo/masturbation
- Busted 1991
- In Hot Pursuit 1991
- Powertool 2: Breaking Out
- Just You & Me 1990 solo/masturbation
- On the Rocks 1990
- Stryker’s Best: Powerful Sex 1989
- The Look 1987
- Stryker Force 1987
- In Hot Pursuit 1987
- Powerfull 2 1987
- Powertool 1986
- Bigger Than Life 1986

=== Straight ===
- Stryker/Ryker in "RAW"
- Jamie Loves Jeff
- Cummin' Together
- Dreaming of You
- Heiress
- Jamie Loves Jeff 2
- Cyberstud
- Jeff Stryker's Favorite Sexual Positions 1992
- Milk and Honey
- Take Me
- The Rebel
- The Giant
- In Your Wildest Dreams

=== Bisexual ===
- The Switch Is On 1987
- Every Which Way 1990

=== Other/non-porn ===
- Can I Be Your Bratwurst, Please? 1999 comedy short by Rosa von Praunheim
- After Death (also known as Zombie 4: After Death) 1989
- Dirty Love 1988
- Circus of Books, a 2019 documentary by Rachel Mason, features an interview with Stryker. The film focuses on the Los Angeles bookstores and porn shops Circus of Books, operated by Karen Mason and Barry Mason. Stryker worked with the Masons and did book and video signings at the shop.

Awards
Preceded by Derek Cameron & Kurt Young for Tradewinds	AVN Awards for Best Sex Scene-Gay Video (with Derek Cameron) for Jeff Stryker's Underground; 1998	Succeeded by Mike Branson & Tom Chase for California Kings

== See also ==
- List of male performers in gay porn films
