= Sinbad of the Seven Seas =

1989 film by Luigi Cozzi, Enzo G. Castellari

- Theatrical poster
- Directed by: Enzo G. Castellari; Luigi Cozzi (uncredited)
- Screenplay by: Enzo G. Castellari; Tito Carpi
- Story by: Luigi Cozzi
- Based on: Sinbad the Sailor from One Thousand and One Nights
- Produced by: Enzo G. Castellari; Yoram Globus; Menahem Golan
- Starring: Lou Ferrigno
- Narrated by: Daria Nicolodi
- Cinematography: Blasco Giurato
- Edited by: Gianfranco Amicucci
- Music by: Dov Seltzer
- Distributed by: Cannon Film
- Release date: 1 April 1989
- Running time: 93 minutes
- Countries: Italy; United States
- Languages: English, Italian

Sinbad of the Seven Seas is a 1989 Italian fantasy film produced and directed by Enzo G. Castellari from a story by Luigi Cozzi, revolving around the adventures of Sinbad the Sailor. Sinbad must recover five magical stones to free the city of Basra from the evil spell cast by a wizard, which his journey takes him to mysterious islands and he must battle magical creatures in order to save the world.

== Plot ==
The film is narrated by a mother who tells her daughter a bedtime story from a large book: In the city of Basra, the evil vizier Jaffar has clouded the caliph's mind and imprisoned his daughter, Princess Alina in order to marry her. Jaffar has four of the town's five sacred gems sent to dangerous and evil places where they will be carefully guarded by magical forces. Sinbad and his crew arrive at the caliph's palace, only to be captured by the hypnotised soldiers. Jaffar sentences Sinbad's crew to the torture chamber while the mighty sailor is to be locked in a pit full of snakes. Sinbad gets out of the snake pit using some snakes tied together into a rope and later rescues his companions from the torture chamber. As they flee the controlled Basra, Jaffar grants power from evil forces to help him kill Sinbad, this summons an evil cloud over Sinbad's ship and the Legions of Darkness, undead warriors. Together with the help of his friends, Sinbad manages to defeat the undead and the leader.

Sinbad then heads to a mysterious island to seek the help of a wise Oracle, who tells them the location of the four sacred gems of Basra. Then, he sails to an island and finds the gem by himself, he destroys a towering rock monster and retrieves the gem. Jaffar is joined by another ally, Soukra, a sorceress, and they prepare Jaffar's scheming plan. The second gem is on the island of the Amazons, the Amazons hypnotise Sinbad's crew and their leader, Queen Farida takes Sinbad with her. The Bald Cook and Poochie the dwarf save Sinbad, and he retrieves the second gem, the Queen's necklace. Next, Sinbad and his team head to the Isle of the Dead, where they battle Ghost Knights who have risen from the dead to fulfill their destiny. Sinbad goes for the Ghost King while his companions battle the Knights. Jaffar casts Sinbad's ship and his crew in the middle of the sea, leaving the sailor alone on the Isle of the Dead. Jaffar gives life to the Ghost King using his evil powers, and it weakens Sinbad, but he resists and destroys the Ghost King with his own sword and takes the third sacred gem.

Later, Sinbad meets Kira, and her father, Nadir the wizard, two survivors on the Isle of the Dead who came there on a flying balloon. Sinbad agrees to help them get rid of the vicious monsters of the island and is aided by Kira, they encounter a group of ghouls, Sinbad fights them, but they capture Kira. Sinbad rescues Kira, but has to face a terrible monster known as the Lord of Darkness, which is able to fire bolts of energy from its wrists guarding the last sacred gem of Basra, Sinbad defeats the evil creature with the gems he has and retrieves the last one and they, along with Nadir, escape the island on a balloon.

Sinbad meets up with his companions and they go off to face Jaffar, Sinbad's men face off with the soldiers while Sinbad battles Jaffar. The wizard creates an exact Sinbad clone to battle the sailor, but he manages to defeat it. Eventually, Jaffar is captured by Sinbad and Princess Alina is rescued. Peace has been restored to the world with the sacred gems.

== Cast ==
Character	Original actor	English voice
Sinbad	Lou Ferrigno	Richard Epcar
Jaffar	John Steiner	John Steiner
Prince Alì	Roland Wybenga	Unknown
Alina	Alessandra Martines	Wendee Lee
Kira	Stefania Girolami	Unknown
Cantu	Haruhiko Yamanouchi	Dave Mallow
Poochie	Cork Hubbert	Cork Hubbert
Cheropolis The Bald Cook	Yehuda Efroni	Mike Reynolds
Viking	Ennio Girolami	Michael Sorich
Soukra	Teagan	Teagan
Nadir	Leo Gullotta	Unknown
Caliph	Donald Hodson	Unknown
Queen Farida	Melonee Rodgers	Unknown
Captain Machine	Romano Puppo	Michael Sorich
Town Crier	Armando Mac Rory	Unknown
Torture Chamber Keeper	Ted Rusoff	Unknown
Zombie King	Attilio Lo Pinto	Unknown
Jane	Giada Cozzi	Unknown
Narrator	Daria Nicolodi	Unknown

== Production ==
Sinbad of the Seven Seas claims to be based on Edgar Allan Poe's story "The Thousand-and-Second Tale of Scheherazade," though no similarity can be found between its plot and the story. It borrows some elements and characters from the 1940 version of The Thief of Bagdad. The film was made with a largely Italian cast and crew. Like most Italian movies of the era, it was filmed on location without sound equipment and all dialogue and sound effects were dubbed later.

Screenwriter Luigi Cozzi was originally going to direct the film back in 1986 but he was replaced at the last minute by the producers with Enzo G. Castellari. Castellari changed Cozzi's script drastically and several million dollars later, wound up submitting three hours of non-releasable footage to the producer, who shelved the whole project. In 1989, Cozzi was hired back to try to fix up the picture via re-editing and shooting additional scenes, the producer spending an additional half million dollars finishing it.

== Reception and legacy ==
The film's low production values, over-the-top acting, and inept plot have made it a cult favorite among those who enjoy bad cinema for its unintentional humor. Lou Ferrigno has stated during an interview that Sinbad of the Seven Seas was one of his favourite films he made.

The film is listed in Golden Raspberry Award founder John Wilson's book The Official Razzie Movie Guide as one of The 100 Most Enjoyably Bad Movies Ever Made.
