= Luigi Cozzi =

Italian film director and screenwriter

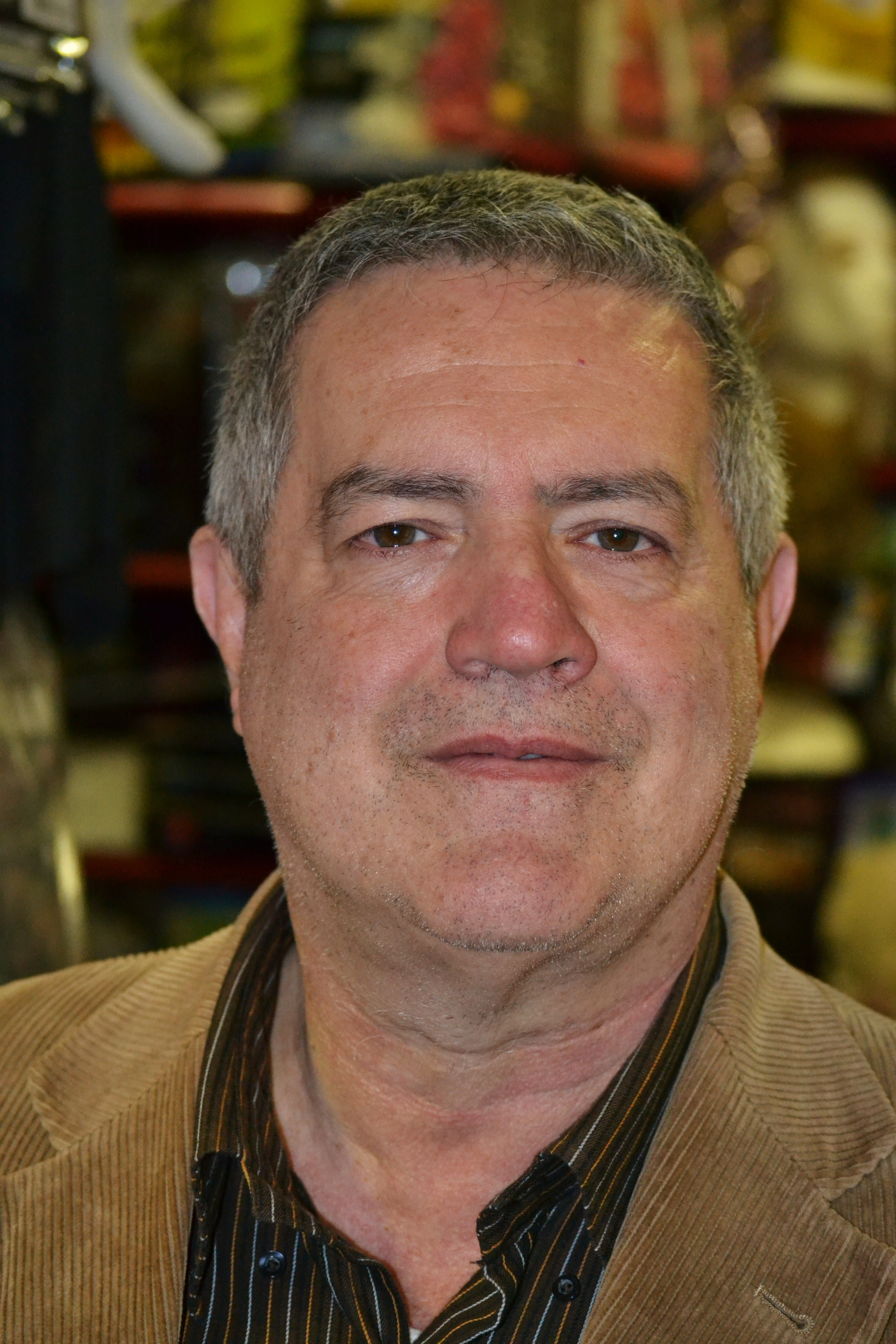
- Cozzi in 2011
- Born: 7 September 1947 (age 79); Busto Arsizio, Italy
- Other name: Lewis Coates
- Occupations: Film director; screenwriter

Signature
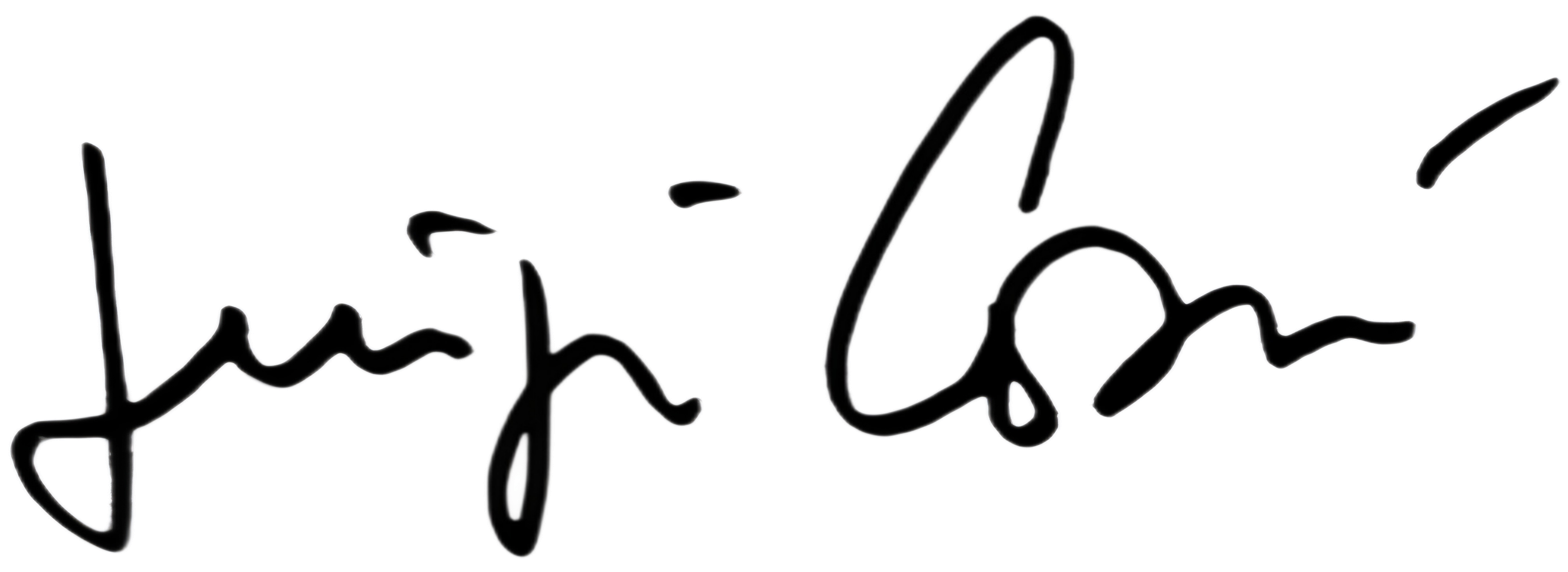

Luigi Cozzi (born 7 September 1947) is an Italian film director and screenwriter. At a young age, Cozzi became a fan of science fiction and began his career as an overseas correspondent for Western film magazines. After directing his first film The Tunnel Under the World, Cozzi befriended director Dario Argento and began working with him in film and television as well as directing his own features including Hercules as well as continuing work with Argento. In the 2010s, he returned to directing with the film Blood on Méliès' Moon.

== Biography ==
=== Early life ===
Luigi Cozzi was born in Busto Arsizio in Italy on 7 September 1947. At a young age, Cozzi made films in 8mm and grew up wanting to be a film director. Cozzi was also a great fan of science fiction, and worked as an overseas correspondent for Western film magazines such as Famous Monsters of Filmland and Photon.

Cozzi's first film The Tunnel Under the World was described by Cozzi as "shot very quickly on a ridiculously low budget." The film features a Martian and a vampire. He befriended director Dario Argento and began working on his screenplay for Four Flies on Grey Velvet, as well as working as an assistant on the film.

=== 1970s ===
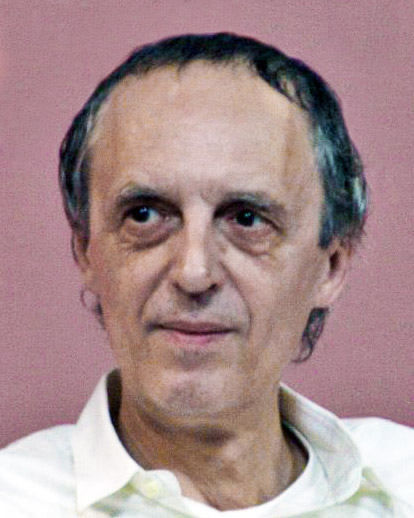
Cozzi contributed to several films directed by Dario Argento (pictured) through his career.

Following work on Four Flies, Cozzi moved to Rome where he worked as a journalist. He continued work with Argento on his film The Five Days and began working in television, writing two episodes ("Eyewitness" and "Neighbor") and directing "Neighbor" for the Door into Darkness television series. His next film made was what Cozzi described as an Argento-styled thriller titled The Killer Must Kill Again. Cozzi's next film project was Take All of Me which he considered his best film. The film is a non-genre film which involves a love story between the failed pianist Richard and the young girl Stella. Cozzi has since attempted to develop new non-science fiction films including The Locomotive and Freshmen but could not get funding for them.

After the success of Star Wars, Cozzi found investors who were willing to fund a larger-scale science fiction film, and began working on a film initially called Empire of the Stars which was later released as Starcrash. Cozzi felt he did not have the budget to compete with Star Wars and decided to give the film a "deliberately crazy look". The film was plagued with production problems ranging from food poisoning on the set and a communist worker revolt which led to the films master copy being held for ransom by Italian activists. Cozzi was about to do a sequel to the film titled Star Riders which would have a $12 million budget from Cannon Films with actors Klaus Kinski, Nancy Kwan and Jack Rabin. The sequel never went into production. Cozzi began expressing his frustration with the Italian film industry, stating in an interview in Cinefantastique that "What can I do? In Italy, when you bring a script to a producer, the first question he asks is not 'What is your film like?' but 'What film is your film like?' That's the way it is in Italy. We can only make Zombi 2, never Zombi I."

Cozzi went on to direct The Humanoid starring Richard Kiel, taking over for Aldo Lado. The film is credited to George B. Lewis and was not released in the United States after American International Pictures turned down the finished film. Cozzi began working on a new film titled Alien Contamination which producers agreed to finance on the condition that the film would resemble Alien. After another Italian film titled Alien 2 on Earth was released, the producers took a title from the uncompleted Lucio Fulci film Contamination: Atomic Project and applied the word "Contamination" to the title. The film was shot in eight weeks on a budget of $800,000.

Cozzi also oversaw the release of an edited version of the kaiju film Godzilla in 1977, which among other changes feature colorization using colored gels, footage of the bombing of Hiroshima and a synthesizer music soundtrack. The film, dubbed "Cozzilla" by fans, has been regarded as "a real oddity in the long and often bizarre history of the Godzilla franchise" and later fans stating "the Cozzi cut is now the stuff of legend, an ambitious but woefully misguided attempt to update a film that had already been compromised and really didn't need this sort of mugging".

=== 1980s to present ===
Cozzi began working at writing novels, writing thrillers including Killer Instinct and Fear Hotel and the science fiction novel Time Parallels and the horror novel Cthulu Night. He was later offered by Menahem Golan to do an updated version of the story of Hercules on the condition that he could re-write the script in three weeks. Cozzi accepted and developed Hercules, which drew inspiration from Clash of the Titans. Cozzi's film includes large amounts of stop-motion animation. Cozzi worked on a sequel that had actor Lou Ferrigno reprise his role, but found the actor only available for three weeks which led to Cozzi padding the film with footage from the first film.

Cozzi continued working with Argento, working on the special effects scenes in his film Phenomena. He created the scene involving the insects attacking a school by filming smashed coffee grounds in a water tank. He followed this work with television series Giallo working again with Argento and Lamberto Bava. Cozzi was offered to direct the film Witchery, which the initial director Claudio Lattanzi left during pre-production. Cozzi entered and left two weeks into pre-production, finding the story "too predictable and banal".

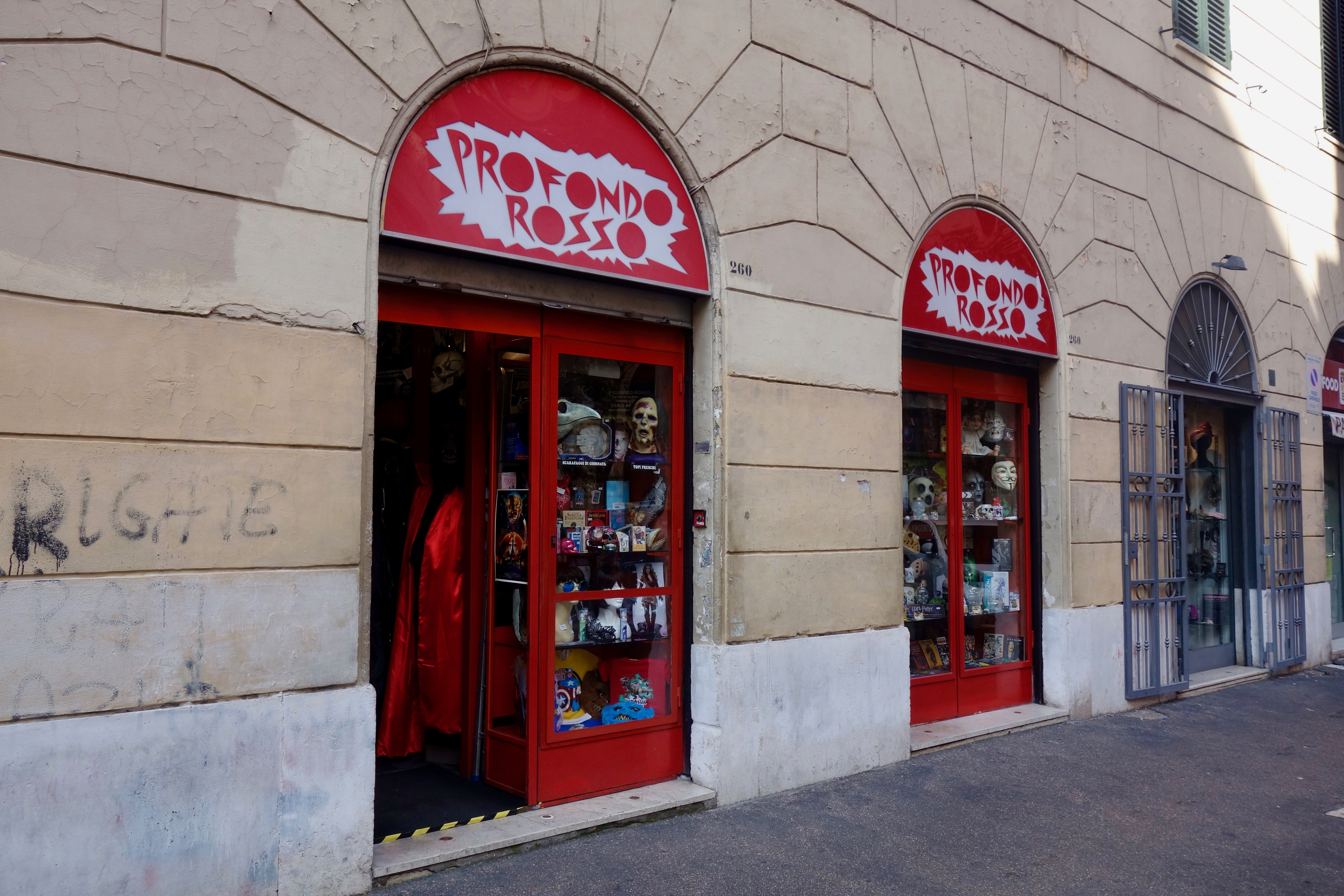
Cozzi had co-owned and managed the store "Profondo Rosso" in Italy.

Other later work included directing and writing Paganini Horror. The film stars Donald Pleasence and is based on the legend of a famous violinist being in league with the devil. Cozzi also wrote the script for Sinbad of the Seven Seas which was directed by Enzo G. Castellari, but completed by Cozzi. Among his later work is The Black Cat starring Caroline Munro, who is visited by a witch. Cozzi played himself in the film Sick-o-pathics and also developed documentaries on Dario Argento. Cozzi later made two documentaries on the films of Dario Argento, and for years co-owned and managed Argento's retail movie memorabilia store in Italy, Profondo Rosso.

A new film made by Cozzi titled Blood on Méliès' Moon was announced at the Italian Horror Fest in Nettuno in July 2014. Cozzi explained his return to film making was due to modern technology making it easier to make a film. Cozzi stated that it was similar to when he "decided to become a publisher, until then, to publish a book you had to print at least one or two thousand copies. That meant a lot of money and often your storehouses were full of unsold copies. After the advent of digital, you could print even only thirty copies of a book and so I decided to start publishing books and novels." The title of the film came from Cozzi when working for Cannon in the 1980s which had a different plot. The film had its world premiere at the Brussels International Fantastic Film Festival.

== Style ==
Most of Cozzi's films become "increasingly silly and strange" as their plot goes on.

== Filmography ==
Title	Year	Credited as				Notes	Ref(s)
Title	Year	Director	Screenwriter	Story author	Other	Notes	Ref(s)
The Tunnel Under the World	1969	Yes		Yes	Yes	Actor and film editor	
Four Flies on Grey Velvet	1971			Yes			
The Black Hand	1973		Yes				
The Five Days	1973			Yes			
The Killer Must Kill Again	1975	Yes	Yes	Yes			
La portiera nuda	1976	Yes	Yes	Yes			
Take All of Me	1976	Yes	Yes				
Starcrash	1979	Yes	Yes	Yes			
Contamination	1980	Yes	Yes	Yes			
Hercules	1983	Yes	Yes	Yes			
Monster Shark	1984			Yes			
Phenomena	1985				Yes	Special effects artist	
The Adventures of Hercules II	1985	Yes	Yes	Yes			
Vampire in Venice	1988				Yes	2nd assistant director	
Sinbad of the Seven Seas	1989	Yes		Yes			
Paganini Horror	1989	Yes	Yes				
The Black Cat (AKA De Profundis)	1990	Yes	Yes	Yes			
Two Evil Eyes	1990				Yes	Second-unit director	
The Stendhal Syndrome	1996				Yes	Second-unit director	
Dario Argento's Museum of Horrors	—N/a	Yes					
Blood on Méliès' Moon	2016	Yes					
Little Wizards of Oz	2018	Yes					

== Notes ==
=== Bibliography ===
- Curti, Roberto (2013). Italian Crime Filmography, 1968-1980. McFarland. ISBN 978-0786469765.
- Curti, Roberto (2019). Italian Gothic Horror Films, 1980-1989. McFarland. ISBN 978-1476672434.
- Cotter, Robert Michael Bobb (2012). Caroline Munro, First Lady of Fantasy: A Complete Annotated Record of Film and Television Appearances. McFarland. ISBN 978-0786468829.
- Fischer, Dennis (2011). Science Fiction Film Directors, 1895-1998. McFarland. ISBN 978-0786485055.
- Gallant, Chris (2000). Art of Darkness: The Cinema of Dario Argento. FAB Press. ISBN 1903254078.
- Howarth, Troy (2015). Splintered Visions: Lucio Fulci and his Films. Midnight Marquee Press.
- Kinnard, Roy; Crnkovich, Tony (2017). Italian Sword and Sandal Films, 1908-1990. McFarland. ISBN 978-1476662916.
