= Il bambino e il poliziotto =

1989 Italian comedy film

- Directed by: Carlo Verdone
- Written by: Leonardo Benvenuti; Piero De Bernardi; Carlo Verdone
- Produced by: Mario Cecchi Gori; Vittorio Cecchi Gori
- Starring: Carlo Verdone
- Cinematography: Danilo Desideri
- Edited by: Antonio Siciliano
- Music by: Fabio Liberatori
- Release date: December 20, 1989 (Italy)
- Running time: 118 minutes
- Country: Italy
- Language: Italian

Il bambino e il poliziotto (lit. 'The child and the policeman') is a 1989 Italian comedy film directed by Carlo Verdone.

== Plot summary ==
Police officer Carlo Vinciguerra is investigating a drug trafficking cartel. In order to infiltrate it, he pretends to be the drug-addicted nephew of an acquaintance of Rosanna Clerici, and arrests her for possession during a party at her house. However, it becomes apparent that the woman has a young child with nobody else to care for him. Carlo ends up having to host the boy until the judge decides about his mother's request for house arrest.

Carlo's professional and personal life as a bachelor is turned upside down by the need to look after the boy. In particular, his clandestine relationship with a married colleague from work is put under severe stress. Meanwhile, Rosanna hates Carlo, blaming him for unjustly entrapping her.

She accepts his tutelage of her son only out of fear of retaliation by the criminal circle with which she was still in touch. Indeed, the child ends up being kidnapped, but Carlo manages to find and free him. After this, Rosanna decides to cooperate with the police, and in return, all charges against her are dropped. Due to her child's requests, who has grown affectionate toward Carlo, she also agrees to go on a date with him.

== Cast ==
- Carlo Verdone as Carlo Vinciguerra
- Federico Rizzo as Giulio
- Adriana Franceschi as Rosanna Clerici
- Barbara Cupisti as Lucia
- Luigi Petrucci as Chief Morra
- Gianluca Favilla as Inspector Folliero
- Isabella De Bernardi as Officer D'Ambrosio
- Claudia Poggiani as Judge Caltabiano
- Tony Brennero as Chief Cipriani
- Salvatore Billa as Carmelo Privitera
- Anna Maria Dossena as Adelina Cruciada
- Francesco Gabriele as old gangster
- Pietro Genuardi as Mauro, a kidnapper
