= Barbara Cupisti =

Italian actress and director (born 1962)

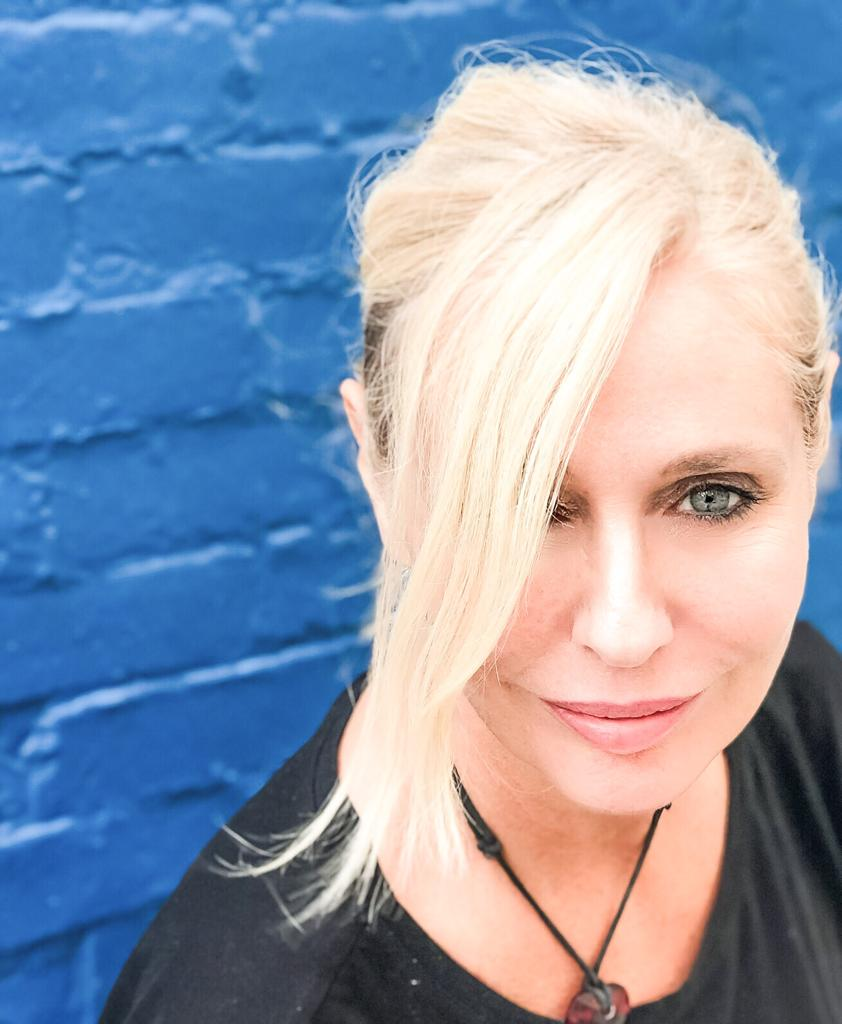
- Born: 24 January 1962 (age 64); Viareggio, Italy
- Occupations: Actress; writer; director
- Years active: 1982–present

Barbara Cupisti (born 24 January 1962) is an Italian director and actress. As a director, she focuses mainly on human rights documentaries.

== Career as actress ==
Cupisti started her career as a dancer with the Luis Falcó company. In 1981, she enrolled at the Accademia Nazionale di Arte Drammatica Silvio D'Amico, which she left two years later to make her film debut in Tinto Brass' The Key. In 1989, she was the lead actress in Carlo Verdone's Il bambino e il poliziotto. She also worked on television, notably in the series Châteauvallon, Edera and Caro maestro. Horror film fans know her from her roles in several classics such as Stage Fright (1987 film), Cemetery Man, Opera (1987 film), The New York Ripper, Hell's Gate (1989) and The Church (1989 film).

== Career as director ==
Since 2002 she started to work as director for Rai Cinema. Her first documentary film Mothers premiered at the 64th Venice International Film Festival and won the David di Donatello for Best Documentary of the year.

Her second documentary, Forbidden Childhood, was screened in the festival circuit and has received the Audience Award for the Best Documentary Film at the Bahrein International Human Rights Film Festival (May 2009) and the Amnesty International Cinema and Human Rights Award at the Pesaro International Film Festival for the New Cinema (June 2009), and at the Bobbio Film Festival of Marco Bellocchio. UNICEF Italia gave to this movie the High Patronage.

Io sono - Storie di schiavitù (I am - Stories of slavery), her third film, is about human trafficking in Italy. It was presented at the 2011 Venice Film Festival with the patronage of Amnesty International Italy and was a finalist at the Monte-Carlo Television Festival.

Fratelli e Sorelle-storie di carcere is a two-episode documentary about the dramatic situation in Italian prisons. The film has been awarded with Premio Ilaria Alpi 2012, for the best documentary of the year and got the nomination for David di Donatello 2013.

Interferenze Rom 2013 was shot in the Republic of Macedonia, Italy, and France and talks about the Gipsy community in Europe.

Cupisti made a series of three documentaries about refugees from all over the word and the reasons for their exile, titled Exiles: The wars, Exiles: Tibet, and Exiles: The Environment.

In 2016 Exiles: The wars wins the Special Nastro d'argento of the National Syndicate of Italian Film Journalists.

In 2018, Womanity is released. The film tells the story of thirty-six hours of four women in India, Egypt and the United States. It attended the Rome Film Festival and won at the Italian Film Festival in Madrid.

In 2020, My America was released and shown at the Turin Film Festival and broadcast on RAI TV.

In 2022 and 2023, she filmed "Hotel Sarajevo" and "Wartime notes", the first reflecting on the 30th anniversary since the siege of Sarajevo during the war in Bosnia, and the latter on the ongoing Russian invasion of Ukraine and the role played by Ukrainian women.

== Filmography ==
=== Actress ===
| Year | Title | Role | Notes |
|---|---|---|---|
| 1982 | The New York Ripper | Heather | Feature Film |
| 1983 | The Key | Lisa Rolfe | Feature Film |
| 1985 | Châteauvallon | Alexandra | TV series, 26 episodes |
| 1985 | International Airport | L'hostess di terra | TV series, 3 episodes |
| 1987 | Stage Fright | Alicia | Feature Film |
| 1987 | Eleven Days, Eleven Nights | Alicia | Feature Film |
| 1987 | Opera | Signora Albertini | Feature Film |
| 1988 | Piazza Navona | | TV series, 1 Episode: O Samba |
| 1989 | The Hell's Gate | Erna | Feature Film |
| 1989 | La salle de bain | Doctor's Wife | Feature Film |
| 1989 | The Church | Lisa | Feature Film |
| 1989 | Il bambino e il poliziotto | Lucia | Feature Film |
| 1989 | Dark Bar | Elisabeth | Feature Film |
| 1990 | Flight from Paradise | Assassin | Feature Film |
| 1990 | Formula I | | TV series |
| 1990 | Il volo di Teo | | Feature Film |
| 1990 | Eyewitness | Elisa | TV movie |
| 1992 | Edera | Dalma | TV series, 21 episodes |
| 1992 | Flesh and the Devil | Maria Cristina | TV movie |
| 1994 | Cemetery Man | Magda | Feature Film |
| 1994 | Only You | Anna | Feature Film |
| 1995 | L'anno prossimo... vado a letto alle dieci | Betty | Feature Film |
| 1997 | The Grey Zone | | Feature Film |
| 1997 | Commercial Break | Mary Cantucci | Feature Film |
| 1999 | Gialloparma | Cristina | Feature Film |
| 1999 | Not Registered | | Feature Film |
| 2000 | Denti | Segretaria Dott Calandra | Feature Film |
| 2001–02 | Distretto di Polizia | Irene Martini | TV series, 2 Episode: La vendetta, Doppio inganno |
| 2002 | Total Kheops | Paola | Feature Film |
| 2002 | Sotto gli occhi di tutti | Barbara | Feature Film |

=== Director ===
| Year | Title | Notes |
|---|---|---|
| 2002 | The Water Mask | Feature Film, Segment: Cornice |
| 2007 | Mothers | Documentary |
| 2008 | Forbidden Childhood | Documentary |
| 2011 | Io Sono | Documentary |
| 2012 | Storie di carcere | Documentary |
| 2013 | Interferenze Rom | Documentary |
| 2014 | Exiles. The Wars | Documentary |
| 2015 | Exiles. Tibet | Documentary |
| 2016 | Exiles. The environment | Documentary |
| 2018 | Womanity | Documentary |
| 2020 | My America | Documentary |
| 2022 | Hotel Sarajevo | Documentary |
| 2023 | Wartime Notes | Documentary |
