= Elena Sofia Ricci =

Italian actress (born 1962)

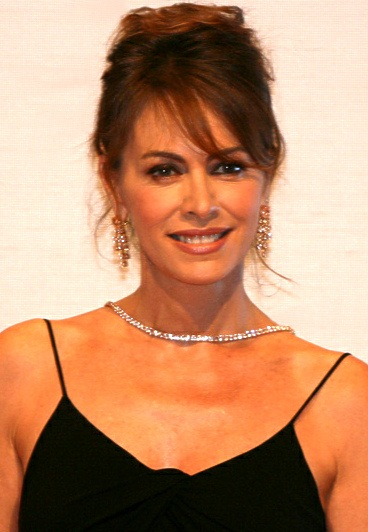
- Elena Sofia Ricci at Roma Fiction Fest 2009
- Born: Elena Sofia Barucchieri; 29 March 1962 (age 64); Florence, Tuscany, Italy
- Occupation: Actress
- Years active: 1980–present
- Height: 1.67 m (5 ft 6 in)
- Spouses: Luca Damiani (divorced) Stefano Mainetti (m. 2003)
- Children: 2

Elena Sofia Barucchieri (born 29 March 1962), known by the stage name Elena Sofia Ricci (pronounced [ˈɛːlena soˈfiːa ˈrittʃi]), is an Italian actress.

Active in film, theater and television, the actress has won major awards in their respective fields in Italy, including three David di Donatello, four Nastro d'Argento, a Globo d'oro and three Premi Flaiano. Throughout her career Ricci has worked under the direction of Paolo Sorrentino, Ferzan Özpetek, Giovanni Veronesi, Luciano Odorisio and worked in leading roles in the Italian television series Orgoglio, I Cesaroni and Che Dio ci aiuti.

== Biography and career ==
Elena Sofia Barucchieri was born in Florence to Paolo Barucchieri, an educator, and Elena Ricci Poccetto, a production designer. She has a younger sister called Elisa (born 1967), who worked as an artistic director and dancer. After a few minor roles, Ricci emerged in 1984, with the Pupi Avati's film Impiegati, for which she won a Globo d'oro for Best New Actress.

In 1988 she won a David di Donatello for Best Supporting Actress and a Silver Ribbon in the same category for her role in Carlo Verdone's Io e mia sorella.

In 1990 Ricci was awarded with a David di Donatello for Best Actress and a Ciak D'Oro in the same category for her performance in Ne parliamo Lunedì.

In 2010 she shared with Lunetta Savino a Silver Ribbon for Best supporting Actress for Mine vaganti, directed by Ferzan Özpetek.

Elena Sofia Ricci is very active as a television actress, starring in many popular TV series. For her television activity she received several awards, including two Telegatti, the 2005 Fiore di Roccia, and the 2006 Premio Afrodite as Best TV-Actress.

In 2018, she won the Silver Ribbon for Best Actress for her role of Veronica Lario in Paolo Sorrentino's Loro, for which she won the David di Donatello for Best Actress the following year.

== Personal life ==
Ricci has been married twice. Her first husband was Luca Damiani. She was then in a relationship with Pino Quartullo, with whom she had a daughter. She is currently married to musician Stefano Mainetti, and gave birth to her second daughter, Maria, in 2004.

Formerly an agnostic, she now identifies as Roman Catholic.

== Filmography ==
Films
Year	Title	Role	Notes
1980	Arrivano i gatti	Young woman	Cameo appearance
1982	Canto d'amore	Elena Uber	Feature film debut
1983	Zero in condotta	Manuela Spizzi	
1985	Bank Clerks	Annalisa	
1985	Una domenica si	Elena	
1987	The Last Minute	Marta Ferroni	
1987	Io e mia sorella	Serena	
1988	Sposi	Silvia	Anthology film
1989	Burro	Katarina	
1990	Ne parliamo Lunedì	Alma	
1990	In the Name of the Sovereign People	Cristina Arquati	
1991	Ma non per sempre	Selva	
1992	Non chiamarmi Omar	Hanna Lafevre	
1993	Stefano Quantestorie	Angela	
1994	Love Burns	Elena	
1996	Esercizi di stile	Various	Anthology film
1997	Donna di piacere	Rannusia	
2001	Commedia sexy	Anna	
2001	Come si fa un Martini	Viola	
2003	Il pranzo della domenica	Sofia Lo Iacono	
2003	At the End of the Night	Elena	
2009	Many Kisses Later	Michela	
2010	Loose Cannons	Aunt Luciana	
2010	Parents and Children: Shake Well Before Using	Clara	
2011	Tutta colpa della musica	Patrizia	
2014	Fasten Your Seatbelts	Viviana/ Dora	
2015	I Killed Napoléon	Olga	
2018	Il tuttofare	Titti Mandorlini	
2018	Loro	Veronica Lario	
2021	Superheroes	Elena	
2024	Diamonds	Herself	
2025	Another Simple Favor	Portia Versano	

Television
Year	Title	Role	Notes
1984–1985	Quei trentasei gradini	Carla	Miniseries; 6 episodes
1987	Little Roma	Claudia	Main role; 10 episodes
1992	Il segno del comando	Barbara Logan	Television film
1996–1997	Caro maestro	Elisa Terenzi	Main role; 13 episodes
1998	La forza dell'amore	Silvia	Miniseries; 3 episodes
1999	Jesus	Herodias	Television film
1999	Mio figlio ha 70 anni	Angela	Television film
2000	Il rumore dei ricordi	Linda	Television film
2001	Scherzi a parte	Herself	Italian variety show
2003	Un papà quasi perfetto	Elena Melli	Miniseries; 3 episodes
2004–2006	Orgoglio	Anna Obrofari	Lead role; 39 episodes
2006	Fratelli	Anna	Television film
2006	Giovanni Falcone: L'uomo che sfidò Cosa Nostra	Francesca Morvillo	Miniseries; 2 episodes
2006–2014	I Cesaroni	Lucia Liguori	Lead role; 115 episodes
2007	Tutti i rumori del mondo	Elena Casati	Television film
2008	Caravaggio	Costanza Colonna	Miniseries; 2 episodes
2008	Amiche mie	Francesca	Recurring role; 6 episodes
2010	Gli ultimi del Paradiso	Carmen	Television film
2010	Agata e Ulisse	Agata	Television film
2011; 2020	Don Matteo	Sister Angela	Episodes: "Don Matteo sotto accusa"; "Non rubare"
2011–2023	Che Dio ci aiuti	Sister Angela	Lead role (seasons 1–6), recurring (season 7); 119 episodes
2014	Le due leggi	Adriana Zanardi	Miniseries; 2 episodes
2020	Vivi e lascia vivere	Laura Ruggero	Lead role; 12 episodes
2020	Rita Levi-Montalcini	Rita Levi-Montalcini	Television film
2022	The Ignorant Angels	Countess Mirtilla	Episode: "Episode 7"
2023–present	Fiori sopra l'inferno – I casi di Teresa Battaglia	Teresa Battaglia	Lead role

== Theatography ==
Year	Title	Role	Notes
1981	La scuola delle mogli,	Agnese	Supporting role; Direction by Marco Mattolini
1985	Il bugiardo	The young lady	Supporting role; Direction by Alvaro Piccardi
1994	Macbeth	Lady Macbeth	Lead role; Direction by Giancarlo Sepe
1997	Estate e fumo		Directed by Armando Pugliese
1999	Come tu mi vuoi	Elma/Lucia	Main role; Directed by Armando Pugliese
2003	Il rumore dei ricordi	Linda	Lead role; Direction by Giuseppe Patroni Griffi
2015	I Blues	Three women	Lead roles; Direction by Armando Pugliese
2017	Mammamiabella!	Direction	
2018–2020	Vetri rotti	Sylvia Gellburg	Lead role; Direction by Armando Pugliese
2021–2023	La dolce ala della giovinezza	Alexandra del Lago	Lead role; Direction by Pier Luigi Pizzi
2022–2023	Fedra	Fedra	Lead role; Also director

== Awards and nominations ==
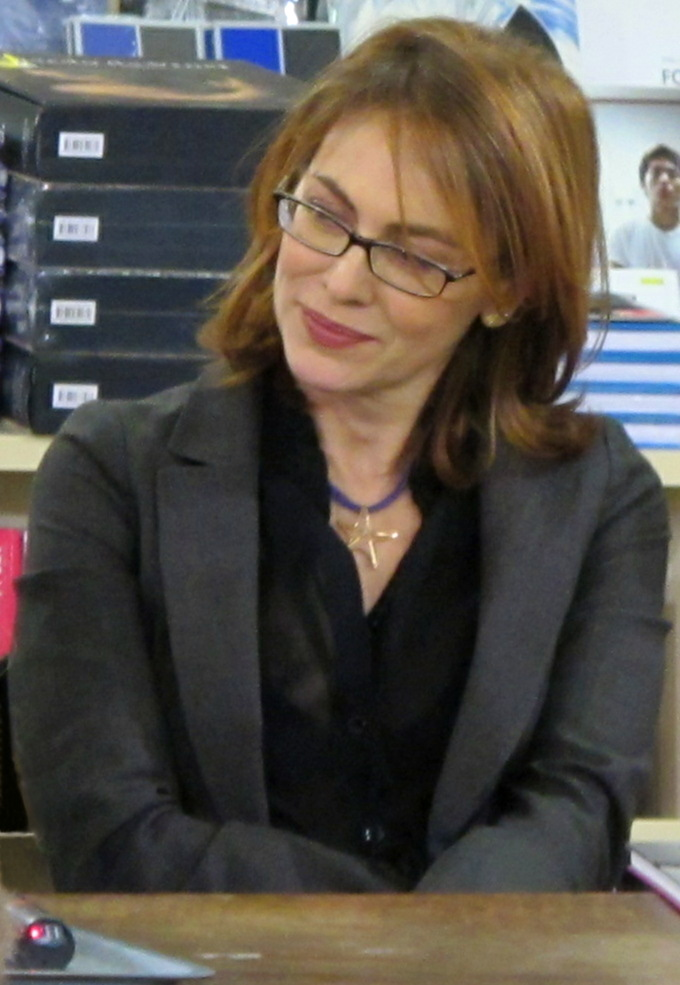
Elena Sofia Ricci

Award	Year	Category	Nominated work	Result	Ref.
Ciak d'oro	1988	Best Supporting Actress	Io e mia sorella	Won	
Ciak d'oro	1990	Best Supporting Actress	Burro	Nominated	
Ciak d'oro	1990	Best Actress	Ne parliamo Lunedì	Won	
Ciak d'oro	2010	Best Actress	Genitori & figli - Agitare bene prima dell'uso	Nominated	
Ciak d'oro	2010	Best Supporting Actress	Loose Cannons	Won	
Ciak d'oro	2016	CinéCiak d’Oro Classic	Herself	Won	
David di Donatello	1988	Best Supporting Actress	Io e mia sorella	Won	
David di Donatello	1990	Best Actress	Ne parliamo Lunedì	Won	
David di Donatello	2010	Best Supporting Actress	Loose Cannons	Nominated	
David di Donatello	2019	Best Actress	Loro	Won	
Giffoni Film Festival	2019	Experience Award	Herself	Won	
Globo d'oro	1985	Best breakthrough actress	Impiegati	Won	
Globo d'oro	1996	Best Actress	Esercizi di stile	Nominated	
Nastro d'Argento	1988	Best Supporting Actress	Io e mia sorella	Won	
Nastro d'Argento	1991	Best Actress	Ne parliamo lunedì	Nominated	
Nastro d'Argento	2010	Nastro d'Argento for Best Supporting Actress	Loose Cannons	Won	
Nastro d'Argento	2018	Best Actress	Loro	Won	
Nastro d'Argento	2022	Jury Special Mention - Documentary	Grido per un nuovo Rinascimento	Won	
Nastro d'Argento	2023	Nastro d'argento Speciale	Herself	Won	
Premio Flaiano	1989	Best Female Acting Performance – Cinema	I giovani del cinema italiano	Won	
Premio Flaiano	2000	Best Female Acting Performance – Television	Il rumore dei ricordi	Won	
Premio Flaiano	2018	Best Female Acting Performance – Theatre	Vetri rotti	Won	
Roma Fiction Festival	2013	Best Female Actress in a Television Series – Comedy	Che Dio ci aiuti	Won	
Roma Fiction Festival	2013	Best Character Performance	Che Dio ci aiuti	Won	
Venice Film Festival	2010	Kinéo Award for Best Supporting Actress	Genitori & figli - Agitare bene prima dell'uso	Nominated	
Venice Film Festival	2010	Kinéo Award for Best Supporting Actress	Mine vaganti	Nominated	
Venice Film Festival	2014	Kinéo Award for Best Supporting Actress	Allacciate le cinture	Won	
