= Contamination (film) =

1980 film by Luigi Cozzi

- Italian theatrical release poster for Contamination
- Directed by: Luigi Cozzi
- Screenplay by: Luigi Cozzi
- Produced by: Claudio Mancini
- Starring: Ian McCulloch; Louise Marleau; Marino Masè; Siegfried Rauch; Gisela Hahn
- Cinematography: Giuseppe Pinori
- Edited by: Nino Baragli
- Music by: Goblin
- Production companies: Alex Cinematographica S.r.l.; Barthonia-Film; Lisa Film
- Distributed by: P.A.C. (Italy); Residenz Film (West Germany)
- Release dates: 2 August 1980 (Italy); 5 September 1980 (West Germany)
- Running time: 82 minutes
- Countries: Italy; West Germany
- Budget: $225,000

Contamination (also released as Alien Contamination, Toxic Spawn or Larvae) is a 1980 science-fiction horror film written and directed by Luigi Cozzi, and starring Ian McCulloch, Louise Marleau, and Marino Masé. The film is about an alien cyclops creature that uses human agents to place eggs all over Earth. The eggs release a gelatinous goo that causes people to explode when they come into physical contact with the substance.

An Italian and West German co-production, the film premiered on 2 August 1980. It received mixed reviews from critics, though the film score by Goblin was praised.

== Plot ==
A large, seemingly abandoned ship drifts into New York Harbor. The ship is discovered to be carrying large containers of coffee, hidden inside are a series of football-sized green eggs. The crew sent in to explore the ghost ship finds the mutilated remains of the crew gathered in one place, and they soon discover the reason why: when disturbed, the green eggs explode, spraying a viscous liquid over everything. The liquid is toxic to living creatures and causes the body to explode immediately.

The military's answer to this phenomenon is Colonel Stella Holmes. She establishes a link between the green eggs and a recent mission to Mars that ended badly for the two astronauts who descended. One of them disappeared, and the other, Commander Hubbard, had a breakdown and subsequently became an alcoholic. When pressed, Hubbard agrees to help Holmes investigate the insidious plot to bring the deadly eggs to Manhattan, and it takes them, along with sarcastic New York cop Tony Aris, to a Colombian coffee plantation.

All is not as it seems; Hubbard's former astronaut colleague is alive and well and living under the influence of a monstrous alien Cyclops, which is using mind control to further its plot to flood the world with green eggs and wipe out human life on Earth. Aris falls under the alien's mental influence and is devoured, but Hubbard saves Stella and kills the Cyclops by shooting out its eye. Hamilton, only a puppet of the evil alien mind, dies without the alien's power to sustain him. Government agents proceed to confiscate the remaining alien pods. However, a surviving, previously unseen pod explodes on a busy street corner.

== Cast ==
- Ian McCulloch as Commander Ian Hubbard
- Louise Marleau as Colonel Stella Holmes
- Marino Masè as NYPD Lieutenant Tony Aris
- Siegfried Rauch as Hamilton
- Gisela Hahn as Perla de la Cruz
- Carlo De Mejo as Agent Young
- Carlo Monni as Dr. Turner
- Horst Weinert as Dr. Hilton
- Brigitte Wagner as Doctor

== Production ==
After the success of his film Starcrash, director Luigi Cozzi wanted to follow it up with another science fiction film. On seeing Ridley Scott's film Alien his producer decided he wanted Cozzi to make something similar. Cozzi later remarked, "Without the existence of Alien, we could not have made this movie at all."

Due to budgetary constraints Cozzi decided to set the film on Earth, although retaining the ideas of the alien eggs and a large creature from Scott's film, and wrote a script called Alien Arrives on Earth. Producer Claudio Mancini wanted to use the name Contamination, which had been the working title for an aborted film he had been developing based on the Jane Fonda film The China Syndrome. The name was changed against Cozzi's wishes, with the producer also insisting that Cozzi develop more James Bond-style elements rather than his science fiction theme.

The film's production offices were in the same building as those used by the makers of Zombi 2 and, impressed by the profits that film had made, Cozzi decided to try to hire the same cast members, although ultimately Ian McCulloch was the only actor to work on Contamination. Cozzi wanted to use Caroline Munro (who had been featured in Starcrash) as Colonel Holmes but once again the producer overruled him and hired Canadian actress Louise Marleau instead.

Contamination was shot in eight weeks between 14 January and 4 March 1980. The film schedule included three weeks in Rome and then a further two weeks split between location shooting in New York City, Florida and Colombia. Cozzi had wanted to use animation or stop motion photography to realise the alien cyclops at the film's climax but was once again overruled by the producer, and an animatronic version was constructed instead. Cozzi subsequently claimed that this creature failed to work properly and would barely move, so he had to use rapid jump cuts to hide the fact that it was being pulled about by stagehands.

== Release ==
Contamination premiered in Bologna on 2 August 1980. It was distributed in Italy by P.A.C.. It was released in West Germany on 5 September, where it was distributed by Residenz-Film.

=== Home media ===
The BBFC classified the uncut version with a 15 certificate. It was released on home video in the United States under the titles Alien Contamination and Toxic Spawn, which are both heavily edited. Cozzi later revealed that Cannon Films, the film's North American distributor, had changed the name to Alien Contamination in order to capitalize on the popularity of Ridley Scott's Alien (1979). It is now available in the US in an unedited version which has been released on DVD.

Arrow Video released the film uncut on Blu-Ray in 2015. The uncut version runs 95 minutes.

== Critical reception ==
Contamination received mixed reviews. On the review aggregator website Rotten Tomatoes, 50% of 4 critics’ reviews are positive.

In a contemporary review, Variety referred to the film as a "routine tale" that was a poorly written horror film that did not hide its Italian origins with "silly English dialog" and "poor dubbing" being its giveaways.

From retrospective reviews, Kim Newman (Monthly Film Bulletin) stated that the films combination of "splattery violence", "James Bond spy thriller", and "monster-filled s-f" was "at times uneasy, but Cozzi carries it off with sufficient bravura to paper over the cracks" and that "If the film relies on familiar images...it at least has a class, very loud score by Dario Argento's usual collaborators, The Goblins, to punch up the frissons." Mike Long (DVD Talk) stated that while Contamination "makes good use of the ideas that it's stolen, at heart it is simply another boring Euro-horror film."
