= The Tunnel under the World =

1955 science fiction short story by Frederik Pohl

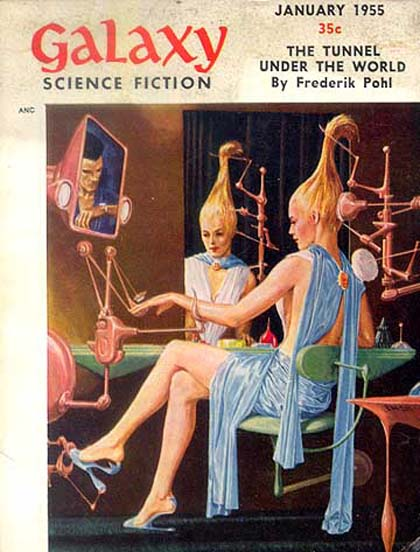
January 1955 issue of Galaxy Science Fiction in which the story was first published

"The Tunnel under the World" is a science fiction short story by American writer Frederik Pohl (1919-2013), first published in 1955 in Galaxy magazine. It has frequently been anthologized, for example in The Penguin Science Fiction Omnibus (1973) edited by Brian Aldiss, and The Golden Age of Science Fiction anthology edited by Kingsley Amis (1981).

The story is a dystopian and vitriolic attack on the advertising industry, the computer revolution, and the American political system.

== Plot ==
On the morning of June 15, Guy Burckhardt wakes from a terrible nightmare in which he is suddenly and violently killed in an explosion. Although the town of Tylerton looks quite normal, Burckhardt is unsettled on his way to work by all-pervasive advertising jingles for unfamiliar brands. At the offices of Contro Chemicals, Burckhardt's boss is absent, and the receptionist suggests he may have gone to the plant. Burckhardt hates the factory with its robot-staffed machines, every robot reproducing the actual memory and mind of a real human being. He decides to handle the tax returns due that day himself. On his way home, a colleague named Swanson tries to speak to him but does not get the desired reaction.

The next morning, Burckhardt awakes from the same nightmare. It is June 15 again and he has forgotten the previous day. Outside his window a truck is broadcasting freezer advertisements at ear-splitting volume. At lunch, he is approached in his regular restaurant by a young woman, April Horn, who apologizes for the disturbance and, as compensation, offers him a discount on a new freezer.

That evening the house lights blow, and Burckhardt goes down to the cellar to change the fuse. He discovers that parts of the cellar have been inexplicably dismantled and crudely rebuilt. While investigating, he abruptly falls asleep, and spends the entire night on the cellar floor. When he awakens, it is June 15 again – but this time he remembers the previous day. Swanson again speaks to Burckhardt, and Burckhardt asks why he keeps approaching him. Swanson hustles him out, first to the lunch restaurant and then quickly away when Burckhardt recognises and greets April Horn, now attempting to interest customers in a tray of candies.

Stepping through a door at a movie theater, Swanson leads Burckhardt through a long metal-walled tunnel. Swanson explains that a couple of months earlier, although he does not now remember, Burckhardt had banged on his door late at night with a crazy story, begging to be hidden. The pair had hidden for some time in Swanson's darkroom, waking each morning with a memory of previous days. Then, one night, Burckhardt was late getting to the darkroom, slept outside, and lost his memories. Swanson says that for most of Tylerton's residents, every day is June 15 and is almost the same – apart from the actions of a small group of people, including April Horn, whose job appears to be to expose them to a never-ending variety of advertisements.

The tunnel leads to the empty halls of the Contro Chemicals plant. They find a gun, and wait in a nearby office. The door opens, and a man enters, followed by April Horn. The man, Mr. Dorchin, who seems to be in charge, denies kidnapping the residents of Tylerton. Pushed beyond endurance, Burckhardt fires, hitting April Horn in the abdomen. There is no blood, and through the wound Burckhardt can see wires. She is a robot. She twitches, and says to Burckhardt "And so are you."

She explains that following a massive explosion at the plant on June 14 that killed all the residents of Tylerton, the advertising executive Mr. Dorchin took the opportunity to re-create the town, transferring memories from the dead residents to a new population of robots which are being used as captive subjects for testing high pressure advertising campaigns. Each night, Dorchin's employees reset the robots' memories in preparation for the next experiment.

Dorchin calmly suggests that they let his maintenance crews 'adjust' them, so they can forget all this, but Burckhardt angrily refuses, saying that if he has to, he will shoot his way out. Dorchin's robot body steps aside, letting Burckhardt out into the corridor. He hurries along, still hoping to make his escape and report Dorchin's illegal actions to the FBI. Opening a door, he finds himself standing on a metal ledge at the edge of a vast chasm. Looming giant-like above him is the flesh-and-blood Dorchin who has created the entire town on a tabletop. Dorchin reaches down to pick up the miniature Burckhardt and sends him off for maintenance.

Burckhardt wakes on the morning of June 15 from a monstrous and incomprehensible dream. In the street outside, a sound-truck blares out election propaganda.

== Interpretation ==
In his 2010 discussion of virtual realities in science fiction, Svante Lovén argued that the story is a strongly dystopian and vitriolic attack on the advertising industry that goes beyond its primary target to speculate on the possible consequences of the computer revolution. He suggested that in combining these separate institutional spheres into a single conspiracy, Pohl highlights their common indifference to humanist values. At the end of the story, the conspiracy is extended to include the political system, with the experimental subjects becoming a testing ground for an electoral campaign. Ultimately, Burckhardt is re-programmed to erase his memories – "There is no escaping the system of lies."

== Dramatic adaptations ==
The story has been adapted for other media several times, including:

- Two radio adaptations of "Tunnel Under the World" were broadcast as episodes of X Minus One.
- It was produced for television by the BBC in 1966 in series 2 of the anthology series Out of the Unknown. It is one of only four episodes from the thirteen-episode season to survive.
- The story was the basis for the Italian surrealist film The Tunnel Under the World (Il tunnel sotto il mondo) (1969).
- The story inspired the French student short film, "Le 15 Mai" (1969), the directorial debut of Claire Denis.
- A German radio adaptation titled Tylerton was produced by public radio station Süddeutscher Rundfunk. It first aired in 1986 and was resurfaced by the Das war morgen podcast in 2023.
- An American TV movie, Virtual Nightmare (2000) was loosely based on the story.
