= Candice Daly =

American actress

- Candice Daly in 1998
- Born: Candice Mia Daly; January 4, 1966; Los Angeles, California, U.S.
- Died: December 14, 2004 (aged 38); Los Angeles, California, U.S.
- Occupation: Actress
- Years active: 1984–1998
- Spouse: Bertrand Triguer (May 14, 1998 – December 14, 2004; her death)

Candice Mia Daly (January 4, 1966 – December 14, 2004) was an American film and television actress. In the late 1980s and early 1990s she starred in a number of B-movies and cult films such as After Death (1988) and Liquid Dreams (1991). She was at one time engaged to one of her co-stars Brent Huff. Perhaps the role which garnered her the widest audience was psychotic Veronica Landers on American soap opera The Young and the Restless from 1997 to 1998.

Work was scarce for Daly after she left The Young and the Restless, and she was found dead in a rundown Los Angeles apartment on December 14, 2004. The cause of death was listed as polydrug intoxication complicated by severe steatohepatitis; although her boyfriend stated that he believes that she was a victim of foul play.

== Filmography ==
Film
Year	Film	Role	Notes
1985	Girls Just Want to Have Fun	Girl in Hallway	
1986	Hell Hunters	Ally	Alternative title: Rage to Kill
1988	After Death	Jenny	Alternative title: Zombie 4: After Death
1988	Cop Game	Annie	
1991	Liquid Dreams	Eve Black	
1995	Steal Big Steal Little	Melissa	
1996	Where Truth Lies	Wendy/Teresa Lazarre	
Television
Year	Title	Role	Notes
1984	Cover Up		Television movie
1984	Hotel	Woman	1 episode
1993	Heart of Darkness		Uncredited; Television movie
1997–1998	The Young and the Restless	Veronica Landers	Unknown episodes
1998	Winnetous Rückkehr	Mary	Television movie
