= Al Festa =

Italian film director (1957–2026)

- Born: 8 November 1957; Rome, Italy
- Died: 12 March 2026 (aged 68); Viterbo, Italy
- Occupations: Film director, screenwriter, composer

Al Festa (8 November 1957 – 12 March 2026) was an Italian film director, screenwriter and composer. He died in Viterbo on 12 March 2026, at the age of 68.
