= Luis Perezagua =

Spanish film, theater, and television actor

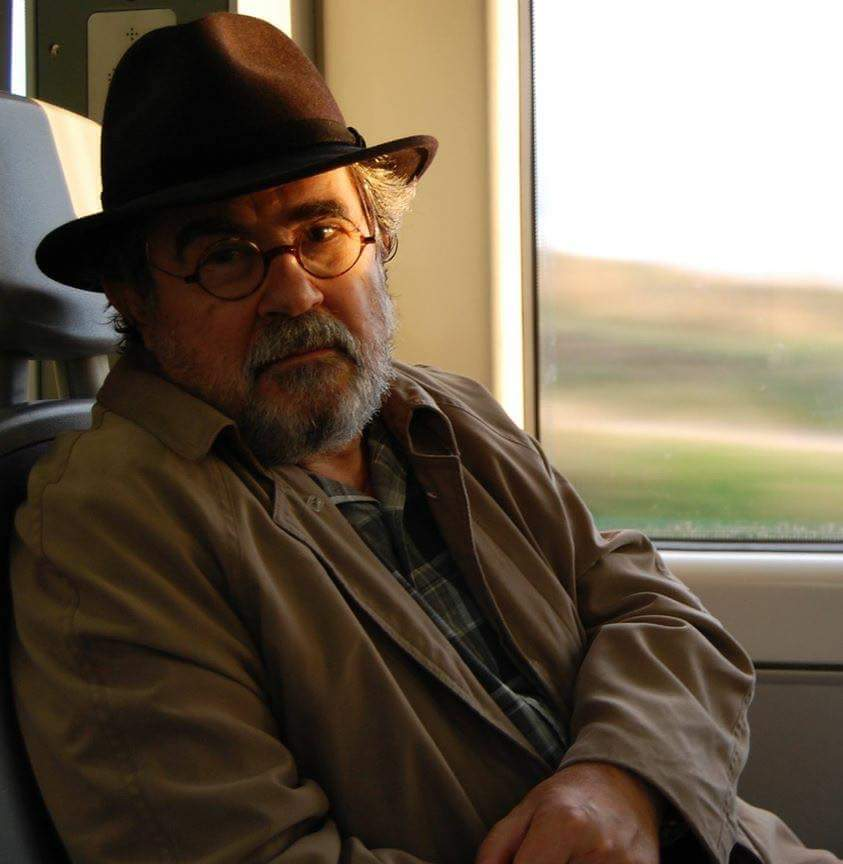
- Luis Perezagua
- Born: Luis Perezagua Mayans; 8 October 1949 (age 76); Madrid, Spain
- Occupation: Actor
- Years active: 1979–present

Luis Perezagua (born 8 October 1949) is a Spanish actor of theater, cinema and television.

== Biography ==
Perezagua studied theater at The Royal High School of Dramatic Arts in Madrid. He began his professional career in Antonio Buero Vallejo's play "La Detonación" directed by José Tamayo. At that time he had previously participated in independent theater groups with plays by playwrights such as Max Aub and Fernando Arrabal. From then on, his professional career was mainly linked to the world of theater (The Zarzuela and Spanish Variety Shows). At that time he alternated his professional activities with work in the cinema and television, and most recently, as an actor and speaker at the Complutense University of Madrid.

He has been a member of the CNINAT (National Center for the Initiation of Children and Adolescents to the Theater), directed by José María Morera, intervening in several of its productions.

=== Theater ===
Throughout his career as an actor, he has been part of several theater and zarzuela companies, such as The Spanish Company of Classical Theater (directed by Manuel Canseco), The Small Theater Company of Madrid (directed by Antonio Guirau), The National Lyrical Company, The Ases Líricos Company (directed by Evelio Esteve) and the Isaac Albéniz Company (directed by Angel F. Montesinos). While in these companies, he performed mainly in popular plays from the Spanish Golden Age, even receiving the prize for Best Actor in the "Theater Festival of The Spanish Golden Age", celebrated in the Chamizal National Memorial (United States) with the play "La dama duende", in 1986. He performed as a comic tenor with the Ases Líricos Company and Isaac Albéniz Company in many well-known zarzuelas including, La del manojo de rosas, La calesera, Doña Francisquita, La corte de faraón, La verbena de la paloma, etc., as well as in their variety shows, Las leandras, La blanca doble and La bruja (As Tomillo). This last play was represented in honor of the one-hundredth year after the death of Gayarre, and was directed by Ignacio Aranaz.

In 1993 he starred with Lina Morgan in Celeste no es un color, and was directed by prestigious directors such as Josep María Mestre, Carles Alfaro, Francisco Nieva, Víctor Andrés Catena, José Luis García Sánchez, José Osuna, Evelio Esteve, Ángel F. Montesinos, Ignacio Aranaz, Gerardo Malla, Andrés Lima, José Tamayo, Alberto González Vergel, Carlos Larrañaga, Juan José Alonso Millán, Antonio Guirau, Mara Recatero, Luis Balaguer, Luis Iturri, Emilio Sagi, José Luis Alonso, Manuel Canseco, Ramón Ballesteros, Juan Carlos Pérez de la Fuente and Lluís Pascual, among others. He has performed in many different play genres throughout his career.

=== Cinema ===
He debuted with the short film Eres mi gula (starring with Isabel Ordaz), and later, he performed supporting roles in several films. His most prominent role in his early years as supporting actor was in the film Dawn Breaks, Which Is No Small Thing, directed by José Luis Cuerda in 1988. Later, he played as a supporting actor in several films directed by Fernando Fernán Gómez, such as Out of play in 1991, The woman of your life in 1994 and Nightmare for a rich man, in 1996.

In 1995 he performed as a supporting actor in two films nominated for the Goya Awards, Nobody Will Speak of Us When We're Dead and Así en el cielo como en la tierra. He has also performed in Love Can Seriously Damage Your Health, and since the year 2000, he worked under the command of José Luis García Sánchez in films such as Adiós con el corazón, The Green March and Franky Banderas.

His most recent work is in the new film by José Luis Cuerda, Tiempo después, which was released at the end of 2018.

=== Television ===
His first work in television was in 1980, in children's shows such as La cometa blanca and music programs such as Auanbabulubabalambambú (1985).

Between 1984 and 1988, he was the voice of Maese Camera in La bola de cristal. Later, he intervened in series such as Barrio Sésamo, Detrás de la puerta, and Los mundos de Yupi, where he was an important character. From the end of the 1980s until now, he has performed in numerous supporting roles in several television series such as Brigada Central, Hostal Royal Manzanares, ¡Ay, Señor, Señor!, Los ladrones van a la oficina, Cuéntame cómo pasó, Velvet Colección, and many more. He starred in the series Turno de oficio: 10 años después (where he played Borja); Compuesta y sin novio (as Martinez); Los negocios de mamá (as Estanislao), Señor alcalde (as Benito), and recently, in the first three seasons of Amar en tiempos revueltos, where he played the character which would make him quite famous, Isidro Bulnes.

He has performed as a supporting character in mini-series such as La Regenta (Fernando Méndez-Leite), El Quijote de Miguel de Cervantes (Manuel Gutiérrez Aragón), Entre naranjos (Josefina Molina), La banda de Pérez (Ricardo Palacios), and Martes de Carnaval (José Luis García Sánchez), among others.

== Theater ==
Year	Play	Playwright	Directed by
2019	El sueño de la vida	Federico García Lorca and Alberto Conejero	Lluís Pascual
2017	La visita	Carmen Resino	Ramón Ballesteros
2017	¡Viva la bagatela!	Ramón Ballesteros and Silvio Martínez, from Ramón María del Valle-Inclán's texts	Ramón Ballesteros
2014	Fermín Pocacosa	Ramón Ballesteros	Ramón Ballesteros
2014	La Venganza de Don Mendo	Pedro Muñoz Seca	Jesús Castejón
2012	Orquesta de señoritas	Jean Anouilh	Juan Carlos Pérez de la Fuente
2009	Angelina o el honor de un brigadier	Enrique Jardiel Poncela	Juan Carlos Pérez de la Fuente
2008	Puerta del Sol. Un episodio nacional	Benito Pérez Galdós	Juan Carlos Pérez de la Fuente
2006	La venganza de la Petra (As Nicomedes)	Carlos Arniches	José Luis Moreno
2005	Melocotón en almíbar	Miguel Mihura	Mara Recatero
2003	El acero de Madrid	Lope de Vega	Joaquín Vida
2003	Anacleto se divorcia	Pedro Muñoz Seca	Fernando Navarrete
2003	Dama de moda	Juan José Alonso Millán	Juan José Alonso Millán
2002	Usted puede ser un asesino (As The Inspector)	Alfonso Paso	Ramón Ballesteros
2002	La canasta	Miguel Mihura	Ramón Ballesteros
2001	Sin rencor	Sam Bobrick	Carlos Larrañaga
1999	Sé infiel y no mires con quién	John Chapman and Ray Cooney	Ramón Ballesteros
1999	¡Ay caray!	Josep Maria Benet i Jornet	Manuel Ángel Egea
1998	Las últimas lunas	Furio Bordon	José Luis García Sánchez
1996	Los Pelópidas	Jorge Llopis	Ramón Ballesteros
1995	La discreta enamorada	Lope de Vega	Antonio Guirau
1995	La dama boba	Lope de Vega	Antonio Guirau
1994	Usted puede ser un asesino (As Julio)	Alfonso Paso	Antonio Guirau
1993	Celeste no es un color	Roberto Romero	Víctor Andrés Catena
1993	El cianuro... ¿solo o con leche?	Juan José Alonso Millán	Antonio Guirau
1991	Arniches 92	Juan José Arteche and Ángel F. Montesinos, from Carlos Arniches's sainetes	Ángel F. Montesinos
1991	La venganza de la Petra (As Conesa)	Carlos Arniches	Víctor Andrés Catena
1989	Transbordo	José Luis Miranda	Pedro Miguel Martínez
1989	La enamorada del rey	Ramón María del Valle-Inclán	José Luis Alonso
1987	Por la calle de Alcalá 2	Juan José Arteche	Ángel F. Montesinos
1987	Bailar con la más fea	Ray Cooney	Víctor Andrés Catena
1986	Dobles parejas	David Wiltse	Gerardo Malla
1985	Dos igual a uno	Ray Cooney	Ángel F. Montesinos
1983	Don Álvaro o la fuerza del sino	Duque de Rivas	Francisco Nieva
1983	El carnaval de un reino	José Martín Recuerda	Alberto González Vergel
1982	El caballero de Olmedo	Lope de Vega	José Osuna
1982	Julieta tiene un desliz	Julio Mathias	Ángel García Moreno
1981	La gaviota	Antón Chéjov	Manuel Collado
1979	La señorita de Trevélez	Carlos Arniches	José Osuna
1979	Burlas del secreto amor. Comedias de Himenea y Calamita	Juan Antonio Castro, from Bartolomé Torres Naharro's texts	Manuel Canseco
1979	El perro del hortelano	Lope de Vega	Manuel Canseco
1979	Casa con dos puertas, mala es de guardar	Pedro Calderón de la Barca	Manuel Canseco
1978	El alquimista y la nieve	Childish story, music by Guillermo Rodríguez	Domingo Serrano
1977	La detonación	Antonio Buero Vallejo	José Tamayo

=== Small Theater Company of Madrid ===
Year	Play	Playwright	Directed by
1995	Romeo and Juliet	William Shakespeare	Antonio Guirau
1995	The Taming of the Shrew	William Shakespeare	Antonio Guirau
1986	La dama duende	Pedro Calderón de la Barca	Antonio Guirau
1984	El lindo don Diego	Agustín Motero	Antonio Guirau
1984	El caballero de Olmedo	Lope de Vega	Antonio Guirau

=== Dramatized readings ===
Year	Play	Playwright	Directed by
2018	El ala quebradiza de la mariposa	Santiago Sanguinetti	Natalia Menéndez
2017	Puccini en concierto	Giacomo Puccini	Ramón Torrelledó
2017	Gloria Fuertes en su centenario: la poeta de los poetas	Gloria Fuertes's poems	Marcos Roca Sierra

== Zarzuela ==
=== The National Lyrical Company ===
Year	Play	Playwright	Music Composer	Directed by
2009	La calesera	Emilio González del Castillo and Luis Martínez Román	Francisco Alonso	Carles Alfaro
2008	De Madrid a París	Eusebio Sierra and José Jackson	Federico Chueca	Andrés Lima
2008	El bateo	Antonio Domínguez and Antonio Paso	Federico Chueca	Andrés Lima
2007	El barbero de Sevilla	Guillermo Perrín y Vico and Miguel de Palacios	Gerónimo Giménez and Manuel Nieto	Josep María Mestres
1995	La montería	José Ramos Martín	Jacinto Guerrero	Emilio Sagi
1988	La chulapona	Federico Romero Sarachaga and Guillermo Fernández-Shaw Iturralde	Federico Moreno Torroba	Gerardo Malla

=== The Ases Líricos and Isaac Albéniz Company ===
Year	Play	Playwright	Music Composer	Directed by
	La del manojo de rosas	Anselmo C. Carreño and Francisco Ramos de Castro	Pablo Sorozábal	
	La calesera	Emilio González del Castillo and Luis Martínez Román	Francisco Alonso	
	La del Soto del Parral	Anselmo C. Carreño and Luis Fernández de Sevilla	Reveriano Soutullo and Juan Vert	
	Los gavilanes	José Ramos Martín	Jacinto Guerrero	
	La Dolorosa	Juan José Lorente	José Serrano	
	La leyenda del beso	Enrique Reoyo, José Silva Aramburu and Antonio Paso	Reveriano Soutullo and Juan Vert	
	Doña Francisquita	Federico Romero Sarachaga and Guillermo Fernández-Shaw Iturralde	Amadeo Vives	
	El huésped del sevillano	Juan Ignacio Luca de Tena and Enrique Reoyo	Jacinto Guerrero	
	La tabernera del puerto	Federico Romero Sarachaga and Guillermo Fernández-Shaw Iturralde	Pablo Sorozábal	
	Bohemios	Guillermo Perrín y Vico and Miguel de Palacios	Amadeo Vives	
	La corte de Faraón	Guillermo Perrín and Miguel de Palacios	Vicente Lleó	
	Luisa Fernanda	Federico Romero Sarachaga and Guillermo Fernández-Shaw Iturralde	Federico Moreno Torroba	
	La viejecita	Miguel Echegaray	Manuel Fernández Caballero	
1994	La Parranda	Luis Fernández Ardavín	Francisco Alonso	Luis Balaguer
1990	La bruja	Miguel Ramos Carrión and Vital Aza	Ruperto Chapí	Ignacio Aranaz
1989	La Gran Vía	Felipe Pérez y González	Federico Chueca and Joaquín Valverde	José Osuna
1987	El Caserío	Federico Romero Sarachaga and Guillermo Fernández-Shaw Iturralde	Jesús Guridi	Luis Iturri
1985	La blanca doble	Enrique Paradas and Joaquín Jiménez	Jacinto Guerrero	Paco de Osca
1983	La rosa del azafrán	Federico Romero Sarachaga and Guillermo Fernández-Shaw Iturralde	Jacinto Guerrero	Evelio Esteve
1982	La Revoltosa	José López Silva and Carlos Fernández Shaw	Ruperto Chapí	Evelio Esteve
1982	La verbena de la Paloma	Ricardo de la Vega	Tomás Bretón	Evelio Esteve
1981	Agua, azucarillos y aguardiente	Miguel Ramos Carrión	Federico Chueca	Ángel F. Montesinos
1978	Las leandras	Emilio González del Castillo and José Muñoz Román	Francisco Alonso	Luis Sanz

== Television ==
=== Drama ===
Year	Title	Directed by
2019	Señoras del (h)AMPA	Jaime Botella
2017	Velvet Colección	Gustavo Ron
2005–2008	Amar en tiempos revueltos	Antonio Onetti, Rodolf Sirera
2004–2011	Cuéntame cómo pasó	Agustín Crespi
2002	Policías, en el corazón de la calle	Paloma Martín-Mateo
2001–2005	El comisario	Alfonso Arandia, José Ramos Paíno
2000	La ley y la vida	Raúl de la Morena
1998–2002	Periodistas	Daniel Écija
1998	La vida en el aire	Ignacio Mercero

=== Sitcom ===
Year	Title	Directed by
2013	Psicodriving	Albert Saguer
2004	¿Se puede?	Gustavo Pérez Puig
1998–2000	La casa de los líos	José Miguel Ganga
1998	Señor alcalde	Jaime Botella
1997	Los negocios de mamá	Luis Sanz
1997	En plena forma	Carlos Serrano, Domingo Solano
1996	Contigo pan y cebolla	Javier Elorrieta
1996	Hostal Royal Manzanares	Sebastián Yunyent
1995–1996	Canguros	José Miguel Ganga
1994	Hermanos de leche	Miguel Ángel Ibáñez, Carlos Serrano
1994	Habitación 503	José Pavón, Pedro Amalio López
1994	¡Ay, Señor, Señor!	Fernando Colomo
1993–1995	Los ladrones van a la oficina	Ramón Fernández
1992–1993	Menos lobos	Lorenzo Zaragoza
1991	Eva y Adán, agencia matrimonial	Francisco Montolío
1991	Tercera planta, inspección fiscal	Lolo Rico

=== Telefilms ===
Year	Title	Directed by
2008	Martes de Carnaval	José Luis García Sánchez
1998	Entre Naranjos	Josefina Molina
1997	La banda de Pérez	Ricardo Palacios
1996–1997	Turno de oficio: 10 años después	Manuel Matji
1995	La Regenta	Fernando Méndez-Leite
1994	Compuesta y sin novio	Pedro Masó
1991	El Quijote de Miguel de Cervantes	Manuel Gutiérrez Aragón
1990	La forja de un rebelde	Mario Camus
1989	Brigada Central	Pedro Masó

=== Television Drama and Spanish Revue ===
Year	Show	Directed by
1996	Las alegres cazadoras	José Luis Moreno
1995	Doña Mariquita de mi corazón	José Luis Moreno
1994	Encantada de la vida	Matilde Fernández Jarrin
1993	Celeste... no es un color	Víctor Andrés Catena
1988	Por la calle de Alcalá 2	Ángel F. Montesinos
1982	La Gaviota (Estudio 1)	Manuel Collado

=== Children and Teen's Show ===
Year	Show	Directed by
1995	Detrás de la puerta	Lolo Rico
1988	Los mundos de Yupi	Antonio Torets
1986	Sesame Street	Antonio Torets
1985	Auanbabulubabalambambú	Carlos Tena
1984–1988	La bola de cristal	Lolo Rico
1981–1983	La cometa blanca	Lolo Rico

== Cinema ==
=== Films ===
Year	Film	Directed by
2018	Tiempo Después	José Luis Cuerda
2008	Esperpentos	José Luis García Sánchez
2008	La vida en rojo	Andrés Linares
2004	Franky Banderas	José Luis García Sánchez
2003	Atraco a la tres...y media	Raúl Marchand
2002	La marcha verde	José Luis García Sánchez
2000	Adiós con el corazón	José Luis García Sánchez
1998	Las ratas	Antonio Giménez Rico
1997	Carreteras secundarias	Emilio Martínez Lázaro
1997	Memorias del ángel caído	Fernando Cámara, David Alonso
1997	Siempre hay un camino a la derecha	José Luis García Sánchez
1996	Love Can Seriously Damage Your Health	Manuel Gómez Pereira
1996	Nightmare for a rich man	Fernando Fernán Gómez
1996	Witches	Álvaro Fernández Armero
1995	Hermana, ¿pero qué has hecho?	Pedro Masó
1995	Suspiros de España (y Portugal)	José Luis García Sánchez
1995	Así en el cielo como en la tierra	José Luis Cuerda
1995	Nobody Will Speak of Us When We're Dead	Agustín Díaz Yanes
1995	El seductor	José Luis García Sánchez
1994	La mujer de tu vida	Fernando Fernán Gómez
1994	All Men Are the Same	Manuel Gómez Pereira
1993	Tres palabras	Antonio Giménez Rico
1991	Fuera de juego	Fernando Fernán Gómez
1991	Cómo ser mujer y no morir en el intento	Ana Belén
1991	Dyningar (The Ebro runs dry)	Saeed Assadi
1991	La noche más larga	José Luis García Sánchez
1989	Going South Shopping	Fernando Colomo
1989	The Flight of the Dove	José Luis García Sánchez
1988	Dawn Breaks, Which Is No Small Thing	José Luis Cuerda
1988	La diputada	Javier Aguirre
1981	La segunda guerra de los niños	Javier Aguirre

=== Short films ===
Year	Title	Directed by
2016	Nini	David Moreno
1997	¿Las cosas son como son... o como deberían ser? Dos historias... del mismo día	José Antonio Pastor
1982	Eres mi gula	Juan Forner
