= Pedro Muñoz (disambiguation) =

Pedro Muñoz is a municipality in the autonomous community of Castile-La Mancha, Spain.

Pedro Muñoz may also refer to:

== Arts and entertainment ==
- Pedro Muñoz Romero (born 1952), Mexican actor, producer and director better known as Pedro Damián
- Pedro Muñoz Seca (1879–1936), Spanish comic playwright
  - Pedro Muñoz Seca Municipal Theater, theatre in El Puerto de Santa María, Cadiz, Spain, named after the playwright

== Politics and government ==
- Pedro Muñoz Abrines (born 1967), Spanish politician
- Pedro Muñoz Aburto (born 1944), Chilean politician
- Pedro Muñoz (Costa Rican politician) (born 1968), Costa Rican politician
- Pedro Muñoz Leiva (born 1990), Chilean lawyer and politician
- Pedro Muñoz Rojas (fl. 1930s), Chilean politician
- Pedro Soares Muñoz (1916–1991), Brazilian politician

== Sports ==
- Pedro Muñoz (baseball) (born 1968), Puerto Rican baseball player
- Pedro Muñoz (Chilean footballer) (born 1986), Chilean football forward
- Pedro Muñoz (cyclist) (born 1958), Spanish cyclist
- Pedro Muñoz (Mexican footballer) (born 1966), Mexican football manager and former defender
