= Malena Gracia =

Spanish singer

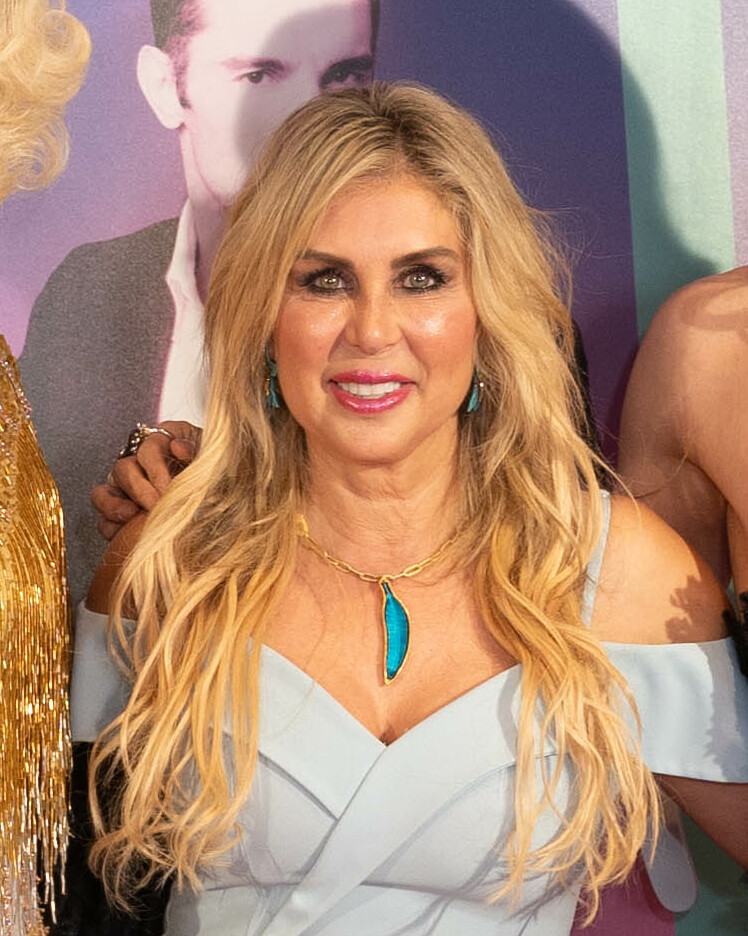
- Born: Almudena Gracia Manzano; 14 September 1969 (age 56); Madrid, Spain
- Occupations: Actress; singer; TV presenter
- Years active: 1987–present

Almudena Gracia Manzano (born 14 September 1969), known artistically as Malena Gracia, is a Spanish actress, singer, dancer, vedette, and pin-up model. She is best known for having obtained a triple platinum certification for her song "Loca", with more than 300,000 copies sold. She has also appeared on television series with high ratings.

== Career ==
Malena Gracia has worked in film, television, music, theater, and advertising. She has been a model and appeared in several magazines and Spanish TV programs. She was discovered by director and producer Valeriu Lazarov. She was a student at the Daniel Cicaret dance school. She studied solfège, singing, and acting with Luis Arnedillo and the professor of the Madrid Royal Conservatory, Inés Rivadeneira. Later she continued her classes with José Sepúlveda, at Ángela Carrasco's school, specializing in musicals. She shared a singing teacher with Shaila Dúrcal. Her early years in the world of dance and entertainment were not easy; her family was of humble origins and for seven years she was a victim of mistreatment of one of her ex-partners.

During the 1990s, Gracia worked on various television shows and began a musical career, as a singer of copla and Spanish songs, studying with maestro Julián Bazán. In 1992 she released her first Spanish song album Vete con él. Her style would later change to pop, although she always aspired to be a lyric singer.

Her television popularity grew on shows like De lo bueno el mejor and in sketches on the popular Antena 3 program Arévalo & cia, a Spanish adaptation of The Benny Hill Show. She participated in the first chapters of Hostal Royal Manzanares with Lina Morgan, a series that obtained audience levels of 46% and 8,500,000 spectators for its premiere. She also gained notoriety in the tabloid press. She presented Pase lo que pase on Telemadrid with Catalan comedian Jordi LP. She also participated in several Christmas specials on Telecinco with Lina Morgan.

At the end of the 90s, she formed the group Sex Bomb with Yola Berrocal and Sonia Monroy, which she would leave shortly afterward due to her incompatibility with Berrocal and Monroy.

In 1998 was chosen Playboy's European covergirl. She has posed nude or seminude for the magazines Playboy, Man, and Interviú (she appeared on seven occasions, one of them posing with Yola Berrocal).

Gracia had a romantic relationship with lawyer Emilio Rodríguez Menéndez, who was sentenced to nine years and six months in prison for fraud against the Public Treasury. After their breakup she suffered strong harassment and media persecution by the lawyer. In the year 2000, Malena Gracia filed a defamation lawsuit against his magazine Dígame, through which she obtained a judicial order to seize the magazine. The singer requested help from the Método 3 detective agency, which cooperated with the police to arrest him in 2005 in Argentina for having escaped to Paraguay to avoid the condemnation of the Spanish justice system. According to Gracia, the lawyer blackmailed her knowing that in the past she had briefly engaged in prostitution.

Two years after the separation of Sex Bomb, Malena joined the popular reality series Hotel Glam, where she was third finalist, and thanks to this she was able to get funding to start her musical career, with various summer and dance songs.

2003 saw the market launch of her successful song "Loca" on the Vale Music label. It achieved high levels of popularity on the radio and at events in Spain. Due to its high sales volume, it reached triple platinum status, becoming the quintessential song of that summer, was played for more than a decade in Spain, and was published in several compilations.

In 2005 she premiered the play Las corsarias in Barcelona together with Marlène Mourreau and Rosanna Walls. Its run only lasted three days, and it was later discovered to have been financed by the Gürtel plot, with €481,000 supplied by Francisco Correa Sánchez and his partner "El Bigotes".

Malena Gracia has tried to represent Spain in the Eurovision Song Contest on several occasions. She was presented to the Spanish preselection of 2008 with the song "Un poquito más", but was passed over in favor of Rodolfo Chikilicuatre. In 2009 she tried with "Quiero volar". In 2010 she once again presented her candidacy for the Spanish Eurovision preselection with her song "La Vida".

She has had numerous appearances on television as a contributor to the program Sálvame with Jorge Javier Vázquez, and DEC.

Among other reality TV appearances, she was the fourth finalist on the 2010 season of Supervivientes. This edition featured both famous and unknown contestants, with Gracia being the last famous one to be voted off.

In April 2012, she appealed on television regarding the possible abduction of her sister at birth. She was born prematurely on 30 August 1960, and for that reason she was taken to the Hospital Clínico San Carlos to gain weight in an incubator. The family went to see her on several occasions, but on the twelfth day they were told that she had died, without allowing the parents to see the body, which was consistent with procedures carried out in the kidnapping of children in Francoist Spain.

In March 2015 she presented her new album Miénteme on the Telecinco network, becoming a trending topic on Twitter.

In February 2016 she was romantically linked in the press with the well-known humorist Arévalo, a friend of the artist for over 20 years. Arévalo lost his wife in December 2015, and the story was later denied by both, which caused discomfort in the comedian for confusing a deep friendship.

In 2016, she was part of the cast of a theatrical adaptation of the 1962 film Atraco a las tres, directed by José María Forqué, premiered on 5 March at the Federico García Lorca Theater in Getafe. The play toured several venues, including the Carlos III Royal Theater of Aranjuez. In May 2016, she announced in the press that she was experiencing financial difficulties due to the death of her mother on Christmas 2015.

== Acting roles ==
=== Films ===
Year	Title	Director	Role	Notes
1987	Howl of the Devil	Paul Naschy	Girl	Minor role
1990	Tie Me Up! Tie Me Down!	Pedro Almodóvar	Nurse	Minor role
2007	Atasco en la nacional	Josetxo San Mateo	Malena	Supporting role
2008	219	Miguel del Barrio	Confidant	Short film
2009	La Poniponchi, una chica cuasi perfecta	Ivan G. Anderson	Monja	Supporting role
2012	Gente de fiesta	Javier de la Torre	Claudia	Television film
2015	El Anillo	David de la Torre	Leonor	Short film
2016	Relaxing Cup of Coffe	José Semprún	Girl in the swimming pool	Minor role
2017	Cosmética Terror	Fernando Simarro	Cameo	Minor role
2017	Luces	Alfredo Contreras	Estela	Supporting role

=== Dramatic TV series ===
Year	Title	Role	Notes
1996	Hostal Royal Manzanares	Nelly	1 episode
1997–1999	Arévalo y cia	Various characters	13 episodes
2000	Paraíso	Marga	1 episode
2006	Con dos tacones	Model	1 episode
2007	C.L.A. No somos ángeles	Malena	1 episode
2010	Sexo en Chueca	Famosa	1 episode
2016	Paquita Salas	Malena Gracia	1 episode
2017	Indetectables	Tatiana	2 episodes

=== Other TV series ===
==== Presenter ====
- Presentadora de Playboy TV (1998/1999)
- Pase lo que pase on Telemadrid, together with Jordi LP (2000)
- Show store on Canal 7 (2001/2002)
- Ahora o nunca on Cincoshop (2009/2010)
- Llamando se gana on Tienda en Veo (2010)
- Llamando se gana on Canal Club (2011)
- Marca y Gana on Cuatro TV (2011/2012)

==== Collaborations ====
- De lo bueno, lo mejor as flight attendant (1995/1996)
- Mamma Mia on Telemadrid as occasional contributor (2000/2002)
- Crónicas Marcianas on Telecinco as occasional contributor (2002/2005)
- TNT on Telecinco as occasional contributor (2005/2006)
- A tu lado on Telecinco as occasional contributor (2007)
- Oh la la as contributor (2007/2008)
- Sálvame Diario on Telecinco as occasional contributor (2009)
- Sálvame Deluxe on Telecinco as occasional contributor (2009)
- Vuélveme loca on LaSiete as reporter (2010)

==== Specials ====
- Especial año nuevo 1994 on Telecinco
- Especial navidad 1995 on La 1, together with Lina Morgan
- Viaja con nosotros, together with Javier Gurruchaga (1996)
- Diario de... la cirugía estética, presented by Mercedes Milá (2005)
- 21 Días Cómo convertirse en famoso on Canal Cuatro, with Adela Úcar (2010)
- Sálvame Stars on Telecinco, year-end special presented with Jorge Javier Vázquez (2017–2018)

==== Contests and reality shows ====
- Mañana serán estrellas on Telecinco, 2nd place (1993)
- El trampolín, 1st place (1993)
- Nuevos valores, 1st place (1994)
- El Super Trampolín, 1st place (1994)
- Hotel Glam on Telecinco, 3rd finalist (2003)
- Supervivientes on Telecinco, 4th finalist (2010)

=== Theater ===
- Theater Company of Ricardo Hurtado (1982/1986)
- Las cartas boca abajo by Miguel Mihura (1988)
- El canto de la cigarra by Alfonso Paso (1989)
- How The Other Half Loves by Alan Ayckbourn (2000)
- La decente by Alfonso Paso (2001/2002)
- Tres mujeres sin punto com (2012)
- Que descanse en paz, pero que lo haga ya (2013)
- Prohibido seducir a los casados (2014)
- Dos en apuros (2015/2016)
- Atraco a las tres by Carlos Pardo García (2016)

=== Musicals ===
- Maridos en paro by Zori y Santos (1994)
- Con ellos llegó la risa, together with María Isbert (1996)
- Vaya tela, together with the Calatrava Brothers (1997)
- Loca por ti, show of her own creation (1998)
- Atrévete, show of her own creation (1999/2001)
- Grease Tour, together with others such as singer Rebeca, Mónica Mey, and Sandra Morey (2002/2003)
- Vuelven las corsarias, together with Marlène Mourreau and Rosanna Walls (2005)
- Canción del Olvido (2015)

=== Other events ===
- Representative of Spain at the first Playboy Congress of 1999 on the island of Rhodes, Greece
- Performance at Dancing Queen Barcelona 2007
- Proclaimer of the 2007 festivals of Santa Cruz de Retamar (Toledo)
- Gay Pride Day Parade in Madrid almost every year
- Proclaimer of Gay Pride 2008
- Candidate to represent Spain at the Eurovision Song Contest three consecutive years (2008, 2009, 2010)

== Discography ==
=== Albums ===
Year	Title
1992	Vete con el: Label: Zafiro Records; Format: CD; Tracks: 10
2000	Atrévete: "Suena el teléfono"; "Medley 60s & 70s"; "Baby (Que derroche)"; "Una noche más"; "Pa'arriba pa'abajo"; "La vida en rosa"; "Medley rumba española"; "Yo soy malena"; "New york, new york"; "No llores por mi argentina"
2003	Loca: Label: Vale Music; Format: CD; Tracks: 10; 3× platinum: 300,000 copies sold
2004	Bombón latino: Label: Vale Music; Format: CD; Tracks: 3
2011	Soy la mejor: Label: P Music and Digimusic; Format: CD; Tracks: 10

=== Singles oficial a la venta ===
Year	Title
1999	My dreams
2003	Loca
2004	Bombón latino; Yo soy el fuego
2005	Infinitamente gay
2006	Chica mala
2008	Porteras de discoteca (Con Paco Clavel)
2011	Soy la mejor
2013	Move it
2015	Despertar
2016	Otra vez; No te detengas (Feat Lexter)
2017	Quiero más
2018	Mira como bailo (Feat Reina Saba); Despecho (Feat Lorna & Reina Saba & Miway); Despecho (Feat Lorna & Reina Saba & Miway) [Remix D.V]
2019	Quiero más (Feat Óscar Testera) [Remix]; Dulce tentación
2020	Provocando (Feat El Capo); Adicto a tí (Feat David Casa mayor); Quédate una noche (Feat Alex Cantó); Que pereza (Feat Shandy G)
2021	Empoderadas (Feat Christina Rapado); Popperas (Feat Cristini Couto)
2022	La última canción
2023	Yo te siento así; What a feeling; Never ending story
2024	Popperas (Feat Cristini Couto) [Versión House]; Forever Young (Remix); El hombre que me hacía reír; Menos mal que no (Con Gibrann)

=== EPs ===
Year	Title
1999	Malena
2008	Miénteme otra vez
2010	La vida
2013	Move it
2015	Miénteme; Despertar
2016	Otra vez
2018	Mira como bailo (with Reina Saba)

=== Singles adicional ===
- Próximamente
