= Aurora Redondo =

Spanish actress

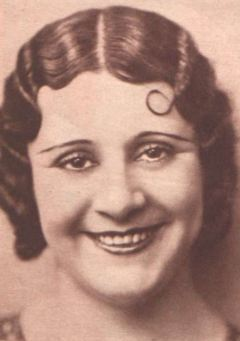
- c. 1930
- Born: Aurora Redondo Pérez; 1 January 1900; Barcelona, Spain
- Died: 9 July 1996 (aged 96); El Escorial (Madrid), Spain
- Resting place: Cementerio de la Almudena
- Occupation: Actress
- Years active: 1907–1993
- Spouse: Valeriano León (1925–1955)
- Awards: National Theater Prize (1962); Gold Medal of Merit in the Fine Arts (1993)

Aurora Redondo Pérez (1 January 1900 – 9 July 1996) was a Spanish actress.

== Biography ==
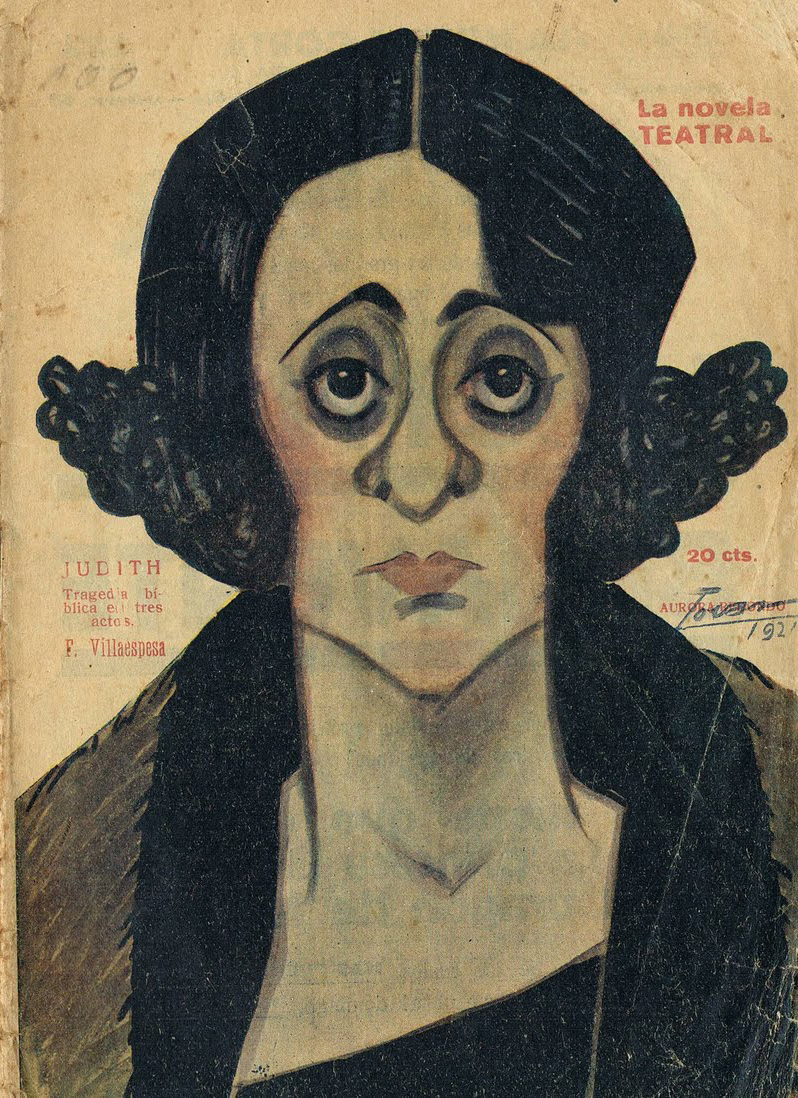
1921 caricature by Tovar

Aurora Redondo began her theatrical career at age 7. She debuted at the Teatro Romea with the play Doncell qui cerca Muller. After some performances in Barcelona, she traveled to Madrid, where she performed at the Teatro de la Comedia, in plays such as Que viene mi marido (1918), Los caciques (1920), and Es mi hombre (1921), all by Carlos Arniches. In 1937 she appeared at the Teatro Cómico of Buenos Aires in 400 performances of El Padre Pitillo by the same author. Arniches, in addition, was the best man of her wedding with actor Valeriano León in 1925.

The two worked together on many occasions, interpreting works by the Quintero brothers, Pedro Muñoz Seca, Jacinto Benavente, and Carlos Arniches, among others. The death of her husband in 1955 made Redondo continue her solo career with Las buenas personas, Aventura en lo gris (1963), Cita en Senlis (1963), Ninette y un señor de Murcia (1965), Buenos días condesita (1965), Un millón en la basura (1966), La vil seducción (1967), La pereza (1968), Petra regalada (1980), Las tormentas no vuelven (1982), The House of Bernarda Alba (1984), Don Juan Tenorio (1987), Maribel and the Strange Family (1989), and Peaches in Syrup, her last performance, which she gave at age 93.

Despite her dedication to theater, she also made inroads into film and television, notably her role in the 1983 series Anillos de oro.

Throughout her career she received many awards and recognitions, including the National Theater Prize (1962), the Silver Medal of Merit in the Fine Arts (1986), the Toda Una Vida award from the Spanish Actors Union (1991), the Segismundo Award from the Association of Stage Directors (1991), the Gold Medal of Merit in the Fine Arts (1993), and the Mayte Award (1994).

Aurora Redondo died from natural causes on 9 July 1996 at age 96. Her body was incinerated in the crematorium of the Cementerio de la Almudena the next day, and the urn with her ashes was interred in the family vault at the same cemetery.

== Selected roles ==
=== Theater ===
- El rayo by Pedro Muñoz Seca (1917)
- Que viene mi marido by Carlos Arniches (1918)
- Los caciques by Carlos Arniches (1920)
- Es mi hombre by Carlos Arniches (1921)
- La tela by Pedro Muñoz Seca (1925)
- El Padre Pitillo by Carlos Arniches (1937)
- El abuelo Curro by Luis Fernández de Sevilla (1945)
- Aventura en lo gris by Antonio Buero Vallejo (1963)
- Ninette y un señor de Murcia by Miguel Mihura (1965)
- Un millón en la basura by Vicente Coello (1966)
- Pecados conyugales by Juan José Alonso Millán (1966)
- La vil seducción by Juan José Alonso Millán (1967)
- La pereza by Ricardo Talesnik (1968)
- Tú me acostumbraste by Alfonso Paso (1970)
- La sopera by Robert Lamoreux (1972)
- La muchacha sin retorno by Santiago Moncada (1974)
- The Giants of the Mountain by Luigi Pirandello (1977)
- Maribel and the Strange Family by Miguel Mihura (1978, 1989)
- Petra regalada by Antonio Gala (1980)
- Las tormentas no vuelven by Santiago Moncada (1982)
- Isabel reina de corazones by Ricardo López Aranda (1983)
- The House of Bernarda Alba by Federico García Lorca (1984)
- Arsenic and Old Lace by Joseph Kesselring (1987)
- Celos del aire by José López Rubio (1990)
- Peaches in Syrup by Miguel Mihura (1993)

=== Film ===
- Santa Isabel de Ceres (1923)
- Mancha que limpia (1924)
- Cañas y barro (1954)
- El Padre Pitillo (1955)
- Amor bajo cero (1960)
- Honorables sinvergüenzas (1961)
- Ninette y un señor de Murcia (1965)
- Un millón en la basura (1967)
- Good Morning, Little Countess (1967)
- ¡Cómo sois las mujeres! (1968)
- De profesión, sus labores (1970)
- The Man Who Wanted to Kill Himself (1970)
- Coqueluche (1970)
- Separación matrimonial (1973)
- El mirón (1977)
- Tengamos la guerra en paz (1977)
- El hombre que yo quiero (1978)
- Corazón de papel (1982)
- Bicycles Are for the Summer (1984)
- Violines y trompetas (1984)
- Caminos de tiza (1988)
- Siempre Xonxa (1989)
- Yo soy ésa (1990)
- Mala yerba (1991)
- Dos hombres y una mujer (1994)
- El cianuro... ¿solo o con leche? (1994)

=== Television ===
- Novela
  - Roberto, amor mío (23 May 1965)
  - Viento del Norte (30 May 1977)
  - Lord Arthur Savile's Crime (8 May 1978)
- Estudio 1
  - El landó de seis caballos (4 June 1968)
  - Ninette, modas de París (21 April 1970)
  - Una muchachita de Valladolid (2 March 1973)
  - Ocho mujeres (29 June 1973)
  - Life on a Thread (28 September 1973)
  - Don Juan Tenorio (2 November 1973)
  - La desconocida de Arrás (16 March 1978)
  - La tercera palabra (25 October 1978)
  - El orgullo de Albacete (22 November 1978)
  - La guerra empieza en Cuba (20 December 1978)
  - Pygmalion (21 February 1979)
  - Celos del aire (25 April 1979)
  - El cianuro... ¿solo o con leche? (1989)
  - Isabel reina de corazones (7 August 1984)
- El último café
- Hora once
  - Lord Arthur Savile's Crime (13 February 1970)
- Animales racionales
  - Guardias y ladrones (17 October 1973)
- Noche de teatro
  - Ninette y un señor de Murcia (31 May 1974)
- Los maniáticos
  - Propiedad horizontal (20 August 1974)
- El quinto jinete
  - El demonio (15 December 1975)
- Que usted lo mate bien
  - El túnel (13 February 1979)
  - La rifa (20 March 1979)
- Historias para no dormir
  - El trapero (27 September 1982)
- Anillos de oro (1983)
- La comedia
  - Las tormentas no vuelven (22 November 1983)
  - The Importance of Being Earnest (13 March 1984)
- Tablón de anuncios (1984)
- Platos rotos
  - Sábado, maldito sábado (25 December 1985)
- La voz humana
  - Casi un matrimonio (11 July 1986)
- Històries de cara i creu
  - I visca la música (20 February 1987)
- El mar y el tiempo
  - Anselmo Gato, dibujante (23 December 1987)
  - Doña Eusebia, la madre (30 December 1987)
- Los mundos de Yupi
  - La llegada (18 April 1988)
- Pero ¿esto qué es? (1989–1990)
- Primera función
  - La decente (9 March 1989)
  - El cianuro... ¿solo o con leche? (30 March 1989)
  - Madrugada (19 October 1989)
  - Las cometas (16 November 1989)
- Celia (1993)
- Canguros
  - Margarita se llama mi amor (6 January 1995)
- Los ladrones van a la oficina
  - El rosario de su madre (3 May 1995)
  - El hombre con rostro (15 November 1995)
  - Estamos en obras (29 November 1995)
