= Pirates of Malaysia =

- Theatrical release poster
- Italian: I pirati della Malesia
- Directed by: Umberto Lenzi
- Screenplay by: Víctor Andrés Catena; Jaime Comas Gil; Ugo Liberatore
- Based on: A novel by Emilio Salgari
- Produced by: Solly V. Bianco
- Starring: Steve Reeves; Jacqueline Sassard; Andrea Bosic
- Cinematography: Federico G. Larraya; Angelo Lotti
- Edited by: Jolanda Benvenuti
- Music by: Giovanni Fusco
- Production companies: Euro International Film; La Societe des Films Sirius; Lacy International
- Release date: 16 October 1964 (Italy)
- Running time: 110 minutes
- Countries: Italy; France; Spain

Pirates of Malaysia (Italian: I pirati della Malesia) is a 1964 swashbuckler directed by Umberto Lenzi and starring Steve Reeves as Sandokan the pirate. This film was a sequel to Reeve's 1963 film Sandokan the Great, also directed by Lenzi. Malaysian rebel Sandokan, with his group of renegades, tries to thwart a British general from forcing the good Sultan Hassim to resign in favour of the Imperial crown.

== Plot ==
The cruel Lord James Guillonk, faithful steward of Queen Victoria, is governor of the territories of Borneo and Malaysia. His archenemy is the Indian pirate Sandokan, who along with his band of rebels, the Tigers, has been leading attacks against the British forces.

This time, Sandokan again faces off against the governor, Lord Guillonk, who is waging a campaign against Tremal-Naik, a Hindu opposed to the British. Tremal-Naik tells Sandokan of the Thugs, a secret sect of Hindu fanatics that worship the bloody goddess Kali. The Thugs have kidnapped Tremal-Naik’s beloved, and are holding her in their dungeon. When his beloved mysteriously escapes from the Thug dungeon, only to fall into the hands of Lord Guillonk, Sandokan prepares for a new battle against the governor.

== Cast ==
- Steve Reeves as Sandokan
- Jacqueline Sassard as Hada
- Andrea Bosic as Yanez
- Mimmo Palmara as Tremal Naik
- Pierre Cressoy as Captain
- Leo Anchóriz as Lord Brook
- Franco Balducci as Sambigliong
- Giuseppe Addobbati as Muda
- Dakar as Kammamuri
- Rik Battaglia as Sambigliong
- Nando Gazzolo as Clinton
- George Wang as Sho Pa
- Nazzareno Zamperla as Durango (credited as Nick Anderson)

== Production ==
Pirates of Malaysia had a screenplay credited to Victor Andres Catena, Jaime Comas Gil, and Ugo Liberatore. The film was adapted by Liberatore and based on the novel by Emilio Salgari.

== Release ==
Pirates of Malaysia was released in Italy on 16 October 1964 with a running time of 110 minutes.
