= Jaime Comas =

Spanish screenwriter and film producer (1936–2021)

Jaume Comas
- Born: Jaume Comas i Gil; 1936; Terrassa, Barcelona, Spain
- Died: 21 December 2021 (aged 84–85); Spain
- Occupation(s): Screenwriter and film producer

Jaume Comas Gil (1936 – 21 December 2021) was a Spanish screenwriter and film producer.

Comas wrote the screenplay for Fistful of Dollars (1964) along with A. Bonzzoni, Víctor Andrés Catena and Sergio Leone; Il cacciatore di squali (1979), directed by Enzo G. Castellari; and La sfinge d'oro (1967) along with Raphael Sanchez Campoy, Adriano Bolzoni and José Antonio Biondi.

He founded Ocean Films.

Comas died on 21 December 2021, at the age of 85. His funeral was held at Iglesia de Santa María de Caná on 19 January 2022 in Pozuelo de Alarcón.

== Filmography ==
- Diario de una becaria (2003)
- Héroes sin patria (1999)
- The Sea Change (1998)
- Outrage! (1993)
- La iguana (1988)
- A Man Called Rage (1984)
- Adam and Eve (1983)
- Pánico (1982)
- Do It with the Pamango (1980)
- Cabo Blanco (1980)
- Infierno en la selva (1979)
- El cazador de tiburones (1979)
- Encuentro en el abismo (1979)
- La que arman las mujeres (1969)
- The Glass Sphinx (1967)
- Danger!! Death Ray (1967)
- Los piratas de Malasia (1964)
- El espontáneo (1964)
- A Fistful of Dollars (1964)
- Three Sergeants of Bengal (1964)
- Sandokan the Great (1963)
