= Alfonso Ussía =

Spanish journalist (1948–2025)

Alfonso de Ussía y Muñoz-Seca (12 February 1948 – 5 December 2025) was a Spanish writer and journalist.

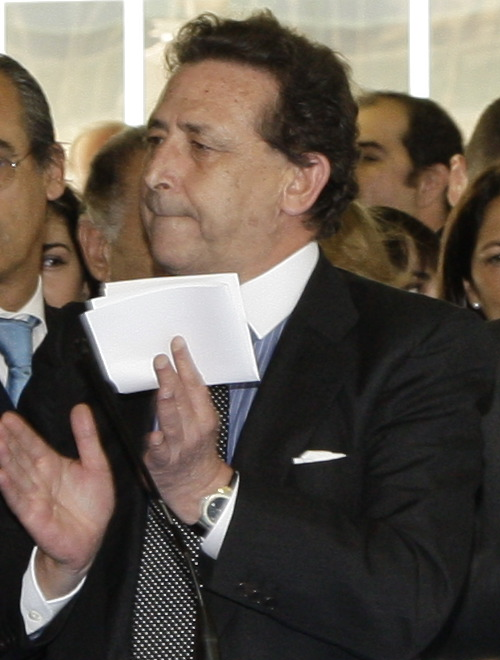
Ussía in 2008

== Life and career ==
Ussía was born in Madrid on 12 February 1948. He was the second son of Luis de Ussía y Gavaldá, 2nd Count of the Gaitanes, and his wife María de la Asunción Muñoz-Seca y Ariza. He was the maternal grandson of the playwright Pedro Muñoz Seca,

Although most of his career as a columnist was spent in the newspaper ABC, he worked for the newspapers Diario 16 and Ya, and the magazines Las Provincias, Litoral and El Cocodrilo, being director of the latter.

He was awarded the Grand Cross of Naval Merit, Knight Grand Cross of the Order of the Second of May, Silver Cross of the Order of Merit of the Civil Guard and the Gold Medal of the Community of Madrid.

Ussía died on 5 December 2025, at the age of 77.
