= Ussía =

Ussía is a surname. Notable people with the surname include:

- Alfonso Ussía (1948–2025), Spanish writer and journalist
- Jaime Milans del Bosch y Ussía (1915–1997), Spanish lieutenant general
