= Víctor Andrés Catena =

Spanish screenwriter and director

- Born: 1925; Spain
- Died: 2 May 2009 (aged 84); Málaga, Andalusia, Spain
- Other names: Víctor A. Catena
- Occupation(s): Screenwriter and film and television director

Víctor Andrés Catena (1925 – 2 May 2009) was a Spanish screenwriter and film, television and theater director.

Originally titled as Ray el Magnífico, he wrote the story of A Fistful of Dollars (1964), and I pirati della Malesia (1964), both along Jaime Comas. He directed El último tranvía, starring Lina Morgan.

He debuted as a theater writer with Crónica de un cobarde, released in 1966 and was directed by him. He also directed Sé infiel y no mires con quién, starring Pedro Osinaga; and Don Juan o el amor a la geometría.

He was the director of the Aula de Cultura de la Universidad de Granada, and there it was premiered Romeo and Juliet. He influenced Rafael Pérez Estrada.

He died on 2 May 2009 at the age of 84.

== Filmography ==
=== Writer ===
- Pánico (1982)
- Do It with the Pamango (1980)
- Cabo Blanco (1980)
- Ellas los prefieren... locas (1976)
- Kill Django... Kill First (1971)
- M.M.M. 83 (1966)
- Three Sergeants of Bengal (1964)
- I pirati della Malesia (1964)
- A Fistful of Dollars (1964)
- El espontáneo (1964)
- Sandokan the Great (1963)

=== Director ===
- ¡Qué grande es el teatro! (1999)
- Función de tarde (1994)
- Celeste... no es un color (1993)
- El último tranvía (1990)
- Sí al amor (1986)
- La comedia musical española (1985)
- Vaya par de gemelas (1983)
- Tarde de teatro (1980)

== Bibliography ==
- García Ruiz, Víctor; Torres Nebrera, Gregorio (2002). Historia y antología del teatro español de posguerra (1940-1975): 1966-1970. Editorial Fundamentos. ISBN 9788424509613.
