= Enrique García Álvarez =

Enrique García Álvarez may refer to:

- Enrique García Álvarez (actor)
- Enrique García Álvarez (playwright)
