= Nazzareno Zamperla =

Italian actor (1937–2020)

- Born: 25 April 1937; Treviso, Italy
- Died: 19 March 2020 (aged 82); Rome, Italy
- Other names: Nick Anderson, Neno Zamperla, Nazareno Zamperla
- Occupation(s): Actor, stuntman

Nazzareno Zamperla (25 April 1937 – 19 March 2020) was an Italian actor and stuntman.

== Career ==
Born in Treviso into a circus family, Zamperla came to Rome in 1949 and worked primarily in the 1950s and 1960s as a stunt performer. His focus was on the sword and sandal films. In the 1960s and 1970s, he transitioned into appearances as an actor in front of the camera, and his focus shifted to Spaghetti Western productions, where he was also known under the name of Nick Anderson, while also continuing working behind the camera as a gun master. Zamperla's brother Rinaldo has also appeared in movies.

== Filmography ==
- La Strada (1954) – Man Restraining Zampano from Attacking (uncredited)
- The Knight of the Black Sword (1956) – Soldier (uncredited)
- Il Conte di Matera (1958) – Marco
- The Pirate of the Black Hawk (1958) – Pirato con Ambassadore Francesa (uncredited)
- Ben-Hur (1959) – Roman Soldier with a Bow on Galley (uncredited)
- Slave of Rome (1961) – Roman Soldier
- Hercules and the Conquest of Atlantis (1961) – Man in Tavern Fight (uncredited)
- Samson Against the Sheik (1962) – Fighter (uncredited)
- Zorro alla corte di Spagna (de) (1962) – Paquito
- Gladiators 7 (1962) – Vargas
- Tiger of the Seven Seas (1962) – Rick
- Zorro and the Three Musketeers (1963) – D'Artagnan
- Samson and the Slave Queen (1963) – Sadoch
- Sandokan the Great (1963) – Hirangù
- The Triumph of Hercules (1964) – Thief
- Pirates of Malaysia (1964) – Durango
- Adventures of the Bengal Lancers (1964) – Sgt. John Foster
- The Magnificent Gladiator (1964) – Orestes / Horatius
- Jungle Adventurer (1965) – Sitama's Man #1
- A Pistol for Ringo (1965) – Sancho's gang member
- Blood for a Silver Dollar (1965) – Phil O'Hara
- Seven Rebel Gladiators (1965)
- Seven Guns for the MacGregors (1966) – Peter MacGregor
- Kiss Kiss...Bang Bang (1966) – (uncredited)
- Sugar Colt (1966) – Soldier
- Up the MacGregors! (1967) – Peter MacGregor
- Seven Pistols for a Massacre (1967) – Tom, Peggy's Brother
- Your Turn to Die (1967) – Flash
- Seven Times Seven (1968) – Bananas
- Le bal des voyous (1968)
- Boot Hill (1969) – Franz – Acrobat
- Le tigri di Mompracem (1970) – (uncredited)
- Long Live Robin Hood (1971) – One of Robin's Men
- Lover of the Great Bear (1971) – Smuggler (uncredited)
- Those Dirty Dogs (1973) – Soldier (uncredited)
- Tony Arzenta (1973) – Man of Cutitta (uncredited)
- Three Tough Guys (1974) – Snake's henchman
- Street Law (1974) – Beard
- The White, the Yellow, and the Black (1975) – Sgt. Donovan
- Cry, Onion! (1975) – Oblò – 'Monocle'
- La madama (1976)
- California (1977) – Brother of Northern Soldier (uncredited)
- A Man on His Knees (1979)
- Buddy Goes West (1981) – Slim Henchman (uncredited)
- Banana Joe (1982) – Hitman (uncredited)
- Thunder Warrior (1983) – Thomas's Friend
- Rolf (1984) – Bearded mercenary
