= Los mundos de Yupi =

Spanish children's television show (1988–1991)

- Genre: Children's television; Educational
- Country of origin: Spain
- Original language: Spanish
- No. of seasons: 2
- No. of episodes: 162

Production
- Running time: 25 min.
- Production company: Televisión Española

Original release
- Network: TVE-1
- Release: 18 April 1988 – 27 March 1991

Related
- Los cuentos de Yupi

Los mundos de Yupi is a Spanish educational Children's television series that combines live-action, sketch comedy, animation, and puppetry. It was produced by Televisión Española (TVE) and was broadcast on TVE-1 between 18 April 1988 and 27 March 1991. The show replaced Barrio Sésamo and its format was identical to it.

The live-action segments of the series star the aliens Yupi and Astrako. Yupi is a full-body puppet operated and voiced by Consuelo Molina; while Astrako is played by Alfonso Vallejo. These live action segments are interspersed with educational animations, and with sketches starring puppets. The series was followed by Los cuentos de Yupi, starring only the puppets.

== Premise ==
In the first season, due to malfunctions in their spaceship, Yupi and Astrako, traveling from the planet Tacatón, are forced to land on Earth near a small village. There, they quickly win the friendship of the locals. Their adventures take place in the village and at the site of their spaceship's landing, as they attempt to repair it and find the fuel they need to return to their planet.

In the second season, Yupi and Astrako, along with some of their Earthling friends, board a spaceship that arrives in the village. Their adventures unfold inside the spaceship and on the magical planet where they landed.

The live action segments in both seasons are interspersed with educational animations, and with sketches starring puppets such as the astronauts Estiri and Grou, the scientists Pi and Tágoras, and the couple Tuco and Canica.

== Episodes ==
Season	Episodes	Originally released	
Season	Episodes	First released	Last released
1	79	18 April 1988	TBD
2	83	TBD	27 March 1991

== Cast ==
The live-action segments of the series star two aliens: the kid Yupi and the spaceship pilot Astrako. Yupi is a full-body orange puppet operated and voiced by Consuelo Molina; while Astrako is played by Alfonso Vallejo. Some of the villagers in season one were played by Isabel Ordaz, Aurora Redondo, Luis Perezagua, and Lara de Miguel. Luis Barbero joined in season two as an earthling who lived on the magical planet. Among the actors who lent their voices to the puppets were Carlos Revilla, José Luis Gil, and Ana de Lima. Penélope Cruz made one of her first acting appearances as Sleeping Beauty in an episode of season two.

== Production ==
Televisión Española (TVE) which had been producing Barrio Sésamo in partnership with Children's Television Workshop (CTW), decided to end this collaboration and replace the series with a similar one produced in-house. TVE filmed Los mundos de Yupi entirely at its studios, where the sets for the live-action segments were built to full size. For the establishing shots of the fictional village, a meticulous scale model was built that reproduced even the smallest details. Yupi and the other puppets used in the show were designed by the company Harrison/Erickson in its New York studio. The opening theme song was composed by Carlos Vizziello and Tina Alarcón and has different lyrics in each season.

The 162 episodes of the two seasons of the series were first broadcast on TVE-1 between 18 April 1988 and 27 March 1991. The series was also broadcast on TVE Internacional, and later on other networks in Latin America.

== Legacy ==
The series was followed by Los cuentos de Yupi where in every 11-minute episode Yupi presents a famous tale which is recreated by the other puppets.

The publishing house Planeta DeAgostini launched a collection of thirty children's comic books titled Lo que sabe Yupi de..., in which Yupi explains a topic in a didactic way in each of them.

"Vivir/estar en los mundos de Yupi" has become a colloquial expression in Spanish that means "living/being in a fantasy world".
