= Supervivientes: Perdidos en Nicaragua (2010) =

- Presented by: Jesús Vázquez
- No. of days: 81
- No. of castaways: 20
- Winner: María José Fernández
- Runner-up: Deborah Arenas
- Location: Pearl Cays, Nicaragua
- No. of episodes: 13

Release
- Original network: Telecinco
- Original release: May 6 – July 25, 2010

Season chronology
- ← Previous; 2009 Next → 2011

Supervivientes 2010: Perdidos en Nicaragua is the eleventh season of Survivor to air in Spain. It was broadcast on Telecinco from May 6, 2010 to July 25, 2010. For the fifth consecutive year, Jesús Vázquez acted as the main host, with Eva Gonzalez and Emma Garcia acting as hosts of the special late night talk portion of the show.

== Season summary ==
The main twist this season was that the contestants were both celebrities and regular citizens. As part of this twist, the "Anonymous", as the regular citizens were called, had to survive a public vote in order to live on the main island with the celebrities. This was the first time that non-celebrities took part in the program since "Aventura en Africa" back in 2005. Ultimately, it was María José Fernández who won this season over fellow unknowns Deborah Arenas and Javier "Parri" Parrado.

== Finishing order ==
Contestant	Occupation/Famous For	Original tribe	Switched tribe	Merged tribe	Finish
Miriam Blanco; 25, Ourense	Sports instructor	Anonymous			Lost challenge Day 7
Consuelo Berlanga; 55, Aguilar de la Frontera	Journalist	Celebrity			1st Voted Out; Day 7
Nerea Echaide; 34, San Sebastián	Waitress	Anonymous	Celebrity		2nd Voted Out; Day 14
Beatriz González-Rico; 29, Madrid	Gran Hermano 6 housemate	Celebrity	Anonymous	Merged Tribe	3rd Voted Out; Day 21
Carla Pereyra; 22, Paraná	Model	Celebrity		Merged Tribe	4th Voted Out; Day 21
Javier Quiñones; 37, Sevilla	Actor and comedian	Celebrity		Merged Tribe	5th Voted Out; Day 21
Miguel Macías; 45, Telde	Personal trainer	Anonymous		Merged Tribe	Left Competition; Day 24
Víctor Roldán; 30, Terrassa	Nurse	Anonymous		Merged Tribe	6th Voted Out; Day 28
Óscar Higares; 38, Madrid	Bullfighter	Celebrity		Merged Tribe	7th Voted Out; Day 35
Mireia Canalda; 27, Barcelona	Model and reporter	Celebrity		Merged Tribe	8th Voted Out; Day 42
Román Irigoyen; 30, Leioa	Firefighter	Anonymous		Merged Tribe	Evacuated; Day 48
Rafa Mora; 27, Sagunto	MyHyV star	Celebrity		Merged Tribe	9th Voted Out; Day 49
Guillermo Martín; 29, Valencia	OT 2005 contestant	Celebrity		Merged Tribe	10th Voted Out; Day 56
Miguel Ángel Perdiguero; 37, Madrid	Former pro cyclist and politician	Celebrity		Merged Tribe	11th Voted Out; Day 63
Sonia Arenas; 32, Granada	Gran Hermano 4 housemate			Merged Tribe	12th Voted Out; Day 70
Beatriz Trapote; 29, Madrid	Journalist	Celebrity		Merged Tribe	13th Voted Out; Day 77
Malena Gracia; 41, Madrid	Singer			Merged Tribe	14th Voted Out; Day 77
Javier "Parri" Parrado; 26, Ceuta	Mathematics student	Anonymous		Merged Tribe	Third Place; Day 80
Deborah Arenas; 25, Barcelona	Shopgirl	Anonymous		Merged Tribe	Runner-Up; Day 80
María José Fernández; 51, Bilbao	Jewelry appraisers	Anonymous		Merged Tribe	Sole Survivor; Day 80

== Nominations ==
	Week 1	Week 2	Week 3		Week 4	Week 5	Week 6	Week 7	Week 8	Week 9	Week 10	Week 11		Final		Total votes
Mª José	Beatriz	Nerea	Bea	Immune	Beatriz	Beatriz; Rafa	Mireia; Rafa	Guillermo; Rafa	Guillermo; Miguel Ángel	Beatriz; Miguel Ángel	Sonia	Beatriz	Nominated	Sole Survivor (Day 80)		22
Déborah	Miguel Ángel	Mª José	Bea	Nominated	Beatriz	Beatriz; Mireia	Beatriz; Mireia	Beatriz; Rafa	Beatriz	Miguel Ángel	Malena	Mª José	Finalist	Runner-Up (Day 80)		3
Parri	Beatriz	Nerea	Bea	Immune	Beatriz	Óscar	Beatriz	Guillermo	Guillermo; Malena	Beatriz; Miguel Ángel	Sonia	Beatriz	Finalist	Third Place (Day 80)		6
Malena	Not in the game							Immune	Guillermo; Miguel Ángel	Mª José; Parri	Mª José	Parri	Nominated	Eliminated (Day 77)		5
Beatriz	Consuelo	Bea	Bea	Nominated	Mireia	Mª José; Mireia	Mª José; Mireia	Guillermo; Rafa	Malena; Sonia	Mª José; Parri	Parri	Parri	Eliminated (Day 77)			29
Sonia	Not in the game							Immune	Guillermo; Miguel Ángel	Mª José; Parri	Mª José	Eliminated (Day 70)				5
M. Ángel	Consuelo	Carla	Mª José	Immune	Víctor	Beatriz; Mireia	Mª José; Mireia	Beatriz; Mª José	Malena; Sonia	Mª José; Parri	Eliminated (Day 63)					11
Guillermo	Consuelo	Carla	Miguel	Immune	Román	Mª José; Mireia	Mª José; Mireia	Beatriz; Román	Malena; Sonia	Eliminated (Day 56)						7
Rafa	Beatriz	Bea	Mª José	Immune	Román	Mireia; Mª José	Mª José; Mireia	Beatriz; Mª José	Eliminated (Day 49)							7
Román	Miguel Ángel	Nerea	Bea	Immune	Beatriz	Beatriz; Óscar	Beatriz; Mireia	Guillermo; Rafa	Left Competition (Day 48)							4
Mireia	Consuelo	Bea	Bea	Immune	Beatriz	Mª José; Román	Beatriz; Mª José	Eliminated (Day 42)								15
Óscar	Consuelo	Bea	Miguel	Immune	Beatriz	Mireia; Déborah	Eliminated (Day 35)									1
Víctor	Miguel Ángel	Nerea	Bea	Immune	Beatriz	Eliminated (Day 28)										0
Miguel	Miguel Ángel	Nerea	Bea	Immune	Beatriz	Left Competition (Day 24)										2
Javi	Consuelo	Mireia	Déborah	Nominated	Eliminated (Day 21)											0
Carla	Consuelo	Beatriz	Déborah	Nominated	Eliminated (Day 21)											2
Bea	Beatriz	Rafa	Mª José	Eliminated (Day 21)												12
Nerea	Miguel Ángel	Mª José	Eliminated (Day 14)													5
Consuelo	Miguel Ángel	Eliminated (Day 7)														7
Miriam	Beatriz	Lost Vote (Day 7)														0
Notes	See note 1, 2	See note 3	None	See note 4	See note 5	See note 6	See note 7	See note 8	See note 9	See note 10	See note 11	See note 12	See note 13	None		
Nominated by Tribe					Beatriz	Beatriz; Mireia	Mª José; Mireia	Beatriz; Rafa	Guillermo; Malena	Mª José; Parri	Mª José; Sonia	Beatriz				
Nominated by Leader					Víctor	Óscar	Beatriz	Guillermo	Beatriz	Miguel Ángel	Parri	Mª José				
Nominated	All; Anonymous	Bea; Nerea	Bea; Mª José	Beatriz; Carla; Déborah; Javi	Beatriz; Víctor	Beatriz; Mireia; Óscar	Beatriz; Mª José; Mireia	Beatriz; Guillermo; Rafa	Beatriz; Guillermo; Malena	Mª José; Miguel Ángel; Parri	Mª José; Parri; Sonia	Beatriz; Mª José	Malena; Mª José	Déborah; Mª José; Parri		
Nominated	Consuelo; Miguel Ángel	Bea; Nerea	Bea; Mª José	Beatriz; Carla; Déborah; Javi	Beatriz; Víctor	Beatriz; Mireia; Óscar	Beatriz; Mª José; Mireia	Beatriz; Guillermo; Rafa	Beatriz; Guillermo; Malena	Mª José; Miguel Ángel; Parri	Mª José; Parri; Sonia	Beatriz; Mª José	Malena; Mª José	Déborah; Mª José; Parri		
Eliminated	Miriam; 5.1% to save	Nerea; 52% to eliminate	Bea; 80% to eliminate	Carla; 45% to eliminate	Víctor; 53% to eliminate	Óscar; 49% to eliminate	Mireia; 77% to eliminate	Rafa; 87% to eliminate	Guillermo; 38% to eliminate	Miguel Ángel; 70% to eliminate	Sonia; 82% to eliminate	Beatriz; 70% to eliminate	Malena; 50.7% to eliminate	Parri; 10.32% to win (out of 3)	Déborah; 49.6% to win	
Eliminated	Consuelo; 75% to eliminate	Nerea; 52% to eliminate	Bea; 80% to eliminate	Javi; 35% to eliminate	Víctor; 53% to eliminate	Óscar; 49% to eliminate	Mireia; 77% to eliminate	Rafa; 87% to eliminate	Guillermo; 38% to eliminate	Miguel Ángel; 70% to eliminate	Sonia; 82% to eliminate	Beatriz; 70% to eliminate	Malena; 50.7% to eliminate	Parri; 10.32% to win (out of 3)	Mª José; 50.4% to win	

- Candidates to be contestants (Could not be nominated)
- Contestant was immune
- Contestants was leader and whoever they nominated would automatically face elimination (Immune)

=== Notes ===
- ^Note 1: In week one, all non-celebrity contestants were automatically nominated for elimination.
- ^Note 2: In round one of nominations, all contestants could nominate, but only the celebrity contestants could be nominated as the non-celebrities were nominated in a separate elimination vote.
- ^Note 3: In this case, the winners of the immunity challenge, Óscar and Parri were given a double vote.
- ^Note 4: As they lost the immunity challenge, Beatriz, Carla, Déborah and Javi were automatically nominated for elimination.
- ^Note 5: As the winner of the immunity challenge, Miguel Ángel was given the power to name a nominee.
- ^Note 6: As the winner of the immunity challenge, Parri was given the power to name a nominee.
- ^Note 7: As the winner of the immunity challenge, Parri was given the power to name a nominee.
- ^Note 8: As the winner of the immunity challenge, Parri was given the power to name a nominee.
- ^Note 9: As the winner of the immunity challenge, Déborah was given the power to name a nominee.
- ^Note 10: As the winner of the immunity challenge, Déborah was given the power to name a nominee.
- ^Note 11: As the winner of the immunity challenge, Beatriz was given the power to name a nominee.
- ^Note 12: As the winner of the immunity challenge, Déborah was given the power to name a nominee.
- ^Note 13: As they lost the final immunity challenges, Malena and Mª José were automatically nominated for elimination.
