= Juan Ramón Sánchez (actor) =

- Born: Juan Ramón Sánchez Guinot; 1957; Trillo, Spain
- Died: 10 April 2008 (aged 51); Madrid, Spain
- Occupations: Actor; singer; sculptor; painter
- Years active: 1975–2008
- Known for: Barrio Sésamo
- Spouse: Chelo Vivares (m. 1979)

Juan Ramón Sánchez Guinot (1957 – 10 April 2008) was a Spanish actor, singer, sculptor and painter who played Chema the baker in the Spanish Sesame Street co-production Barrio Sésamo.

== Biography ==
During the mid-1970s, Sánchez performed in a music group, Red de San Luis.

Sánchez began his career on the TV series El señor Villanueva y su gente, before becoming one of the most beloved human stars of Barrio Sésamo in the 1980s.

While acting in Barrio Sésamo, Sánchez also appeared in a small role as a male nurse in Pedro Almodóvar's 1986 movie Matador. Sánchez has also appeared as a guest actor on the Spanish TV series Farmacia de guardia and Los ladrones van a la oficina.

Alongside with his wife Vivares and other actors from the series (such as José Riesgo), Sánchez appeared in a stage version of Barrio Sésamo during the late 1980s, touring through Spain.

More recently, Sánchez performed on stage and met with some success as a painter. He nevertheless admitted that people still called him "Chema".

His last television performance was on Gala Infantil 2006, in a "¿Como están ustedes?" ("How are you?") segment. With Espinete, Don Pimpón, and Ana, he sang the Barrio Sésamo theme "Todos los del barrio" for the last time.

=== Personal life ===
Sánchez was married to Chelo Vivares, the actress who performed the full-bodied Muppet Espinete on Barrio Sésamo. They married before the beginning of their work together in 1983.

== Death ==
Sánchez died as a result of lung cancer in Madrid on April 10, 2008. He was 51 years old.
