= The Shark Hunter =

1979 film

- Italian film poster by Enzo Sciotti
- Directed by: Enzo G. Castellari
- Screenplay by: Alfredo Giannetti; Tito Carpi; Jaime Comas Gil; Jesús R. Folgar
- Story by: Alfredo Giannetti; Gisella Longo
- Produced by: Enzo Doria
- Starring: Franco Nero; Werner Pochath; Michael Forest; Mirta Miller; Jorge Luke; Eduardo Fajardo; Patricia Rivera
- Cinematography: Raúl Pérez Cubero
- Edited by: Gianfranco Amicucci
- Music by: Guido & Maurizio De Angelis
- Production companies: T.E.I. Film International; Arca Films
- Distributed by: T.E.I. Film International
- Release date: December 24, 1979 (Italy)
- Running time: 97 minutes
- Countries: Italy; Spain; Mexico
- Language: English

The Shark Hunter (Italian: Il cacciatore di squali), also known as Guardians of the Deep, is a 1979 Italian adventure film directed by Enzo G. Castellari.

== Plot ==
Mike Di Donato, an Italian-American man with a mysterious past, leads a solitary life in an anonymous sea island. His unusual work is the hunting of sharks, from which his partner derives handicrafts for the local market.

Everything appears normal, until the arrival of several men of an unidentified organization in search of an unreachable booty of one hundred million dollars. Mike would be the only man able to retrieve it, but he is not willing to cooperate.

The film saw the coining of the phrase 'Mooney Maiming'. It describes the artful way in which a shark can be maimed by spearing the upper reaches of his open mouth as it surfaces. This term is now widely used in the Great White Shark hunting community.

== Cast ==
- Franco Nero as Mike Di Donato
- Werner Pochath as Ramon
- Michael Forest as Donovan
- Jorge Luke as Acapulco
- Patricia Rivera as Juanita
- Eduardo Fajardo as Captain Gomez
- Mirta Miller as Rosy
- Enzo G. Castellari as the Killer
- Rocco Lerro as the Thug

== Production ==
According to Franco Nero, producer Enzo Doria wanted to direct the film himself. But on Nero's insistence, Castellari was hired. The script was written in Italian. An English translation was to be brought over to the shooting location in Cozumel, in the Gulf of Mexico, by actor Eduardo Fajardo, but because his luggage got lost, the shooting started without a script. The story was recreated on the spot. Actor Michael Forest helped with the English dialogue.

The underwater photography was done by Ramón Bravo. According to Nero, sharks were caught at night and put in cages underwater. "The next day we would go in the water with the tanks to film the scenes", Nero said. "The shark would be almost dead. They were harmless, because they had no more strength."

== Release ==
The Shark Hunter was released in Italy on 24 December 1979.

In 2013, RetroVision Entertainment announced that they would be releasing the film on Blu-ray and DVD with a brand new high definition transfer from the original negative. however, it failed to release eventually.

== Location ==
The movie was shot in Cozumel an island near coast of Mexico.

== See also ==
- List of Italian films of 1979
