= Adventures of the Bengal Lancers =

1964 film

- Directed by: Umberto Lenzi
- Written by: Víctor Andrés Catena; Fulvio Gicca Palli
- Story by: Umberto Lenzi
- Produced by: Domenico Seymandi
- Starring: Richard Harrison
- Cinematography: Federico G. Larraya; Angelo Lotti
- Music by: Giovanni Fusco
- Distributed by: Variety Distribution
- Release date: 1964
- Country: Italy
- Language: Italian

Adventures of the Bengal Lancers (Italian: I tre sergenti del Bengala, Spanish: Tres sargentos bengalíes, also known as Three Sergeants of Fort Bengal) is a 1964 Italian-Spanish adventure film directed by Umberto Lenzi (here credited as Humphrey Humbert) and starring Richard Harrison and Dakar.

== Plot ==
Three British soldiers stationed in Malaysia are sent to Fort Madras to help the commandant fight off an elusive bandit who is terrorizing the countryside.

== Cast ==
- Richard Harrison as Sgt. Frankie Ross
- Wandisa Guida as Mary Stark
- Ugo Sasso as Burt Wallace (credited as Hugo Arden)
- Nazzareno Zamperla as Sgt. John Foster (credited as Nick Anderson)
- Andrea Bosic as Col. Lee McDonald
- Luz Márquez as Helen
- Aldo Sambrell as Gamal / Sikki Dharma
- José Uria
- Marco Tulli
- Dakar
