= Last Man to Kill =

- Directed by: Umberto Lenzi
- Written by: Umberto Lenzi; Gianfranco Clerici
- Produced by: Fortunato Misiano
- Starring: Roger Browne; José Greci
- Cinematography: Augusto Tiezzi
- Music by: Angelo Francesco Lavagnino
- Release date: 1966
- Countries: Italy; France
- Language: Italian

Last Man to Kill (Italian: Un milione di dollari per 7 assassini, French: 1.000.000 de dollars pour 7 assassinats) is a 1966 Italian-French crime-spy film written and directed by Umberto Lenzi and starring Roger Browne, Erika Blanc and Dakar. The Italian title translates as A Million Dollars for Seven Killers. It was the fourth and last spy film directed by Lenzi.

== Plot ==
The father of a missing scientist hires a renowned detective to find his son and a valuable secret formula.

== Cast ==
- Roger Browne as Michael King
- José Greci as Ellen
- Antonio Gradoli as Pavlos
- Dina De Santis as Betty
- Monica Pardo as Lilli
- Tor Altmayer as Figuerez
- Erika Blanc as Anna
- Wilbert Bradley as Doney
- Carlo Hintermann as Manfred Simpson
- Dakar as Also (as Ales Dakar)
- Mark Trevor
