= Chelo Vivares =

Spanish actress (born 1952)

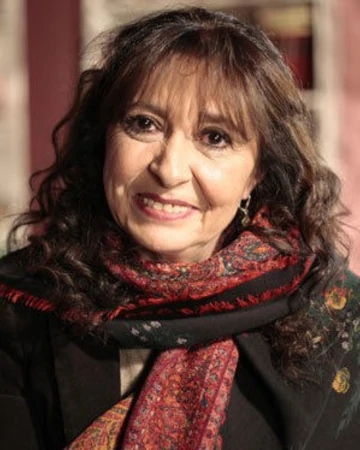
- Born: Consuelo Vivares; 21 April 1952 (age 74); Madrid, Spain
- Occupations: Actress; puppeteer
- Years active: 1975-present
- Known for: Barrio Sésamo
- Spouse: Juan Ramón Sánchez (m. 1979; died 2008)

Chelo Vivares (born Consuelo Vivares; 21 April 1952) is a Spanish actress who played Espinete on Barrio Sésamo, the Spanish version of Sesame Street, from 1983 until 1987.

== Biography ==
As a TV actor

Vivares began her career as an actress in Spanish television, making guest appearances on TV series such as Cuentos y leyendas (1975), La señora García se confiesa (1976) and even the prestigious Estudio 1 (1983). In 1979, she entered the dubbing field as a voice actress, first in the Peter Falk movie The In-Laws (dubbing Nancy Dussault), and then as minor characters in Fame.

In 1983, Vivares joined Barrio Sésamo as principal puppeteer, performing the full-bodied Espinete, the most identifiable Muppet on the series. Her work as Espinete kept her pre-occupied, but when Barrio Sésamo was cancelled in 1987, Vivares went back behind the microphone, dubbing Penelope Sudrow in the movie A Nightmare on Elm Street 3. She also reprised Espinete in a theatre version of Barrio Sésamo during the late 1980s, touring through Spain alongside other actors from the series such as Sánchez and José Riesgo. On-camera, Vivares played a dressmaker in the final episode of the Spanish series Farmacia de guardia (1995).She made multiple guest appearances on the TV crime drama El Comisario, notably as the distraught mother of a kidnapped child.

Voice acting

Vivares became more prolific as a voice actress, most often dubbing child roles or young male actors, such as the character Tommy in The Punisher (with Dolph Lundgren) and Peter Brady on The Brady Bunch. Her most substantial work was on The Simpsons as Ralph Wiggum, Todd Flanders, Martin Prince, Itchy, and others. Other animation dub credits include Bucky the squirrel in Disney's The Emperor's New Groove, Amy Wong on Futurama, Mandark on Dexter's Laboratory, Tails on Sonic the Hedgehog, Stan Marsh on South Park, and Sailor Neptune on Sailor Moon. Vivares was also heard in the original Spanish animated features La Leyenda del Viento del Norte (1992) and ¡Qué vecinos tan animales! (1998, Maite Ruiz de Austri) as Nicky, the little mouse (with fellow Barrio Sésamo puppeteer Emma Cohen as the mother mouse). She also voiced the principal character of "la señorita Ofelia" in multiple computer games adapting the Spanish comic-book Mortadelo y Filemón. Vivares continues to work primarily as a voice actress, however, dubbing the characters of Moaning Myrtle in the Harry Potter movies, Chloe on Smallville, and parts on Sabrina the Teenage Witch and Charmed. She also usually dubs into Castilian Spanish the actresses Ariane Ascaride and Shirley Henderson.

=== Personal life ===
Vivares was married to Juan Ramón Sánchez, who played Chema the baker on Barrio Sésamo, from 1979 until his death in 2008.
