= Consuelo Berlanga =

Spanish journalist

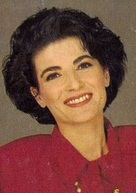
- Born: 18 February 1955 (age 71); Aguilar de la Frontera, Córdoba, Spain
- Occupation: Journalist
- Spouse: Ricardo Pita
- Awards: Antena de Oro Award – Television (1993)

Consuelo Berlanga (born 18 February 1955), is a Spanish journalist.

== Early life ==
Berlanga was born in Aguilar de la Frontera, Córdoba, Spain.

== Career ==
Berlanga's professional career has primarily been in television, though she has also done notable work in radio.

Her first experience in front of the camera was on Por la mañana (1987–1989), the daily program which Jesús Hermida directed and presented on Televisión Española.

After that show was canceled, she was signed by Chicho Ibáñez Serrador to present the game show Waku Waku, which she did from 1989 to 1991.

Berlanga later moved to Antena 3 where she hosted the daily magazine Tan contentos (1991–1992), followed by the game show Corazón de melón (1992), the musical Quédate con la copla (1992), and the children's show Cámara baja (1993). At the same time, she took advantage of the opportunity to work in radio, on the show Somos como somos (1993) on Antena 3 Radio.

Once her relationship with the private network ended, Berlanga moved to Seville, and for many years her professional development was linked to the Andalusian autonomous channel Canal Sur, where she presented the nostalgic Qué pasó con and Senderos de Gloria, a program created to pay homage to the anonymous faces of Andalusian life.

From November 2004 to August 2009 she hosted the program El Punto Berlanga on Punto Radio.

Berlanga was one of the contestants on the 2010 season of Survivor Spain. She was the first to be voted off, lasting seven days. At the end of that year she began to contribute to the series ¡Qué tiempo tan feliz! on Telecinco, hosted by María Teresa Campos, where she remained until 2014.

== Television career ==
- Por la mañana (1987–1989) on Televisión Española – Contributor
- Waku Waku (1989–1991) on Televisión Española – Presenter
- Tan contentos (1991–1992) on Antena 3 – Presenter and director
- Campanadas Fin de Año (1991) on Antena 3 – Presenter
- Corazón de melón (1992) on Antena 3 – Presenter
- Quédate con la Copla (1992) on Antena 3 – Presenter
- Cámara Baja (1993) on Antena 3 – Presenter
- Qué pasó con (1995–1996) on Canal Sur and Telemadrid – Presenter
- Por qué (1997) on Canal Sur – Presenter
- Canciones para el recuerdo (1997–1998) on Canal Sur – Presenter
- Senderos de Gloria (1999–2003) on Canal Sur – Presenter
- Gala de Andalucia (2003) on Canal Sur – Presenter
- Punto y Medio Verano (2006) on Canal Sur– Presenter
- El punto Berlanga (2004–2009) on Punto Radio – Presenter
- Survivor Spain (2010) on Telecinco – Contestant
- ¡Qué tiempo tan feliz! (2010–2014) on Telecinco – Contributor
- Gran Hermano VIP (2017) on Telecinco – Contributor
- Sábado Deluxe (2017) on Telecinco – Contributor

== Awards ==
- Antena de Oro Award – Television (1993)
