= Pedro Pérez Fernández =

Spanish dramatist

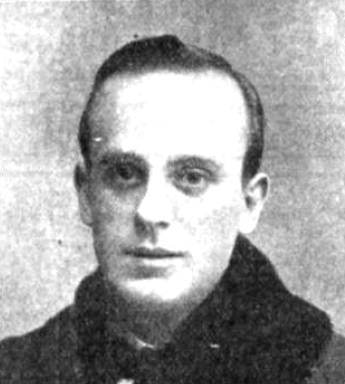
Portrait of Pedro Pérez Fernández

Pedro Pérez Fernández (1885 – 1956) was a Spanish dramatist. Born in Seville, he was one of the authors of comic theatre called the Astracanada.

He had a special and fruitful collaboration with Pedro Muñoz Seca (Los extremeños se tocan, 1927)

He wrote stories, articles and narrations for different weekly magazines. Its theater production - of considerable volume is in most of the cases in collaboration with other humorous authors of success. He cultivated the astracanada, sainete, the comedy, the zarzuela, and the called "humorous toy", within the commercial theater. Among the authors he collaborated with are Pedro Muñoz Seca, Luis Fernandez Ardavín, Fernando Luque or Enrique Garcia Alvarez.

As his friend Pedro Muñoz Seca, he was a Nationalist sympathizer and had to hide during the Spanish Civil War due to the risk of being executed (as indeed happened to his friend Pedro Muñoz Seca in November 1936).

He died in Madrid in 1956.
