= Los negocios de mamá =

Spanish television comedy

- Genre: Comedy; Family
- Directed by: Luis Sanz
- Starring: Rocío Dúrcal; José Sancho
- Country of origin: Spain
- Original language: Spanish
- No. of seasons: 1
- No. of episodes: 13 (Note: Only 7 episodes aired in 1997.)

Production
- Production companies: TVE; Videozapping

Original release
- Network: La Primera
- Release: 7 April – 19 May 1997

Los negocios de mamá is a Spanish comedy television series, starring Rocío Dúrcal and José Sancho, and directed by Luis Sanz. It aired in 1997 on La Primera.

== Premise ==
The storyline focuses on Ana (Rocío Dúrcal), a pro-business entrepreneur and mother of three children (played by María Adánez, Fernando Cuesta and Zoe Berriatúa), who decides to set up her own clothing shop Ana Suma y Sigue. Her husband (played by José Sancho) was a progressive of the generation of '68.

== Cast ==
- Rocío Dúrcal as Ana
- José Sancho as Ernesto
- María Adánez as Sandra
- Zoe Berriatúa as Félix
- Fernando García Cuesta as Armando
- Juan José Artero as Ismael
- María Luisa San José as Paloma
- Nicolás Dueñas as Castillo
- María Pujalte as Lucrecia
- Alicia Hermida as Enriqueta
- Luis Perezagua as Estanislao

== Production and release ==
Produced by Televisión Española (TVE) and Videozapping, directed by Luis Sanz, and filmed at TVE's studios in Prado del Rey, the series premiered on 7 April 1997 on La Primera. The first seven episodes aired averaged 2,900,000 viewers and a 16.9% audience share. Unable to overcome the viewership figures of its prime time rival Querido maestro, the series was cancelled after the 7th episode (aired on 19 May 1997), which earned a 15.1% audience share. The network decided to not air six completed episodes. The episodes had a running time of around 50 minutes.
