= Danger!! Death Ray =

- Theatrical release poster
- Directed by: Gianfranco Baldanello
- Written by: Dick Arthur; Juan Antonio Cabezas; Al Christian; Jaime Comas Gil; Aldo Cristiani; Domenico Paolella
- Produced by: Daniel P. Culvert
- Starring: Gordon Scott; Maureen Delphy; Nello Pazzafini as Ted Carter; Tullio Altamura as Tor Altmayer
- Music by: Gianni Ferrio
- Distributed by: Asdrúbal
- Release dates: January 28, 1967 (Italy); March 18, 1968 (Spain)
- Running time: 93 minutes
- Language: Italian

Danger!! Death Ray (Italian: Il Raggio infernale, lit. 'The Infernal Ray') is a 1967 Italian Eurospy secret agent spy film starring Gordon Scott.

The film was satirized in a 1995 episode of Mystery Science Theater 3000.

== Synopsis ==
Scientist Jean Karl Michael invents a death ray which, according to him, is for “peaceful purposes”. He arranges a demonstration of the ray to a group of European NATO representatives. During the demonstration, a group of enemy agents disguised as NATO officials steals the death ray, kidnaps the scientist, and escapes by car under the cover of night. Following a pursuit and gun battle, they escape by helicopter, which lands on a submarine and is discarded as the submarine submerges.

As Agent Bart Fargo is about to go on vacation, he is given the assignment of retrieving the death ray and saving the scientist. He travels to Barcelona on a lead to find an evil organization that may be behind this. Rooting out a nest of spies in an ever-enclosing trail, Fargo meets a lady when he hides in her house from the opposition and befriends an enemy agent who later helps him to stop the evil organization.

== Bibliography ==
- Blake, Matt; Deal, David (2004). The Eurospy Guide. Baltimore: Luminary Press. ISBN 1-887664-52-1.
