= Chema the baker =

Chema
- Barrio Sésamo character
- Portrayed by: Juan Ramón Sánchez

In-universe information
- Species: Human
- Gender: Male
- Occupation: Baker
- Nationality: Spanish

Chema, sometimes known as Chema el panadero (Chema the baker), is a character from Barrio Sésamo, the Spanish co-production of Sesame Street, portrayed by actor Juan Ramón Sánchez.

Chema is an adult human who appeared in the series' second period, from 1983 to 1987. He interacted with full-bodied Muppets Espinete and Don Pimpón.

A blond man who owns a bakery on the Barrio, Chema always wears a white T-shirt, white trousers and a white apron. The apron always shows flour stains, even when he is opening the bakery in the morning, supposedly coming from home. Chema even has his own solo songs, including "Panadero Soy" ("I Am a Baker").

Juan Ramón Sánchez has appeared as Chema in live productions of Barrio Sésamo since 1987, alongside actress Chelo Vivares as Espinete and José Riesgo as Julián.

== Influence ==
In the TV series Aída, Pepe Viyuela plays a gentle shopkeeper named Chema in homage to this character.
