= Anacleto Gets Divorced =

1950 film

- Directed by: Joselito Rodríguez
- Written by: Carlos Orellana; Joselito Rodríguez
- Based on: Anacleto Gets Divorced by Pedro Muñoz Seca and Pedro Pérez Fernández
- Produced by: Alfonso Sánchez Tello
- Starring: Carlos Orellana; Rosita Arenas; Rita Montaner
- Cinematography: Enrique Wallace
- Edited by: Fernando Martínez
- Music by: Jose de la Vega
- Production company: Astor Films
- Release date: September 7, 1950
- Running time: 109 minutes
- Country: Mexico
- Language: Spanish

Anacleto Gets Divorced (Spanish: Anacleto se divorcia) is a 1950 Mexican comedy film directed by Joselito Rodríguez and starring Carlos Orellana, Rosita Arenas and Rita Montaner. It was shot at the Clasa Studios in Mexico City. The film's sets were designed by the art director Carlos Arjona.

== Synopsis ==
A factory's guard has problems with his wife because of a co-worker's lies.

== Cast ==
- Carlos Orellana as Anacleto
- Rosita Arenas as Rosita
- Rita Montaner as Esperanza Castro
- Andrés Soler as Ladislao
- Miguel Arenas as Don Felipe
- Rogelio A. González as Carlos
- Bertha Lehar as Cocinera francesa
- Carlota Solares as Doña Carlota
- Jorge Casanova as Federico
- Antonio R. Frausto as Próspero
- Lidia Franco as Juanita
- Bobby Capó as Cantante

== Bibliography ==
- Wilt, David E. The Mexican Filmography, 1916 through 2001. McFarland, 2024.
