= Monstruos Supersanos =

Monstruos Supersanos title card

Monstruos Supersanos is a Sesame Street mini-series that debuted in June 2012. The 5 to 7-minute series focuses on activities and foods that keep one healthy. Sesame Workshop produced 26 episodes in English, which initially aired dubbed in Spain on Antena 3 as a Barrio Sésamo mini-series called Monstruos Supersanos. Around 2011, the segments were also released in Latin America.

Each episode featured framing scenes starring Elmo, followed by newly produced Muppet sketches and on-location film pieces. The film segments aren't retained in airings outside of Spain.

Excerpts from each episode are also available in the Antena 3 webpage, as well as a series of videos with Elmo and Spanish celebrities, such as singer David Bustamante, host Susanna Griso, chef Ferran Adrià and football player Gerard Piqué.

The series features main Sesame Street characters Elmo, Grover, Cookie Monster, Rosita, Bert and Ernie, Abby Cadabby and a new Muppet character, Dr. Ruster.

== International airings ==
Select segments have since been incorporated into Sesamstrasse, Plaza Sésamo, Sesamstraat, and Sezamkowy Zakątek as stand-alone Muppet pieces. The episodes also began airing in Dutch as Super Gezonde Monsters, featuring additional material to extend the shows to a 10-minute running time. The episodes of the show has also been dubbed for the Catalan dub Barrí Sésam. The episodes have also been incorporated into the episodes of the 2015 revival of Iftah Ya Simsim.

== Cast ==
=== Spanish Version ===
#	Character	Actor
1	Elmo	Miguel Antelo
2	Coco	Alfredo Marinez
3	Blas	Eduardo del Hoyo
4	Triqui	Jorge Garcia Insua

=== English Version ===
#	Character	Actor
1	Elmo	Kevin Clash
2	Bert	Eric Jacobson
3	Ernie	Steve Whitmire
4	Grover	Eric Jacobson
5	Cookie Monster	David Rudman
6	Rosita	Carmen Osbahr
7	Abby Cadabby	Leslie Carrara-Rudolph
