= Pedro Muñoz Seca Municipal Theater =

Theater in Cádiz, Spain

Pedro Muñoz Seca Municipal Theater Teatro Municipal Pedro Muñoz Seca
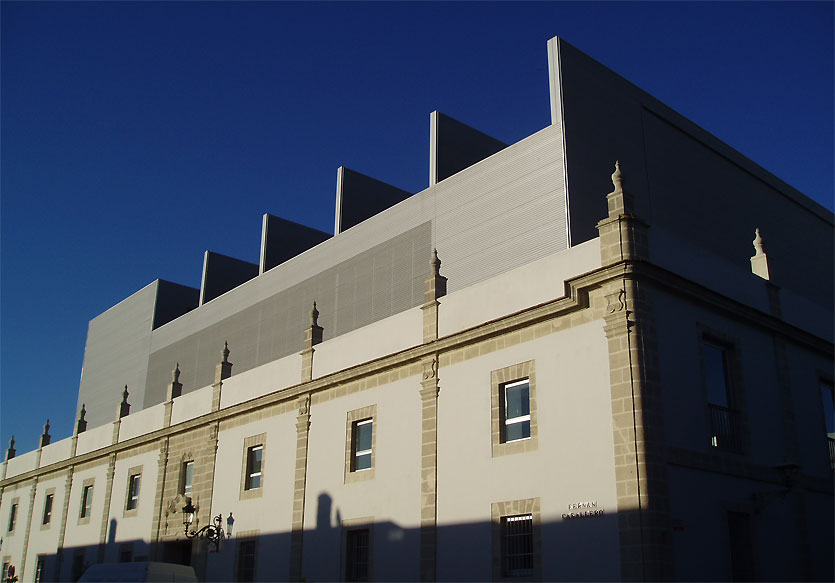

- Location in Andalusia
- Address: Plaza del Polvorista, 4 El Puerto de Santa María; Spain
- Coordinates: 36.5953°N 6.2280°W
- Capacity: 600
- Type: Municipal theater
- Current use: Teatro Municipal Pedro Muñoz Seca

Construction
- Opened: 2007
- Years active: 2007–present

The Pedro Muñoz Seca Municipal Theater (Spanish: Teatro Municipal Pedro Muñoz Seca) is a theater in El Puerto de Santa María, Cádiz, Spain. It is named after Pedro Muñoz Seca, a playwright originally from the city. It has 600 seats.

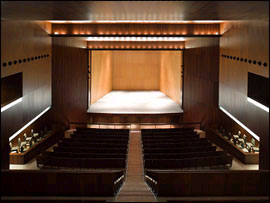
Theater interior

The theater is located in Polvorista Plaza (Plaza del Polvorista), in a building that served as a barracks for a cavalry regiment of the Spanish Army in the 18th century. El Puerto de Santa María's former Main Theater (Teatro Principal) was destroyed in a fire in 1984; this new Municipal Theater was inaugurated on October 27, 2007.
