= Dakar (actor) =

Peruvian Actor and Professional Wrestler

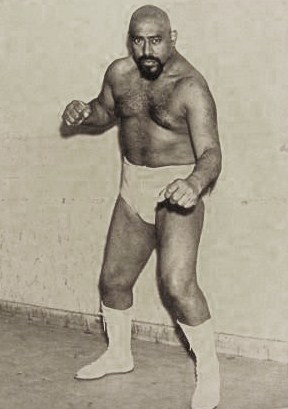
- Born: Alejandro Barrera; 9 July 1921; Cuzco, Peru
- Died: 14 September 2004 (aged 83); Rome, Italy
- Occupation: Actor
- Years active: 1964–1982

Dakar (born Alejandro Barrera; 9 July 1921 – 14 September 2004) was a Peruvian actor and professional wrestler. He appeared in more than twenty films from 1964 to 1982. He also was dedicated to professional wrestling in Argentina, and fought in the Luna Park against Martín Karadagián. In 1973 Dakar participated in the film Titanes en el ring.

== Death ==
Dakar Died of an Acute Lymphoblastic Leukaemia on September 14, 2004, at Rome, Italy.

== Selected filmography ==
Year	Title	Role	Notes
1964	Pirates of Malaysia	Kammamuri	credited as Alejandro Barrera Dakar
1964	Gladiators Seven	Jagull	
1964	Two Mafiosi Against Goldfinger	Molok	
1966	Last Man to Kill	Also	credited as Ales Dakar
1967	Mission Stardust		
1979	The Tigers of Mompracem		
1979	Zombi 2	Lucas	uncredited
1980	Zombie Holocaust	Molotto	
1982	Ator, the Fighting Eagle	High Priest of the Spider	
