= José Tamayo =

Spanish theatre director and producer

- Born: 16 August 1920; Grenada, Spain
- Died: 26 March 2003 (aged 82); Madrid, Spain
- Resting place: Cementerio de Granada

José Tamayo (16 August 1920 – 26 March 2003) was a Spanish theatre director and producer, best known for his dramatic and zarzuela plays, epitomized by Antología de la Zarzuela (Zarzuela anthology). Born in Granada, Spain in 1920, 24-year old Tamayo began his theatrical journey in 1944 as part of a university theater group in Granada. He founded the Lope de Vega Company and, after performing in Valencia, he traveled to Madrid, where his company became the resident company of the Teatro Fuencarral. With this company, he popularized the genre of zarzuela, even beyond Spain.

From 1954 to 1962, he served as the director of the Teatro Español, was an entrepreneur at the Teatro Bellas Artes, and directed the Teatro Lirico Nacional In the 1950s, he contributed to the Spanish theater scene by introducing works by authors such as Tennessee Williams and Arthur Miller (Death of a Salesman, 1952).

He received the Premio Max award of honor in 2002.
