= Barrio Sésamo =

Children's television series

- Genre: Children's television; Educational
- Based on: Sesame Street
- Written by: Lola Salvador, Alberto Aguilar, José Miguel Hernán (First Season)
- Directed by: Enrique Nicanor (First season)
- Country of origin: Spain
- Original language: Spanish
- No. of seasons: 7

Production
- Producer: Alberto Espada (First season) Antonio Torets (other seasons)
- Production locations: Prado del Rey (Madrid), Spain
- Running time: 25 min.
- Production companies: Televisión Española; Children's Television Workshop

Original release
- Network: TVE 1/La Primera
- Release: 24 December 1979 – 2000

Related
- Plaza Sésamo

Barrio Sésamo ('Sesame Neighborhood') is the Spanish co-production of the American children's television series Sesame Street, produced by Televisión Española (TVE) and Children's Television Workshop (CTW) from 1979 to 2000. All characters adopted Spanish names while for the title of the series a more appropriate Spanish name was chosen: barrio (neighborhood) instead of street (calle).

== Ábrete Sésamo (1974–1978) ==
From 3 November 1974 to 29 March 1978, sketches of the original American Sesame Street were acquired by Televisión Española (TVE) and dubbed into Spanish to be aired with the title Ábrete Sésamo (es. Open Sesame) as part of its program "container" called Un globo, dos globos, tres globos.

== Barrio Sésamo (1978–1988) ==
=== Season 1 (1978–1981) ===
In 1978, TVE and Children's Television Workshop (CTW) agreed the terms for a co-production, after years where TVE simply aired the original Sesame Street dubbed segments. The new episodes included a 15 minute segment of dubbed footage, and another 15 minute segment of original footage.

Duncan Kenworthy from CTW was in charge of the American production and Enrique Nicanor was assigned by TVE as director of the Spanish segments and designer of the two Spanish new original Muppets: the hen Caponata and the snail Perezgil.

- La Gallina Caponata was a red, orange and yellow feathered hen with curly pink hair similar in height (2 metres (6 ft 7 in)) to Big Bird. Actress Emma Cohen operated and voiced the full-body Muppet. Caponata has the psychology of a six-year-old girl, naïve and curious about everything.
- Perezgil was a large green snail with round glasses and curly green hair. He was a reader, writer, poet, and advisor of everybody in the neighborhood. Actor Jesús Alcaide operated and voiced the Muppet.

Human characters includes:

- Nisi (Juan Margallo): the bar owner
- Angela (Petra Martínez), Nisi's wife
- Braulio (Manolo Aleixandre and/or José Riesgo): the newsstand owner
- Manolo (Manolo Vallejo): the garage owner
- Carmen (Conchita Goyanes)
- Cuqui (Gabriel Fariza): the radio reporter
- Jose (Marcelo Rubal)

Spanish names of the American characters:

- Bert: Blas
- Ernie: Epi
- Kermit the Frog: La rana Gustavo
- Grover: Coco
- Cookie Monster: Triqui
- Count von Count: El conde draco

==== Cancellation ====
The first Barrio Sésamo season was cancelled by TVE in 1981 when they denied the Spanish designers to keep their rights on the characters. An agreement had been reached where they granted full commercial rights to the station except the right to be mentioned as designers and the right to deny the use of the muppets for commercial advertising of carbonized drinks and unhealthy products for children, the same rights that Jim Henson kept with all his own characters. The station fired the first creators and banned the characters from appearing in a new season.

=== La cometa blanca (1981–1983) ===
From 1981 to 1983, a different TVE children's program, La cometa blanca, included some dubbed sketches from Sesame Street. This program was directed by Muppet fan Lolo Rico and featured some actors who would later appear in Barrio Sésamo, mainly Luz Olier, Alfonso Vallejo, and the child-actress Ruth Gabriel.

=== Seasons 2–4 (1983–1988) ===
The Sesame Street sketches in La cometa blanca were so successful with their young audience that Barrio Sésamo was given another chance in 1983. Only José Riesgo returned from the first season as Julián. Caponata and Perezgil were replaced by two new full-body Muppets totally designed and constructed by CTW: Espinete and Don Pimpón. Espinete was a large, pink hedgehog operated and voiced by Chelo Vivares. He became famous for sleeping in pajamas in spite of being "naked" the rest of the day. Don Pimpón was a brown monster of an unknown species who works as a farmer and has traveled all around the world, operated and voiced by Alfonso Vallejo.

Other characters included:

- Chema (Juan Sánchez): The baker of Barrio Sésamo.
- Ana (Isabel Castro): The young friend of everybody.
- Don Julián (José Riesgo): The old owner of a mobile news stand.
- Matilde (Mari Luz Olier) and Antonio (José Enrique Camacho): married owners of an horchata shop
- Roberto (Roberto Mayor) and Ruth (Ruth Gabriel, as Ruth Abellán): Matilde and Antonio's children

In 1983, one year after the second season started, a new government won the elections in Spain and José María Calviño was appointed as Director General of RTVE. The new staff fired those involved in the cancellation of the original series. The creator of the banned first season was called by the station and was appointed as new Head of the Children' Programmes Unit and later Director of the TVE-2 channel.

The show finished around April 1988 and was replaced by Los mundos de Yupi, a similar program fully produced by TVE, featuring two extraterrestrial characters.

== Barrio Sésamo (1996–2000) ==
In 1996, the show returned to TVE, this time being produced in both Catalan and Spanish in its production center in Catalonia.

New characters included Bluki (a blue full-body cat-like Muppet), Vera (a female yellow monster Muppet who speaks in the third person, similar to Elmo), Bubo (an owl Muppet), and Gaspar (a red-haired human Muppet). Additional characters that made occasional appearances included a wild monster with red fur and a healthy appetite — portraying a role similar to Cookie Monster's — and a tan Anything Muppet that could be turned into characters (such as a baby, a human girl friend of Vera's, a clumsy man with a mustache, and a pig). The show's directors were Enrique Nicanor, Antonio Torets, and Jose María Vidal (co-director).

== Later Spanish dubs ==
Since 2006, Juega conmigo, Sésamo, the Castilian Spanish dub of Play with Me Sesame, has been broadcast on Antena 3.

Since 2008, Las grandes aventuras de Epi y Blas, the Castilian Spanish dub of Bert and Ernie's Great Adventures, has been broadcast on Playhouse Disney.

Since 2012, Super Healthy Monsters is a 5 to 7-minute series focuses on activities and foods that keep one healthy. Sesame Workshop produced 26 episodes in English, which initially aired dubbed in Spain on Antena 3 as a Barrio Sésamo mini-series called Monstruos Supersanos.

On April 28, 2016, El Hotel Furchester, the Castilian Spanish dub of The Furchester Hotel, was broadcast in Spain on Clan.

The American Sesame Street is part of the HBO programming in Spain, with dubbed episodes of the HBO seasons from 2017 to present.

== Episode list ==
=== List of 1979–80s series episodes ===
- ”Programa piloto” (1979) (broadcast in 01/01/80)
- ”Primer programa” (12/24/79)
- ”Segunda programa” (1979)

The rest of the episodes are in the website RTVE but they’re titled of the date.

=== List of 1980s series episodes ===
- "La bicicleta" (6- 4-1983)
- "Vamos a jugar" (7-4-1983) (7-11-1983)
- "Dietética sana" (8-4-1983) (19-12-1983)
- "El invento de Don Pimpón" (13-4-1983) (23-11-1983)
- "Las cosquillas" (15-4-1983) (22-11-1983)
- "El cubo" (20-4-1983)(20-12-1983)
- "Fiesta de piñata" (21-4-1983)
- "Hay que divertirse" (22-4-1983) (14-11-1983)
- "La tortuga" (2-5-1983)
- "Los mayores saben jugar" (3-5-1983)(2-9-1983)
- "El plátano" (4-5-1983)(5-8-1983)
- "El cumpleaños de Teresa" (5-5-1983)
- "El juego" (6-5-1983)(9-2-1984)
- "La familia Pelaez" (9-5-1983) (30-11-1983)
- "La vaca" (10-5-1983)
- "Los cubiertos" (11-5-1983) (1-8-1983) (30-1-1984)
- "Socorro" (12-5-1983)
- "Singular persecución" (13-5-1983) (7-12-1983)
- "La familia Ortiz" (18-5-1983) (14-12-1983)
- "Los sacos" (19-5-1983) (22-2-1984)(20-5-1987)
- "La electricidad" (20-5-1983) (2-8-1983) (1-2-1984) (11-5-1987)
- "El teatro" (25-5-1983) (25-7-1983)(11-1-1984) (2-7-1987)
- "Inventando juegos" (19-7-1983)(21-12-1983)
- "La imprenta de patata" (20-7-1983)(26-12-1983)
- "Don Pimpón tiene calor" (21-7-1983)(9-1-1984)
- "Singular persecución" (22-7-1983)(4-1-1984)
- "La huerta de Julian" (27-7-1983) (18-1-1984) (7-7-1987)
- "Viendo la televisión" (28-7-1983)
- "Los gorros" (29-7-1983)
- "El extranjero" (3-8-1983)
- "La higiene del cuerpo" (4-8-1983) (6-2-1986)
- "La bolera" (18-8-1983)
- "Una tarde en casa" (30-8-1983) (22-2-1984)
- "El enfado de Espinete" (31-8-1983)
- "Los faroles" (1-9-1983)
- "La cuerda" (20-10-1983)
- "Bromas" (25-10-1983) (28-12-1983)
- "El cohete de Espinete" (1-11-1983)
- "La puerta" (2-11-1983)
- "Verdad o mentira" (3-11-1983) (12-4-1984)
- "El cuadro de Espinete" (4-11-1983) (26-4-1984)
- "Son como niños" (8-11-1983) (11-4-1984)
- "El día de la compra" (11-11-1983) (18-5-1984)
- "La máquina" (16-11-1983)
- "El mensaje secreto" (18-11-1983)
- "El encantador de serpientes" (25-11-1983)
- "Jugando al circo" (29-11-1983) (22-5-1984)
- "La caseta" (28-11-1983)
- "Espinete de La Mancha" (2-12-1983) (21-5-1984)
- "El sillin nuevo" (5-12-1983)
- "La película de Espinete" (8-12-1983) (27-4-1984)
- "Espinete tiene hipo" (12-12-1983)
- "La taquilla" (13-12-1983)
- "El muñeco mecánico" (22-12-1983) (21-5-1984)
- "Espinete y el bosque" (31-1-1984) (12-6-1984)
- "La viejecita simpática" (16-2-1984)
- "El gato" (20-2-1984)
- "Jugando con palabras" (23-2-1984) (11-6-1984)
- "El mural" (29-2-1984)
- "Personajes famosos" (1-3-1984)
- "La pelota se pincha" (5-3-1984)
- "Mi zapato" (7-3-1984)
- "Profesiones" (8-3-1984)
- "Majo, Mimo, mago" (14-3-1984) (28-6-1984) (20-7-1987)
- "El chatarrero" (15-3-1984) (26-6-1984)
- "La riña de Espinete" (19-3-1984) (8-7-1984)
- "Las bromas de Don Pimpón" (21-3-1984) (27-6-1984)
- "La cometa" (29-3-1984)
- "El sillon" (5-4-1984) (19-6-1984)
- "Conozcamos a los animales" (10-4-1984)
- "Que desbarajuste" (19-4-1984) (24-11-1987)
- "Circuitos y Espinete" (20-4-1984)
- "Qué cisco de circo" (8-6-1984)
- "Espinete y el arbol del tesoro" (1-10-1984)
- "Noche de reyes" (4-1-1985)
- "La bola" (1-7-1985)
- "Pregunta y acierta" (26-3-1986)
- "Máquina de disfraces" (7-4-1986) (19-11-1986)
- "Espinete lobo de mar" (14-4-1986) (13-11-1986) (1-2-1988)
- "El globo de Espinete" (1-5-1986) (5-4-1988)
- "La curiosidad de Espinete" (13-5-1986) (30-9-1986)
- "Concurso de disfraces" (19-6-1986) (18-12-1986) (18-2-1988)
- "Gambas con gabardina" (24-6-1896)
- "Abrete Sésamo" (25-6-1986) (18-12-1986) (14-3-1988)
- "La naranjada" (2-10-1986) (5-11-1986) (14-4-1988)
- "Espinete domador" (8-10-1986) (4-12-1986) (25-1-1988)
- "El mundo del reves y Espinete" (14-10-1986) (16-12-1986) (7-3-1988)
- "El viaje de Espinete" (3-11-1986)
- "Espinete bebé" (17-11-1986) (28-1-1988)
- "No te manches" (26-11-1986) (28-3-1988)
- "El hermano de Espinete" (9-12-1986) (11-2-1988)
- "Espinete Superstar" (19-12-1986) (30-3-1988)
- "El show de Barrio Sésamo" (1-1-1987)
- "La inauguración" (8-1-1987)
- "El guaperas" (13-1-1987)
- "El vendedor ambulante" (11-2-1987)
- "Visto y no visto" (13-2-1987)
- "Los trogloditas" (19-2-1987)
- "Llama que te llama" (23-2-1987)
- "Los trogloditas atacan de nuevo" (9-3-1987)
- "La banda y Espinete" (3-7-1987)
- "El balón de Espinete" (1-10-1987)
- "Espinete y el buzón" (5-10-1987)
- "Los trucos de Espinete" (16-11-1987)
- "El trabalenguas" (26-11-1987)
- "Vivan los novios, Espinete" (1-12-1987)
- "El tren de Espinete" (2-12-1987)
- "Las palabras" (3-12-1987)
- "Especiál navidad" (24-12-1987)
- "Especial reyes" (5-1-1988)
- "Espival de Sesamot" (6-1-1988)
- "La amiga de Espinete" (7-1-1988)
- "El hipnotizador y Espinete" (12-1-1988)
- "Los sombreros" (13-1-1988)
- "La bruja Piruja" (19-1-1988)
- "El reloj de cuco" (20-1-1988)
- "Don Pimpón y los piratas" (26-1-1988)
- "El maharaja de Kapuratala" (27-1-1988)
- "Ojo, mancha" (2-2-1988)
- "Mama Momias" (3-2-1988)
- "Espinete guardia urbano" (4-2-1988)
- "El armario de luna" (9-2-1988)
- "Gran jefe indio" (10-2-1988)
- "El doctor Herborin" (16-2-1988)
- "Espinete escayolado" (17-2-1988)
- "Camúflate Espinete" (23-2-1988)
- "Arroz para todos" (24-2-1988)
- "El mono titiritero" (25-2-1988)
- "El médico y Espinete" (2-3-1988)
- "El hombre del maletin" (3-3-1988)
- "El zoo de Espinete" (4-3-1988)
- "Espinete quiere ser camarero" (8-3-1988)
- "La máquina de los disfraces" (9-3-1988)
- "Voy a navegar" (10-3-1988)
- "Las pesas" (15-3-1988)
- "Un día tranquilo" (16-3-1988)
- "Con tenedor y cuchara" (17-3-1988)
- "El grillo" (22-3-1988)
- "Problemas con la decoración" (23-2-1988)
- "Palomitas de maíz" (24-32-1988)
- "Espinete y su grupete" (29-3-1988)
- "La visita del medico" (30-3-1988)
- "Bebe nuevo" (6-4-1988)
- "Los sonámbulos" (7-4-1988)
- "Las pintadas" (12-4-1998)
- "Misterio en el bazar" (13-4-1988)
