= Lina Morgan =

Spanish actress (1937–2015)

The Most Excellent Lina Morgan OAXS
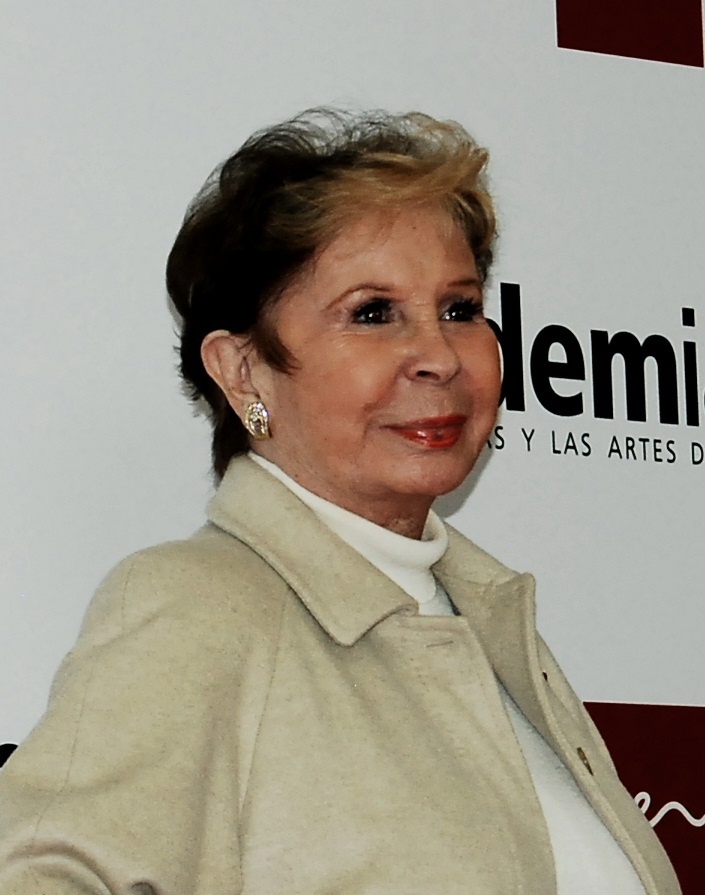
- Born: María de los Ángeles López Segovia; 20 March 1937; Madrid, Spain
- Died: 19 August 2015 (aged 78); Madrid, Spain
- Occupations: Actress, theater impresario
- Years active: 1949–2008

María de los Ángeles López Segovia OAXS (20 March 1937 – 19 August 2015), better known as Lina Morgan, was a Spanish film, theater, radio, revue and television actress and vedette. Throughout her career, she stood out for playing mostly comic roles and those related to popular genres such as the Spanish revue and musical comedy. She was also the theater impresario and owner of the Teatro La Latina in Madrid.

Morgan received many accolades throughout her career in film, stage and television spanning near six decades. She was also the recipient of many honors. The Government of Spain honored her with the Gold Medal of Merit in Labour in 1984, the Gold Medal of Merit in the Fine Arts in 1999 and with the Grand Cross of the Civil Order of Alfonso X, the Wise in 2015 posthumously.

== Biography ==
Morgan was born to Emilio López Roldán and Julia Segovia García, and was their fourth child. When she was sixteen, Morgan began working as a showgirl. She received her first major role in 1956 with the movie Mujeres or Diosas, replacing actress Mercedes Llofriu. It was during this time that she adopted her screen name of "Lina Morgan".

She was also the theater impresario of the Teatro La Latina in Madrid from 1978 to 2010, first renting the theater and since 1983 owning it.

== Filmography ==
=== Film ===
- El pobre García (1961)
- Vampiresas 1930 (1962)
- Una tal Dulcinea (1963)
- Objetivo: las estrellas (1963)
- Julieta engaña a Romeo (1965)
- La cesta (1965)
- Algunas lecciones de amor (1966)
- ¿Qué hacemos con los hijos? (1967)
- Las que tienen que servir (1967)
- Los subdesarrollados (1968)
- Unmarried and Mother in Life (1969)
- The Complete Idiot (1970)
- La graduada (1971)
- Dos chicas de revista (1972)
- La descarriada (1973) as Nati García
- La llamaban La Madrina (1973)
- Una monja y un Don Juan (1973)
- Señora doctor (1974)
- Una pareja... distinta (1974)
- Fin de semana al desnudo (1974)
- Los pecados de una chica casi decente (1975)
- Imposible para una solterona (1976)
- Ésta que lo es... (1977)
- Un día con Sergio (1977)

=== Television ===
- Sábado 64 (1965, 1 episode)
- Estudio 1 (1966, 1 episode)
- Nosotros (1968, 1 episode)
- La risa española (1969, 1 episode)
- Vaya par de gemelas (1983)
- Sí al amor (1986)
- El último tranvía (1990)
- Fin de año con Lina Morgan (1992)
- Celeste... no es un color (1993)
- Compuesta y sin novio (1994, 13 episodes)
- Hostal Royal Manzanares (1996–1998, 67 episodes)
- Una de dos (1998–1999, 19 episodes)
- Academia de baile Gloria (2001, 17 episodes)
- ¿Se puede? (2004, 11 episodes)
- El show de la 3 (2005)
- Aquí no hay quien viva (2005, 1 episode)
- A tortas con la vida (2005–2006, 7 episodes)
- Escenas de Matrimonio (2007–2008, 54 episodes)

== Accolades ==
=== Atv Awards ===
Year	Category	Work	Result	Ref.
1999	Best Acting	Hostal Royal Manzanares	Nominated	

=== Premios Ondas ===
Year	Category	Work	Result	Ref.
1998	Special Jury Award – Television	-	Won	

=== Fotogramas de Plata ===
Year	Category	Work	Result	Ref.
1987	Best Theater Actress	El último tranvía	Won	
1994	Best TV Actress	Compuesta y sin novio	Nominated	
1996	Best TV Actress	Hostal Royal Manzanares	Nominated	
1997	Best TV Actress	Hostal Royal Manzanares	Nominated	

=== TP de Oro ===
Year	Category	Work	Result	Ref.
1994	Best Actress	Compuesta y sin novio	Won	
1996	Best Actress	Hostal Royal Manzanares	Won	
1997	Best Actress	Hostal Royal Manzanares	Won	
1998	Best Actress	Una de dos	Nominated	
2001	Best Actress	Academia de baile Gloria	Nominated	

== Honours ==
- Gold Medal of Merit in Labour (Kingdom of Spain, 20 June 1984).
- Gold Medal of Merit in the Fine Arts (Kingdom of Spain, 4 December 1999).
- Dame Grand Cross of the Order of the Second of May (Community of Madrid, 2 May 2010).
- Dame Grand Cross of the Civil Order of Alfonso X, the Wise (Posthumous, Kingdom of Spain, 28 August 2015).
