= Sandokan the Great (film) =

1963 film

- Theatrical release poster
- Italian: Sandokan, la tigre di Mompracem
- Directed by: Umberto Lenzi
- Screenplay by: Fulvio Gicca; Umberto Lenzi
- Based on: Sandokan the Great by Emilio Salgari
- Produced by: Solly V. Bianco
- Starring: Steve Reeves; Geneviève Grad; Andrea Bosic; Maurice Poli
- Cinematography: Aurelio G. Larraya; Angelo Lotti; Giovanni Scarpellini
- Edited by: Jolanda Benvenuti
- Music by: Giovanni Fusco
- Production companies: Filmes; Comptoir Francais du Film; Ocean Films
- Distributed by: Metro Goldwyn Mayer
- Release dates: December 1963 (Italy); March 1964 (Madrid); December 1964 (Paris); May 1965 (United States)
- Running time: 114 minutes
- Countries: Italy; France; Spain
- Languages: Italian; English

Sandokan the Great (Italian: Sandokan, la tigre di Mompracem) is a 1963 Italian adventure film, directed by Umberto Lenzi and starring Steve Reeves. It is the first entry in a film series about Sandokan, the pirate-prince from Emilio Salgari's popular swashbuckler novels.

Reeves also starred in the sequel Pirates of Malaysia, which was also directed by Lenzi.

== Plot ==
During the reign of Queen Victoria, British forces led by Lord Hillock occupy Tapuah, subduing its population through mass executions. Among their victims are the mother and brothers of the pirate Sandokan, and in reprisal he organizes a revolutionary band. When Hillock attempts to entrap the rebel by threatening to hang his father, the Sultan of Mulaker, Sandokan penetrates Hillock's home, taking as hostage his niece, Mary Ann. Although initially indignant, Mary Ann comes to love her captor. Following an encounter with headhunters, Sandokan and his men are surrounded by Hillock's forces, and an armistice is negotiated according to which Sandokan and his gang will be exiled in return for Mary Ann's release.

Hillock immediately violates the agreement, however, imprisoning the rebels and planning for their immediate execution. Escaping, the insurgents, joined by Mary Ann, combine with the army of the native chieftain Tuang Olong to free their homeland from British domination. Hillock is allowed to leave unharmed (the officers directly responsible for the deaths of Sandokan's family members are killed in the final battle). To the horror of her uncle, Mary Ann opts to remain with Sandokan and be his bride.

== Cast ==
- Steve Reeves as Sandokan
- Geneviève Grad as Mary Ann
- Andrea Bosic as Yanez
- Rik Battaglia as Sambigliong
- Mario Valdemarin as Tenente Ross
- Leo Anchóriz as Lord Guillonk
- Antonio Molino Rojo as Tenente Toymby
- Enzo Fiermonte as Sergente Mitchell
- Nazzareno Zamperla as Hirangu

== Production ==
Giovanni Cianfriglia was the stunt double for Steve Reeves. The film's exterior scenes were filmed in Spain.

== Release ==
Sandokan the Great opened in Italy in December 1963 under the title of Sandokan, la tigre di Mompracem (Sandokan, the Tiger of Mompracem) at 115 minutes, in Madrid in March 1964 under the title of Sandokan, and later in Paris in December 1964 as Sandokan, le tigre de Bornéo (Sandokan, the Tiger of Borneo). It was released in the USA in 1965 as Sandokan the Great.

== Reception ==
In a contemporary review, the Monthly Film Bulletin reviewed a dubbed 89 minute version of the film. The review referred to the film as "sagily and fairly stodgily directed by Umberto Lenzi" with an "adequate but anonymous performance by Steve Reeves". The review concluded that the film was "fine for anyone particularly partial to children's adventure stories. The scenes in the swamp and jungle are pleasingly photographed in authentic story-book colours."
