= Order of the Second of May =

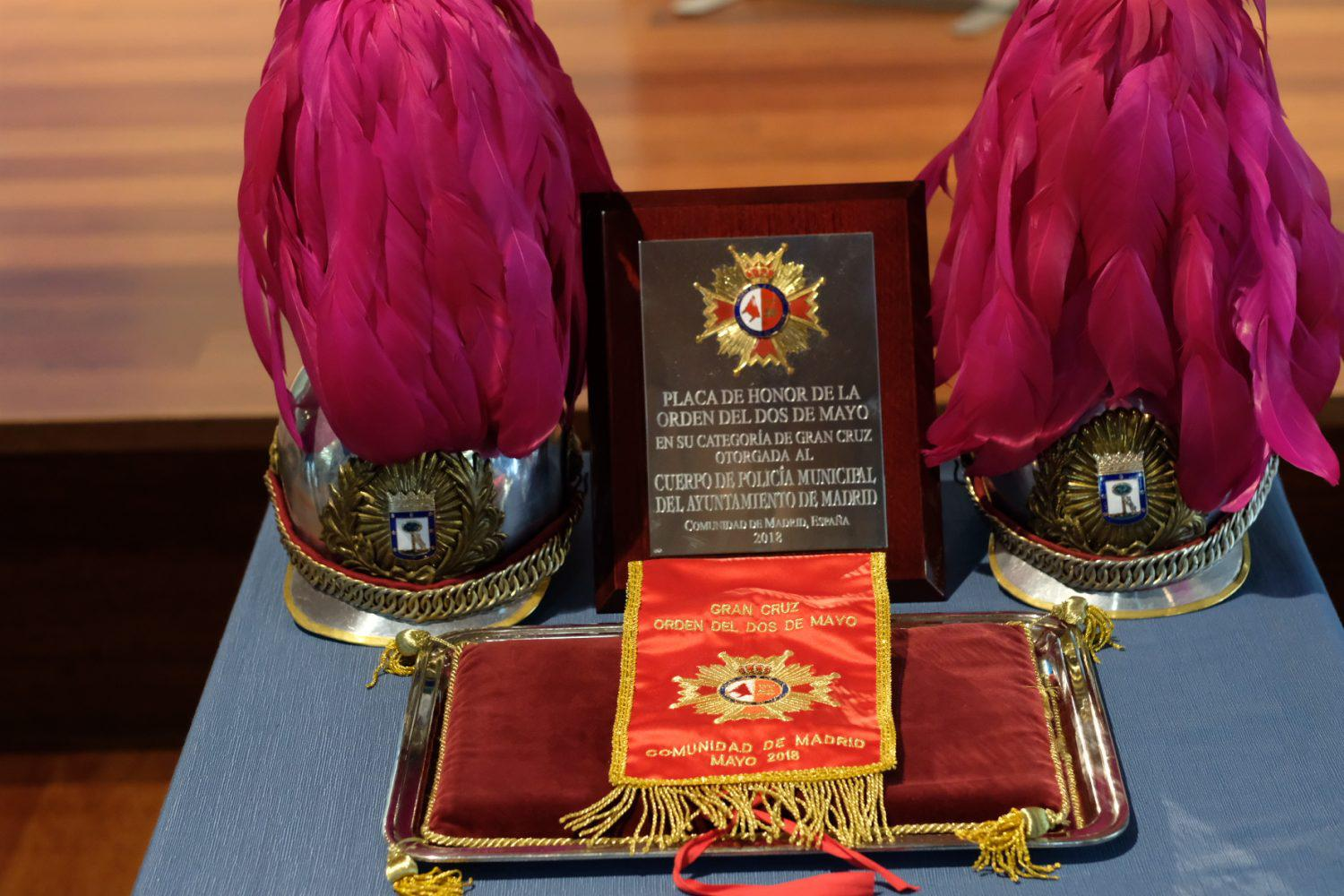
- Plaque, badge and ribbon of the order.

Awarded by President of the Community of Madrid
- Type: Madrid: Order (decoration)
- Established: 2 November 2006
- Status: Currently constituted
- Grades: Grand Cross

The Order of the Second of May (Spanish: Orden del Dos de Mayo) is one of the highest distinctions granted by the Community of Madrid, and has a single degree: Grand Cross (Gran Cruz). It was created by Decree 91/2006, of 21 November 2006, and is currently regulated in Title II of Law 2/2024, of 22 April 2024, which regulates the Honorary Distinctions of the Community of Madrid.

The Grand Cross of the Order of the Second of May is awarded to natural or legal persons, national and foreign institutions, and groups or other entities, for acts or services relevant to citizens, primarily within the Community of Madrid, and in general for their contribution to the political, economic, cultural or social progress of the region.

In the case of legal entities, the decoration takes the form of a badge of honor. Likewise, in the case of groups or other entities, it is up to the President of the Community of Madrid to decide on the form of materialization of the distinction (e.g., on some occasions personalized diplomas have been sent to those awarded).
