= Hostal Royal Manzanares =

- Genre: Sitcom
- Created by: Sebastián Junyent
- Written by: Sebastián Junyent
- Directed by: Sebastián Junyent
- Country of origin: Spain
- Original language: Spanish
- No. of seasons: 4
- No. of episodes: 61

Production
- Executive producer: Valerio Lazarov
- Production company: Prime Time for Televisión Española

Original release
- Network: La Primera
- Release: 15 February 1996 – 16 January 1998

Hostal Royal Manzanares is a Spanish prime-time television situation comedy series starring Lina Morgan, and created, written, and directed by Sebastián Junyent. It aired from 1996 to 1998 on La Primera of Televisión Española.

== Premise ==
Reme, a small-town woman, arrives to Madrid together with her father Paciano and her hen Cristal and stay at the hostel owned by Asunción, Reme's aunt.

== Cast ==
- Lina Morgan as Reme, a small-town woman who has just arrived to Madrid with her father and her hen, Cristal.
- Mary Begoña as Asunción, the owner of the guesthouse, Reme's aunt.
- Rafael Alonso as Paciano, Reme's father.
- Ana Obregón as Sonsy, a prostitute with a heart of gold.
- Joaquín Kremel as Luis, Reme's main love interest.
- Mónica Pont as Elena, Asunción's daughter and Reme's cousin.
- Tote García as Filo, the housekeeper at the guesthouse.
- Lolita Flores as Juncal, a kleptomaniac gypsy woman, who just left prison.
- Pedro Rollán as Junior, a well-off man.
- Julia Martínez as Virginia, a lodger of the guesthouse.

== Production and release ==
Produced by Valerio Lazarov's company Prime Time for Televisión Española and created, written, and directed by Sebastián Junyent, the series was filmed in presence of a studio audience. Just like some other comedy series of the time, it was based on an "inoffensive and banal" brand of humour driven by the histrionism of the characters. It premiered on 15 February 1996 on La Primera, drawing 8,491,000 viewers (a 46.01% share). The series dominated the prime time for the rest of its broadcasting run, with audience peaking on 15 May 1996 at 8,675,000 viewers and a 50.6% share. The series finale aired on 25 December 1997, yet a special episode of compilatory nature aired in January 1998.
