= Carlos Arniches =

Spanish playwright

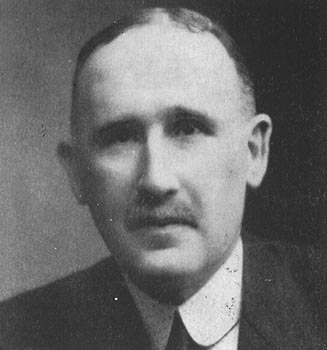
- Carlos Arniches
- Born: 11 October 1866; Alicante, Spain
- Died: 16 April 1943 (aged 76); Madrid, Spain
- Occupation: playwright

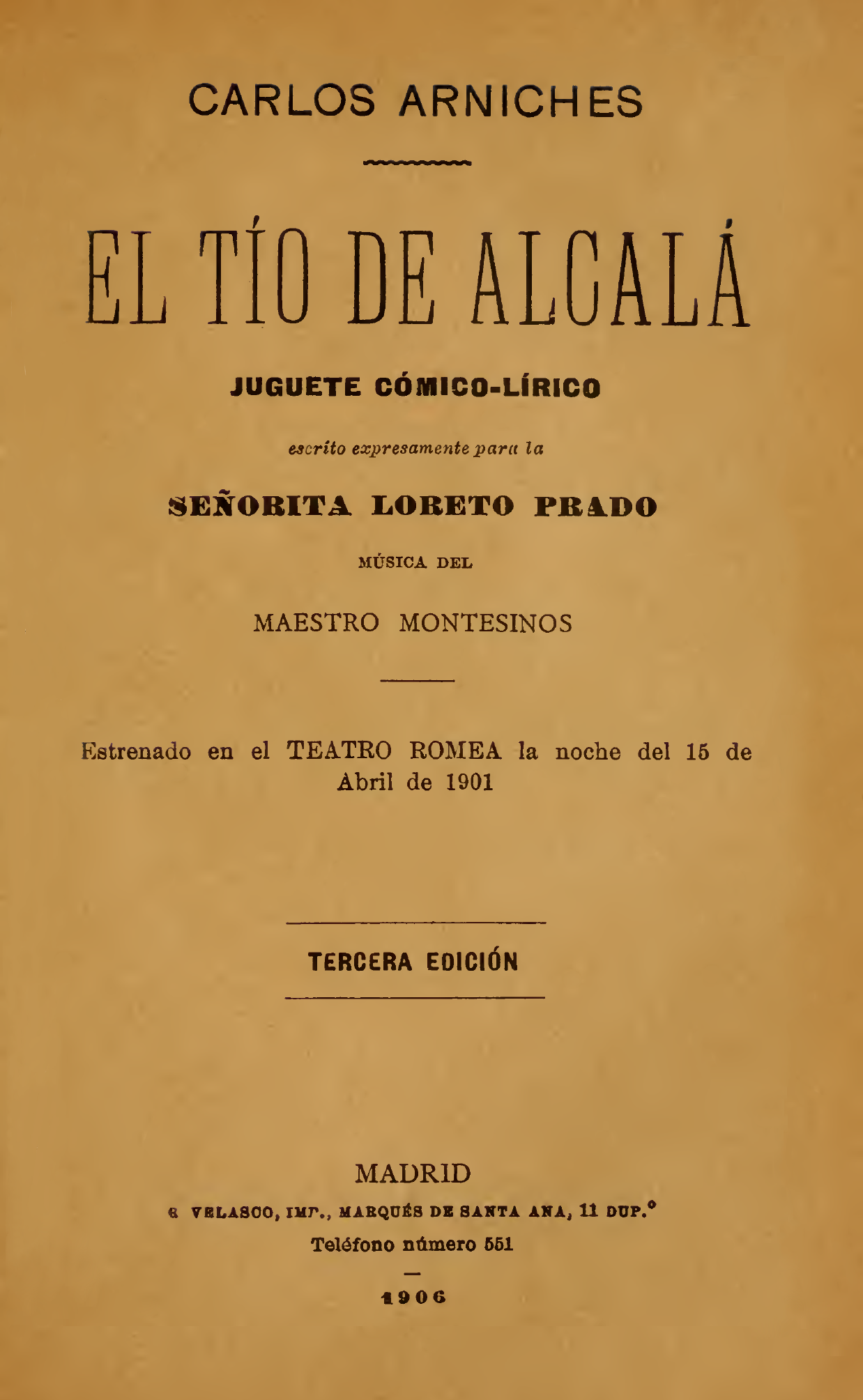
El tío de Alcalá (zarzuela, 1906).

Carlos Arniches Barreda (11 October 1866 – 16 April 1943) was a Spanish playwright, born in Alicante. His prolific work, drawing on the traditions of the género chico, the zarzuela and the grotesque, came to dominate the Spanish comic theatre in the early twentieth century.

After starting his career as a novelist and journalist, Arniches turned to theatre in 1888 with the publication of his first play, Casa editorial. Much of his work is set in lower-class Madrid and uses colloquial language, song, dance and music.

Arniches was complimented in a 1935 interview by Federico García Lorca, often a scathing critic of contemporary Spanish theatre, as 'more of a poet than almost any of those who are writing theatre in verse at the moment'.

Following the end of the Spanish Civil War, the social dramas of Carlos Arniches were among the relatively non-controversial plays allowed by the new government.
