= Enrique García Álvarez (playwright) =

Spanish playwright (1873–1931)

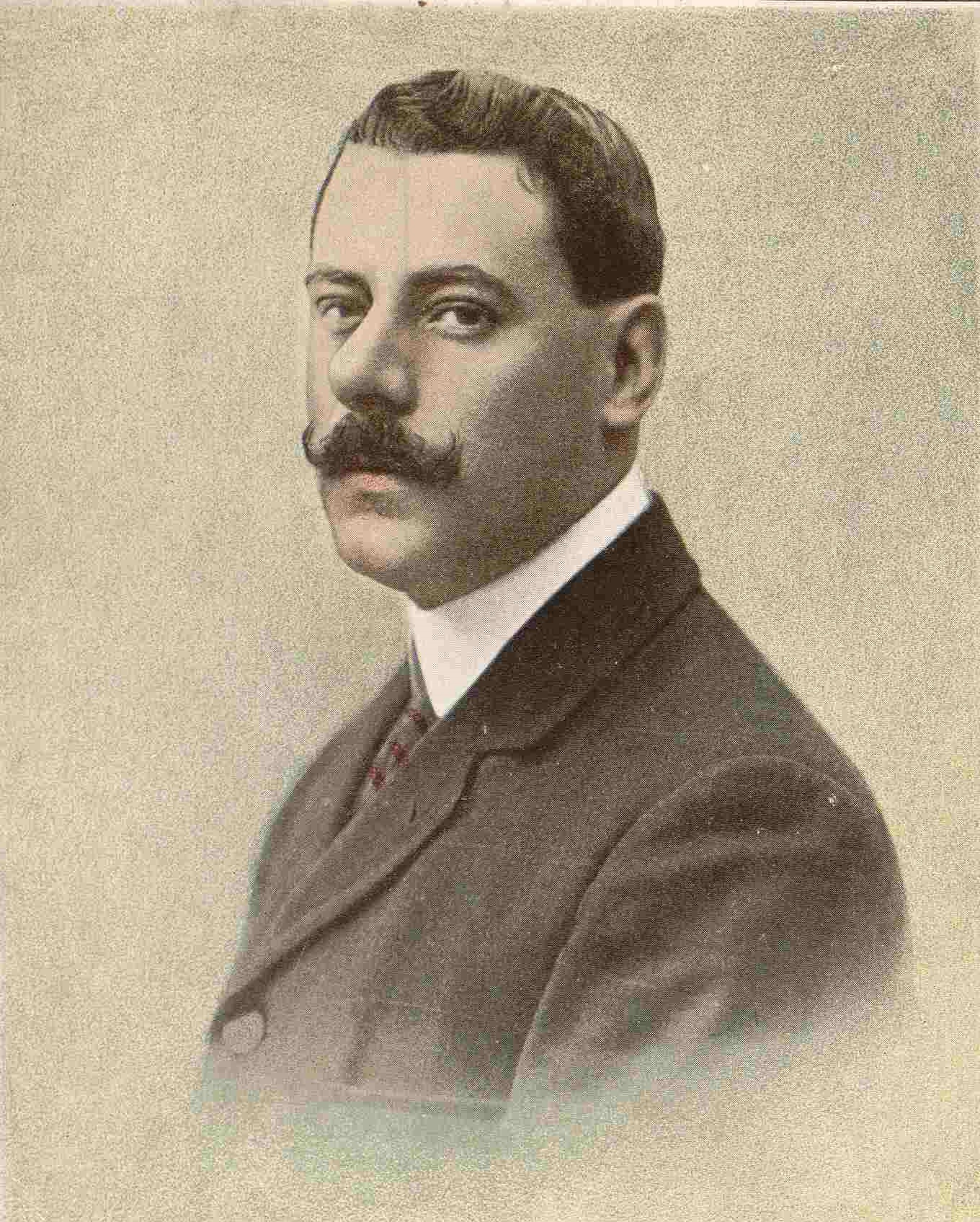

Enrique García Álvarez (1873–1931) was a Spanish playwright and composer. He wrote over 100 plays, including in collaboration with Pedro Muñoz Seca.
