= Pedro Muñoz Seca =

Spanish playwright (1879–1936)

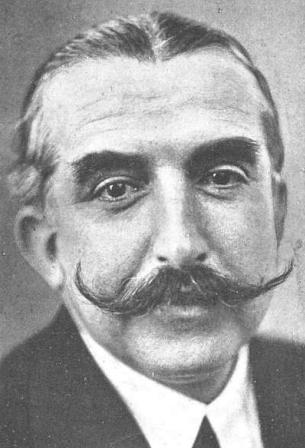
- Born: Pedro Muñoz Seca; 20 February 1879; Puerto de Santa María, Andalusia, Spain
- Died: 28 November 1936 (aged 57); Paracuellos de Jarama, Spain
- Occupations: Writer, dramatist
- Spouse: María Asunción Ariza Díez de Bunes
- Writing career
- Language: Spanish
- Genre: Astracanada

Pedro Muñoz Seca (20 February 1879 – 28 November 1936 ) was a Spanish comic playwright. He was one of the most successful playwrights of his era. He wrote approximately 300 dramatic works, both sainetes (short vignettes) and longer plays, often in collaboration with Pedro Pérez Fernández or Enrique García Álvarez. His most ambitious and best known play is La venganza de Don Mendo (Don Mendo's Revenge, 1918); other major works include La barba de Carrillo (Carrillo's Beard, 1918) and Pepe Conde (1920).

== Early life and career ==
Muñoz Seca was born into a large family in El Puerto de Santa María, Cádiz, Spain, on 20 February 1879. (Because Muñoz Seca loved palindromic numbers, however, he often claimed that he was born in 1881. He also claimed to have been born at 10:15 pm, "the normal time for shows to start".) Muñoz Seca attended primary school at the Jesuit school of San Luis Gonzaga in El Puerto de Santa María. He then moved to Seville to study philosophy and law; he graduated in 1901. While Muñoz Seca was still a student, his first plays premiered in El Puerto de Santa María (República estudiantil, Un Perfecto de pasivas, and El señor de Pilili) and in Seville (Las Guerreras).

After his graduation, Muñoz Seca moved to Madrid. There, he taught Latin, Greek, and Hebrew and later would work as a lawyer. He often attended literary society meetings, and there met Sebastian Alonso. The two collaborated on the play El Contrabando, which premiered in 1904. Muñoz Seca entered public service in 1908, taking a post in the Ministry of Public Works and Transport. Soon thereafter, he married María Asunción Ariza Díez de Bulnes; they would have nine children.

== Career as playwright and execution ==
His work often employed "slang, puns, plays on words, caricature, parody, and dramatic tricks". He was the inventor of a new genre of comic theatre, the astracanada, the most celebrated example of which is La venganza de Don Mendo, a satire of the romances popular in Spain at the turn of the century.

Muñoz Seca's popularity grew after the premiere of La venganza de Don Mendo. Many of his later plays were very successful, including La pluma verde (1922), Los chatos (1924), La tela (1925), and Los extremeños se tocan (1927) (all written in collaboration with Pedro Pérez Fernández, but who contributed little to the works). These works shifted away from costumbrismo toward Muñoz Seca's trademark astracanada.

After the establishment of the Second Spanish Republic in 1931, Muñoz Seca was at the height of his career, though his dramatic output slowed. Major works during this period include La voz de su amo (1933), Anacleto se divorcia (1932), La EME (1934), and La plasmatoria (1935). Muñoz Seca was a royalist and friend of Alfonso XIII, and his plays La oca (1931) and Jabalí (1932) sharply criticized the Second Republic. In July 1936, after the outbreak of the Spanish Civil War, he was arrested in Barcelona; he was later transported to Madrid. A humorist to the end, he said to his court-martial, "You can take my hacienda, my land, my wealth, even—as you are going to do—my life. But there is one thing that you cannot take from me—the fear that I have!" (Note: "¡Podéis quitarme la hacienda, mis tierras, mi riqueza, incluso podéis quitarme, como vais a hacer, la vida, pero hay una cosa que no me podéis quitar, y es el miedo que tengo!" Other versions of the quote have also been reported. This phrase is often called his last words, but it was reported several weeks before his death.) On 28 November 1936 he was executed by a Spanish Republican Army firing squad in the Paracuellos massacre. His final words, addressed to the firing squad, were "I am starting to believe you are not intending to count me among your friends!"

== Legacy ==
The Pedro Muñoz Seca Municipal Theater in El Puerto de Santa María and the Muñoz Seca Theater in Madrid are named in Muñoz Seca's honor.

In 1995, the Pedro Muñoz Seca Foundation (Fundación Pedro Muñoz Seca) was established; it is sponsored by descendants of the author and by the government of El Puerto de Santa Maria. The foundation maintains a small museum devoted to the author in his former family home in El Puerto de Santa Maria.

Muñoz Seca is the grandfather of Spanish writer and journalist Alfonso Ussía.

== Dramatic works ==
- República estudiantil
- El espanto de Toledo
- La novela de Rosario
- Las inyecciones
- ¡Usted es Ortiz!
- Calamar
- El alfiler
- ¡Pégame, Luciano!
- Satanelo
- ¡Un! ¡Dos! ¡Tres!... ¡La niña para usted!
- ¡Todo para ti!
- El drama de Adán
- Una que no sirve
- Equilibrios
- ¡Te quiero, Pepe!
- Bronca en el ocho
- El refugio
- Los quince millones
- La Eme
- El gran ciudadano
- El rey negro
- ¡¡Cataplum!!
- ¡Sola!
- Las cuatro paredes
- El verdugo de Sevilla
- La venganza de Don Mendo
- Los extremeños se tocan
- La Oca
- Anacleto se divorcia
- El último pecado
- La razón de la locura
- ¡Por peteneras!
- La canción húngara
- Coba Fina
- Las cosas de la vida
- El medio ambiente
- La Nicotina
- Trampa y cartón
- El milagro del santo
- López de Coria
- El incendio de Roma
- Cachivache
- Naide es ná
- La perla ambarina
- Lolita Tenorio
- El marido de la Engracia
- Albi-Melén
- El voto de Santiago
- El teniente alcalde de Zalamea
- De rodillas a tus pies
- La fórmula 3k3
- Los rifeños
- Un drama de Calderón
- Trianerías
- Las verónicas
- La Tiziana
- El mal rato
- Los amigos del alma
- Pepe Conde o el mentir de las estrellas
- Martinglas
- El clima de Pamplona
- San Pérez
- El parque de Sevilla
- La hora del reparto
- Tirios y troyanos
- El número 15
- De lo vivo a lo pintado
- ¡Plancha!
- El Goya
- La pluma verde
- El rey nuevo
- La mujer de nieve
- Los chatos
- Bartolo tiene una flauta
- La tela
- Los campanilleros
- El sonámbulo
- La cabalgata de los Reyes
- María Fernández
- Seguidilla gitana
- El voto
- La caraba
- La mala uva
- La Lola
- El rajáh de Cochin
- Ali-Gui
- ¡Un millón!
- El sofá, la radio, el peque y la hija de Palomeque
- ¿Qué tienes en la mirada?
- Los ilustres gañanes
- El cuatrigémino
- La perulera
- Una mujer decidida
- El alma de corcho
- Mi padre
- El corzo
- ¡No hay no!
- Jabalí
- Trastos viejos
- La voz de su amo
- El Ex...
- Mi chica
- El escándalo
- ¡Soy un sinvergüenza!
- Papeles
- Marcelino fue por vino
- La plasmatoria
- Zape
- Las guerreras
- El contrabando
- De balcón en balcón
- Las tres cosas de Jérez
- El lagar
- El jilguerillo de los parrales
- La neurastenia de Satanás
- La cucaña de Solarillo
- Fúcar XXI
- Pastor y Borrego
- La niña de las planchas
- La frescura de Lafuente
- La casa de los crímenes
- La Remolino
- El castillo de los ultrajes
- La escala de Milán
- La conferencia de Algeciras
- El último Bravo
- Los cuatro Robinsones
- La mujer
- El rayo
- Poca cosa es un hombre
- La cura
- El clamor
- La Academia
- La tonta del rizo
- Las cuatro paredes (posthumous, premiered in 1940)

== Works cited ==
- Alejo Fernández, Francisco; Caballero Oliver, Juan Diego (2003). Cultura andaluza: geografía, historia, arte, literatura, música y cultura popular (in Spanish). MAD-Eduforma. ISBN 978-84-665-2913-6.
- Azcune, Valentín (2007). Biblioteca Teatral (in Spanish). CSIC. ISBN 978-84-00-08548-3.
- Chandler, Richard Eugène; Schwartz, Kessel (1991). A new history of Spanish literature. LSU Press. ISBN 978-0-8071-1735-4.
- Gómez García, Manuel (1998). Diccionario del teatro (in Spanish). Ediciones Akal. ISBN 978-84-460-0827-9.
- Gonzalez-López, Emilio (1980). "Muñoz Seca, Pedro". In Bédé, Jean Albert; Edgerton, William Benbow (eds.). Columbia dictionary of modern European literature. Entry revised by Harold L. Boudreau. Columbia University Press. ISBN 978-0-231-03717-4.
- Mainer, José-Carlos (2010). Historia de la literatura española (in Spanish). Editorial Critica. ISBN 978-84-9892-068-0.
- Mir Serra, Miquel; Santamaría, Mariano (2011). La otra memoria histórica (in Spanish). Ediciones Nowtilus. ISBN 978-84-9967-253-3.
- Pascual Martínez, Pedro (1994). Escritores y editores en la Restauración canovista, 1875-1923 (in Spanish). Ediciones de la Torre. ISBN 978-84-7960-101-0.
