= List of pirate films and television series =

This is a list of pirate films and TV series, primarily in the pirate film genre, about the Golden Age of Piracy from the 17th through 18th centuries. The list includes films about other periods of piracy, TV series, and films tangentially related, such as pirate-themed pornographic films. Films about other types of piracy, such as music piracy, are not included.

== Films ==
=== 1900s ===
| Released | Title | Country | Director | Notable cast | Notes |
|---|---|---|---|---|---|
| 1908 | The Story of Treasure Island | United States | J. Stuart Blackton | | Short film based on Treasure Island |
| 1908 | L'Honneur du corsaire | France | Victorin-Hippolyte Jasset | Charles Krauss | Short film |
| 1908 | The Pirate's Gold | United States | D. W. Griffith | George Gebhardt, Linda Arvidson, Charles Inslee | Short Film |
| 1909 | Morgan le pirate | France | Victorin-Hippolyte Jasset | Jean-Marie de l'Isle | Serial (3 parts) |

=== 1910s ===
| Released | Title | Country | Director | Notable cast | Notes |
|---|---|---|---|---|---|
| 1911 | Blackbeard | United States | Francis Boggs | Sydney Ayres, Hobart Bosworth | Short film about Blackbeard (c. 1680 – 1718) |
| 1912 | Treasure Island | United States | J. Searle Dawley | Addison Rothermel, Ben F. Wilson, Charles Ogle | Short film based on Treasure Island |
| 1913 | Pirate Gold | United States | Wilfred Lucas | Blanche Sweet, Charles Hill Mailes, J. Jiquel Lanoe | Short Film |
| 1915 | The Footsteps of Capt. Kidd | United States | Rex Beach, Edward A. Salisbury | | Documentary |
| 1915 | On the Spanish Main | United States | Rex Beach, Edward A. Salisbury | | Documentary |
| 1915 | Pirate Haunts | United States | Rex Beach, Edward A. Salisbury | | Documentary |
| 1915 | A Submarine Pirate | United States | Charles Avery, Sydney Chaplin | Sydney Chaplin, Wesley Ruggles | Short film featuring submarine piracy |
| 1916 | Colonel Heeza Liar and the Pirates | United States | John Randolph Bray | | Animated comedy short film |
| 1916 | Daphne and the Pirate | United States | Christy Cabanne | Lillian Gish, Elliott Dexter, Walter Long | |
| 1918 | The Sea Panther | United States | Thomas N. Heffron | William Desmond, Mary Warren, Jack Richardson | |
| 1918 | Treasure Island | United States | Chester M. Franklin, Sidney Franklin | Francis Carpenter, Virginia Lee Corbin, Violet Radcliffe | Based on Treasure Island |
| 1919 | Störtebeker | Germany | Ernst Wendt | Bruno Decarli | Film about Klaus Störtebeker (c. 1360 – 1401), set in the North Sea and Baltic Sea |

=== 1920s ===
| Released | Title | Country | Director | Notable cast | Notes |
|---|---|---|---|---|---|
| 1920 | Jolanda, la figlia del Corsaro Nero | Italy | Vitale De Stefano | Anita Faraboni | Based on Yolanda, the Black Corsair's Daughter |
| 1920 | Pirate Gold | United States | George B. Seitz | Marguerite Courtot, George B. Seitz, Frank Redman | Film serial |
| 1920 | Treasure Island | United States | Maurice Tourneur | Shirley Mason, Josie Melville, Al W. Filson | Based on Treasure Island |
| 1921 | The Black Corsair | Italy | Vitale De Stefano | Rodolfo Badaloni | Based on The Black Corsair |
| 1921 | Cold Steel | United States | Sherwood MacDonald | J. P. McGowan, Kathleen Clifford, Stanhope Wheatcroft | |
| 1921 | Il figlio del corsaro rosso | Italy | Vitale De Stefano | | Based on Son of the Red Corsair |
| 1921 | La regina dei Caraibi | Italy | Vitale De Stefano | La Bella Argentina, Rodolfo Badaloni | Based on The Queen of the Caribbean |
| 1921 | Gli ultimi filibustieri | Italy | Vitale Di Stefano | Riccardo Tassani | Based on the sequel novels of The Black Corsair |
| 1922 | Captain Kidd | United States | Burton L. King, J. P. McGowan | Eddie Polo, Kathleen Myers, Leslie Casey | Film serial |
| 1922 | Le Fils du Flibustier | France | Louis Feuillade | Aimé Simon-Girard | Film serial |
| 1922 | Masters of the Sea | Austria | Alexander Korda | Victor Varconi | |
| 1924 | The Buccaneers | | Mark Goldaine, Robert F. McGowan | Joe Cobb, Jackie Condon, Mickey Daniels | |
| 1924 | Captain Blood | United States | David Smith | J. Warren Kerrigan, Jean Paige, Charlotte Merriam | Based on Captain Blood |
| 1924 | Peter Pan | United States | Herbert Brenon | Betty Bronson, Ernest Torrence, George Ali | Based on Peter and Wendy |
| 1924 | The Sea Hawk | United States | Frank Lloyd | Milton Sills, Enid Bennett | Based on The Sea Hawk, set in the Elizabethan era in the Mediterranean Sea |
| 1925 | Clothes Make the Pirate | United States | Maurice Tourneur | Leon Errol, Dorothy Gish, Nita Naldi | Comedy |
| 1925 | Peter the Pirate | Germany | Arthur Robison | Paul Richter, Aud Egede Nissen, Rudolf Klein-Rogge | Set in the Mediterranean Sea |
| 1925 | Satan's Sister | United Kingdom | George Pearson | Betty Balfour | |
| 1925 | Surcouf | France | Luitz-Morat | Jean Angelo | Film serial about Robert Surcouf (1773 – 1827), set in the Napoleonic Wars |
| 1926 | The Black Pirate | United States | Albert Parker | Douglas Fairbanks, Billie Dove, Anders Randolf | Also known as The Black Buccaneer |
| 1926 | Breed of the Sea | United States | Ralph Ince | Ralph Ince, Margaret Livingston, Pat Harmon | |
| 1926 | The Eagle of the Sea | United States | Frank Lloyd | Florence Vidor, Ricardo Cortez | Film about Jean Lafitte (c. 1780 – c. 1823) |
| 1926 | Old Ironsides | United States | James Cruze | Charles Farrell, Esther Ralston, Wallace Beery | Also known as Sons of the Sea. Set in the Mediterranean Sea, in the early 19th century. |
| 1927 | The Road to Romance | United States | John S. Robertson | Ramon Novarro, Marceline Day, Marc McDermott | Based on Romance |
| 1928 | The Beautiful Corsair | Italy | Wladimiro De Liguoro | Rina De Liguoro | |
| 1928 | The First Kiss | United States | Rowland V. Lee | Fay Wray, Gary Cooper, Lane Chandler | |
| 1928 | Modern Pirates | Germany | Manfred Noa | Jack Trevor | |
| 1929 | The Delightful Rogue | United States | Leslie Pearce | Rod La Rocque | |
| 1929 | The Pirate of Panama | United States | Ray Taylor | Jay Wilsey, Natalie Kingston, Al Ferguson | Film serial |

=== 1930s ===
| Released | Title | Country | Director | Notable cast | Notes |
|---|---|---|---|---|---|
| 1930 | Hell Harbor | United States | Henry King | Lupe Vélez, Jean Hersholt, John Holland | |
| 1931 | Corsair | United States | Roland West | Chester Morris | |
| 1934 | Pirate Treasure | United States | Ray Taylor | Richard Talmadge, Lucille Lund, Walter Miller | Film serial |
| 1934 | Treasure Island | United States | Victor Fleming | Wallace Beery, Jackie Cooper, Lionel Barrymore | Based on Treasure Island |
| 1935 | Captain Blood | United States | Michael Curtiz | Errol Flynn, Olivia de Havilland, Basil Rathbone, Lionel Atwill | Based on Captain Blood |
| 1935 | China Seas | United States | Tay Garnett | Clark Gable, Jean Harlow, Wallace Beery | |
| 1935 | Naughty Marietta | United States | Robert Z. Leonard, W. S. Van Dyke | Jeanette MacDonald, Nelson Eddy | Musical |
| 1935 | Pirate Party on Catalina Isle | | | Charles 'Buddy' Rogers, Sterling Young, The Fanchonettes | Pirate-themed variety show held of Catalina Isle starring a number of Hollywood comics. |
| 1936 | Captain Calamity | United States | John Reinhardt | Marian Nixon, George Houston, Vince Barnett | |
| 1936 | Dancing Pirate | United States | Lloyd Corrigan | Charles Collins, Frank Morgan, Steffi Duna | Musical comedy. Set in the 1820s. |
| 1937 | The Black Corsair | Italy | Amleto Palermi | Ciro Verratti, Silvana Jachino | Based on The Black Corsair |
| 1937 | Doctor Syn | United Kingdom | Roy William Neill | George Arliss, Margaret Lockwood, John Loder | Film about smugglers in England in the late 18th century. Based on Doctor Syn: A Tale of the Romney Marsh. |
| 1938 | The Buccaneer | United States | Cecil B. DeMille | Fredric March, Franciska Gaal, Akim Tamiroff | Film about Jean Lafitte (c. 1780 – c. 1823) |
| 1938 | Spawn of the North | United States | Henry Hathaway | George Raft, Henry Fonda, Dorothy Lamour | Set in the coast of Alaska |
| 1939 | Jamaica Inn | United Kingdom | Alfred Hitchcock | Charles Laughton, Maureen O'Hara, Robert Newton | Set in England in 1819. Based on Jamaica Inn |

=== 1940s ===
| Released | Title | Country | Director | Notable cast | Notes |
|---|---|---|---|---|---|
| 1940 | The Daughter of the Green Pirate | Italy | Enrico Guazzoni | Doris Duranti, Fosco Giachetti | Based on the sequel novels of The Black Corsair |
| 1940 | The Sea Hawk | United States | Michael Curtiz | Errol Flynn, Brenda Marshall, Claude Rains | Set in the Elizabethan era, but unlike the novel The Sea Hawk it is set in the Caribbean Sea |
| 1942 | The Black Swan | United States | Henry King | Tyrone Power, Maureen O'Hara, Laird Cregar | Film about Henry Morgan (c. 1635 – 1688) |
| 1942 | Reap the Wild Wind | United States | Cecil B. DeMille | Ray Milland, John Wayne, Paulette Goddard | Set in the 1840s along the Florida coast |
| 1943 | Gli ultimi filibustieri | Italy | Marco Elter | Vittorio Sanipoli | Based on the sequel novels of The Black Corsair |
| 1943 | The Son of the Red Corsair | Italy | Marco Elter | Vittorio Sanipoli | Based on Son of the Red Corsair |
| 1944 | El Corsario Negro | Mexico | Chano Urueta | Pedro Armendáriz, María Luisa Zea, June Marlowe | Based on The Black Corsair |
| 1944 | Frenchman's Creek | United States | Mitchell Leisen | Joan Fontaine, Arturo de Córdova, Basil Rathbone | Based on Frenchman's Creek |
| 1944 | The Princess and the Pirate | United States | David Butler | Bob Hope, Virginia Mayo, Walter Brennan, Victor McLaglen, Walter Slezak | Comedy |
| 1945 | Captain Kidd | United States | Rowland V. Lee | Charles Laughton, Randolph Scott, Barbara Britton | Film about Captain William Kidd (1654 – 1701) |
| 1945 | Manhunt of Mystery Island | United States | Spencer Gordon Bennet, Yakima Canutt, Wallace Grissell | Richard Bailey, Linda Stirling | Film serial |
| 1945 | The Spanish Main | United States | Frank Borzage | Paul Henreid, Maureen O'Hara, Walter Slezak | |
| 1947 | The Sea Hound | United States | W. B. Eason, Mack V. Wright | Buster Crabbe, Jimmy Lloyd (actor), Pamela Blake | Film serial |
| 1947 | Sinbad the Sailor | United States | Richard Wallace | Douglas Fairbanks Jr., Maureen O'Hara, Walter Slezak, Anthony Quinn | Set at the time of Caliph Harun al-Rashid (ruled from 786 to 809), in the Indian Ocean. |
| 1948 | Buccaneer Bunny | United States | Friz Freleng | Mel Blanc (voice) | Animated comedy short film |
| 1948 | The Pirate | United States | Vincente Minnelli | Judy Garland, Gene Kelly, Walter Slezak | Musical |
| 1949 | Barbary Pirate | United States | Lew Landers | Donald Woods, Trudy Marshall | Film about the begin of the First Barbary War. Set in 1801 |
| 1949 | Rosvo-Roope (Raunchy Ropey) | Finland | Hannu Leminen | Tauno Palo, Helena Kara, Ghedi Lönnberg | |

=== 1950s ===
| Released | Title | Country | Director | Notable cast | Notes |
|---|---|---|---|---|---|
| 1950 | Buccaneer's Girl | United States | Frederick de Cordova | Yvonne De Carlo, Philip Friend, Robert Douglas | Set around 1810 |
| 1950 | Double Crossbones | United States | Charles Barton | Donald O'Connor, Helena Carter, Will Geer | Comedy |
| 1950 | Fortunes of Captain Blood | United States | Gordon Douglas | Louis Hayward, Patricia Medina, George Macready | Based on Captain Blood |
| 1950 | Last of the Buccaneers | United States | Lew Landers | Paul Henreid, Jack Oakie, Karin Booth | Film about Jean Lafitte (c. 1780 – c. 1823) |
| 1950 | Pirates of the High Seas | United States | Spencer Gordon Bennet, Thomas Carr | Buster Crabbe, Lois Hall, Tommy Farrell | Film serial |
| 1950 | Treasure Island | United States United Kingdom | Byron Haskin | Robert Newton, Bobby Driscoll, Basil Sydney | Based on Treasure Island |
| 1950 | Two Lost Worlds | United States | Norman Dawn | James Arness, Kasey Rogers, Bill Kennedy | Set in the year 1830 |
| 1951 | Anne of the Indies | United States | Jacques Tourneur | Jean Peters, Louis Jourdan, Debra Paget | With Blackbeard (c. 1680 – 1718) |
| 1951 | Captain Horatio Hornblower R.N. | United Kingdom | Raoul Walsh | Gregory Peck, Virginia Mayo, Robert Beatty | Based on the Horatio Hornblower novels. Set in the Napoleonic Wars |
| 1951 | Flame of Araby | United States | Charles Lamont | Maureen O'Hara, Jeff Chandler, Lon Chaney Jr., Buddy Baer | Film about the Brothers Barbarossa (Oruç Reis, c. 1474 – 1518, and Hayreddin Barbarossa, c. 1478 – 1546) |
| 1951 | Hurricane Island | United States | Lew Landers | Jon Hall, Marie Windsor, Romo Vincent | Set in Florida in the year 1513 |
| 1951 | Revenge of the Pirates | Italy | Primo Zeglio | Jean-Pierre Aumont, Maria Montez | |
| 1952 | Abbott and Costello Meet Captain Kidd | United States | Charles Lamont | Bud Abbott, Lou Costello, Charles Laughton | Comedy |
| 1952 | Against All Flags | United States | George Sherman | Errol Flynn, Maureen O'Hara, Anthony Quinn | Set in Madagascar |
| 1952 | Blackbeard the Pirate | United States | Raoul Walsh | Robert Newton, Linda Darnell, William Bendix | Film about Blackbeard (c. 1680 – 1718) |
| 1952 | Captain Pirate | United States | Ralph Murphy | Louis Hayward, Patricia Medina, John Sutton | Based on Captain Blood. Also known as Captain Blood, Fugitive. Sequel to Fortunes of Captain Blood (1950). |
| 1952 | Caribbean Gold | United States | Edward Ludwig | John Payne, Arlene Dahl, Cedric Hardwicke | Set in 1728 |
| 1952 | The Crimson Pirate | United States | Robert Siodmak | Burt Lancaster, Nick Cravat, Eva Bartok | |
| 1952 | The Golden Hawk | United States | Sidney Salkow | Sterling Hayden, Rhonda Fleming, Helena Carter | |
| 1952 | Jolanda, the Daughter of the Black Corsair | Italy | Mario Soldati | May Britt, Marc Lawrence, Renato Salvatori | Based on Yolanda, the Black Corsair's Daughter |
| 1952 | I tre corsari | Italy | Mario Soldati | Ettore Manni, Marc Lawrence, Renato Salvatori, Cesare Danova | Based on The Black Corsair |
| 1952 | Yankee Buccaneer | United States | Frederick de Cordova | Jeff Chandler, Scott Brady, Suzan Ball | Film about David Porter (1780 – 1843) |
| 1953 | Fair Wind to Java | United States | Joseph Kane | Fred MacMurray, Vera Ralston, Robert Douglas | Set in 1883 |
| 1953 | The Great Adventures of Captain Kidd | United States | Derwin Abrahams, Charles S. Gould | Richard Crane, David Bruce, John Crawford | Film serial about Captain William Kidd (1654 – 1701) |
| 1953 | The Master of Ballantrae | United Kingdom | William Keighley | Errol Flynn, Roger Livesey, Anthony Steel, Beatrice Campbell, Yvonne Furneaux | Set after 1745, based on The Master of Ballantrae |
| 1953 | Peter Pan | United States | Clyde Geronimi, Wilfred Jackson, Hamilton Luske | Bobby Driscoll, Kathryn Beaumont, Hans Conried (voices) | Animated film based on Peter and Wendy |
| 1953 | Prince of Pirates | United States | Sidney Salkow | John Derek, Barbara Rush, Carla Balenda | Set in the 16th century in the Netherlands |
| 1953 | Raiders of the Seven Seas | United States | Sidney Salkow | John Payne, Donna Reed, Gerald Mohr | Film about Barbarossa (Oruç Reis, c. 1474 – 1518) |
| 1954 | Alvaro piuttosto corsaro | | Camillo Mastrocinque | Renato Rascel | Musical |
| 1954 | The Black Pirates | United States Mexico El Salvador | Allen H. Miner | Anthony Dexter, Martha Roth, and Lon Chaney Jr. | |
| 1954 | Captain Hareblower | United States | Friz Freleng | Mel Blanc (voice) | Animated comedy short film |
| 1954 | Captain Kidd and the Slave Girl | United States | Lew Landers | Anthony Dexter, Eva Gabor, Alan Hale Jr. | |
| 1954 | His Majesty O'Keefe | United States | Byron Haskin | Burt Lancaster | Film about David O'Keefe (1824 – 1901) and Bully Hayes (1827 – 1877) |
| 1954 | Long John Silver | United States | Byron Haskin | Robert Newton, Connie Gilchrist, Lloyd Berrell | Also known as Long John Silver's Return to Treasure Island; Sequel to Treasure Island |
| 1954 | Return to Treasure Island | United States | Ewald André Dupont | Tab Hunter, Dawn Addams, Porter Hall | Sequel to Treasure Island |
| 1955 | Moonfleet | United States | Fritz Lang | Stewart Granger, George Sanders, Joan Greenwood | Film about smugglers in England in the 18th century |
| 1955 | Pirates of Tripoli | United States | Felix E. Feist | Paul Henreid, Patricia Medina, Paul Newlan | Set in the Mediterranean Sea |
| 1956 | Davy Crockett and the River Pirates | United States | Norman Foster | Fess Parker, Buddy Ebsen, Jeff York | Film about Davy Crockett (1786 – 1836), set on the Mississippi River |
| 1957 | Pirate of the Half Moon | Italy | Giuseppe Maria Scotese | John Derek, Gianna Maria Canale, Ingeborg Schöner | Set in the 16th century in the Mediterranean Sea |
| 1958 | The Amorous Corporal | France | Robert Darène | François Périer, Rossana Podestà, Robert Hirsch | Set in Madagascar |
| 1958 | The Buccaneer | United States | Anthony Quinn | Yul Brynner, Claire Bloom, Charles Boyer, Charlton Heston | Film about Jean Lafitte (c. 1780 – c. 1823) |
| 1958 | The Fabulous World of Jules Verne | Czechoslovakia | Karel Zeman | Lubor Tokoš, Arnost Navrátil, Miroslav Holub | Fantasy and science fiction film based on Facing the Flag by Jules Verne |
| 1958 | Pirate of the Black Hawk | Italy France | Sergio Grieco | Gérard Landry, Mijanou Bardot | Set in the 16th century in the Mediterranean Sea |
| 1959 | The Little Savage | United States | Byron Haskin | Pedro Armendáriz | |
| 1959 | Marie of the Isles | France Italy | Georges Combret | Belinda Lee, Alain Saury, Magali Noël, Folco Lulli | Set in 1635 |
| 1959 | The Pirate and the Slave Girl | Italy | Piero Pierotti | Lex Barker, Chelo Alonso, Massimo Serato, Graziella Granata | Set in the 16th century in the Mediterranean Sea |
| 1959 | Son of the Red Corsair | Italy | Primo Zeglio | Lex Barker | Based on Son of the Red Corsair |

=== 1960s ===
| Released | Title | Country | Director | Notable cast | Notes |
|---|---|---|---|---|---|
| 1960 | The Boy and the Pirates | United States | Bert I. Gordon | Charles Herbert, Susan Gordon, Murvyn Vye | Fantasy film with Blackbeard (c. 1680 – 1718) |
| 1960 | Morgan, the Pirate | Italy France | André de Toth, Primo Zeglio | Steve Reeves, Valérie Lagrange, Ivo Garrani | Film about Henry Morgan (c. 1635 – 1688) |
| 1960 | Pirates of the Coast | Italy | Domenico Paolella | Lex Barker | |
| 1960 | Queen of the Pirates | Italy | Mario Costa | Gianna Maria Canale, Massimo Serato, Scilla Gabel | Set in the 16th century in the Mediterranean Sea |
| 1960 | Robin Hood and the Pirates | Italy | Giorgio Simonelli | Lex Barker, Walter Barnes | Set in England in the 12th century |
| 1960 | Swiss Family Robinson | United States | Ken Annakin | John Mills, Dorothy McGuire, James MacArthur | Set in the early 19th century, based on The Swiss Family Robinson |
| 1961 | Il conquistatore di Maracaibo | | Eugenio Martín | Hans von Borsody, Luisella Boni | |
| 1961 | Fury at Smugglers' Bay | United Kingdom | John Gilling | Peter Cushing, Bernard Lee, Michèle Mercier, John Fraser | Set in England in the 1790s. |
| 1961 | Guns of the Black Witch | Italy France | Domenico Paolella | Don Megowan, Silvana Pampanini | |
| 1961 | Jules Verne's Mysterious Island | United States United Kingdom | Cy Endfield | Michael Craig, Joan Greenwood, Michael Callan, Herbert Lom | Based on The Mysterious Island, set in 1865 |
| 1961 | Pirates of Tortuga | United States | Robert D. Webb | Ken Scott, Letícia Román, Dave King | |
| 1961 | Queen of the Seas | Italy France | Umberto Lenzi | Lisa Gastoni, Jerome Courtland, Walter Barnes | Also known as The Adventure of Mary Read; Film about Mary Read (c. 1690 – 1721) |
| 1961 | Rage of the Buccaneers | Italy | Mario Costa | Ricardo Montalbán, Vincent Price, Giulia Rubini | |
| 1961 | The Secret of the Black Falcon | Italy | Domenico Paolella | Lex Barker, Walter Barnes | |
| 1962 | Avenger of the Seven Seas | Italy France | Domenico Paolella | Richard Harrison, Michèle Mercier, Walter Barnes | Set in 1790 |
| 1962 | Hawk of the Caribbean | Italy | Piero Regnoli | Johnny Desmond, Yvonne Monlaur | |
| 1962 | Hero's Island | United States | Leslie Stevens | James Mason, Neville Brand, Kate Manx | Set in 1718 at the Outer Banks of North Carolina |
| 1962 | Julius Caesar Against the Pirates | Italy | Sergio Grieco | Gustavo Rojo, Abbe Lane, Gordon Mitchell | An adventure of the young Julius Caesar, based on a true story. Set in the Mediterranean Sea in the years 75 BC and 74 BC. |
| 1962 | Musketeers of the Sea | Italy | Steno | Pier Angeli, Channing Pollock, Aldo Ray, Philippe Clay, Robert Alda | |
| 1962 | The Pirates of Blood River | United Kingdom | John Gilling | Kerwin Mathews, Glenn Corbett, Christopher Lee | |
| 1962 | Seven Seas to Calais | Italy | Rudolph Maté, Primo Zeglio | Rod Taylor, Keith Michell, Edy Vessel | Film about Francis Drake |
| 1962 | The Son of Captain Blood | Italy | Tulio Demicheli | Sean Flynn, Alessandra Panaro, John Kitzmiller | Based on Captain Blood |
| 1962 | Tiger of the Seven Seas | Italy | Luigi Capuano | Gianna Maria Canale, Anthony Steel, John Kitzmiller | |
| 1963 | The Lion of St. Mark | Italy | Luigi Capuano | Gordon Scott, Gianna Maria Canale, Alberto Farnese | Set in the 1620 in the Mediterranean Sea |
| 1963 | Samson and the Sea Beast | Italy | Tanio Boccia | Kirk Morris, Margaret Lee | |
| 1964 | Captain Clegg | United Kingdom | Peter Graham Scott | Peter Cushing, Yvonne Romain, Patrick Allen | Also known as Night Creatures. Film about smugglers in England in the late 18th century. Based on Doctor Syn: A Tale of the Romney Marsh. |
| 1964 | The Devil-Ship Pirates | United Kingdom | Don Sharp | Christopher Lee, Andrew Keir, John Cairney | Set in England in 1588 |
| 1964 | Hercules and the Black Pirates | Italy | Luigi Capuano | Alan Steel, Rosalba Neri | |
| 1964 | The Masked Man Against the Pirates | Italy | Vertunnio De Angelis | George Hilton, Tony Kendall | |
| 1964 | The Pirates of Malaysia | Italy; France; Spain | Umberto Lenzi | Steve Reeves, Andrea Bosic, Jacqueline Sassard | Set in the 19th century in Malaysia |
| 1964 | Toto vs. the Black Pirate | Italy | Fernando Cerchio | Totò, Mario Petri | Comedy |
| 1964 | Treasure Island | China | Hsin-yan Chang, Qi Fu | Tseng Chang, Sisi Chen, Qi Fu | |
| 1965 | The Adventurer of Tortuga | Italy | Luigi Capuano | Guy Madison, Ingeborg Schöner, Rik Battaglia | |
| 1965 | Giant of the Evil Island | Italy | Piero Pierotti | Peter Lupus, Halina Zalewska | |
| 1965 | A High Wind in Jamaica | United Kingdom | Alexander Mackendrick | Anthony Quinn, James Coburn, Dennis Price | Set in 1870 |
| 1966 | Assault on a Queen | United States | Jack Donohue | Frank Sinatra, Virna Lisi, Alf Kjellin | Submarine piracy |
| 1966 | The Sea Pirate | Italy | Sergio Bergonzelli, Roy Rowland | Gérard Barray, Antonella Lualdi | Film about Robert Surcouf (1773 – 1827), set in the Napoleonic Wars |
| 1966 | Tonnerre sur l'océan Indien | | Sergio Bergonzelli, Roy Rowland | Gérard Barray, Antonella Lualdi | Film about Robert Surcouf (1773 – 1827), set in the Napoleonic Wars |
| 1967 | The King's Pirate | United States | Don Weis | Doug McClure, Jill St. John, Guy Stockwell | |
| 1967 | The Rover | Italy | Terence Young | Anthony Quinn, Rosanna Schiaffino, Rita Hayworth | Based on The Rover, set in France in the Napoleonic Wars |
| 1968 | Blackbeard's Ghost | United States | Robert Stevenson | Peter Ustinov, Dean Jones, Suzanne Pleshette | Fantasy comedy |
| 1969 | Franco, Ciccio e il pirata Barbanera | Italy | Mario Amendola | Franco and Ciccio, Fernando Sancho | Comedy |

=== 1970s ===
| Released | Title | Country | Director | Notable cast | Notes |
|---|---|---|---|---|---|
| 1970 | Il corsaro | | Antonio Mollica | Robert Woods | |
| 1970 | Pippi in the South Seas | Sweden West Germany | Olle Hellbom | Inger Nilsson | Comedy, based on Pippi in the South Seas |
| 1971 | Blackie the Pirate | Italy | Enzo Gicca | Terence Hill, George Martin, Bud Spencer | |
| 1971 | Los corsarios | | Ferdinando Baldi | Dean Reed, Alberto de Mendoza, Annabella Incontrera | |
| 1971 | The Light at the Edge of the World | United States Spain | Kevin Billington | Kirk Douglas, Yul Brynner, Samantha Eggar | Set at Cape Horn in the year 1865. Based on The Lighthouse at the End of the World |
| 1972 | Un pirata de doce años | | René Cardona Jr. | Hugo Stiglitz, René Cardona III, Christa Linder | |
| 1972 | Pirates of Blood Island | | José Luis Merino | Carlos Quiney, Stelvio Rosi | |
| 1972 | Treasure Island | United States | Hal Sutherland | Richard Dawson, Davy Jones, Dal McKennon (voices) | Animated film based on Treasure Island |
| 1972 | Treasure Island | United Kingdom France West Germany Italy Spain | John Hough | Orson Welles, Kim Burfield, Lionel Stander | Based on Treasure Island |
| 1973 | Ghost in the Noonday Sun | United Kingdom | Peter Medak | Peter Sellers | Comedy |
| 1973 | Scalawag | United Kingdom | Kirk Douglas | Kirk Douglas | Set in California in the 19th century |
| 1974 | Les Démoniaques | France | Jean Rollin | Joëlle Cœur, Lieva Lone, Patricia Hermenier, John Rico, Willy Braque | Horror. Set at the end of the 19th century, on the north European coast. |
| 1974 | The Ghost Galleon | Spain | Amando de Ossorio | Maria Perschy, Jack Taylor | Horror film |
| 1975 | The Valiant Ones | Taiwan Hong Kong | King Hu | Pai Ying, Hsu Feng, Roy Chiao | Martial arts film |
| 1976 | The Black Corsair | | Sergio Sollima | Kabir Bedi, Carole André, Mel Ferrer | Based on The Black Corsair |
| 1976 | Noroît | France | Jacques Rivette | Geraldine Chaplin, Bernadette Lafont, Kika Markham | Avant-garde and experimental film |
| 1976 | Swashbuckler | United States | James Goldstone | Robert Shaw, James Earl Jones, Peter Boyle, Geneviève Bujold | Also known as Scarlet Buccaneer |
| 1977 | Oro rojo | Spain Mexico | Alberto Vázquez Figueroa | José Sacristán, Isela Vega, Hugo Stiglitz | |
| 1977 | Golden Rendezvous | South Africa | Ashley Lazarus | Richard Harris, Ann Turkel, Gordon Jackson | |

=== 1980s ===
| Released | Title | Country | Director | Notable cast | Notes |
|---|---|---|---|---|---|
| 1980 | The Island | United States | Michael Ritchie | Michael Caine, David Warner, Angela Punch McGregor | |
| 1981 | Los Diablos del mar | | Juan Piquer Simón | Ian Sera, Patty Shepard, Frank Braña | |
| 1982 | The Pirate Movie | Australia | Ken Annakin | Kristy McNichol, Christopher Atkins, Ted Hamilton | Musical |
| 1983 | Nate and Hayes | New Zealand United States | Ferdinand Fairfax | Tommy Lee Jones, Michael O'Keefe, Jenny Seagrove | Film about Bully Hayes (1827 – 1877) |
| 1983 | The Pirates of Penzance | United Kingdom United States | Wilford Leach | Kevin Kline, Angela Lansbury, Linda Ronstadt | Musical |
| 1983 | Space Raiders | United States | Howard R. Cohen | Vince Edwards, David Mendenhall | Science fiction |
| 1983 | Yellowbeard | United States | Mel Damski | Graham Chapman, Peter Boyle | Comedy |
| 1983 | Project A | Hong Kong | Jackie Chan | Jackie Chan, Sammo Hung, Yuen Biao | Action comedy |
| 1984 | The Ice Pirates | United States | Stewart Raffill | Robert Urich, Mary Crosby, Michael D. Roberts | Science fiction |
| 1984 | The Master of Ballantrae | United States United Kingdom | Douglas Hickox | Michael York, Timothy Dalton, John Gielgud | Television film set after 1745, based on The Master of Ballantrae |
| 1985 | The Goonies | United States | Richard Donner | Sean Astin, Josh Brolin and Jeff Cohen, Corey Feldman | |
| 1985 | The Lightship | United States | Jerzy Skolimowski | Robert Duvall, Arliss Howard, Klaus Maria Brandauer | |
| 1985 | The Pirates of Penzance | | Norman Campbell | Brent Carver, Jeff Hyslop, Caralyn Tomlin | Television film musical |
| 1985 | Treasure Island | United Kingdom France United States | Raúl Ruiz | Melvil Poupaud, Martin Landau, Vic Tayback | Based on Treasure Island |
| 1986 | Castle in the Sky | Japan | Hayao Miyazaki | | Animated science fiction film |
| 1986 | Pirates | France Tunisia Poland | Roman Polanski | Walter Matthau, Cris Campion, Damien Thomas | |
| 1987 | Jim & Piraterna Blom | Sweden | Hans Alfredson | Johan Åkerblom, Ewa Fröling, Jan Malmsjö | |
| 1987 | The Princess Bride | United States | Rob Reiner | Cary Elwes, Mandy Patinkin, Robin Wright, André the Giant | |
| 1987 | Project A Part II | Hong Kong | Jackie Chan | Jackie Chan, Maggie Cheung, Rosamund Kwan, Bill Tung | Action comedy |
| 1988 | Deep Rising | United States | Stephen Sommers | Treat Williams, Famke Janssen, Anthony Heald | |
| 1988 | Iguana | Italy | Monte Hellman | Everett McGill, Fabio Testi, Michael Madsen | Set in the 19th century on a remote island of the Galápagos Islands |
| 1988 | Act of Piracy | United States | John Cardos | Gary Busey, Belinda Bauer, Ray Sharkey | |

=== 1990s ===
| Released | Title | Country | Director | Notable cast | Notes |
|---|---|---|---|---|---|
| 1990 | Shipwrecked | Norway United States | Nils Gaup | Stian Smestad, Gabriel Byrne, Louisa Milwood-Haigh | |
| 1990 | Treasure Island | United Kingdom United States | Fraser Clarke Heston | Charlton Heston, Christian Bale, Oliver Reed, Christopher Lee | Television film based on Treasure Island |
| 1990 | Voyage of Terror: The Achille Lauro Affair | United States Germany Italy France | Alberto Negrin | Burt Lancaster, Eva Marie Saint, Robert Culp, Renzo Montagnani, Rebecca Schaeffer | Television film |
| 1990 | Pirate Prince | | Alan Horrox | Sean Blowers, Danny Cerqueira, Mona Hammond | Television film |
| 1990 | Pirate's Island | Australia | Viktors Ritelis | Beth Buchanan, Brian Rooney, Sancho Gracia | Television film |
| 1991 | Matusalem | Canada | Roger Cantin | Marc Labrèche, Jessica Barker, Maxime Collin | |
| 1991 | Hook | United States | Steven Spielberg | Dustin Hoffman, Robin Williams, Julia Roberts | Based on Peter and Wendy |
| 1992 | Under Siege | United States | Andrew Davis | Steven Seagal, Tommy Lee Jones, Gary Busey | |
| 1994 | Treasure Island: The Adventure Begins | | Scott Garen | Anthony Zerbe, Corey Carrier, Jason Beghe | Television film based on Treasure Island |
| 1995 | Cutthroat Island | United States France | Renny Harlin | Geena Davis, Matthew Modine, Frank Langella | |
| 1995 | Magic Island | United States | Sam Irvin | Zachery Ty Bryan, Andrew Divoff, Edward Kerr | |
| 1995 | Waterworld | United States | Kevin Reynolds | Kevin Costner, Dennis Hopper | Science fiction |
| 1996 | Muppet Treasure Island | United States | Brian Henson | Tim Curry, Kevin Bishop, Billy Connolly | Comedy, based on Treasure Island |
| 1998 | Doraemon: Nobita's Great Adventure in the South Seas | Japan | Tsutomu Shibayama | | Animated film based on Doraemon anime |
| 1998 | Matusalem II | | Roger Cantin | Manuel Aranguiz, Jean-Pierre Bergeron, Pierre-Luc Brillant | |
| 1998 | Six Days, Seven Nights | United States | Ivan Reitman | Harrison Ford, Anne Heche, David Schwimmer, Temuera Morrison | |
| 1999 | Pirates of the Plain | United States | John R. Cherry III | Tim Curry, Seth Adkins, Dee Wallace, Charles Napier | Fantasy comedy |
| 1999 | I predatori delle Antille | Italy | Joe D'Amato | Anita Skultéty | |
| 1999 | Treasure Island | United States | Peter Rowe | Jack Palance | Based on Treasure Island |
| 1999 | Final Voyage | United States | Jim Wynorski | Dylan Walsh, Ice-T, Erika Eleniak, Claudia Christian | |

=== 2000s ===
| Released | Title | Country | Director | Notable cast | Notes |
|---|---|---|---|---|---|
| 2000 | One Piece: The Movie | Japan | Junji Shimizu | Mayumi Tanaka, Kazuya Nakai, Akemi Okamura, Kappei Yamaguchi | Based on One Piece and its anime adaptation |
| 2000 | The Island of the Crab | Spain | Txavi Basterretxea, Joxan Muñoz | | Animated musical film |
| 2000 | Agent Red | United States | Damian Lee | Dolph Lundgren, Alexander Kuznetov, Natalie Radford | Submarine piracy |
| 2001 | The Sea Wolf | United States/United Kingdom/Italy/Cuba | Mark Roper | Thomas Ian Griffith, Gerit Kling | Also released as SeaWolf: The Pirate's Curse |
| 2001 | The Abrafaxe – Under The Black Flag | Germany | Gerhard Hahn | David Turba, Nena, Helmut Krauss, Santiago Ziesmer | Animated fantasy film with Blackbeard (c. 1680 – 1718) |
| 2002 | Treasure Planet | United States | Ron Clements, John Musker | Joseph Gordon-Levitt, Emma Thompson, Martin Short (voices) | Animated science fiction film, based on Treasure Island |
| 2003 | Captain Sabertooth | Norway | Stig Bergqvist, Rasmus A. Sivertsen | Terje Formoe, Ole Alfsen, Nina Lund Feste (voices) | Comedy |
| 2003 | One Piece The Movie: Dead End no Bōken | Japan | Kōnosuke Uda | | Based on One Piece and its anime adaptation |
| 2003 | Peter Pan | United States | P. J. Hogan | Jeremy Sumpter, Jason Isaacs, Olivia Williams | Based on Peter and Wendy |
| 2003 | Pirates of the Caribbean: The Curse of the Black Pearl | United States | Gore Verbinski | Johnny Depp, Geoffrey Rush, Orlando Bloom, Keira Knightley | |
| 2003 | Sinbad: Legend of the Seven Seas | United States | Tim Johnson, Patrick Gilmore | | Animated comedy film. Set in the Mediterranean Sea |
| 2003 | Singing Behind Screens | | Ermanno Olmi | Jun Ichikawa, Bud Spencer | Film about Ching Shih (1775–1844) |
| 2004 | One Piece: The Cursed Holy Sword | Japan | Kazuhisa Takenouchi | | Based on One Piece and its anime adaptation |
| 2005 | Submerged | United States | Anthony Hickox | Steven Seagal, William Hope, Vinnie Jones | Submarine piracy |
| 2005 | Pirates | United States | Joone | Jesse Jane, Carmen Luvana, Janine, Teagan Presley, Devon, Jenaveve Jolie and Evan Stone | Pornographic film |
| 2005 | Jolly Roger: Massacre at Cutter's Cove | United States | Gary Jones | Rhett Giles, Tom Nagel, Kristina Korn | Slasher film about a vengeful undead pirate. Set in modern times. |
| 2006 | Pirates of Treasure Island | United States | Leigh Scott | Lance Henriksen | Based on Treasure Island |
| 2006 | Pirates of the Caribbean: Dead Man's Chest | United States | Gore Verbinski | Johnny Depp, Orlando Bloom, Keira Knightley | |
| 2006 | Pirates of the Great Salt Lake | United States | E. R. Nelson | Kirby Heyborne, Trenton James, Larry Bagby | |
| 2006 | A Pirate's Heart | | Miguel Alexandre | Ken Duken, Claire Keim, Gottfried John, Gudrun Landgrebe, Frank Giering | Television film about Klaus Störtebeker (c. 1360 – 1401), set in the North Sea and Baltic Sea |
| 2007 | L'Île aux trésors | France | Alain Berbérian | Gérard Jugnot, Alice Taglioni, Jean-Paul Rouve | Based on Treasure Island |
| 2007 | One Piece Movie: The Desert Princess and the Pirates: Adventures in Alabasta | Japan | Takahiro Imamura | | Based on One Piece and its anime adaptation |
| 2007 | Pirates of the Caribbean: At World's End | United States | Gore Verbinski | Johnny Depp, Orlando Bloom, Keira Knightley, Chow Yun-Fat, Geoffrey Rush | |
| 2007 | Treasure Island | Germany | Hansjörg Thurn | Tobias Moretti, François Goeske, Diane Willems, Christian Tramitz, Jürgen Vogel | A German television film, Die Schatzinsel, based on the novel by R.L. Stevenson, it adds a character, Captain Flint's daughter |
| 2008 | Pirates II: Stagnetti's Revenge | United States | Joone | Jesse Jane, Belladonna, Evan Stone | Pornographic film |
| 2008 | The Pirates Who Don't Do Anything: A VeggieTales Movie | United States | Mike Nawrocki | | Animated comedy film |
| 2009 | 12 Paces Without a Head | Germany | Sven Taddicken | Ronald Zehrfeld, Matthias Schweighöfer | Film about Klaus Störtebeker (c. 1360 – 1401), set in the North Sea and Baltic Sea |
| 2009 | One Piece Film: Strong World | Japan | Munehisa Sakai | | Based on One Piece and its anime adaptation |

=== 2010s ===
| Released | Title | Country | Director | Notable cast | Notes |
|---|---|---|---|---|---|
| 2011 | The Pirate Tapes | Canada | Andrew Moniz, Rock Baijnauth | | Documentary film |
| 2011 | Pirates of the Caribbean: On Stranger Tides | United States | Rob Marshall | Johnny Depp, Penélope Cruz, Ian McShane, Geoffrey Rush | |
| 2012 | A Hijacking | Denmark | Tobias Lindholm | Pilou Asbæk, Søren Malling, Dar Salim | |
| 2012 | One Piece Film: Z | Japan | Tatsuya Nagamine | | Based on One Piece and its anime adaptation |
| 2012 | The Pirates! In an Adventure with Scientists! | United Kingdom United States | Peter Lord | Hugh Grant, Salma Hayek, Jeremy Piven (voices) | Animated comedy film. Based on The Pirates! In an Adventure with Scientists |
| 2012 | Ice Age: Continental Drift | United States | Steve Martino and Michael Thurmeier | Ray Romano, John Leguizamo, Denis Leary, Drake, Nicki Minaj, Jennifer Lopez, Queen Latifah, Peter Dinklage | Animated film |
| 2013 | Captain Phillips | United States | Paul Greengrass | Tom Hanks, Barkhad Abdi | |
| 2014 | Bodacious Space Pirates: Abyss of Hyperspace | Japan | | | Anime film based on the Bodacious Space Pirates light novel and its anime adaptation |
| 2014 | Captain Sabertooth and the Treasure of Lama Rama | Norway | John Andreas Andersen, Lisa Marie Gamlem | Kyrre Haugen Sydness | Captain Sabertooth series |
| 2014 | The Pirate Fairy | United States | Peggy Holmes | Mae Whitman, Christina Hendricks, Tom Hiddleston (voices) | Animated film based on Peter and Wendy |
| 2015 | Pirate's Passage | Canada | Mike Barth, Jamie Gallant | Donald Sutherland, Gage Munroe, Carrie-Anne Moss | Animated film |
| 2015 | The SpongeBob Movie: Sponge Out of Water | United States | Paul Tibbitt; Mike Mitchell | Antonio Banderas | Live-action/animated film based on SpongeBob SquarePants television series |
| 2015 | Pan | United States | Joe Wright | Hugh Jackman, Levi Miller, Garrett Hedlund, Rooney Mara, Amanda Seyfried | Based on Peter and Wendy |
| 2016 | One Piece Film: Gold | Japan | Hiroaki Miyamoto | | Based on One Piece and its anime adaptation |
| 2017 | Pirates of the Caribbean: Dead Men Tell No Tales | United States | Joachim Rønning and Espen Sandberg | Johnny Depp, Geoffrey Rush, Javier Bardem | |
| 2018 | Doraemon: Nobita's Treasure Island | Japan | Kazuaki Imai | | Based on Doraemon anime, and on Treasure Island |
| 2018 | Aquaman | United States | James Wan | Jason Momoa, Amber Heard, Willem Dafoe | Submarine piracy |
| 2018 | Thugs of Hindostan | India | Vijay Krishna Acharya | Aamir Khan, Fatima Sana Shaikh, Amitabh Bachchan | Set in 1795, the film follows a band of Thugs led by Khudabaksh Azaad, who aspires to free Hindostan (the Indian subcontinent) from the rule of the expanding British East India Company. |
| 2019 | Captain Sabertooth and the Magic Diamond | Norway | Marit Moum Aune, Rasmus A. Sivertsen | | Animated film based on the Captain Sabertooth series |

=== 2020s ===
| Released | Title | Country | Director | Notable cast | Notes |
|---|---|---|---|---|---|
| 2022 | One Piece Film: Red | Japan | Gorō Taniguchi | | Based on One Piece and its anime adaptation |
| 2022 | Shotgun Wedding | United States | Jason Moore | Jennifer Lopez, Josh Duhamel | |
| 2023 | Peter Pan & Wendy | United States | David Lowery | Jude Law, Jim Gaffigan | Based on Peter Pan and Wendy |
| 2025 | Captain Sabertooth and the Countess of Grail | Norway | Are Austnes, Yaprak Morali, Rasmus A. Sivertsen | | Animated film based on the Captain Sabertooth series |
| 2025 | The Treasure of Barracuda | Spain | Adrià García | | Animated film based on the book of the same name |
| 2027 | One Piece Film: God Valley | Japan | | | Based on One Piece and its anime adaptation |
| 2029 | One Piece Film: BAAD | Japan | | | Based on One Piece and its anime adaptation |

== Television series ==
| Released | Title | Country | Director | Notable cast | Notes |
|---|---|---|---|---|---|
| 1954 | The Adventures of Long John Silver | Australia | Byron Haskin | Robert Newton, Connie Gilchrist, Kit Taylor | Television series based on Treasure Island |
| 1956 | The Buccaneers | United Kingdom | C.M. Pennington-Richards | Robert Shaw, Paul Hansard, Brian Rawlinson | |
| 1986 | Return to Treasure Island | United Kingdom | Alan Clayton | Brian Blessed, Christopher Guard, Reiner Schöne | Television miniseries based on Treasure Island |
| 1987 | Treasure Island in Outer Space | Italy | Antonio Margheriti | Anthony Quinn, Ernest Borgnine, Klaus Löwitsch | Science fiction miniseries, based on Treasure Island |
| 1990 | Peter Pan & the Pirates | United States | | Tim Curry, Kath Soucie, Chris M. Allport (voices) | Animated series based on Peter and Wendy |
| 1991 | The Pirates of Dark Water | United States | | Jodi Benson, Héctor Elizondo, George Newbern (voices) | Animated television series |
| 1994 | Pirates | United Kingdom | Peter Tabern | Mem Ferda, Benjamin Rennis, June Brown | Children's television series |
| 1996 | Return to Treasure Island | | Steve La Hood | Jed Brophy, Will Clannachan, Richard Condon | Based on Treasure Island |
| 1997 | Captain Butler | United Kingdom | | | |
| 1997 | Captain Red Beard | France | | | Animated television series |
| 1997 | Pirate Tales | United States | Kevin McCarey | Chuck Shamata, Roger Daltrey, Richard Schumann | Television miniseries |
| 1998 | Mad Jack the Pirate | United States | | | Animated television series |
| 1999 | Caraibi | Italy | Lamberto Bava | Paolo Seganti, Nicholas Rogers, Mario Adorf, Padma Lakshmi, Jennifer Nitsch | Television miniseries also known as Pirates: Blood Brothers |
| 1999 | One Piece | Japan | | | Anime adaptation of the manga One Piece |
| 1999 | Famille Pirate | France; Germany; Canada | | | Animated television series |
| 2003 | Pirate Islands | Australian | | Brooke Harman, Nicholas Donaldson, Eliza Taylor | |
| 2006 | Blackbeard | United States | Kevin Connor | Angus Macfadyen, Richard Chamberlain, Rachel Ward, Stacy Keach | TV miniseries about Blackbeard (c. 1680 – 1718) |
| 2006 | Blackbeard: Terror at Sea | United Kingdom | Richard Dale, Tilman Remme | James Purefoy | TV miniseries about Blackbeard (c. 1680 – 1718) |
| 2007 | The Lost Treasure of Fiji | Australia | | | Spin-off of Pirate Islands series |
| 2011 | Jake and the Never Land Pirates | United States | | | Animated television series |
| 2011 | Piratas | Spain | | | |
| 2012 | Treasure Island | United Kingdom; Ireland | Steve Barron | Eddie Izzard, Toby Regbo, Elijah Wood, Donald Sutherland | Television miniseries based on Treasure Island |
| 2012 | Bodacious Space Pirates | Japan | | | Anime adaptation of the light novel Bodacious Space Pirates |
| 2014 | Black Sails | United States | Jonathan E. Steinberg and Robert Levine | Toby Stephens, Hannah New, Luke Arnold | Set roughly two decades before the events of Treasure Island and during the Golden Age of Piracy. |
| 2014 | Crossbones | United States | Neil Cross, James V. Hart and Amanda Welles | John Malkovich, Richard Coyle, Claire Foy, Yasmine Al Masri, David Hoflin, Chris Perfetti, Tracy Ifeachor | Based on Colin Woodard's book The Republic of Pirates. |
| 2017 | The Pirates Next Door | France | | | Animated television series |
| 2020 | Santiago of the Seas | United States | | | Animated television series |
| 2021 | The Lost Pirate Kingdom | United States | Stan Griffin, Justin Rickett, Patrick Dickinson | Sam Callis, James Oliver Wheatley, Derek Jacobi | Netflix docuseries portraying the rise and fall of the 18th century pirate republic based in Nassau, Bahamas. |
| 2021 | Fena: Pirate Princess | Japan | | | Animated television series |
| 2022 | Our Flag Means Death | United States | David Jenkins | Rhys Darby, Taika Waititi, Kristian Nairn, Rory Kinnear | Period comedy semi-based on the story of Stede Bonnet, an aristocrat who abandons his life to become a pirate. |
| 2023 | One Piece | United States; Japan | | | Live-action adaptation of the manga One Piece |
| 2024 | Lootere | India | Jai Mehta | Vivek Gomber, Rajat Kapoor, Amruta Khanvilkar, Martial Batchamen Tchana | Television series based on Somalian pirates |
| 2026 | Treasure Island | United Kingdom; United States | Jeremy Lovering, William McGregor, Paul Walker | Tom Sweet, David Oyelowo, Hayley Atwell | Television series based on Treasure Island |
| 2027 | The One Piece | Japan | | | Anime adaptation of the manga One Piece |

== Pirate film series ==
| Title | Number of films | Years | Notes |
|---|---|---|---|
| Captain Sabertooth | 8 | 1994–2025 | Based on Captain Sabertooth theater plays |
| One Piece | 15 | 2000–present | Based on One Piece anime |
| Pirates of the Caribbean | 5 | 2003–present | Based on the Disney Parks attraction |
