= The Last Pirates =

1908 novel by Emilio Salgari

- Author: Emilio Salgari
- Original title: Gli ultimi filibustieri
- Translator: Michael Amadio
- Language: Italian
- Genre: Adventure novel
- Publication date: 1908
- Publication place: Italy
- Media type: Print (hardback)
- Preceded by: The Son of the Red Corsair
- Original text: Gli ultimi filibustieri at Italian Wikisource

The Last Pirates (original title: Gli ultimi filibustieri ) is an adventure novel written by Italian author Emilio Salgari, published in 1908. It is the final book in Salgari's popular The Black Corsair series.

== Plot summary ==
The Last Pirates follows Countess Ines di Ventimiglia, the daughter of the Red Corsair, as she goes back to Panama to claim her inheritance as granddaughter of the Cacique of Darien. The Marquis de Montelimar, however, eager to marry her and put his hands on the inheritance decides to kidnap her. It's up to Mendoza, Buttafuoco and don Barrejo to free her, which they do with the help of another pirate, Raveneau de Lussan. Once they finish the rescue, they depart with a ship full of gold and retire to live in peace.

== Film adaptation ==
Two film adaptations were made of The Last Pirates, Gli ultimi filibustieri, in 1921 by Vitale De Stefano, and Gli ultimi filibustieri in 1943 by Marco Elter.

== See also ==
- The Black Corsair
- The Queen of the Caribbean
- Son of the Red Corsair
- Sandokan series
- The Mystery of the Black Jungle
- The Tigers of Mompracem
- The Pirates of Malaysia
- The Two Tigers
- The King of the Sea
- Quest for a Throne
