= Captain Tempesta =

Adventure novel

- English Cover
- Author: Emilio Salgari
- Original title: Capitan Tempesta
- Translator: Nico Lorenzutti
- Cover artist: Mad
- Language: English, Original: Italian
- Series: Captain Tempesta
- Genre: Adventure fiction Young adult literature
- Publisher: ROH Press (first English translation); Donath (first Italian publisher)
- Publication date: English 2019; Italian 1905
- Publication place: Italy
- Media type: Paperback, Ebook
- ISBN: 978-1-987886-59-7
- Followed by: The Lion of Damascus

Captain Tempesta (original title: Capitan Tempesta) is a historical adventure novel written by Italian author Emilio Salgari, published in 1905. Set against the backdrop of the Siege of Famagusta during the Ottoman–Venetian War (1570–1573) it features the first female swordswoman in Italian popular fiction, the Duchess Eleanora d'Eboli, better known as Captain Tempesta.

The novel and its sequel The Lion of Damascus were adapted for the big screen in 1942. The films were directed by Corrado D'Errico and starred Carla Candiani as Captain Tempesta.

In 2009 it was selected by Julia Eccleshare as one of the 1001 Children's Books You Must Read Before You Grow Up.

== Plot introduction ==
A warrior in disguise. A lover to be rescued. A city under siege.

Cyprus in 1570 is an island at war. The powerful Ottoman army has taken every city save one, Famagusta, a Venetian port and stronghold. Besieged by a force of 80,000 men, the city has valiantly fought back with its small force of warriors and mercenaries. The greatest among them is Captain Tempesta, a young noble unmatched in bravery and swordsmanship. Few, however, know the captain's secret... that she has donned armour and passed herself off as a man in order to search for her beloved who has been imprisoned by the Turks. Will she triumph? The odds are overwhelmingly against her. The Turks are preparing to storm the city and slay all those within it, and still there has been no word of her beloved's whereabouts...

== Characters ==
- Captain Tempesta -The Duchess Eleanora D'Eboli, master swordswoman
- The Viscount Le Hussière - her beloved
- Sir Perpignan - her lieutenant
- El-Kadur - her loyal Arab servant
- Master Rako - a Venetian quartermaster
- Nikola Stradioto - a Greek ship's captain
- The Lion of Damascus - The greatest warrior in the Ottoman Empire
- Haradja - A pasha's daughter and master of Cornaro Castle
- Metiub - Captain of the Ottoman Naval Infantry and Haradja's right-hand man

== Other novels by Emilio Salgari ==
Novels in the Sandokan Series:

- The Mystery of the Black Jungle
- The Tigers of Mompracem
- The Pirates of Malaysia
- The Two Tigers
- The King of the Sea
- Quest for a Throne

Novels in The Black Corsair series

- The Black Corsair
- The Queen of the Caribbean
- Son of the Red Corsair
