= The Son of the Red Corsair =

The Son of the Red Corsair (Italian: Il figlio del corsaro rosso) may refer to:

- The Son of the Red Corsair (novel), a 1908 novel by the Italian writer Emilio Salgari
- The Son of the Red Corsair (1921 film), an Italian silent adventure film directed by Vitale De Stefano
- The Son of the Red Corsair (1943 film), an Italian adventure film directed by Marco Elter
- The Son of the Red Corsair (1959 film), an Italian adventure film directed by Primo Zeglio
