= The Black Corsair (disambiguation) =

The Black Corsair is an 1898 adventure novel written by Italian novelist Emilio Salgari.

The Black Corsair may also refer to:

- The Black Corsair (1937 film), a 1937 Italian adventure film directed by Amleto Palermi
- The Black Corsair (1976 film), a 1976 Italian adventure film based on Emilio Salgari's novels
- El corsario negro, a 1944 Mexican film

== See also ==
- The Black Pirate, a 1926 silent film
