= Sandokan (disambiguation) =

Sandokan is the main character in a series of novels by Italian author Emilio Salgari (1862–1911).

Sandokan may also refer to:

== Adaptations of the novels ==
- Sandokan (1976 TV series), an Italian series by Sergio Sollima
- Sandokan (1992 animated series), a Spanish series
- Sandokan: The Tiger of Malaysia, a 1998 Italian-French animated series by Marco Pagot
- Sandokan (2025 TV series), an Italian series by Jan Maria Michelini and Nicola Abbatangelo

== Other uses ==
- Sandakan, a city in Sabah, Malaysia
- Sandokanidae, a family of harvestmen which includes the genus Sandokan
- Francesco Schiavone (born 1954), Italian Camorra mobster also dubbed "Sandokan"
