= I pirati della Malesia =

I pirati della Malesia may refer to:

- I pirati della Malesia (novel), an 1896 novel by Emilio Salgari
- I pirati della Malesia (1941 film), a 1941 film starring Massimo Girotti
- I pirati della Malesia (1964 film), a 1964 film starring Steve Reeves
