= The Tigers of Mompracem (film) =

1970 film by Mario Sequi

- Spanish poster
- Directed by: Mario Sequi
- Written by: Emilio Salgari (novel); Eduardo Manzanos; Alfredo Tucci; Mario Sequi
- Produced by: Giancarlo Marchetti
- Starring: Ivan Rassimov; Claudia Gravy; Andrea Bosic
- Cinematography: Emilio Foriscot
- Edited by: Pietro Paolo Benedetti
- Music by: Angelo Francesco Lavagnino
- Production companies: Filmes Cinematografica; Copercines
- Distributed by: Chamartín; Titanus
- Release date: 11 December 1970
- Running time: 90 minutes
- Countries: Italy; Spain
- Language: Italian

The Tigers of Mompracem (Italian: Le tigri di Mompracem) is a 1970 Italian-Spanish historical adventure film directed by Mario Sequi and starring Ivan Rassimov, Claudia Gravy and Andrea Bosic. It is an adaptation of the 1900 novel of the same name by Emilio Salgari featuring his hero, the Malayan pirate Sandokan.

The film's sets were designed by the art directors José Luis Galicia and Jaime Pérez Cubero.

== Cast ==
- Ivan Rassimov as Sandokan
- Claudia Gravy as Marianna Guillonk
- Andrea Bosic as Yanez
- José Torres as Tremal Naik
- Luis Dávila as Lord Brooke
- Mimmo Palmara as Man Saved from Crocodiles
- Cris Huerta as Giro Batol
- Lorenzo Terzon as Capt. Rosenthal
- Anna Zinnemann as Liana
- José María Caffarel as Maharaja Varauni
- Ángel Menéndez as Lord Guillonk
- Dakar as Kammamuri
- Gino Marturano as Sambigliong
- Alfredo Santacruz as Maharaja of Sarawak
- Nerio Bernardi as Grande Brahmano
- Enzo Fiermonte as Sergeant
- Miguel del Castillo as Monsieur Gaston

== Bibliography ==
- Goble, Alan. The Complete Index to Literary Sources in Film. Walter de Gruyter, 1999.
