= The Son of the Red Corsair (1921 film) =

1921 film

- Directed by: Vitale De Stefano
- Based on: The Son of the Red Corsair by Emilio Salgari
- Production company: De Rosa Film
- Distributed by: De Rosa Film
- Release date: October 1921
- Running time: 110 minutes
- Country: Italy
- Languages: Silent; Italian intertitles

The Son of the Red Corsair (Italian: Il figlio del Corsaro Rosso) is a 1921 Italian silent historical adventure film directed by Vitale De Stefano. It is an adaptation of the 1908 novel of the same title by Emilio Salgari. It was part of a series of Salgari adaptations by the Milan-based De Rosa Film. The story was subsequently remade as a sound film The Son of the Red Corsair in 1943.

== Cast ==
- Rodolfo Badaloni as il figlio del corsaro rosso
- Nera Badaloni
- Anita Faraboni
- Carlo Re
- Vitale Di Stefano
- Riccardo Tassoni

== Bibliography ==
- Goble, Alan. The Complete Index to Literary Sources in Film. Walter de Gruyter, 1999.
