= The Two Tigers (film) =

- Directed by: Giorgio Simonelli
- Written by: Andrea Di Robilant; Marcello Pagliero
- Based on: The Two Tigers by Emilio Salgari
- Produced by: Andrea Di Robilant
- Starring: Massimo Girotti; Luigi Pavese; Sandro Ruffini
- Cinematography: Domenico Scala; Carlo Montuori
- Edited by: Duilio A. Lucarelli
- Music by: Umberto Gelassi; Raffaele Gervasio
- Production company: Sol Film
- Distributed by: Generalcine
- Release date: 29 November 1941
- Running time: 85 minutes
- Country: Italy
- Language: Italian

The Two Tigers (Italian: Le due tigri) is a 1941 Italian historical adventure film directed by Giorgio Simonelli and starring Massimo Girotti, Luigi Pavese and Sandro Ruffini. It is based on the 1904 novel The Two Tigers by Emilio Salgari, featuring the character of Sandokan. It was made back-to-back with another Sandokan adventure Pirates of Malaya.

It was shot at the Cinecittà Studios in Rome. The film's sets were designed by the art director Alfredo Montori.

== Cast ==
- Massimo Girotti as Tremal-Naik
- Luigi Pavese as Sandokan
- Sandro Ruffini as Yanez de Gomera
- Alanova as Surama
- Cesare Fantoni as Sujodana
- Enzo Gerio as Aghur
- Giovanni Onorato as Sambigliong
- Arturo Bragaglia as Il taverniere
- Amedeo Trilli as Sirdar
- Bruno Smith as Il caporale della ronda
- Agnese Dubbini as La moglie di Sambigliong
- Delia Lancelotti as La piccola Darma
- Virgilio Tomassini as Il manti
- Totò Majorana as Un sergente Inglese

== Bibliography ==
- Goble, Alan. The Complete Index to Literary Sources in Film. Walter de Gruyter, 1999.
