= Pirates of Malaya =

1941 film

- Italian: I pirati della Malesia
- Directed by: Enrico Guazzoni
- Written by: Andrea Di Robilant; Mino Doletti; Gianni Franciolini
- Based on: The Pirates of Malaysia by Emilio Salgari
- Produced by: Andrea Di Robilant
- Starring: Massimo Girotti; Clara Calamai; Camillo Pilotto
- Cinematography: Carlo Montuori; Domenico Scala
- Edited by: Duilio A. Lucarelli
- Music by: Umberto Gelassi; Raffaele Gervasio
- Production company: Sol Film
- Distributed by: Generalcine
- Release date: 19 October 1941
- Running time: 90 minutes
- Country: Italy
- Language: Italian

Pirates of Malaya (Italian: I pirati della Malesia) is a 1941 Italian historical adventure film directed by Enrico Guazzoni and starring Massimo Girotti, Clara Calamai and Camillo Pilotto.

It is based on Emilio Salgari's 1896 novel The Pirates of Malaysia. It was shot at the Cinecittà Studios in Rome back to back with The Two Tigers, of which it is the sequel. The film's sets were designed by the art director Alfredo Montori. The same novel was later adapted by Umberto Lenzi for the 1964 film Pirates of Malaysia.

== Cast ==
- Massimo Girotti as Tremal-Naik
- Clara Calamai as Ada
- Camillo Pilotto as Kammamuri
- Luigi Pavese as Sandokan
- Sandro Ruffini as Janez
- Greta Gonda as Baroness van Zeeland
- Nino Pavese as Lord Brooke
- Anita Farra as La taverniera
- Cesare Fantoni as Sujodana
- Enzo Gerio as Aghur
- Zara Lammarì as La danzatrice indiana
- Carlo Ludovici as Hassim
- Oreste Onorato as Sambigliong
- Aldo Pini as Namur
- Valeria Roberti as Melahia
- Otello Toso as Il tenente Schmidt

== See also ==
- Sandokan
