= Jungle Adventurer =

- Directed by: Umberto Lenzi
- Screenplay by: Fulvio Gicca
- Produced by: Solly V. Bianco
- Starring: Richard Harrison; Luciana Gilli; Wilbert Bradley; Daniele Vargas
- Cinematography: Angelo Lotti
- Edited by: Jolanda Benvenuti
- Music by: Francesco De Masi
- Production company: Filmes
- Release date: 1965
- Running time: 105 minutes
- Country: Italy

Jungle Adventurer (Italian: La montagna di luce, lit. 'The Mountain of Light') is an Italian adventure film. It starred Richard Harrison.

The film is loosely based on Emilio Salgari's 1902 adventure novel La montagna di luce (The Mountain of Light), which narrates a fictitious attempt to steal the priceless Koh-i-Noor diamond, concocted in 19th-century India by the Thuggee and the dacoits. The original Italian title of both the film and the source novel refers to the name of the jewel.

The film was re-released under several alternate titles, one of which, Sandok, was an attempt to capitalize on the popularity of Salgari's fictional pirate Sandokan, even though neither the novel, nor the film had anything to do with Sandokan's character or the settings of his adventures.

== Cast ==
- Richard Harrison as Alan Foster
- Luciana Gilli as Lilamani
- Wilbert Bradley as Sitama
- Daniele Vargas as Rajah Sindar
- Andrea Scotti
- Nerio Bernardi
- Giovanni Cianfriglia as Sergeant
- Nazzareno Zamperla as Sitama's Man #1
- Dakar as Sitama's Man #2

== Reception ==
From contemporary reviews, an anonymous reviewer in the Monthly Film Bulletin reviewed a dubbed 87 minute version of the film. The reviewer noted that Malaysian locations were put to good use for the film, and that it "is treated lightly enough to seem a good deal less corny than its well-worn theme." The reviewer found Richard Harrison (actor) as "an adequate hero" while Wilbert Bradley was "as superbly gleeful rogue."
