= Sandokan to the Rescue =

Book by Emilio Salgari

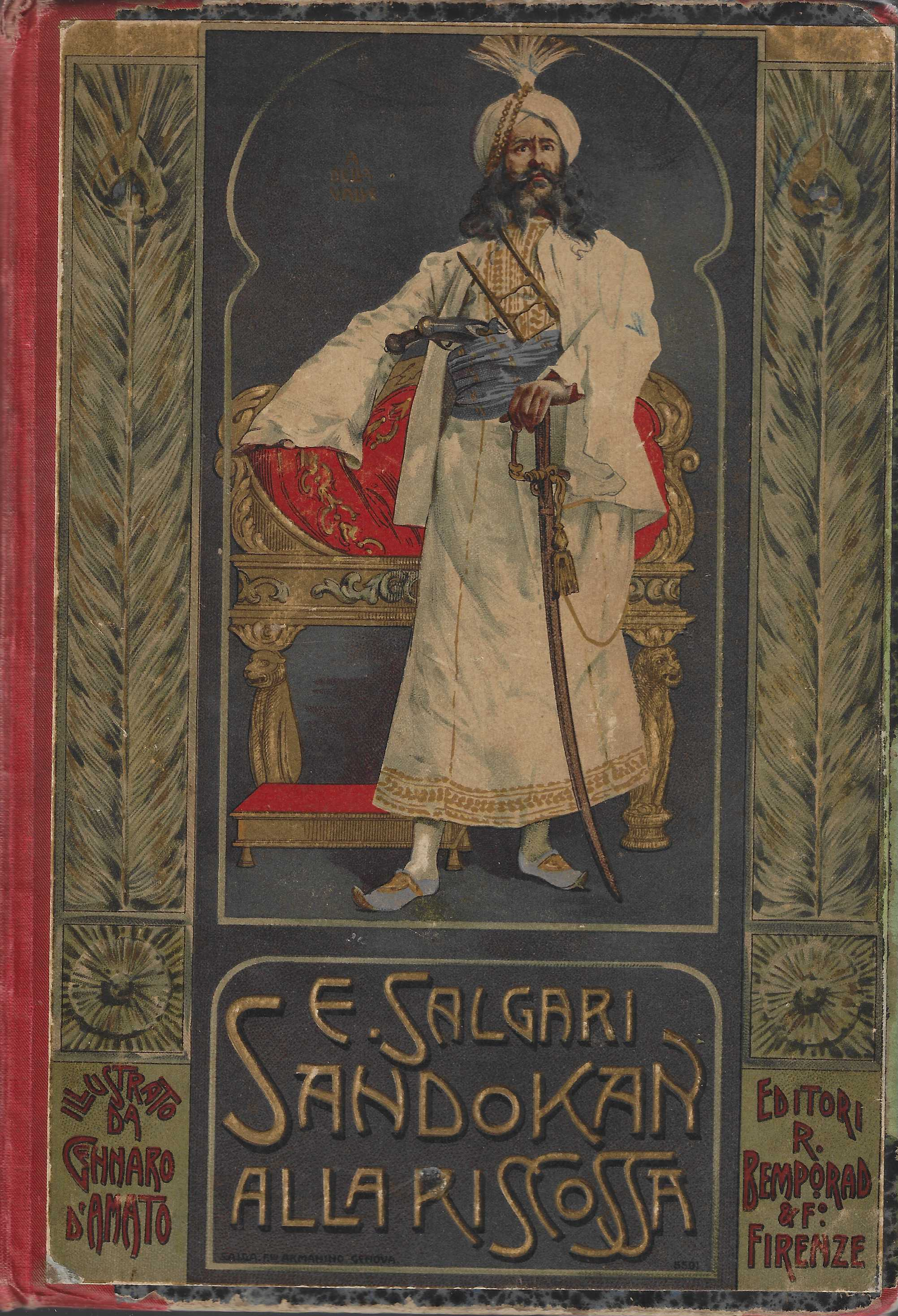
- Cover of Sandokan alla riscossa, 1st edition, R. Bemporad e Figlio, 1908
- Author: Emilio Salgari
- Language: Italian
- Genre: Adventure
- Publication date: 1907
- Publication place: Italy
- Media type: Print
- Preceded by: Quest for a Throne

Sandokan to the Rescue (Italian: Sandokan alla riscossa) is a 1907 adventure novel by the Italian writer Emilio Salgari. It is the seventh in his series featuring the nineteenth century Malayan pirate Sandokan. It is also known by the alternative title The Reckoning.

== Adaptation ==
In 1964 it served as the basis for a film adaptation of the same name directed by Luigi Capuano and starring Ray Danton in the title role. A later film La tigre è ancora viva: Sandokan alla riscossa! was also inspired by the novel.

== Bibliography ==
- Goble, Alan. The Complete Index to Literary Sources in Film. Walter de Gruyter, 1999.
