= Sweet Salgari =

2012 comic book by Paolo Bacilieri

- Page count: 160 pages
- Publisher: Coconino Press

Creative team
- Writer: Paolo Bacilieri
- Artist: Paolo Bacilieri

Original publication
- Date of publication: 1 March 2012
- Language: Italian
- ISBN: 9788876182068

Sweet Salgari is a 2012 Italian comic book by Paolo Bacilieri. It is a biography about the adventure novelist Emilio Salgari. It begins with Salgari's violent death in 1911 and traces his life from there. The comic only evokes his colourful adventure settings through text quotations, creating a contrast between what Salgari imagines and the ordinary world that is portrayed visually.
