= Sandokan (1992 animated series) =

Children's animated television series produced by BRB Internacional

- Genre: Adventure
- Based on: the Sandokan series by Emilio Salgari
- Developed by: Claudio Biern Boyd
- Theme music composer: Guido and Maurizio De Angelis
- Country of origin: Spain
- Original language: Spanish
- No. of episodes: 26

Production
- Running time: 30 mins
- Production companies: BRB Internacional; Tele 5

Original release
- Network: Tele 5
- Release: 10 October 1991 – 1992

Sandokan is a Spanish animated television adaptation of the Sandokan novels by Emilio Salgari, produced by Spanish studio BRB Internacional and Tele 5, in what amounted to the private network's first co-produced animated series. Unlike the later animated series produced by Mondo TV, the characters here are anthropomorphic animals (Sandokan himself is an anthropomorphic tiger).

== Background ==
Claudio Biern Boyd read the original Salgari novels as a child and brought the 1976 miniseries to Spain; moreover, he gained intimate connections with one of the two members behind Oliver Onions, who composed the theme song to the series, and, subsequently, the theme songs for several BRB productions in the 1980s.

The series was coproduced with Tele 5 and features anthropomorphic characters; the Dayaks, including Sandokan, are represented by felines, while the British are represented by dogs.

== Plot ==
Having lost his throne to the Rajah of Sarawak, Sandokan resorts to piracy.

== Release ==
The series first aired on Tele 5 on 10 October 1992. The English dub first aired on Channel 4 in the UK around the same time. Some episodes were condensed into a movie (The Princess and the Pirate) which was released on video in North America. In 1996, BRB sold the rights to RTL (which co-produced Mort and Phil) and CBBC.

In 2012, the series was added to Toon Goggles as part of an output deal with BRB.
