= The Son of the Red Corsair (1959 film) =

1959 film

- Directed by: Primo Zeglio
- Written by: Fede Arnaud; Alberto Liberati; Primo Zeglio
- Based on: The Son of the Red Corsair by Emilio Salgari
- Produced by: Luigi Carpentieri; Ermanno Donati
- Starring: Lex Barker; Sylvia Lopez; Vira Silenti
- Cinematography: Carlo Carlini
- Edited by: Roberto Cinquini
- Music by: Roman Vlad
- Production companies: Athena Cinematografica; Donati Film
- Release date: 25 June 1959
- Running time: 96 minutes
- Language: Italian

The Son of the Red Corsair (Italian: Il figlio del corsaro rosso) is a 1959 Italian historical adventure film written and directed by Primo Zeglio and starring Lex Barker, Sylvia Lopez and Vira Silenti. It is based on the novel with the same name by Emilio Salgari. The story had previously been made into a 1943 film The Son of the Red Corsair.

The film's sets were designed by the art directors Mario Chiari and Alfredo Montori.

== Cast ==
- Lex Barker as Enrico di Ventimiglia
- Sylvia Lopez as Carmen di Montélimar
- Vira Silenti as Neala di Ventimiglia
- Luciano Marin as Miguel di Montélimar
- Antonio Crast as Don Juan de Sasebo
- Fanfulla as Marquese di Montélimar
- Vicky Lagos as Paquita
- Roberto Paoletti as Barrejo
- Nietta Zocchi as Isabella
- Saro Urzì as Mendoza
- Elio Pandolfi as Sergeant
- Livio Lorenzon as José
- Franco Fantasia as Dorado
- Giorgio Costantini as Van Hais

== Bibliography ==
- Goble, Alan. The Complete Index to Literary Sources in Film. Walter de Gruyter, 1999.
