= Sandro Ruffini =

Italian actor (1889–1954)

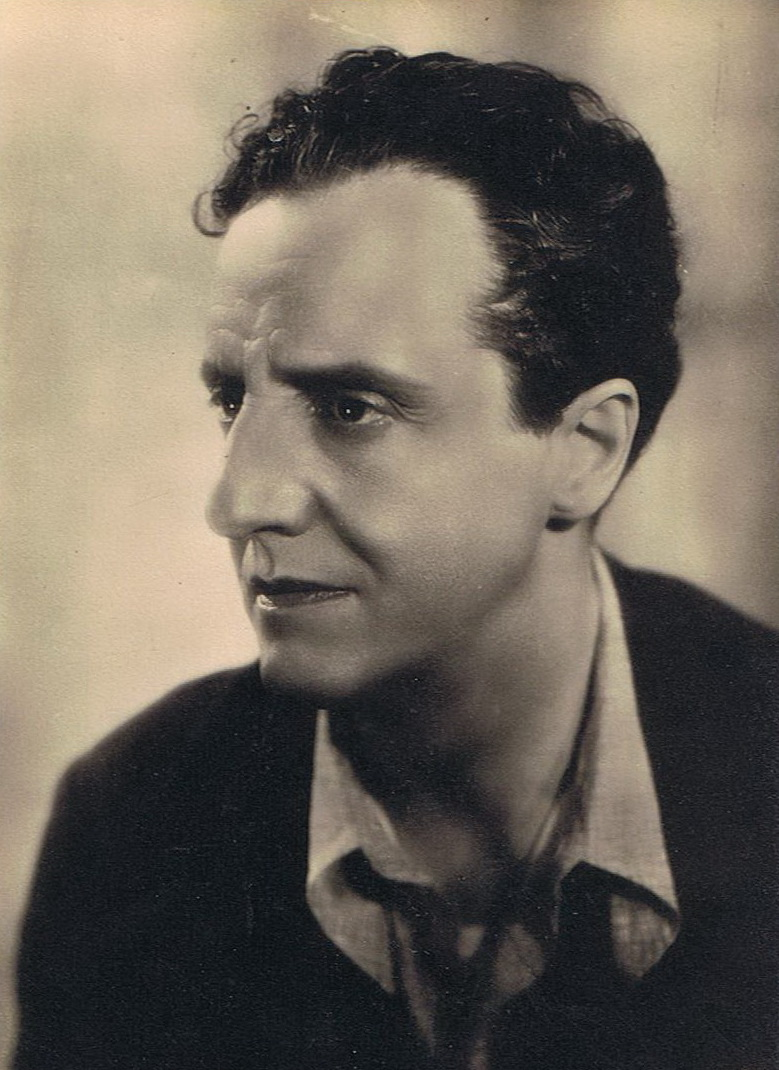
- Born: Alessandro Ruffini; 21 September 1889; Rome, Italy
- Died: 29 November 1954 (aged 65); Rome, Italy
- Occupations: Actor; voice actor
- Years active: 1913–1954

Alessandro "Sandro" Ruffini (21 September 1889 – 29 November 1954) was an Italian actor and voice actor.

Born in Rome, Ruffini appeared in 64 films between 1913 and 1954, and was also active in theatre and radio. He was well known for his beautiful "aristocratic" voice and dubbed the voices of many actors for the Italian versions of their films, including Leslie Howard in Gone with the Wind, Clifton Webb in Laura, and Charlie Chaplin in Limelight.

== Selected filmography ==
- Odette (1916)
- The Last Tsars (1928)
- Giallo (1933)
- White Amazons (1936)
- The Knight of San Marco (1939)
- The Daughter of the Green Pirate (1940)
- Abandonment (1940)
- Eternal Melodies (1940)
- Schoolgirl Diary (1941)
- The Two Tigers (1941)
- Pirates of Malaya (1941)
- Thrill (1941)
- Fedora (1942)
- The Testimony (1946)
- Lost in the Dark (1947)
- Cab Number 13 (1948)
- The Man with the Grey Glove (1948)
- The Two Sisters (1950)
- Sunday Heroes (1952)
- Ivan, Son of the White Devil (1953)
- On Trial (1954)
- Orient Express (1954)
- The Two Orphans (1954)
