= The Black Corsair (1976 film) =

- Directed by: Sergio Sollima
- Screenplay by: Alberto Silvestri; Sergio Sollima
- Based on: Il corsaro nero La regina dei caraibi by Emilio Salgari
- Produced by: Luigi Rovere
- Starring: Kabir Bedi; Carole Andre; Mel Ferrer
- Cinematography: Alberto Spagnoli
- Edited by: Alberto Gallitti
- Music by: Guido & Maurizio De Angelis
- Production company: Rizzoli Film
- Distributed by: Rizzoli Film
- Release date: 22 December 1976
- Running time: 126 minutes

The Black Corsair (Italian: Il corsaro nero) is an adventure film. It is based on two Emilio Salgari novels, The Black Corsair and The Queen of the Caribbean.

== Plot ==
Emilio di Roccabruna, The Black Corsair, seeks revenge against Governor Van Gould for the murder of his family.

== Cast ==
- Kabir Bedi: The Black Corsair
- Carole André: Dutchess Honorata Van Gould
- Mel Ferrer: Van Gould
- Angelo Infanti: Morgan
- Jackie Basehart: The Red Corsair
- Niccolò Piccolomini: The Green Corsair
- Sal Borgese: Carmaux
- Franco Fantasia: Van Stiller
- Tony Renis: José
- Sonja Jeannine: Yara
- Edoardo Faieta: L'Olonnais
- Mariano Rigillo: Count of Lerma
- Dagmar Lassander: Marquise of Bermejo

== Production ==
Sollima said that he chose to adapt The Black Corsair because he was reluctant to make another Sandokan production so soon. He described the characters around the Corsair as less clear-cut and less driven by politics and patriotism than those in Sandokan. La Stampa reported that thirteen weeks of filming were planned in Colombia and that the production was expected to cost about two billion lire.

In early June 1976, Stampa Sera reported that the production was due to leave for Cartagena, Colombia, in the last ten days of the month and that two galleons were nearing completion for the sea battles.

In July, a storm capsized both ships during the filming of a boarding scene off Cartagena, interrupting production. Carole André and Kabir Bedi were among those aboard.

== Release ==
The Black Corsair was released on December 22, 1976.

== See also ==
- List of Italian films of 1976
