= The Two Tigers =

Italian adventure novel

- English Cover
- Author: Emilio Salgari
- Original title: Le due tigri
- Translator: Nico Lorenzutti
- Language: English, Original: Italian
- Genre: Adventure fiction Young adult literature
- Publisher: ROH Press (first English translation); Donath (first Italian publisher)
- Publication date: English 2007; Italian 1904
- Publication place: Italy
- Media type: Paperback, Ebook
- ISBN: 978-0978270742
- Preceded by: The Pirates of Malaysia
- Followed by: The King of the Sea

The Two Tigers (original title: Le due tigri) is the fourth adventure novel in the Sandokan series written by Italian author Emilio Salgari, published in 1904.

== Plot summary ==
India, 1857. Sandokan, Yáñez, and the Tigers of Mompracem arrive to assist Tremal-Naik, whose young daughter, Darma, has been kidnapped by the Thugs of the Kali cult. Together with him, the Tigers venture into the swampy Ganges Delta, prepared to destroy the sect, rescue the girl, and eliminate their leader, Suyodhana. In the course of this adventure, Yáñez meets the woman who will become the love of his life: the devadasi Surama.

== Film versions ==
In 1941 Italian director Giorgio Simonelli adapted the book into the film titled Le Due Tigri (The Two Tigers), starring Luigi Pavese as Sandokan, Massimo Girotti as Tremal-Naik, and Sandro Ruffini as Yanez.

== Trivia ==
- The action takes place against the backdrop of the Great Mutiny, the Indian Rebellion of 1857.
- Many of the events described in the novel actually occurred..

== See also ==
Novels in the Sandokan Series:

- The Mystery of the Black Jungle
- The Tigers of Mompracem
- The Pirates of Malaysia
- The King of the Sea
- Quest for a Throne

Novels in The Black Corsair series

- The Black Corsair
- The Queen of the Caribbean
- Son of the Red Corsair
