= Sandokan =

Fictional 19th century pirate created by Italian author Emilio Salgari

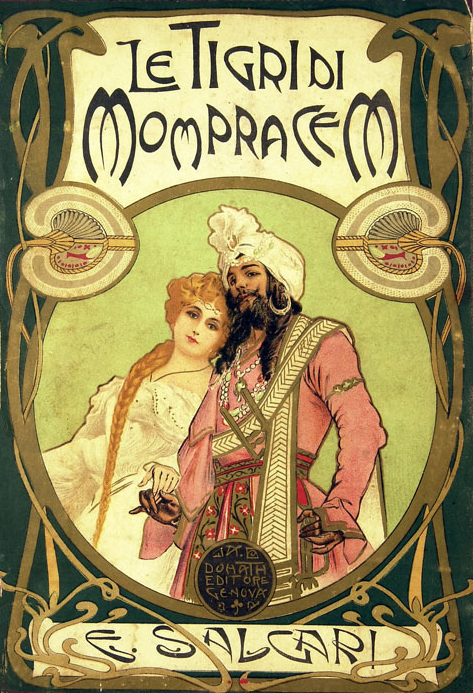
- Sandokan and Marianna "The Pearl of Labuan" on the cover, drawn by Alberto della Valle, of the novel The Tigers of Mompracem (1900)
- Created by: Emilio Salgari
- Portrayed by: Luigi Pavese (1941); Steve Reeves (1964); Ray Danton (1964); Ivan Rassimov (1970); Kabir Bedi (1976–1998); Can Yaman (2025)

In-universe information
- Alias: The Tiger of Malaya
- Gender: Male
- Occupation: Pirate, warrior, prince (later rajah)
- Spouse: Marianna Guillonk
- Nationality: Bornean

Sandokan is a fictional late 19th-century pirate created by Italian author Emilio Salgari. His adventures first appeared in publication in 1883. Sandokan is the hero of 11 adventure novels. Within the series, Sandokan is known throughout the South China Sea as the "Tiger of Malaya".

== Sandokan series ==
Emilio Salgari wrote several novels telling the adventures of Sandokan and Yanez, two of his most legendary creations. They are introduced in The Tigers of Mompracem, which portrays their struggle against Dutch and British. In many sequels, they fight against James Brooke, a white-skinned adventurer, self-appointed as Rajah of Sarawak; they also move to India to smash down the Thugs, a notorious band of stranglers devoted to the goddess Kali.

== Novels ==
- The Mystery of the Black Jungle (I Misteri della Jungla Nera, 1895)
- The Pirates of Malaysia (I Pirati della Malesia, 1896)
- The Tigers of Mompracem (Le Tigri di Mompracem, 1900)
- The Two Tigers (Le due Tigri, 1904)
- The King of the Sea (Il Re del Mare, 1906)
- Quest for a Throne (Alla conquista di un impero, 1907)
- Sandokan to the Rescue (Sandokan alla riscossa, 1907)
- Return to Mompracem (La riconquista del Mompracem, 1908)
- The Brahman (Il Bramino dell'Assam, 1911)
- An Empire Crumbles (La caduta di un impero, 1911) (published posthumously)
- Yanez' Revenge (La rivincita di Yanez, 1913) (published posthumously)

=== Follow-up works ===
Other Sandokan adventures were written by Italian novelist Luigi Motta, Emilio Fancelli, and by Salgari's son, Omar. Paco Ignacio Taibo II has published a recent "Sandokan" novel entitled The Return of the Tigers of Malaysia. Gianni Padoan has edited a series of novels that are declaredly a sci-fi reinterpretation of the Tigers of Malaysia series by Emilio Salgari: I misteri della stella nera (Mondadori 1978), I pirati della galassia (Mondadori 1978), Le tigri di Moonpracer (Mondadori 1979), Alla conquista di Rigel (Mondadori 1980).

== Fictional biography ==
Sandokan is the son of Kaigadan, the last Prince of Borneo, whose parents were killed by the East India Company in a bid to seize the throne. Having sworn revenge, Sandokan gathers a group of rebels and pirates, the Tigers of Mompracem (now Pulau Kuraman), to regain his Princedom, and adopts the nickname of "Tiger of Malaysia". Stranded in Labuan, Sandokan is recovering of his wounds in the house of Lord James Guillonk, where he meets Marianna, the Lord's niece, aka the "Pearl of Labuan", whom he falls in love with. Sandokan escapes, but reunites with Marianna, and later marries her. After his defeat, Sandokan set his men free from jail, and apparently gives up piracy, and escapes to Java with his wife. Actually, Sandokan and his friend, Yanez De Gomera, continue to help their friend Kammamuri to fight James Brooke, the "Exterminator", the White Rajah of Sarawak, and finally to free Tremal-Naik. Sandokan later has to help Tremal-Naik again, when his daughter is kidnapped by Thugs, Kali-yug's worshippers, a sect of killers commanded by Suyodhana, the "Tiger of India".

Following many battles over a period of years, Sandokan defeats all of his enemies and retires as rajah of Kini Balù (Ambong and Marudu). His friend Yanez is appointed rajah of Assam.

=== Characteristics ===
The character of Sandokan was inspired by the Spanish naval captain Carlos Cuarteroni Fernández and Sabahan rajah Sharif Uthman. He is depicted by Salgari as a gallant pirate. He is described as tall, charming, very muscular, slender, and attractive, with cold, black eyes, a fierce and severe look, and a big turban on his head. Unlike his troops, who are described as mostly half-naked, Sandokan always wears fine oriental clothes, generally red silk with embroidered gold, and long, red, leather boots.

Sandokan is a formidable fighter, brave, and ruthless with his enemies, but kind, generous, and faithful to his friends. He has absolute leadership over his men, and is often shown as having no fear, with Yanez playing as a sort of counterweight to his impulsive nature.

== Supporting characters ==
- Lady Marianna Guillonk, also known as the Pearl of Labuan, Sandokan's Italian-English wife
- Yanez De Gomera: Sandokan's loyal friend and comrade, a Portuguese Goan
- James Brooke, the White Rajah of Sarawak, their worst enemy
- Lord James Guillonk, Marianna's uncle, eager to kill Sandokan
- Tremal-Naik, Indian from Bengal
- Kammamuri, Tremal-Naik's servant

== In popular media ==
=== Films ===
The first Sandokan films were made in 1941 in Italy with Luigi Pavese as Sandokan.

- Pirates of Malaya (I pirati della Malesia) (dir. Enrico Guazzoni)
- The Two Tigers (Le due tigri) (dir. Giorgio Simonelli)

A series of Italian-made films with American leads were filmed in 1964 and released internationally.

- Sandokan the Great (Sandokan, la tigre di Mompracem) (1964), starring Steve Reeves (dir. Umberto Lenzi)
- Pirates of Malaysia (I pirati della Malesia) (1964) a.k.a. Pirates of the Seven Seas, starring Reeves (dir. Umberto Lenzi)
- Sandokan to the Rescue (Sandokan alla riscossa) (1964) a.k.a. Sandokan Fights Back, starring Ray Danton (dir. Luigi Capuano)
- Sandokan Against the Leopard of Sarawak (Sandokan contro il leopardo di Sarawak) (1964) a.k.a. Return of Sandokan, starring Danton (dir. Luigi Capuano)

A 1970 Italian-Spanish film The Tigers of Mompracem was made with Ivan Rassimov as Sandokan

Additionally, Temple of the White Elephant (a.k.a. Sandok, il Maciste della giungla) with Mimmo Palmara (1964, dir. Umberto Lenzi), who played a character named "Sandok", inspired by Salgari's character. Meanwhile, The Mountain of Light, a.k.a. Jungle Adventurer, with Richard Harrison (1965, dir. Umberto Lenzi) was retitled "Sandok" in certain territories, itself being based on a non-Sandokan Salgari novel.

=== Television ===
In 1976, Indian actor Kabir Bedi played the lead in Sandokan, a six-part miniseries for European television directed by Sergio Sollima. Carole André was cast as Lady Marianna Guillonk, Philippe Leroy played Sandokan's trusted friend and lieutenant Yanez De Gomera. The role of the main antagonist James Brooke was performed by Adolfo Celi.

In 1977, Kabir Bedi reprised his role in the film La tigre è ancora viva: Sandokan alla riscossa! (The Tiger Lives Again: Sandokan to the Rescue!). The TV series theme song, "Sandokan", was composed by Oliver Onions (a pseudonym of the De Angelis brothers), and made the top 10 in many European countries, albeit mostly in the translated English version.

A 2004 documentary, Sandokan's Adventure, detailed the making of the series.

Two further television series were made The Return of Sandokan in 1996 and The Son of Sandokan in 1998, with Kabir Bedi again reprising his role.

In 2025, Lux Vide and Rai Fiction produced a new international adaptation titled Sandokan, developed by Alessandro Sermoneta, Scott Rosenbaum, and Davide Lantieri. The series stars Can Yaman as Sandokan, Alanah Bloor as Lady Marianna Guillonk, and Ed Westwick as Lord James Brooke.

Filming began in April 2024 across Italy and Réunion Island. Following its premiere on Rai 1 in Italy on 1 December 2025, the series was released internationally as a Netflix production in several territories, including the United States and United Kingdom, on 19 January 2026. This version exercises significant creative license compared to the Emilio Salgari novels; notably, Sandokan is portrayed as growing up in Singapore rather than Borneo.

=== Animation ===
The first animated series, Sandokan, was released in 1992 by Spanish animation studio BRB International, and broadcast in the United Kingdom on Channel 4 and Republic of Ireland on RTE Two. It was later repeated in the UK on certain ITV regions in 1996. This children's animated show, written by Doug Stone and Dave Mallow, is loosely based on Salgari's novels. In the show, Sandokan (here an anthropomorphized tiger) is an usurped prince, who travels the seas as a pirate seeking to reclaim his rightful throne from the Rajah of Sarawak. He battles the evil maharajah, who killed his parents. In the midst of this local struggle, Sandokan falls in love with Mariana (here an anthropomorphized deer), who is the daughter of a European power, who has naval influence over the area. The first nine episodes of the series are available in three DVD volumes in the United Kingdom. A condensed version of the series was released as an animated movie, The Princess and the Pirate, in 1995.

Another animated series, this time with human characters, was released in 1998 from a coproduction among RAI on 1993−94, SEK Studio, and Mondo TV and broadcast in Italy on Rai 1. This 26-episode series was composed of three parts: Sandokan, la tigre della Malesia (Sandokan, the Tiger of Malaysia, produced in 1998); Sandokan, la tigre ruggisce ancora (Sandokan, the Tiger roars again, 2000); and Sandokan, le due tigri (Sandokan, The Two Tigers, 2004). The story takes place in the second half of the 19th century, and is situated in the Malaysian archipelago, Borneo, and India.
