= The Black Corsair (1937 film) =

- Directed by: Amleto Palermi
- Written by: Emilio Salgari (novel); Amleto Palermi
- Starring: Ciro Verratti; Silvana Jachino; Ada Biagini; Nerio Bernardi
- Cinematography: George Fanto; Václav Vích
- Edited by: Amleto Palermi
- Music by: Alessandro Cicognini
- Production company: Artisti Associati
- Distributed by: Artisti Associati
- Release date: 1937
- Running time: 96 minutes
- Country: Italy
- Language: Italian

The Black Corsair (Italian: Il corsaro nero) is a 1937 Italian adventure film directed by Amleto Palermi and starring Ciro Verratti, Silvana Jachino and Ada Biagini. The film is an adaptation of the 1898 novel The Black Corsair by Emilio Salgari.

== Cast ==
- Ciro Verratti as Emilio Ventimiglia, the Black Corsair
- Silvana Jachino as Honorata
- Ada Biagini as Amy
- Nerio Bernardi as Van Gould, Gouvernor of Maracaibo
- Piero Carnabuci as Giovanni
- Cesco Baseggio as Van Stiller, Corsair
- Checco Durante as Carmeau, Corsair
- Guido Celano as Morgan, Corsair
- Olinto Cristina as Rabouillon, Spanish Commander
- C. Conti as Stoik, Spanish Sergeant

== Bibliography ==
- Moliterno, Gino. The A to Z of Italian Cinema. Scarecrow Press, 2009.
