= The Tigers of Mompracem =

1900 novel by Emilio Salgari

- English-language cover
- Author: Emilio Salgari
- Original title: Le Tigri di Mompracem
- Translator: Nico Lorenzutti
- Language: Italian
- Series: The Sandokan Series
- Genre: Adventure fiction Young adult literature
- Publisher: ROH Press (first English translation); Donath (first Italian publisher)
- Publication date: English: 2008; Italian: 1900
- Publication place: Italy
- Media type: Paperback, Ebook
- Pages: 272
- ISBN: 978-0978270728
- Followed by: The Mystery of the Black Jungle

The Tigers of Mompracem (original title: Le Tigri di Mompracem) is an exotic adventure novel written by Italian author Emilio Salgari, published in 1900. It features his most famous character, Sandokan.

It was adapted into a 1970 film The Tigers of Mompracem directed by Mario Sequi.

== Plot introduction ==
In 19th century Malaysia, the Tigers of Mompracem are a band of rebel pirates fighting against the colonial power of the Dutch Empire and British Empire. They are led by Sandokan, the indomitable Tiger of Malaysia, and his loyal friend Yanez De Gomera, a Portuguese wanderer and adventurer. After twelve years of spilling blood and spreading terror throughout Malaysia, Sandokan has reached the height of his power, but when the pirate learns of the extraordinary "Pearl of Labuan", his fortunes begin to change.

== Characters ==
- Sandokan - The Tiger of Malaysia, leader of the Tigers of Mompracem
- Lady Marianna Guillonk - The Pearl of Labuan
- Yanez De Gomera - A Portuguese adventurer, second in command to Sandokan
- Lord James Guillonk - Marianna's uncle
- Baron William Rosenthal - A British officer
- Patan
- Giro-Batol
- Juioko

== See also ==
Novels in the Sandokan Series:

- The Mystery of the Black Jungle
- The Pirates of Malaysia
- The Two Tigers
- The King of the Sea
- Quest for a Throne

Novels in The Black Corsair series:

- The Black Corsair
- The Queen of the Caribbean
- Son of the Red Corsair

Captain Tempesta novels:

- Captain Tempesta
- The Lion of Damascus
