= The Queen of the Caribbean =

2015 novel by Emilio Salgari

- Cover First English Translation
- Author: Emilio Salgari
- Original title: La regina dei caraibi
- Translator: Nico Lorenzutti
- Language: English, Original: Italian
- Series: The Black Corsair
- Genre: Adventure fiction Young adult literature
- Publisher: ROH Press (first English translation); Donath (first Italian publisher)
- Publication date: English 2015, Italian 1901
- Publication place: Italy
- Media type: Paperback, Ebook
- Pages: 280
- Preceded by: The Black Corsair
- Followed by: Yolanda, the Black Corsair's Daughter

The Queen of the Caribbean is a 1901 adventure novel written by Italian novelist Emilio Salgari. Set in the Caribbean during the Golden Age of Piracy, the novel follows the exploits of Emilio Roccanera, Lord of Ventimiglia as he continues his attempts to avenge his brothers, slain by the Duke Van Guld, as narrated in the first book of the series, The Black Corsair. This novel focuses on the struggles between the Black Corsair's quest for vengeance and his guilt for having abandoned Honorata, his love interest and daughter of his enemy.

== Plot summary ==
Four years have passed since the pirates' sacking of Maracaibo and Gibraltar. The Black Corsair has tracked his nemesis, Duke Van Guld, down to Veracruz at last, and (after his mighty ally Olonnais had been killed by some red men) he formed an alliance with Nicholas van Hoorn, Michel de Grammont and Laurens de Graaf, three of the most formidable pirates in the Gulf, to finally bring the traitor to justice. After Van Guld explodes his ship as a final resource, the Black Corsair and some of his men (the very same Carmaux, Van Stiller and Moko from the first novel) are lost in the jungles, at which point they're captured by the native Caribs. Fortunately for the filibusters, Honorata Van Guld had shipwrecked on that coast before and was believed by the natives to be a sea deity and then followed as their queen. After they're freed by her, the Corsair decides to stop his piracy and return with Honorata to Italy.

== The Series ==
The quest for vengeance stretches over the course of several novels: The Black Corsair (Il corsaro nero),The Queen of the Caribbean (La regina dei Caraibi), Yolanda, The Black Corsair's Daughter (Jolanda, la figlia del Corsaro Nero), and The Son of the Red Corsair (Il figlio del corsaro rosso).

== Film versions ==
There have been several film versions of the novels. In the 1920s, director Vitale Di Stefano first brought the Corsair trilogy to the screen with a series of silent films. In 1937, Amleto Palermi directed the first remake of Il corsaro nero and Italian fencing champion Ciro Verratti was cast to play the Black Corsair. In 1944, Mexican director Chano Urueta filmed El corsario negro, the first Spanish language adaptation. In 1976, Kabir Bedi and Carole André were reunited to portray The Black Corsair and Honorata in another Sergio Sollima adaptation of a Salgari classic, The Black Corsair. Urueta's and Sollima's films are available on DVD. In 1999 Mondo TV (Italy) created a 26-episode animated TV series "The Black Corsair".

== Trivia ==
In the late 19th century Emilio Salgari was Italy's foremost writer of adventure novels. He was knighted in 1897 in recognition for his work. The Black Corsair, the Chevalier Emilio, is named after himself. He also pays tribute to the House of Savoy, Italy's Royal family to show his gratitude. Yolanda, the Black Corsair's daughter is named after Princess Yolanda of Savoy.

Salgari used Geschichte der Filibustier. The History of the Pirates, Free-Booters, or Buccaneers of America. by Johann Wilhelm von Archenholz as one of his main references. The attack on Vera Cruz is based on true events as are the biographies of the pirates that appear in the novel.

== See also ==
Novels in the Sandokan series:

- The Mystery of the Black Jungle
- The Tigers of Mompracem
- The Pirates of Malaysia
- The Two Tigers
- The King of the Sea
- Quest for a Throne

Novels in The Black Corsair series:

- The Black Corsair
- The Queen of the Caribbean
- Yolanda, the Black Corsair's Daughter
- Son of the Red Corsair

Novels in Captain Tempesta series

- Captain Tempesta
- The Lion of Damascus
