= The Mystery of the Black Jungle =

1895 book by Emilio Salgari

- English Cover
- Author: Emilio Salgari
- Original title: I misteri della jungla nera
- Translator: Nico Lorenzutti
- Language: English, Original: Italian
- Series: The Sandokan Series
- Genre: Adventure fiction Young adult literature
- Publisher: ROH Press (first English translation); Donath (first Italian publisher)
- Publication date: English 2008, Italian 1895
- Publication place: Italy
- Media type: Paperback, Ebook
- Pages: 286
- ISBN: 978-0978270711
- Preceded by: The Tigers of Mompracem
- Followed by: The Pirates of Malaysia

The Mystery of the Black Jungle (Italian: I misteri della jungla nera) is an exotic adventure novel written by Italian author Emilio Salgari, published in 1895. It features two of his most well-known characters, the hunter Tremal-Naik and his loyal servant Kammamuri, and introduces his most famous character, Sandokan, the Tiger of Malaysia.

== Plot summary ==
Few can live in the Black Jungle of the Sundarbans, the islands formed by the delta of the Ganges river in India, a desolate, silent place teeming with wild dangerous beasts. Yet it is among its dark forests and bamboo groves here that the renowned snake and tiger hunter Tremal-Naik makes his home. For years he has lived there in peace until one night in the deep of the jungle a strange apparition stands before him - a beautiful young woman that vanishes in an instant. Within days, strange music is heard in the jungle, then one of his men is found dead without a mark upon his body. Determined to find some answers, the hunter sets off with his faithful servant Kammamuri, but as they head deeper into the jungles of the Sundarbans, they soon find their own lives at risk: a deadly new foe has been watching their every move, a foe that threatens all of British India. Tremal-Naik encounters the young woman, whose name is Ada, again in a temple in the jungle, and he's caught by fever, as his never-trembling heart is caught by love for her, right at the time when she seems to be facing her doom. Ada is there captured by thugs, worshippers of the goddess Kali.

== Characters ==
- Tremal-Naik: The tiger hunter.
- Kammamuri: Tremal-Naik's friend and ever-loyal servant
- Aghur: Another of Tremal-Naik's servants
- Ada Corishant: The Priestess of the Eastern Temple
- Suyodhana: The leader of the Thugs of the Kali cult, also known as The Son of the Sacred Waters of the Ganges
- Captain Macpherson: Ada's father. Enemy of the thugs
- Bharata: A sepoy soldier serving under Captain Macpherson
- Manciadi: A Thug
- Negapatnan: A Thug leader
- Vindhya: A Thug who poses as an ascetic.
- Nagor
- Nimpor: A Thug who poses as an ascetic.
- Hider: A Thug

== Film versions ==
There have been several big screen adaptations of the novel including The Mystery of The Black Jungle filmed in 1953 starring Lex Barker. The sequel, The Black Devils of Kali came out the subsequent year. It was later remade in 1965 as The Mystery of Thug Island. In the 1990s it returned to the small screen in Italy as The Mysteries of the Dark Jungle, a popular miniseries. Actor Kabir Bedi, who has portrayed popular Salgari characters Sandokan and The Black Corsair appeared as Tremal-Naik's loyal servant Kammamuri.

== See also ==
- Sandokan series
- Sandokan
- The Tigers of Mompracem
- The Pirates of Malaysia
- The Two Tigers
- The King of the Sea
- Quest for a Throne
- The Black Corsair
- The Queen of the Caribbean
- Son of the Red Corsair
