= The King of the Sea =

1906 novel by Emilio Salgari

- English Cover
- Author: Emilio Salgari
- Original title: Il re del mare
- Translator: Nico Lorenzutti
- Language: English, Original: Italian
- Genre: Adventure fiction Young adult literature
- Publisher: ROH Press (first English translation); Donath (first Italian publisher)
- Publication date: English 2009; Italian 1906
- Publication place: Italy
- Media type: Paperback, Ebook
- ISBN: 978-0978270759
- Preceded by: The Two Tigers
- Followed by: Quest for a Throne

The King of the Sea (original title: Il re del mare) is an exotic adventure novel written by Italian author Emilio Salgari, published in 1906. It features his most famous character, Sandokan.

== Plot introduction ==
Malaysia, 1868. A mysterious figure has armed the Dyaks and led them into battle against Tremal-Naik. Yanez De Gomera races to the rescue but soon learns that Sandokan and his Tigers are also under threat. Despite eleven years of peace, the new Rajah of Sarawak, James Brooke's nephew, has ordered the pirates to leave their island home or face all out war. Is this the end for the Tigers of Mompracem?

== See also ==
Novels in the Sandokan Series:

- The Mystery of the Black Jungle
- The Tigers of Mompracem
- The Pirates of Malaysia
- The Two Tigers
- Quest for a Throne

Novels in The Black Corsair series

- The Black Corsair
- The Queen of the Caribbean
- Son of the Red Corsair
