= Quest for a Throne =

1907 novel by Emilio Salgari

- First English Cover
- Author: Emilio Salgari
- Original title: Alla conquista di un impero
- Translator: Nico Lorenzutti
- Language: English (Italian original)
- Series: The Sandokan series
- Genre: Adventure fiction Young adult literature
- Publisher: ROH Press (first English translation); Donath (first Italian publisher)
- Publication date: English 2015; Italian 1907
- Publication place: Italy
- Media type: Paperback, Ebook
- Pages: 308
- ISBN: 978-0978270766
- Preceded by: The King of the Sea
- Followed by: Sandokan to the Rescue

Quest for a Throne (original title: Alla conquista di un impero) is an exotic adventure novel written by Italian author Emilio Salgari, published in 1907. It features his most famous character, Sandokan.

== Plot introduction ==
Sandokan and Yanez De Gomera travel to Assam to restore Surama to the throne of her ancestors. Aided by Tremal-Naik, Kammamuri and the Tigers of Mompracem, the Portuguese devises an ingenious plan to take the capital. However, all does not go as easily as planned for an expected adversary thwarts their every move: Teotokris, the rajah's favourite courtier, and a deadlier foe than any they have faced before.

== Sources ==
Emilio Salgari was an avid researcher and spent months reading and researching his exotic tales. The sources he used to pen this adventure include India and its Native Princes. Travels in Central India and in the Presidencies of Bombay and Bengal by Louis Rousselet, and Hindu Manners, Customs and Ceremonies by the Abbe Jean-Antoine Dubois.

== See also ==
Novels in the Sandokan Series:

- The Mystery of the Black Jungle
- The Tigers of Mompracem
- The Pirates of Malaysia
- The Two Tigers
- The King of the Sea

Novels in The Black Corsair series

- The Black Corsair
- The Queen of the Caribbean
- Son of the Red Corsair
