= Vitale De Stefano =

Italian actor and film director

- Born: Vitale Gioacchino De Stefano; 4 May 1889; Acireale, Sicily, Kingdom of Italy
- Died: 9 February 1959 (aged 69); Milan, Lombardia, Italy
- Other name: Vitale Di Stefano
- Occupations: Actor, Director
- Years active: 1909–1942

Vitale De Stefano (1889–1959) was an Italian actor and film director of the silent era. He played the role of Masinissa in Giovanni Pastrone's epic Cabiria in 1914.

== Selected filmography ==
- The Last Days of Pompeii (1913)
- Cabiria (1914)
- Paolina (1915)
- The Son of the Red Corsair (1921)
- The Black Panther (1942)

== Bibliography ==
- Jacqueline Reich. The Maciste Films of Italian Silent Cinema. Indiana University Press, 2015.
