= The Black Corsair =

1898 novel by Emilio Salgari

- Cover English Translation
- Author: Emilio Salgari
- Original title: Il corsaro nero
- Translator: Nico Lorenzutti
- Language: English, Original Italian
- Genre: Adventure fiction Young adult literature
- Publisher: ROH Press (first English translation); Donath (first Italian publisher)
- Publication date: English 2011, Italian 1898
- Publication place: Italy
- Media type: Paperback, Ebook
- Pages: 272
- Followed by: The Queen of the Caribbean

The Black Corsair is an 1898 adventure novel written by Italian novelist Emilio Salgari. Set in the Caribbean during the Golden Age of Piracy, the novel narrates the exploits of Emilio Roccanera, Lord of Ventimiglia and his attempts to avenge his brothers, slain by the Duke Van Guld, now Governor of Maracaibo. The Lord of Ventimiglia, known throughout the Spanish Main as the Black Corsair, allies himself with some of the greatest pirates and buccaneers of the era: François L'Ollonais, Michael the Basque and Henry Morgan, vowing never to rest until he attains his vengeance.

== Plot summary ==
Two pirates, Carmaux the French Basque and Van Stiller the Hamburger, are rescued by the Thunder, a pirate ship under the command of Emilio di Roccabruna of Roccanera, Lord of Valpenta and of Ventimiglia, and feared throughout the Caribbean as the Black Corsair. Once aboard, the two inform the captain that his younger brother the "Red Corsair" has been hanged by Duke van Guld, the Governor of Maracaibo. The Black Corsair decides to sneak into the city to retrieve his brother's body and give him an honourable burial at sea.

Carmaux and Van Stiller accompany the Corsair to the city, and aided by their Negro friend Moko, manage to steal the body. After a series of adventures the Corsair and his men return to the Thunder with the body. On the night the Corsair buries his brother, he vows to slay Van Guld and all those who bear his name.

En route to Tortuga, the pirates attack and capture a Spanish ship. They find a young noblewoman aboard, Honorata Willerman, the Duchess of Weltrendrem. She is taken captive to Tortuga where she is to await payment of her ransom. Struck by her beauty and spirit, the Corsair frees her and the two quickly fall in love.

The hunt for Governor Van Guld resumes and the Black Corsair and L'Ollonais lead an attack on Maracaibo. Unfortunately the governor escapes and the Black Corsair and his companions must track him through the jungles of Venezuela. There they encounter savage beasts, quick sand, and cannibal Arawaks. Van Guld proves elusive and to capture him the pirates must make an assault on the city of Gibraltar, Venezuela. They succeed in storming the city only to find out they are late: Van Guld has fled again.

Returning to the Thunder, a Spanish prisoner reveals accidentally this terrible truth, "Honorata Willerman" is really Honorata de Van Guld, Governor Van Guld's daughter! So the Black Corsair must kill her because he has sworn to kill all those bearing his hated enemy's name. Honorata is willing to accept her death, but the Corsair is not able to kill her in cold blood and instead he decides to maroon her on a fragile boat. While he sees his beloved Honorata drifting away on a fragile boat which can sink at any moment, the Corsair bursts into tears. "Look, Stiller, the Black Corsair is crying!" says a grieving Carmaux.

== Sequels ==
The quest for vengeance stretches over the course of several novels: The Queen of the Caribbean (La regina dei Caraibi), Honorata de Wan Guld, Yolanda, the Black Corsair's Daughter (Jolanda, la figlia del Corsaro Nero), The Son of the Red Corsair (Il figlio del corsaro rosso) and The Last Filibusters (Gli ultimi filibustieri).

== Film versions ==
There have been several film versions of the novel. In the 1920s, director Vitale Di Stefano first brought the Corsair trilogy to the screen with a series of silent films. In 1937, Amleto Palermi directed the first remake of Il corsaro nero and Italian fencing champion Ciro Verratti was cast to play the Black Corsair. In 1944, Mexican director Chano Urueta filmed El corsario negro, the first Spanish language adaptation. In 1976, Kabir Bedi and Carole André were reunited to portray The Black Corsair and Honorata in another Sergio Sollima adaptation of a Salgari classic, The Black Corsair. Urueta's and Sollima's films are available on DVD. In 1999 Mondo TV (Italy) created a 26-episode animated TV series "The Black Corsair".

== Legacy ==
In the late 19th century Emilio Salgari was Italy's foremost writer of adventure novels. He was knighted in 1897 in recognition for his work. The Black Corsair, the Chevalier Emilio, is named after himself. He also pays tribute to the House of Savoy, Italy's Royal family to show his gratitude. Yolanda, the Black Corsair's daughter is named after Princess Yolanda of Savoy.

Salgari used A History of The Buccaneers of America by Alexandre Exquemelin as one of his main references. Van Guld, the Governor of Maracaibo, is based on the real life Governor of Mérida. The attacks on Maracaibo and Gibraltar are based on true events, in particular Henry Morgan's raid on Lake Maracaibo, as are the biographies of the pirates that appear in the novel.

Il Corsaro Nero sold 80,000 copies in its first printing, a record in Italy at the time.

The book in included in the list of 1001 Children's Books You Must Read Before You Grow Up by Julia Eccleshare (Universe/Rizzoli International, 2009).

== See also ==
Novels in the Sandokan series:

- The Mystery of the Black Jungle
- The Tigers of Mompracem
- The Pirates of Malaysia
- The Two Tigers
- The King of the Sea
- Quest for a Throne

Novels in The Black Corsair series:

- The Black Corsair
- The Queen of the Caribbean
- Son of the Red Corsair

Captain Tempesta novels:

- Captain Tempesta
- The Lion of Damascus
