= El corsario negro =

El Corsario Negro
- Italian poster
- Directed by: Chano Urueta
- Screenplay by: Antonio Momplet
- Based on: The Black Corsair by Emilio Salgari
- Starring: Pedro Armendariz; June Marlowe
- Release date: 1944
- Country: Mexico
- Language: Spanish

El Corsario Negro ("The Black Corsair") is a 1944 Mexican film of the Golden Age of Mexican cinema. It was directed by Chano Urueta and stars Pedro Armendariz, José Baviera, June Marlowe, (Note: Martha Black, not Gisela Goetten.) and Maria Luisa Zea. The film is based on the 1898 adventure novel The Black Corsair by Emilio Salgari. It is the story of a seventeenth-century pirate (Pedro Armendariz) who declares a ceaseless war against the injustice of a cruel governor (José Baviera) of Maracaibo. In the course of his struggle, he finds the love of a beautiful maiden (June Marlowe), and loses his childhood friend (Maria Luisa Zea).

The film was a major production that gained popularity with audiences in Mexico and Latin America, but received negative reviews from critics.

It is in the public domain in both Mexico and the United States.
