= The Son of the Red Corsair (1943 film) =

1943 film

- Directed by: Marco Elter
- Written by: Sergio Amidei; Alberto Consiglio; Umberto De Franciscis; Pietro Germi; Antonio Leonviola; Camillo Mariani Dell'Aguillara; Renato May
- Based on: The Son of the Red Corsair by Emilio Salgari
- Starring: Vittorio Sanipoli; Luisa Ferida; Memo Benassi
- Cinematography: Giorgio Orsini; Giovanni Vitrotti
- Edited by: Renato May
- Music by: Ezio Carabella
- Production company: Bellamacina Cuffaro Film
- Distributed by: Variety Distribution
- Release date: January 1943
- Running time: 80 minutes
- Country: Italy
- Language: Italian

The Son of the Red Corsair (Italian: Il figlio del corsaro rosso) is a 1943 Italian historical adventure film directed by Marco Elter and starring Vittorio Sanipoli, Luisa Ferida and Memo Benassi. It is an adaptation of the 1908 novel The Son of the Red Corsair by Emilio Salgari. It was shot at Cinecittà Studios in Rome. The film's sets were designed by the art director Gino Morici.

== Cast ==
- Vittorio Sanipoli as Enrico di Ventimiglia
- Luisa Ferida as Carmen
- Memo Benassi as Il marchese di Montelimar
- Loredana as Neala
- Pina Renzi as Panchita
- Aldo Silvani as Don Barrejo de la Tuelva
- Idolo Tancredi as Un corsaro
- Domenico Viglione Borghese as Un corsaro
- Felice Minotti as Un corsaro

== Bibliography ==
- Goble, Alan. The Complete Index to Literary Sources in Film. Walter de Gruyter, 1999.
