= The Son of the Red Corsair (novel) =

1908 novel by Emilio Salgari

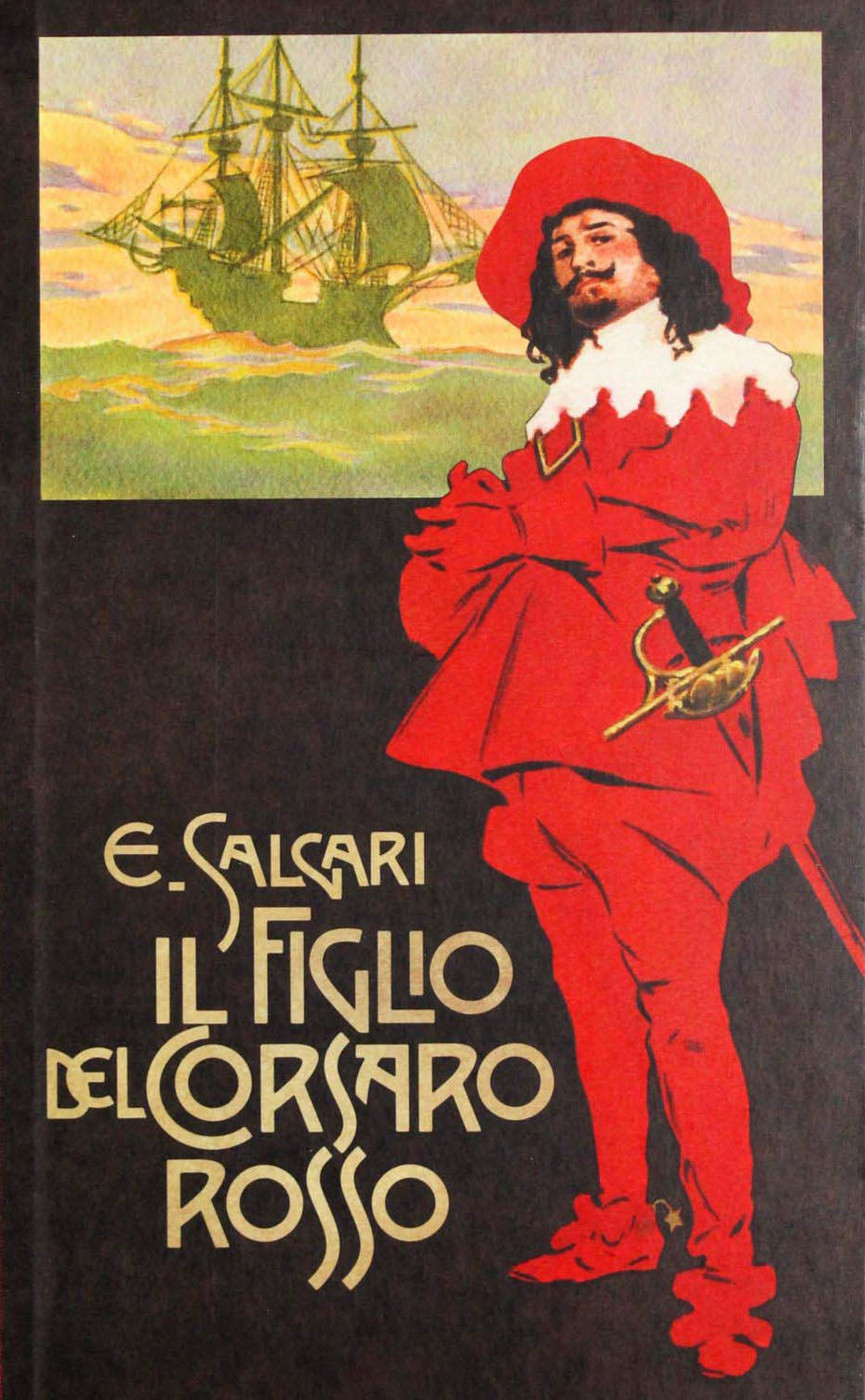
- First edition cover
- Author: Emilio Salgari
- Original title: Il figlio del corsaro rosso
- Translator: Michael Amadio
- Language: Italian
- Genre: Adventure novel
- Publisher: Donath
- Publication date: 1908
- Publication place: Italy
- Media type: Print (hardback)
- Preceded by: Yolanda, the Black Corsair's Daughter
- Followed by: The Last Pirates

The Son of the Red Corsair (original title: Il figlio del corsaro rosso) is an exotic adventure novel written by Italian author Emilio Salgari, published in 1908. Amidst many film versions, the novel was adapted for the silver screen in Italy in 1959.

== Plot summary ==
The Son of the Red Corsair is a mixture of adventure, humor, and romance. Part of the series usually referred to as Pirati delle Antille, it is the story of Enrico di Ventimiglia, the Son of the Red Corsair, as he travels through the Spanish conquests of Central America in search of the stepsister he has never met. In his adventure, the Count is helped by the faithful Mendoza, the incomparable Don Barrejo, Buttafuoco, a nobleman-turned-buccaneer, and bands of pirates of the Caribbean.

== Film adaptations ==
The first version was a silent film The Son of the Red Corsair in 1921. In 1943 a sound adaptation The Son of the Red Corsair followed by The Son of the Red Corsair (1959) was directed by Primo Zeglio and starred Lex Barker as Enrico and Sylvia Lopez as Carmen. The English-language version of the film was released in the UK in 1962, and released in the US (where it was also known as The Son of the Red Pirate) in 1963.

== See also ==
- The Black Corsair
- The Queen of the Caribbean
- Sandokan series
- The Mystery of the Black Jungle
- The Tigers of Mompracem
- The Pirates of Malaysia
- The Two Tigers
- The King of the Sea
- Quest for a Throne
