= The Pirates of Malaysia =

2007 novel by Emilio Salgari

- First English Cover
- Author: Emilio Salgari
- Original title: I pirati della Malesia
- Translator: Nico Lorenzutti
- Language: English, Original: Italian
- Series: The Sandokan Series
- Genre: Adventure fiction Young adult literature
- Publisher: ROH Press (first English translation); Donath (first Italian publisher)
- Publication date: English 2007; Italian 1896
- Publication place: Italy
- Media type: Paperback, Ebook
- Pages: 260
- ISBN: 978-0978270735
- Preceded by: The Tigers of Mompracem
- Followed by: The Two Tigers

The Pirates of Malaysia (Italian: I pirati della Malesia) is an exotic adventure novel written by Italian author Emilio Salgari, published in 1896. It features his most famous character, Sandokan, and is a sequel to The Tigers of Mompracem.

== Synopsis ==
Sandokan and Yanez De Gomera, the protagonists of The Tigers of Mompracem, are back, righting injustices and fighting old foes. Tremal-Naik's misfortunes have continued. Wrongfully imprisoned, the great hunter has been banished from India and sentenced to life in a penal colony. Knowing his master is innocent, Kammamuri dashes off to the rescue, planning to free the good hunter at the first opportunity. When the good servant is captured by the Tigers of Mompracem, he manages to enlist their services. But in order to succeed, Sandokan and Yanez must lead their men against the forces of James Brooke, "The Exterminator", the dreaded White Rajah of Sarawak.

== Sources ==
Salgari used as a source the book A Visit to the Indian Archipelago in H.M. Ship Maeander: With Portions of the Private Journal of Sir James Brooke, K.C.B. by Henry Keppel. Pangeran Macota, Sandokan's ally, was in fact one of James Brooke's bitterest enemies.

== See also ==
Novels in the Sandokan Series:

- The Mystery of the Black Jungle
- The Tigers of Mompracem
- The Two Tigers
- The King of the Sea
- Quest for a Throne

Novels in The Black Corsair series

- The Black Corsair
- The Queen of the Caribbean
- Son of the Red Corsair
