= Emilio Salgari =

Italian writer (1862–1911)

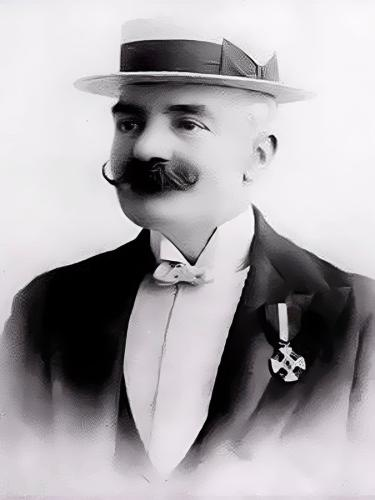
- Born: 21 August 1862; Verona, Lombardy–Venetia
- Died: 25 April 1911 (aged 48); Turin, Kingdom of Italy
- Occupations: Journalist, writer, novelist
- Spouse: Ida Peruzzi (m. 1892)
- Children: 4
- Writing career
- Genres: Adventure, Westerns, Historical fiction, Science fiction
- Notable works: Sandokan, The Tigers of Mompracem (series), The Black Corsair (series)

Signature
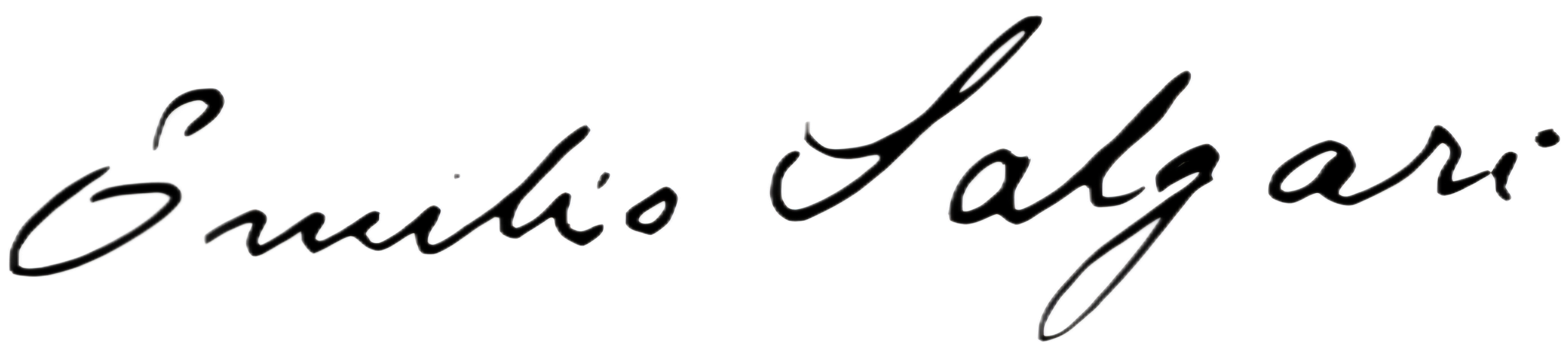

Emilio Salgari (Italian pronunciation: [eˈmiːljo salˈɡaːri], but often erroneously pronounced [ˈsalɡari]; 21 August 1862 – 25 April 1911) was an Italian writer of action adventure swashbucklers and a pioneer of science fiction.

In Italy, his extensive body of work was more widely read than that of Dante Alighieri. In the 21st century, he is still among the 40 most translated Italian authors, although almost none of his oeuvre appeared in English translations during his lifetime and have only begun to appear recently in the English language. Many of his most popular novels have been adapted as comics, animated series and feature films. He is considered the father of Italian adventure fiction and Italian pop culture, and the "grandfather" of the Spaghetti Western.

== Life ==
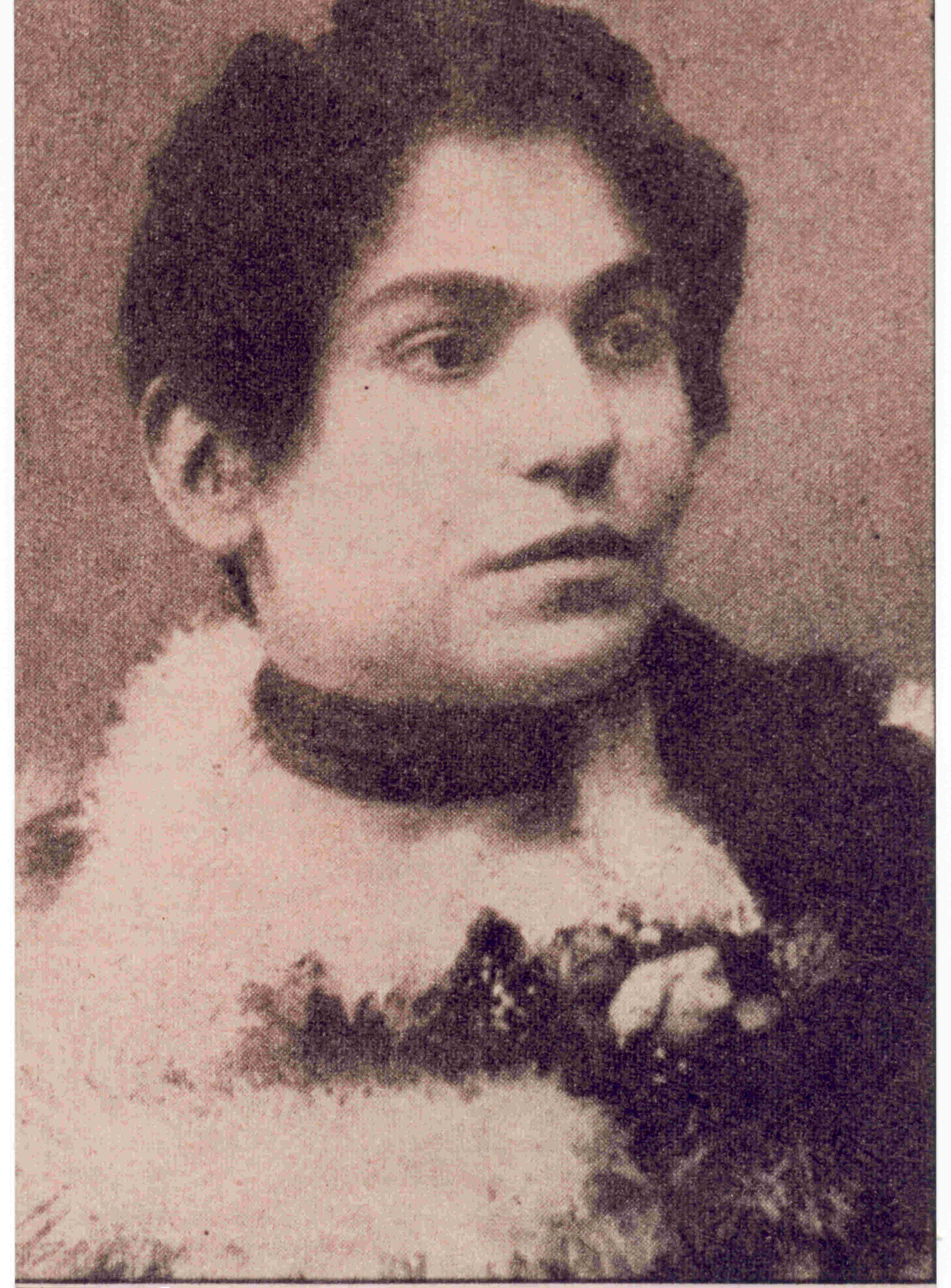
Ida Peruzzi, wife of Salgari

Emilio Salgari was born in Verona to a family of modest merchants. From a young age, he had the desire to explore the seas; he studied seamanship at a nautical technical institution in Venice, but his academic performance was too poor, and he never graduated.

He began his writing career as a reporter for the daily La Nuova Arena, which published some of his work as serials. There, under the pseudonym Emilius, he wrote theatre reviews covering operas, operettas, ballets, and dramatic performances.. As his powers of narration grew, so did his reputation for having lived a life of adventure. He claimed to have explored the Sudan desert, met Buffalo Bill in Nebraska (he had actually met him during his "Wild West Show" tour of Italy), and sailed the Seven Seas. His early biographies were filled with adventurous tales set in the Far East, events which he claimed were the basis for much of his work. Salgari had actually never ventured farther than the Adriatic Sea.

He turned his passion for exploration and discovery to writing. His first stories were serialized in newspapers. Early in his career, he began signing his tales as "Captain Salgari", a title he once defended in a duel when his claim to it was questioned.

Though knighted by the Queen of Italy and wildly popular, Salgari did not earn much money from his books and lived hand to mouth for most of his life.

In 1892, Salgari married Ida Peruzzi – nicknamed "Aida," with whom he was very happy for years. The couple had four children. Salgari's private life was clouded by several tragedies. In 1889 his father committed suicide. Ida became ill after 1903 and Salgari's struggling increased with her medical bills.

These events led Salgari to depression, and he attempted suicide in 1910. After Ida was committed to a mental ward in 1911, Salgari was overwhelmed and took his own life on 25 April 1911, imitating the Japanese ritual of seppuku. He left three letters, addressed to his and Ida's children, his publisher, and the editors of his newspaper in Turin. The letter to his publisher said:

To you that have grown rich from the sweat of my brow while keeping myself and my family in misery, I ask only that from those profits you find the funds to pay for my funeral. I salute you while I break my pen. Emilio Salgari.

Two of the sons of Emilio and Aida also committed suicide, Romero in 1933 and Omar, an adventure writer himself, in 1963. His daughter Fatima died of tuberculosis in 1914, while his remaining son Nadir died in a motorcycle accident in 1936. His wife died in the mental ward in 1922.

== Writing career ==
Salgari wrote more than 200 adventure stories and novels, setting his tales in exotic locations, with heroes from a wide variety of cultures. He gained inspiration from reading foreign literature and newspapers, travel magazines and encyclopedias, which he used to portray his heroes' worlds. He wrote four major series: The Pirates of Malaysia; The Black Corsair Saga; The Pirates of Bermuda; and a collection of adventures set in the Old West. Salgari's heroes were mostly pirates, outlaws and barbarians, fighting against greed, abuse of power, and corruption.

His most famous heroes Sandokan, The Tiger of Malaysia, a Bornean prince turned pirate, and his loyal Portuguese lieutenant Yanez de Gomera, led their men in attacks against the Dutch and British fleets. They declared war on James Brooke, the White Rajah of Sarawak, and tried to force him from his throne. The Black Corsair and Captain Morgan maintained a chivalric code in the Caribbean, while Salgari's pirates of Bermuda fought for American independence.

His tales had been so popular that soon his publisher hired other writers to develop adventure stories under his name. They added 50 novels to his "canon". Salgari's style was imitated by many, but no other Italian adventure writer managed to duplicate his popular success.

He also published numerous minor works, among which is Il Brick Maledetto (Milano, Sonzogno, 1936) published posthumously.

== Legacy ==
Salgari's work was imitated in one form or another by many who came after him. A large part of the Italian adventure literature is a continuation of Salgari's work. Many late 19th century writers such as Luigi Motta and Emilio Fancelli wrote further Sandokan adventures imitating Salgari's style: fast-paced, filled with great battles, blood, violence and punctuated with humour.

The style soon spread to films and television. One example is the work of the director Sergio Leone, whose outlaw heroes in his Spaghetti Westerns were inspired by Salgari's piratical adventurers. More than 50 film adaptations have been made of Salgari's novels, and many more were inspired by his work (corsair stories, jungle adventure stories, and swashbuckling B movies, such as Morgan, the Pirate, starring Steve Reeves).

Federico Fellini loved Salgari's books. Pietro Mascagni had over 50 Salgari titles in his library. Umberto Eco read Salgari's works as a child.

His work was very popular in Portugal, Spain and Spanish-speaking countries, where Latin American writers such as Gabriel García Márquez, Isabel Allende, Carlos Fuentes, Jorge Luis Borges and Pablo Neruda, all attested to reading him when young. Che Guevara read 62 of his books, according to his biographer Paco Ignacio Taibo II, who remarked that the revolutionary's anti-imperialism could be seen to be "Salgarian in origin".

Though popular with the masses, Salgari was shunned by critics throughout his life and for most of the 20th century. It was not until the late 1990s that his writings began to be revisited, and new translations appeared in print. They have been newly appreciated for their characterization and plots. In 2001 the first National Salgari Association was founded in Italy to celebrate his work. His life is the subject of the 2012 comic book Sweet Salgari by Paolo Bacilieri.

== Film adaptations of Salgari novels ==
Historians debate the first film adaptation of a Salgari novel. Cabiria, directed by Giovanni Pastrone bears many similarities to Emilio Salgari's 1908 adventure novel Cartagine in Fiamme (Carthage is Burning). Salgari was never credited, and Gabriele D'Annunzio was billed as the official screenwriter. D'Annunzio had been brought on board to help revise the film once it had been shot, earning the credit by changing the title to Cabiria, changing the name of some of the characters, and rewriting the captions from what Pastrone had done. The three-hour epic movie with its cast of thousands created a sensation throughout Italy. It pioneered epic screen production and foreshadowed the work of D.W. Griffith, Sergei Eisenstein and others.

Vitale De Stefano brought Salgari's pirates to the big screen in the early 1920s with a series of five films shot over two years, including Il corsaro nero The Black Corsair and La Regina dei caraibi (The Queen of the Caribbean). Lex Barker appeared as the tiger hunter Tremal-Naik in the 1955 B-movie The Mystery of The Black Jungle. Sandokan was played by Hercules star Steve Reeves in Sandokan the Great and The Pirates of Malaysia aka The Pirates of The Seven Seas. Ray Danton played the pirate in Luigi Capuano's Sandokan Against the Leopard of Sarawak (aka Throne of Vengeance.) and later reprised the role in Sandokan Fights Back (aka The Conqueror and the Empress).

The 1944 Mexican film El corsario negro is based on his novel The Black Corsair.

The 1965 adventure film La montagna di luce (The Mountain of Light) was loosely based on Salgari's 1902 novel of the same title, which referred to the name of the Koh-i-Noor diamond. The film was released in English under several titles, the most commonly known of which was Jungle Adventurer. One of the alternate titles used for a later re-release was Sandok, an attempt to capitalize on the popularity of Salgari's fictional pirate Sandokan, even though neither the novel, nor the film had anything to do with Sandokan's character or the settings of his adventures (the plot revolved around a fictitious attempt to steal the Koh-i-Noor, and took place in 19th-century India).

In 1976, the landmark Sandokan TV miniseries played throughout Europe. It starred Kabir Bedi in the title role and attracted more than 80 million viewers a week. Bedi has been considered the quintessential Sandokan ever since. He later reprised the role in the late 1990s in a series of sequels.

Massimo de Rita and Lucio Mandara collaborated on a story for the 1988 TV miniseries The Secret of Sahara which was loosely based on Salgari's works.

Sandokan (2025) is a new series currently on Netflix.

== Publishers ==
Salgari's works have been published by numerous publishing houses worldwide. These include: Donath, Viglongo, Carroccio, RCS MediaGroup, and Mondadori in Italian; Saturnino Calleja, Editorial Porrúa (Colección Sepan Cuantos) and Ediciones Gaviota in Spanish; Editora Illuminuras in Portuguese; Bouquins in French; ABLIT Verlag in German; and ROH Press in English. ROH Press has been republishing the novels in Italian, with their translations into English and Spanish.

== Work available in English ==
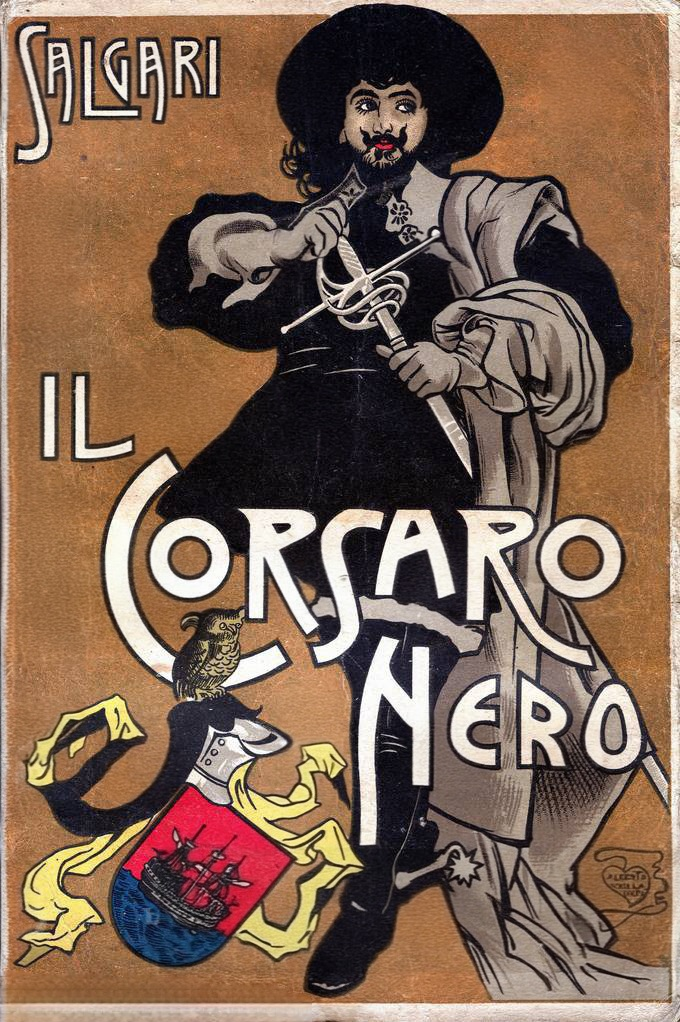
Cover of Il corsaro nero, third edition 1904, illustration by Alberto della Valle

Though Salgari's novels have been popular in Europe and Latin America for over a century, at present only nine titles are available in English, published by ROH Press.

=== The Tigers of Malaysia series ===
- The Mystery of the Black Jungle
- Sandokan: The Tigers of Mompracem
- Sandokan: The Pirates of Malaysia
- Sandokan: The Two Tigers
- Sandokan: The King of the Sea
- Sandokan: Quest for a Throne

=== The Black Corsair series ===
- The Black Corsair
- The Queen of the Caribbean

==== Captain Tempesta ====
- Captain Tempesta

== Bibliography ==
=== The Sandokan series ===
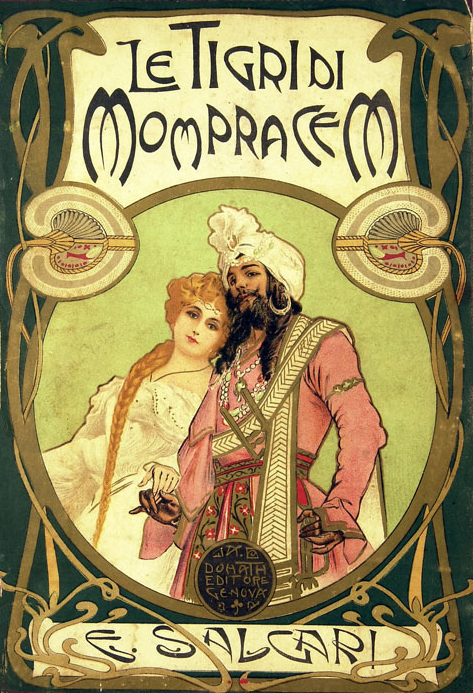
Le tigri di Mompracem, 1900, cover illustration by Alberto della Valle

- The Mystery of the Black Jungle (I Misteri della Jungla Nera, 1895)
- The Tigers of Mompracem (Le tigri di Mompracem, 1900)
- The Pirates of Malaysia (I pirati della Malesia, 1896)
- The Two Tigers (Le due Tigri, 1904)
- The King of the Sea (Il re del mare, 1906)
- Quest for a Throne (Alla conquista di un impero, 1907)
- Sandokan to the Rescue (Sandokan alla riscossa, 1907)
- Return to Mompracem (La riconquista di Mompracem, 1908)
- The Brahman (Il Bramino dell’Assam, 1911)
- An Empire Crumbles (La caduta di un impero, 1911)
- Yanez’ Revenge (La rivincita di Yanez, 1913)

The last three titles were published posthumously.

=== The Black Corsair series ===
- The Black Corsair (Il Corsaro Nero, 1898)
- The Queen of the Caribbean (La regina dei Caraibi, 1901)
- Yolanda, the Black Corsair's Daughter (Jolanda, la figlia del Corsaro Nero, 1905)
- The Son of the Red Corsair (Il figlio del Corsaro Rosso, 1908)
- The Last Pirates (Gli ultimi filibustieri, 1908)

=== The Pirates of Bermuda series ===
- I corsari delle Bermude (1909)
- La crociera della Tuonante (1910)
- Straordinarie avventure di Testa di Pietra (1915)

=== Adventures in the Old West series ===
- Sulle frontiere del Far-West (1908)
- La scotennatrice (1909)
- Le selve ardenti (1910)

=== Other series ===
==== Two sailors ====
- Il Tesoro del Presidente del Paraguay (1894)
- Il Continente Misterioso (1894)

==== Il Fiore delle Perle ====
- Le stragi delle Filippine (1897)
- Il Fiore delle Perle (1901)

==== I figli dell'aria ====
- I Figli dell'Aria (1904)
- Il Re dell'Aria (1907)

==== Captain Tempesta ====
- Captain Tempesta (Capitan Tempesta, 1905)
- The Lion of Damascus (Il Leone di Damasco, 1910)

==== Short stories ====
- I racconti della Bibliotechina aurea illustrata (1900–1906)
- Le novelle marinaresche di Mastro Catrame (1894)
- Le grandi pesche nei mari australi (1904)
- Il Brick Maledetto (Milano, Sonzogno, 1936) published posthumously.

==== Adventure anthology ====
Excerpts from 15 of Salgari's titles were collected in Storie Rosse in 1910. Each excerpt is introduced by a brief synopsis of the novel it was drawn from.

== Other adventures ==
=== Adventures set in India and Asia ===
- I naufragatori dell'Oregon (1896)
- La rosa del Dong-Giang (1897; also known as: Tay-See)
- Il capitano della Djumna (1897)
- Sul mare delle perle (1903)
- La città del re lebbroso (1904)
- La gemma del fiume rosso (1904)
- La Perla Sanguinosa (1905)

=== Adventures set in Africa ===
- I drammi della schiavitù (1896)
- La Costa d'Avorio (1898)
- Le caverne dei diamanti (1899)
- Le avventure di un marinaio in Africa (1899)
- La giraffa bianca (1902)
- La montagna d'oro (1901; also known as: Il treno volante)

=== Adventures set in the desert and the Middle East ===
- Il re della montagna (1895)
- I predoni del Sahara (1903)
- I briganti del Riff (1911)
- I predoni del gran deserto (1911)

=== Tales of lost cities and great treasures ===
- La scimitarra di Budda (1892)
- La città dell'oro (1898)
- Duemila leghe sotto l'America (1888) (also known as Il tesoro misterioso)
- La montagna di luce (1902)
- Il tesoro della montagna azzurra (1907)

=== Adventures set in Russia ===
- Gli orrori della Siberia (1900)
- L'eroina di Port Arthur (1904, also known as La Naufragatrice)
- Le aquile della steppa (1907)

=== Adventures set in the Old West ===
- Il re della Prateria (1896)
- Il figlio del cacciatore d'orsi (1899)
- Avventure fra le pellirosse (1900)
- La sovrana del campo d'oro (1905)

=== Adventures set in the lands of ice and snow ===
- Nel paese dei ghiacci (1896)
- Al Polo Australe in velocipede (1895)
- Al Polo Nord (1898)
- La Stella Polare e il suo viaggio avventuroso (1901; also known as: Verso l'Artide con la Stella Polare)
- La Stella dell'Araucania (1906)
- Una sfida al Polo (1909)

=== Historical Adventures ===
- Le pantere di Algeri (1903)
- Le figlie dei Faraoni (1905)
- Cartagine in fiamme (1908)

=== Survival stories ===
- I pescatori di balene (1894)
- I Robinson italiani (1896)
- Attraverso l'Atlantico in pallone (1896)
- I minatori dell'Alaska (1900)
- L'uomo di fuoco (1904)
- Il vampiro della foresta (1912)

=== Adventures on the High Seas ===
- Un dramma nell'Oceano Pacifico (1895)
- I naufraghi del Poplador (1895)
- I pescatori di Trepang (1896)
- Gli scorridori del mare (1900)
- I solitari dell'Oceano (1904)
- Sull'Atlante (1907)

=== Adventures set during times of war and revolution ===
- La favorita del Mahdi (1887)
- La capitana del Yucatan (1899)
- Le stragi della China (1901; also known as: Il sotterraneo della morte)

=== Adventures set in Italy ===
- I naviganti della Meloria (1902)

=== Adventures involving time travel ===
- Le meraviglie del Duemila (1907)

=== Autobiographical ===
- La Bohème italiana (1909)

== Bibliography ==
- "Emilio Salgari", ROH Press, in English. Also includes images from movies and animated series based on his novels.
- "Emilio Salgari: Literature’s Invisible Man", ROH Press, in English.
- Read a review of the Sandokan series. Cindy Vallar, reviewer, (2010) Archived 2012-02-08 at the Wayback Machine
- Lucas, A. (2002). "Salgari, Emilio". The Oxford Companion to Italian Literature. Oxford University Press. ISBN 978-0-19-818332-7.
- Braccesi, Lorenzo (2005). "Salgari e l'antico" [Salgari and the Ancient]. Studi Storici. 46 (4): 955–965. JSTOR 20567328.
- Nalesini, Oscar (2009). L'Asia Sud-orientale nella cultura italiana. Bibliografia analitica ragionata, 1475–2005 [Southeast Asia in Italian Culture. An Annotated Analytical Bibliography, 1475–2005]. Rome: IsIAO. pp. 350–362. ISBN 978-88-6323-284-4.
- Passino, Carla (December 2009). "Book of the Week: Sandokan, the Tigers of Mompracem". Italy Magazine. Archived from the original on 17 January 2011.
- Verdenelli, Marcello (2011). "Circumnavigazione critica dell'isola Salgari" [A Critical circumnavigation of Salgari Island]. Rivista di letteratura italiana. XXIX (2/3): 35–47. doi:10.1400/174075.
- Hahn, D. (2015). "SALGARI, Emilio". The Oxford Companion to Children's Literature. Oxford University Press.
- Lawson Lucas, Ann (2021). Emilio Salgari. Una mitologia moderna tra letteratura, politica, società [Emilio Salgari. A Modern Mythology of Literature, Politics, and Society]. 4 vols. Florence: Casa Editrice Leo S. Olschki. ISBN 978-88-2226-790-0.
