= Sergio Leone filmography =

List of films that Sergio Leone has written, directed, produced, or acted in

Sergio Leone (3 January 1929 – 30 April 1989) was an Italian film director, producer and screenwriter.

== Filmography ==
Year	English title	Italian title	Director	Writer	Notes
1954	They Stole a Tram	Hanno rubato un tram	Uncredited	No	Selected scenes
1959	The Last Days of Pompeii	Gli ultimi giorni di Pompei	Uncredited	Yes	Selected scenes (Note: Mario Bonnard is the credited director. Leone served as assistant director and reportedly took over completion of the film when Bonnard became severely ill during production.)
1961	The Colossus of Rhodes	Il Colosso di Rodi	Yes	Yes	Directorial debut
1964	A Fistful of Dollars	Per un pugno di dollari	Yes	Yes	First part of the Dollars Trilogy
1965	For a Few Dollars More	Per qualche dollaro in più	Yes	Yes	Second part of the Dollars Trilogy
1966	The Good, the Bad and the Ugly	Il buono, il brutto, il cattivo	Yes	Yes	Third part of the Dollars Trilogy
1968	Once Upon a Time in the West	C'era una volta il West	Yes	Yes	First part of the Once Upon a Time Trilogy
1971	Duck, You Sucker! (Note: Also known as A Fistful of Dynamite and Once Upon a Time... the Revolution)	Giù la testa	Yes	Yes	Second part of the Once Upon a Time Trilogy
1984	Once Upon a Time in America	C'era una volta in America	Yes	Yes	Third part of the Once Upon a Time Trilogy

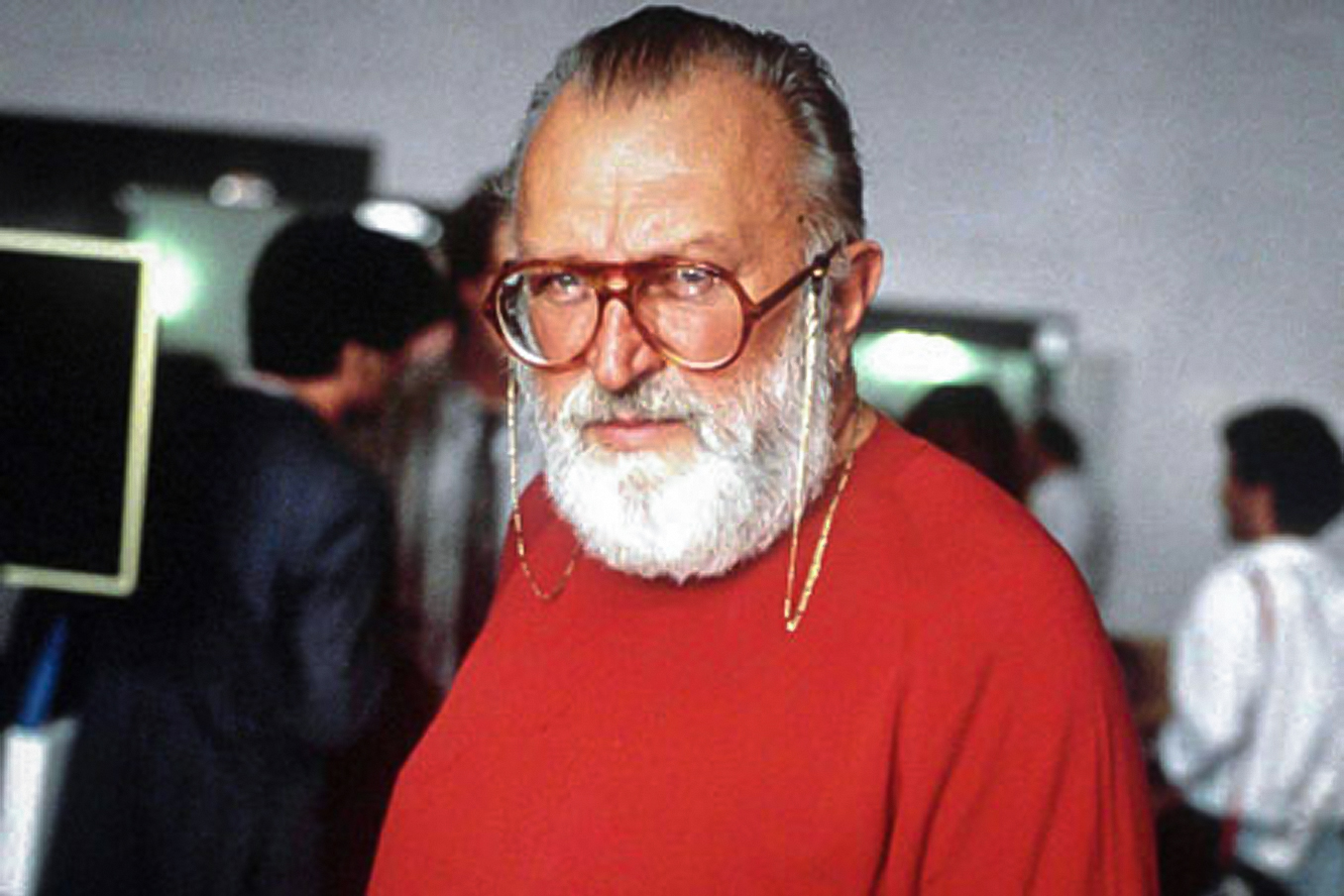
Sergio Leone

=== Assistant director ===
- Il trovatore (1949)
- La forza del destino (1949)
- Night Taxi (1950)
- The Vow (1950)
- Il Brigante Musolino (1950)
- The Three Pirates (1952)
- Jolanda, the Daughter of the Black Corsair (1952)
- The Mad Marechiaro (1952)
- Girls Marked Danger (1952)
- Man, Beast and Virtue (1953)
- Frine, Courtesan of Orient (1953)
- Tradita (1954)
- Of Life and Love (1954)
- La ladra (1955)
- Allow Me, Daddy! (1956)
- Il maestro... (1957)
- Slave Women of Corinth (1958)
- La legge mi incolpa (1959)
- The Son of the Red Corsair (1959)
- Sodom and Gomorrah (1962)

=== Second unit director ===
- Quo Vadis (1951) (uncredited)
- Helen of Troy (1956) (uncredited)
- Ben-Hur (1959) (uncredited)
- Cemetery Without Crosses (1969) (uncredited)
- My Name Is Nobody (1973) (uncredited)
- A Genius, Two Partners and a Dupe (1975) (director: opening scene - uncredited)

=== Screenwriter ===
- Slave Women of Corinth (1958)
- Sheba and the Gladiator (1959)
- The Seven Revenges (1961)
- Duel of the Titans (1961)
- Slave Girls of Sheba (1964)
- Troppo forte (1986)

=== Executive producer ===
- My Name Is Nobody (1973) (uncredited)
- A Genius, Two Partners and a Dupe (1975) (uncredited)
- The Cat (1977)
- A Dangerous Toy (1979) (uncredited)
- Troppo forte (1986) (uncredited)

=== Acting roles ===
- The Man on the Street (1941)
- Bicycle Thieves (1948) (uncredited)
- Milano miliardaria (1951) (uncredited)
- The Mad Marechiaro (1952)
- They Stole a Tram (1954)
- For a Few Dollars More (1965) (uncredited)
- An Almost Perfect Affair (1979) (uncredited)
- Sad Hill Unearthed (2017) (archive footage)
