= Nightmare in the Sun =

1965 film by John Derek, Marc Lawrence

- Original movie poster
- Directed by: Marc Lawrence
- Written by: Ted Thomas; Fanya Lawrence
- Story by: George Fass; Marc Lawrence
- Produced by: Marc Lawrence; John Derek; Douglas Stewart
- Starring: Ursula Andress; John Derek; Aldo Ray; Arthur O'Connell; Sammy Davis Jr. Keenan Wynn; Allyn Joslyn; Chick Chandler; Richard Jaeckel
- Cinematography: Stanley Cortez
- Edited by: Douglas Stewart; William Shenenberg
- Music by: Paul Glass
- Production company: Afilmco Productions
- Distributed by: Zodiac Films
- Release date: March 6, 1965
- Running time: 80 minutes
- Country: United States
- Language: English
- Budget: $250,000

Nightmare in the Sun is a 1965 drama film directed by Marc Lawrence in his feature theatrical directing debut. It stars Ursula Andress, John Derek, and Aldo Ray, with a cameo appearance by Sammy Davis Jr. and an early role of Robert Duvall.

== Plot ==
Beautiful young Marsha Wilson is married to Sam, a wealthy, jealous, much-older man. She is having an affair with the sheriff. Marsha picks up a handsome hitch-hiker one day, and brings him to husband's ranch and falls for him. Marsha wants to run off with the hitch-hiker, but he too is married and won't take her along. Sam returns home, discovers what happened and kills Marsha with a rifle in a jealous, drunken rage.

The town's sheriff concocts a scheme to blackmail Sam, promising to frame the hitch-hiker for Marsha's murder if Sam provides a hefty payment. The hitch-hiker is caught and jailed, escapes and then is recaptured. By then, a remorseful Sam has had enough. He kills the sheriff, then confesses to committing both murders.

== Cast ==
- Ursula Andress as Marsha Wilson
- John Derek as the Hitch-Hiker
- Aldo Ray as the Sheriff
- Arthur O'Connell as Sam Wilson
- Sammy Davis Jr. as Truck Driver
- Robert Duvall as Motorcyclist
- Richard Jaeckel as Motorcyclist
- Allyn Joslyn as Junk Dealer
- Keenan Wynn as Song and Dance Man
- Chick Chandler as Bartender

== Production ==
Marc Lawrence was best known as an actor, but he had moved into directing television. He helped come up with the original story, and his wife Fanya Foss co-wrote the screenplay. The movie was financed by Ricky du Pont, one of the very rich du Pont family. Du Pont wanted on screen credit but Lawrence refused, stating in a later interview that "I said, 'I can't. If all these guys knew the money came from a millionaire, they'd cut my throat. If I sell the picture and your name is on it, I won't get a penny for it'." However Hedda Hopper announced that Du Pont financed the film in her column in September 1963. Sammy Davis Jr. appeared in a cameo as a truck driver and was reportedly going to sing the title track, but it is not in the final film.

Filming started on 13 September 1963. The movie was filmed in and around Calabasas, California over 15 days. Several of the cast agreed to appear for less than their usual fees as a favor to Lawrence. Lawrence made John Derek a co-producer in order to arrange that his then-wife Ursula Andress would do a nude scene. He says this would be in the scene at the beginning "when Aldo Ray rapes her" (although in the final film the sex is consensual). "Derek promised to allow his wife Ursula to do a nude scene with Aldo Ray", Lawrence later wrote, "but the day before shooting he changed his mind. Years later he did a nude layout of Ursula for Playboy and got $15,000 for his art." du Pont hindered filming by insisting filming should be dictated by astrology.

After filming was completed, Lawrence assembled a rough cut which du Pont bought for $50,000. "When I got a $50,000 note to get out of the picture, they put in a nude scene", claimed Lawrence. He defaulted on his payments and release of the film was held up when Lawrence attempted to reclaim his money or ownership of the film. Lawrence only directed one more film, Daddy's Deadly Darling.

== Reception ==
FilmInk argued "Derek was showing his age by now – more a grey fox than pretty young thing – and he gives a decent performance and the movie is interesting."

== See also ==
- List of American films of 1965
