= Cleopatra (1934 film) =

1934 film by Cecil B. DeMille

- Directed by: Cecil B. DeMille
- Written by: Waldemar Young; Vincent Lawrence; Bartlett Cormack (adaptation: historical material)
- Produced by: Cecil B. DeMille
- Starring: Claudette Colbert; Warren William; Henry Wilcoxon
- Cinematography: Victor Milner
- Edited by: Anne Bauchens (uncredited)
- Music by: Rudolph G. Kopp; Milan Roder (uncredited)
- Distributed by: Paramount Pictures
- Release dates: August 16, 1934 (New York City, premiere); October 5, 1934 (US)
- Running time: 100 minutes
- Country: United States
- Language: English
- Budget: $842,908
- Box office: $1,929,161

Cleopatra is a 1934 American epic historical drama film produced and directed by Cecil B. DeMille and distributed by Paramount Pictures. A retelling of the story of the ancient Egyptian queen Cleopatra VII, the screenplay was written by Waldemar Young and Vincent Lawrence and was based on Bartlett Cormack's adaptation of historical material. Claudette Colbert stars as Cleopatra, Warren William as Julius Caesar, and Henry Wilcoxon as Mark Antony.

Pre-production began in July 1933 while DeMille was working on another film. A staff of twelve people, headed by screenwriter Jeanie MacPherson, spent eight months doing research. The production used 250,000 square feet of space for the sets and employed more than 5,000 actors, extras, and technicians. Principal photography was completed in two months.

Cleopatra premiered in New York City on August 16, 1934. Nominated for five Academy Awards, it was the first DeMille film to receive a nomination for Best Picture. Victor Milner won the Academy Award for Best Cinematography. It is the third and final film DeMille made with Colbert and the first one he made with Wilcoxon, who would later become DeMille's associate producer.

== Plot ==
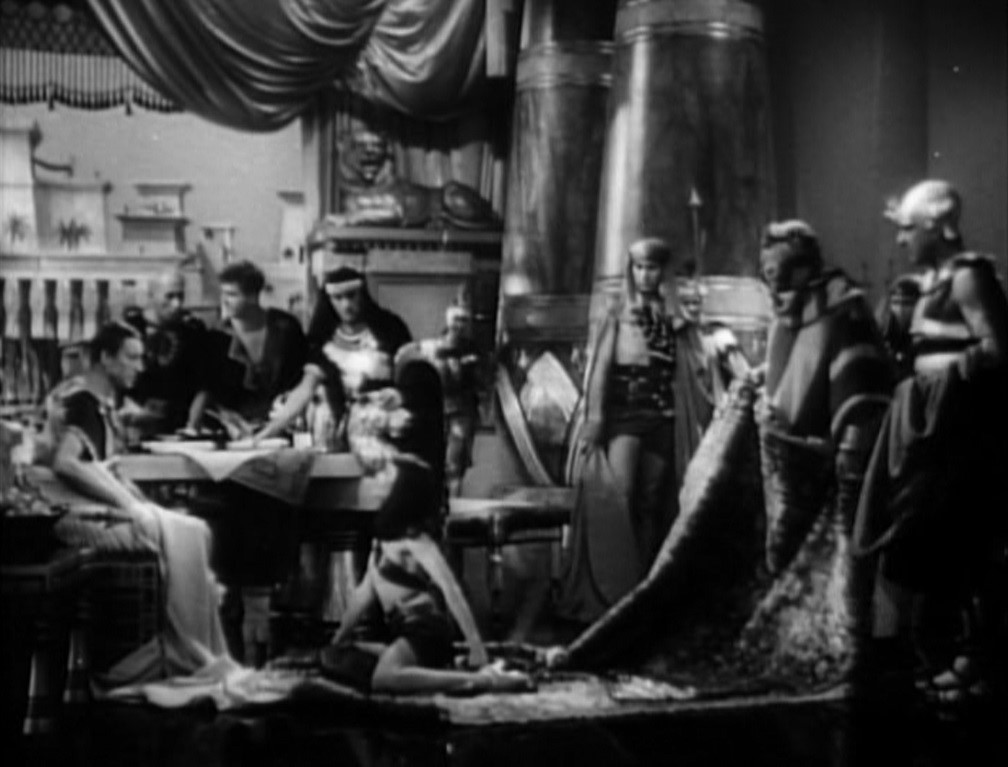
"It was quite difficult to be rolled into a rug and breathe and come out looking pleased with yourself," Colbert remembered. "We only had to do that scene once."

In 48 BC, Cleopatra vies with her brother Ptolemy for control of Egypt. Pothinos kidnaps her and Apollodorus and strands them in the desert. When Pothinos informs Julius Caesar that the queen has fled the country, Caesar is ready to sign an agreement with Ptolemy when Apollodorus appears, bearing a gift carpet for the Roman. When Apollodorus unrolls it, Cleopatra emerges, much to Pothinos' surprise. He tries to deny who she is.

Caesar sees through the deception, and Cleopatra soon beguiles Caesar with the prospect of the riches of Egypt and India. Later, when they are seemingly alone, she spots a sandal peeking out from underneath a curtain and thrusts a spear into the hidden Pothinos, foiling his assassination attempt. Caesar makes Cleopatra the sole ruler of Egypt, and begins an affair with her.

Caesar eventually returns to Rome with Cleopatra to the cheers of the masses but Roman unease is directed at Cleopatra. Cassius, Casca, Brutus and other powerful Romans become disgruntled, rightly suspecting that he intends to abolish the Roman Republic and make himself emperor, with Cleopatra as his empress (after divorcing Calpurnia). Ignoring the forebodings of Calpurnia, Cleopatra, and a soothsayer who warns him about the Ides of March, Caesar goes to announce his intentions to the Senate. Before he can do so, he is assassinated.

Cleopatra is heartbroken at the news. At first, she wants to go to him, but Apollodorus tells her that Caesar did not love her, only her power and wealth, and that Egypt needs her. They return home.

Bitter rivals Marc Antony and Octavian are named co-rulers of Rome. Antony, disdainful of women, invites Cleopatra to meet with him in Tarsus, intending to bring her back to Rome as a captive. Enobarbus, his close friend, warns Antony against meeting Cleopatra, but he goes anyway. She entices him to her barge and throws a party with many exotic animals and beautiful dancers, and soon seduces him. Together, they sail to Egypt.

King Herod, who has secretly allied himself with Octavian, visits the lovers. He informs Cleopatra privately that Rome and Octavian can be appeased if Antony were to be poisoned. Herod also tells Antony the same thing, with the roles reversed. Antony laughs off his suggestion, but a reluctant Cleopatra, reminded of her duty to Egypt by Apollodorus, tests a poison on a condemned murderer to see how it works. Before Antony can drink the fatal wine, however, they receive news that Octavian has declared war.

Antony orders his generals and legions to gather, but Enobarbus informs him that they have all deserted out of loyalty to Rome. Enobarbus tells his comrade that he can wrest control of Rome away from Octavian by having Cleopatra killed, but Antony refuses to consider it. Enobarbus bids Antony goodbye, as he will not fight for an Egyptian queen against Rome. A short montage sequence shows the fighting between the forces of Antony and Octavian, ending in the naval Battle of Actium.

Antony fights on with the Egyptian army, and is defeated. Octavian and his soldiers surround and besiege Antony and Cleopatra. Antony is mocked when he offers to fight them one by one. Without his knowledge, Cleopatra opens the gate and offers to cede Egypt in return for Antony's life in exile, but Octavian turns her down. Meanwhile, Antony believes that she has deserted him for his rival and stabs himself. When Cleopatra returns, she is heartbroken to find him dying. They reconcile before he perishes. Then, with the gates breached, Cleopatra kills herself with a venomous snake and is found sitting on her throne, dead.

== Cast ==
The closing credits list 32 actors and the names of their characters:

- Claudette Colbert as Cleopatra
- Warren William as Julius Caesar
- Henry Wilcoxon as Marc Antony
- Joseph Schildkraut as King Herod
- Ian Keith as Octavian
- Gertrude Michael as Calpurnia
- C. Aubrey Smith as Enobarbus
- Irving Pichel as Apollodorus
- Arthur Hohl as Brutus
- Edwin Maxwell as Casca
- Ian Maclaren as Cassius
- Eleanor Phelps as Charmion, Cleopatra's servant
- Leonard Mudie as Pothinos
- Grace Durkin as Iras, Cleopatra's servant
- Ferdinand Gottschalk as Glabrio
- Claudia Dell as Octavia
- Harry Beresford as Soothsayer
- Jayne Regan as Lady Vesta (as Jane Regan)
- William Farnum as Lepidus
- Lionel Belmore as Fidius
- Florence Roberts as Lady Flora
- Richard Alexander as General Philodemas
- Celia Ryland as Lady Leda
- William V. Mong as Court physician
- Robert Warwick as General Achillas
- George Walsh as Courier
- Jack Rutherford as Flavius
- Kenneth Gibson as Scribe
- Wedgewood Nowell as Scribe
- Bruce Warren as Scribe
- Robert Seiter as Aelius (as Robert Manning)
- Edgar Dearing as the convict who tests the poison

== Production ==
=== Development ===
In July 1933, several weeks before Cecil B. DeMille began production on his film Four Frightened People, Paramount informed the press that DeMille's next film would be Cleopatra. Claudette Colbert, one of the stars of Four Frightened People, was cast as Cleopatra. That same month, screenwriters Jeanie MacPherson and Bartlett Cormack were preparing the upcoming film in Hollywood. In November, while DeMille was in Hawaii filming Four Frightened People in the daytime, he and Cormack spent their nights in the Hilo public library doing research and working on the script for Cleopatra. The 12-person research team, led by MacPherson, worked for eight months.

In January 1934, DeMille revealed that the dialogue of Cleopatra would be written in modern English. Vincent Lawrence, a screenwriter signed to work on the film, did his writing at home. Before producing his own version, DeMille wanted to see the 1917 silent version of Cleopatra with Theda Bara in the title role, so he borrowed a print of that film and screened it on February 15. By February 17, $60,000 had been spent on research and story preparation. DeMille's idea was to humanize the characters and give them "their first really human chance", because he felt they were always depicted as "ponderous and pompous, villains and heroes." He did not like William Shakespeare's play Antony and Cleopatra, so he based the screenplay on historical sources, including The Life and Times of Cleopatra by Arthur Weigall. DeMille saw Cleopatra as a victim of malicious Roman propaganda and believed she did not regard Calpurnia as Julius Caesar's legitimate wife. He wanted to "make the picture an authentic screen document" and also stated that he had finally discovered the answer to "the riddle of Cleopatra's desertion of the Battle of Actium", which had been a mystery to the historians who wrote about it.

=== Casting ===
Claudette Colbert was DeMille's first choice for the role of Cleopatra. In July 1933, columnist Edwin Schallert wrote, "Colbert has become DeMille's supreme find of the talkies. She missed playing in This Day and Age, but is in the cast of Four Frightened People, and ever since she did Poppaea in The Sign of the Cross, DeMille has had the idea of presenting her in another glitter role." Before he signed her for the part, DeMille warned Colbert that she would have to play Cleopatra's death scene with a snake. He said to her, "I want you to play it. I don't want anyone but you for Cleopatra. Will we just not say any more about the snake until we come to it, and will you trust me if I tell you that you can play the scene?" Colbert agreed because she wanted the role. She gained weight for the film and also read biographies of Cleopatra.

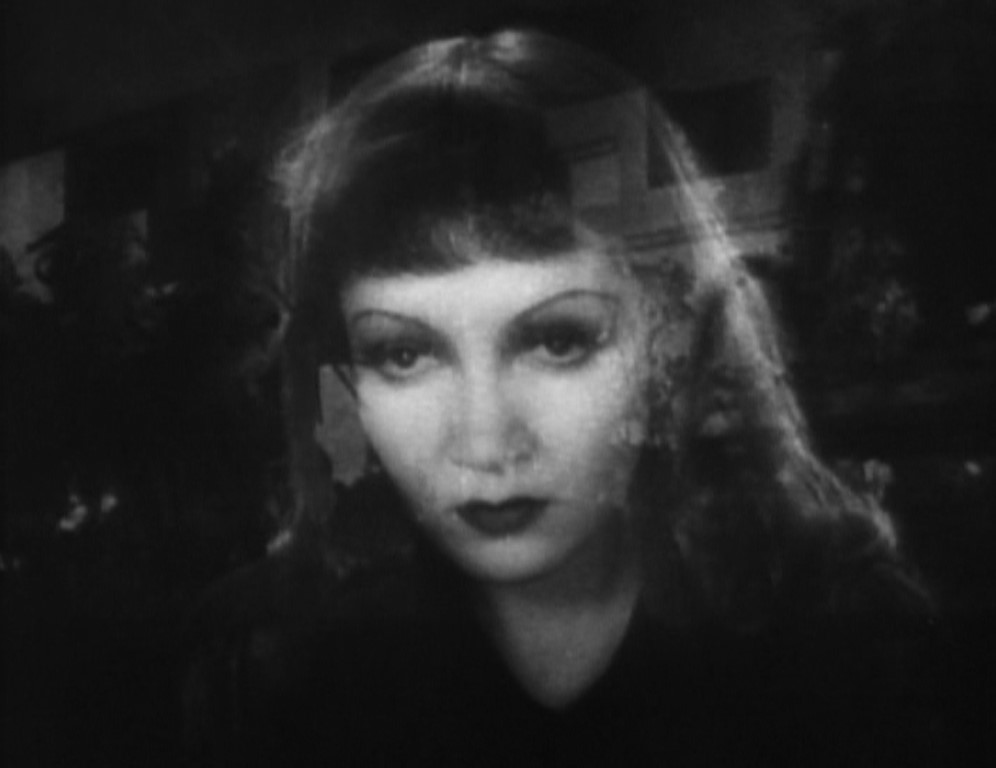
Claudette Colbert as Cleopatra

Silent film star Theda Bara, who portrayed Cleopatra in the 1917 silent version, said:

Although at first thought you don't classify Claudette Colbert as what was once called a "vampire," I think she will probably give an excellent performance.

When I played the part I read every book I could find concerning the Egyptian Queen and discovered to my amazement that she was actually a very capable housewife with several children, not especially beautiful nor the physically alluring siren handed down by our legendary history.

You can't give the public any such Cleopatra, so we adopted Shakespeare's "A woman of infinite variety, whom custom could not stale" as our keynote for the exotic woman they could accept. No doubt Mr. DeMille has an interesting conception of the role, and Claudette will make her appropriately glamorous.

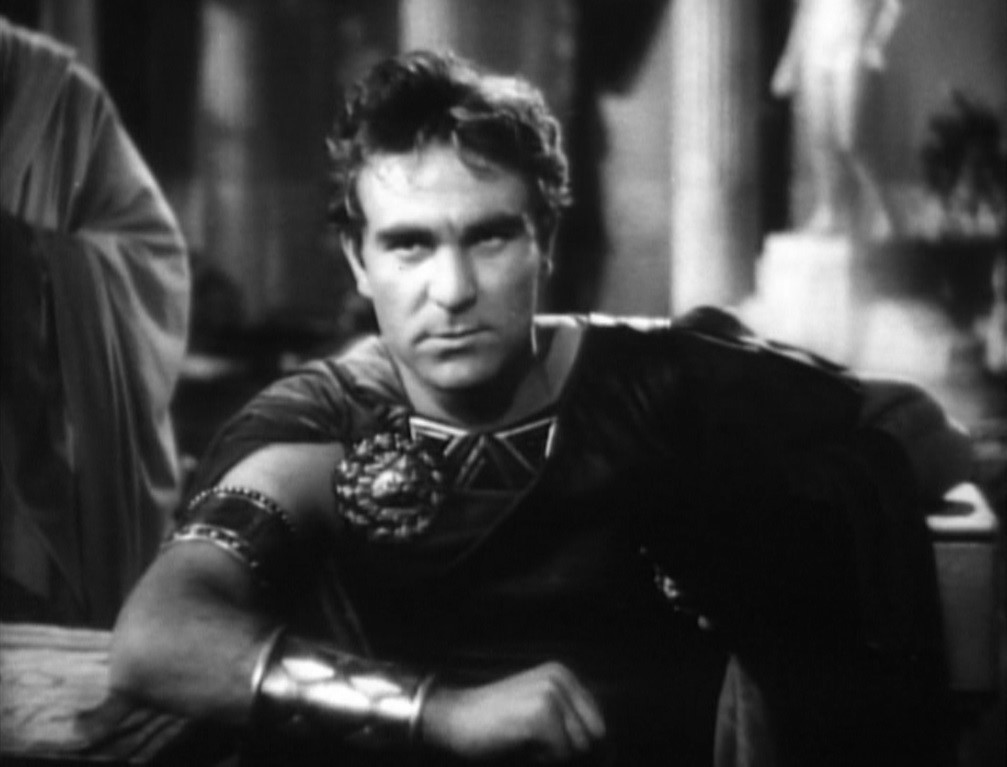
Henry Wilcoxon as Marc Antony

Fredric March, Colbert's co-star in The Sign of the Cross, was DeMille's first choice for the role of Marc Antony. In October 1933, columnist Louella Parsons said that March was about to leave Paramount to become a freelancer but had signed with the studio to play the part. Other candidates for the role included Richard Dix, Charles Bickford, and William Gargan. In late December, Parsons revealed that March had been replaced by Brian Aherne, who owed Paramount one film and was chosen by DeMille for the role. Aherne was not cast in the film, and DeMille had to look for another actor. In his autobiography, DeMille remembered how he discovered Henry Wilcoxon. He had not yet found a "satisfactory" Marc Antony and was waiting his turn to use Paramount's projection room in order to see some footage of horses he wanted to use in the film. While he was waiting in the projectionist's booth, DeMille heard "a resonant, manly voice, with only a pleasant trace of an English accent." He then looked through the window of the booth and saw on the screen "a young actor, with a handsome, strong, sensitive face, a finely-shaped head, and a powerfully-built frame." DeMille saw the test a second time and asked about the actor. The projectionist told him that the young man was an English stage actor who had just signed with Paramount and that they were changing his name from Harry Wilcoxon to Henry Wilcoxon. DeMille replied, "Harry or Henry, he is Marc Antony." In January 1934, Parsons announced that DeMille had found an actor to play Antony and that he made a deal with Emmanuel Cohen to borrow Henry Wilcoxon.

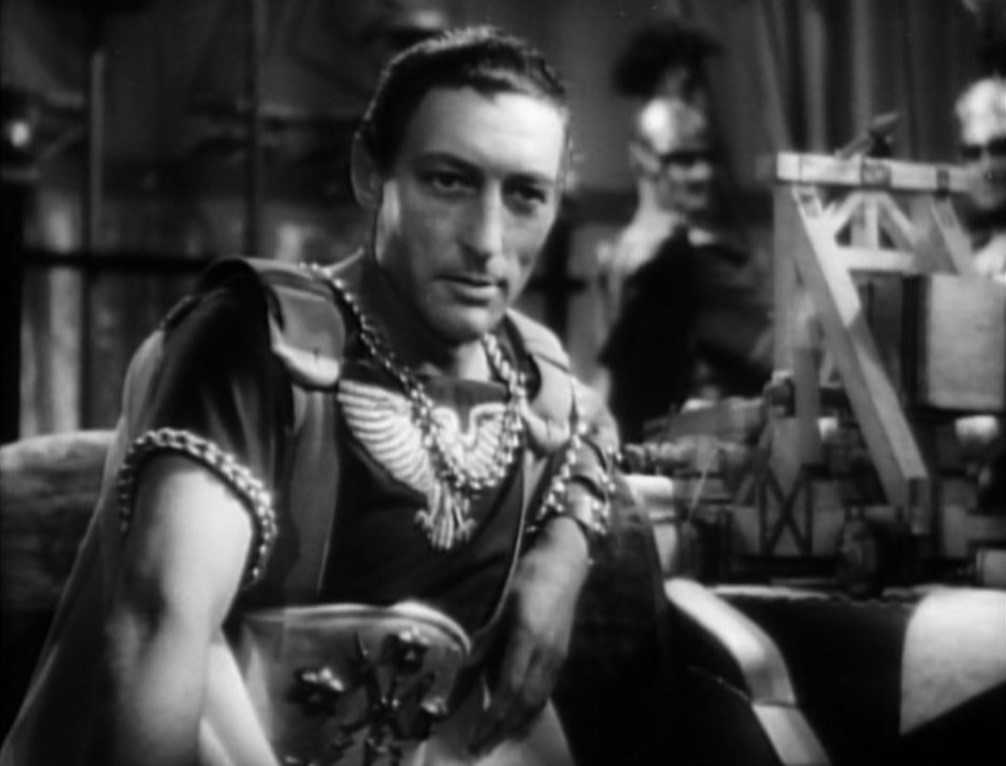
Warren William as Julius Caesar

In November 1933, Parsons notified her readers that Charles Laughton, who played Nero in The Sign of the Cross, had been cast as Julius Caesar. DeMille also considered Adolph Menjou and John Gilbert. He searched Hollywood, New York, and London for an actor who could play Caesar. The press reported that DeMille was making ten screen tests every day. DeMille selected Warren William for the role of Caesar after he saw him in The Mouthpiece. William's Roman profile helped him win the role. In February 1934, Warners loaned William to Paramount. In his autobiography, DeMille wrote:

For the part of Julius Caesar I chose Warren William. Perhaps he was overshadowed in the public mind by the other talent in the picture or by the fact that, true to history, Caesar was killed halfway through the story; but I have always felt that neither the critics nor the public did justice to Warren William's performance. I have seen other fine actors playing Julius Caesar; I have never seen any that surpassed Warren William.

DeMille had a role in mind for his daughter Katherine DeMille, an up-and-coming actress, but she turned it down. Katherine wanted to avoid accusations of nepotism and also thought she was still not prepared for such an important job, saying that both she and her father had "strong tempers."

In March 1934, C. Aubrey Smith was cast as Enobarbus. That same month, Gertrude Michael was given the role of Caesar's wife, Calpurnia, and Eleanor Phelps won the part of Charmion, Cleopatra's handmaiden. Judith Allen, the leading lady of DeMille's This Day and Age, was the director's original choice for the role of Marc Antony's wife, Octavia, but the role was later assigned to Claudia Dell. DeMille cast two of his favorite actors, Joseph Schildkraut and Ian Keith, in the roles of King Herod and Octavian, respectively.

=== Art direction and set design ===
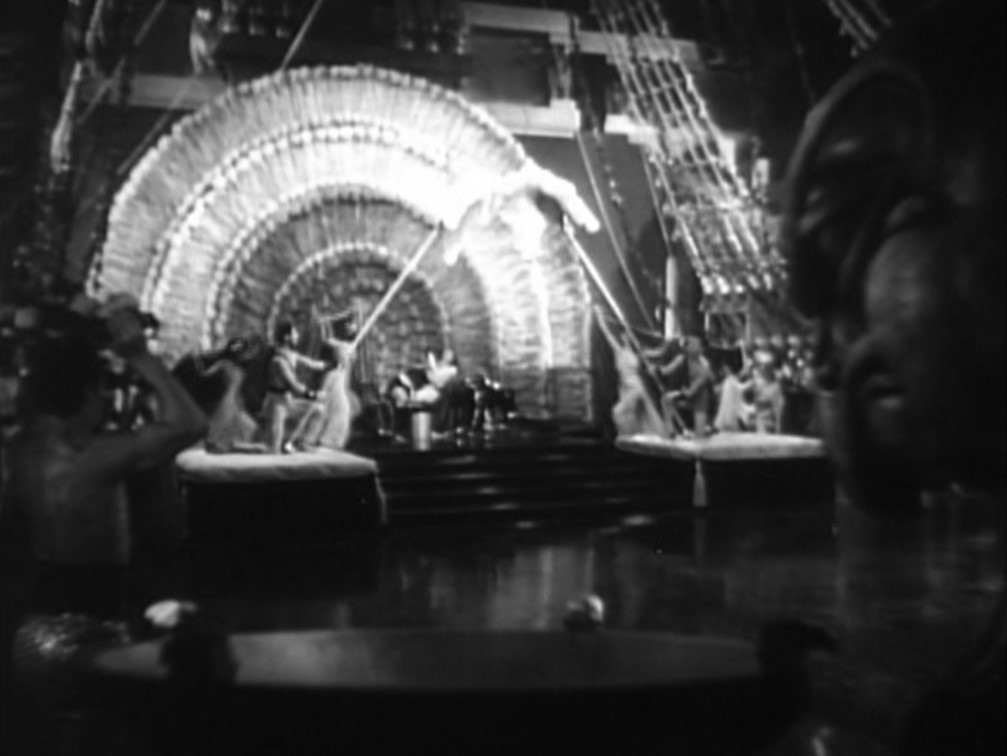
The arch of ostrich feathers.

Early concept art by John Harkrider was influenced by ancient Greek art and architecture. Art director Boris Leven made four paintings of Cleopatra's Egyptian-style barge with an arch of feathers, but he did not receive on-screen credit for his work. Artist Harold Miles drew the concept sketch of the shot of a defeated Marc Antony confronting Octavian's army.

The film is memorable for the sumptuous Art Deco look of its sets. Art directors Hans Dreier and Roland Anderson worked on the film. Ralph Jester designed the throne room set and also made busts of Colbert as Cleopatra and William as Julius Caesar. Paramount's plaster shop hired 120 sculptors and plaster workers for the construction of the film's sphinxes, columns, and other parts of the sets. The Roman bath set measured 100 by 150 feet. DeMille's legendary set piece in the film is Cleopatra's seduction of Antony, which takes place on Cleopatra's barge. The arch of plumes behind Cleopatra's couch had 600 ostrich feathers and was 20 feet tall and 30 feet wide. The barge set also had a backdrop representing a hill, a city, and a river painted "in tones of gray, beautifully applied to enhance perspective", with stars in the form of "rhinestones suspended on invisible threads, catching the gleam of arc lights."

=== Costumes ===
Travis Banton designed Cleopatra's gowns. Colbert once said, "I always wore clothes by Travis Banton—he was a great designer." Colbert's beaded gown weighed 75 pounds, and Wilcoxon's armor weighed 110 pounds. In one scene, the Egyptian dancers waved fans that were made of 600 pheasant feathers. "The hair of 700 Egyptian peasants" was used to create wigs, curls, hair switches, and hair pieces for the leading actors and extras. 55 gallons of body makeup were needed to tan the extras who played Egyptian and Roman soldiers. Paramount's foundries cast more than four tons of armor for the soldiers' costumes.

=== Filming ===
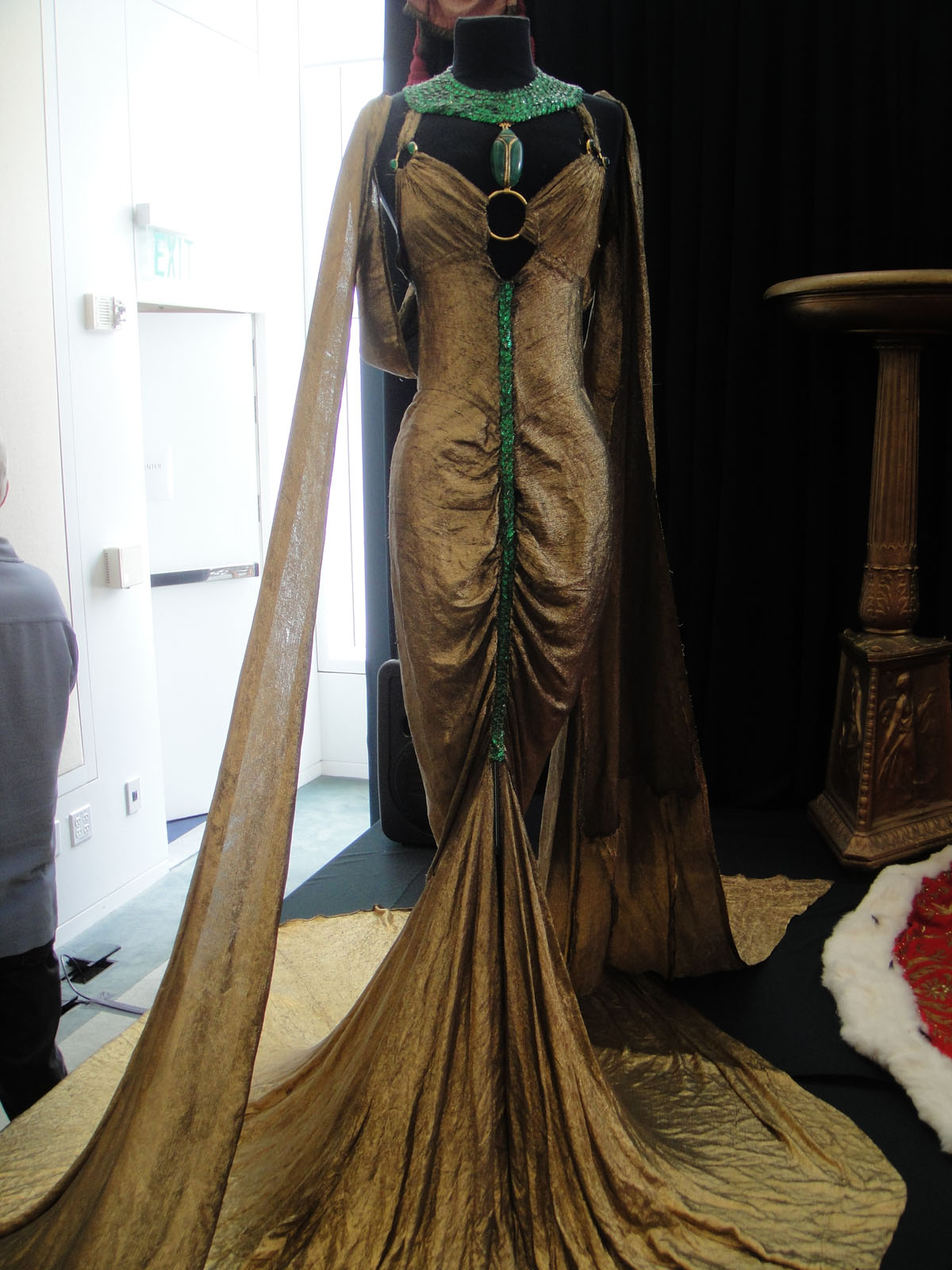
Travis Banton's gold-lamé and emerald royal boudoir gown, which Cleopatra wore in the scene where she is about to poison Marc Antony.

Filming began on March 13, 1934. Several exterior scenes were shot on location in the desert close to Muroc and at the sand dunes of El Segundo, California. The shoot was a difficult one due to Colbert contracting appendicitis on the set of her previous film, Four Frightened People, leaving her able to stand for only a few minutes at a time. Colbert's stand-in, Gladys Jeans, knew Cleopatra's lines and substituted for Colbert during rehearsals. Heavy costumes complicated matters further.

The shot where Cleopatra is rolled out of a rug was filmed in one take. In the later years of her career, Colbert reminisced about DeMille and the filming of Cleopatra: "'Cornnn-y' I used to tell him . . . but he knew what he was doing. And you always did things his way." She recalled, "In one scene he wanted Caesar to drop rose petals on my feet. I screamed with laughter when he told me that. I said, 'He can touch my foot, he can even bite it, but if he drops rose petals on it, I'll just burst out laughing.' He finally agreed—it was one of the few times I ever won an argument with him." Unlike her co-star Warren William, Colbert was not intimidated by DeMille: "Warren raised wire-haired fox terriers. DeMille frightened him, but then, DeMille frightened almost all his actors. I could say no to him."

Dancer and choreographer Agnes de Mille, DeMille's niece, was originally hired to work on the barge sequence. DeMille wanted her to do a dance number, supervise some dances, and serve as an assistant. Agnes posed in costume for some publicity photos, but they disagreed on the interpretation of the dance on the back of the bull and Agnes walked out of the set in late April.

DeMille thought Joseph Schildkraut gave one of the finest performances in his career; Schildkraut was surprised when he heard that, since he considered King Herod to be a "small part". DeMille described the scene where Marc Antony and Enobarbus part ways as "one of the most moving scenes in any picture I have made."

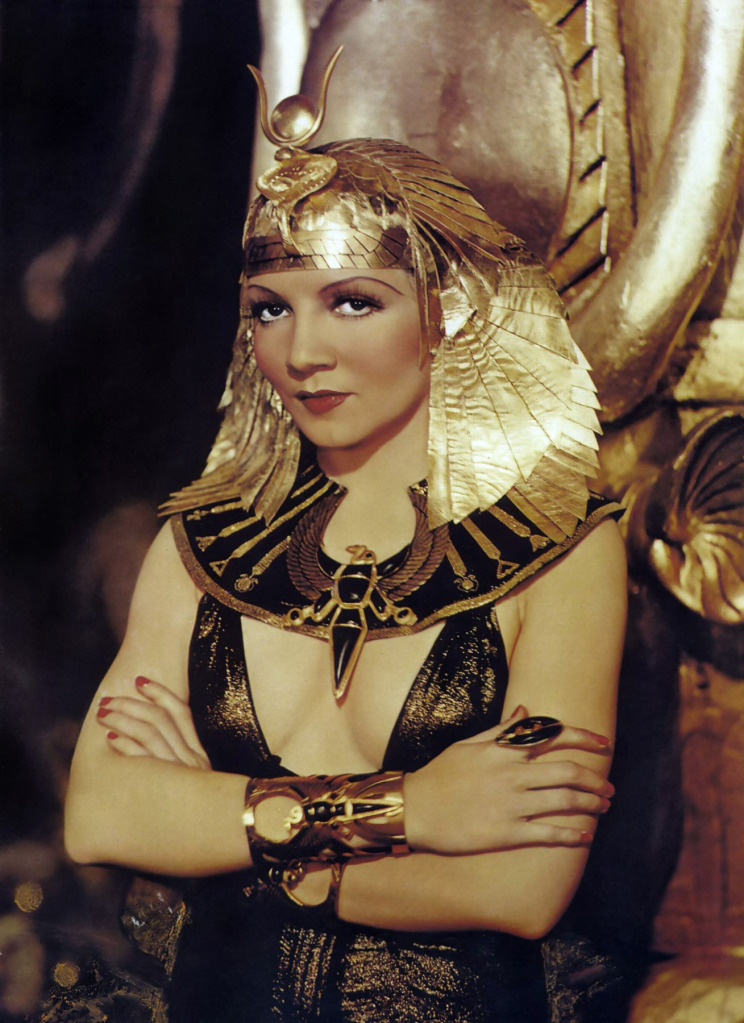
Colbert wearing Cleopatra's final costume.

In his autobiography, DeMille wrote, "In all her scenes with Warren William, Henry Wilcoxon, and the rest, [Colbert] was perfect. She was the imperious Queen. She was the vivacious, alluring woman. She was Egypt." Due to Colbert's fear of snakes, he put off Cleopatra's death scene for as long as possible. When it came time to film the final scene, DeMille borrowed a boa constrictor from Griffith Park Zoo and walked onto the set with the large snake wrapped around his body. Hiding a six-inch asp in his left hand behind his back, he held the boa constrictor's head in his right hand and pointed it towards the throne. The sight of the large snake frightened Colbert very much, and she begged DeMille to stay away and refused to touch it. DeMille then revealed the "tiny" snake he had been hiding and said, "Well, how about this?" Colbert responded, "Oh, that little thing! Give it to me!" He later remarked, "Claudette played her death scene with the proper little snake, and played it very well."

Principal photography ended on May 2, 1934, with DeMille shooting retakes and close-ups. On May 11, he shot some of the footage of the battle sequence. Gordon Jennings and William Cameron Menzies designed the battle montages, which were filmed by Menzies between May 22 and June 17.

On July 1, 1934, the Motion Picture Production Code began to be rigidly enforced and expanded by Joseph Breen. Talkie films made before that date are generally referred to as "pre-Code" films. However, DeMille was able to get away with using more risqué imagery than he would be able to do in his later productions. He opens the film with an apparently naked, but strategically lit Egyptian maidservant holding up an incense burner in each hand as the title appears on screen.

=== Music ===
The film was scored in early June 1934. DeMille ordered composer Rudolph G. Kopp to use harps in the love themes. For the atrium scene, he wanted light and happy music played with three harps and a flute.

== Release ==
The trailer for the film's 1950s re-release.

On August 16, 1934, Cleopatra received its world premiere at the Paramount Theatre in New York City.

The premiere audience, which gave the film a standing ovation, included social leaders, diplomats, and famous stars of stage and film.

In its first week at the Paramount, the film set an annual record with 110,383 admissions.

== Reception ==
Mordaunt Hall of The New York Times described the film as "one of the director's most ambitious spectacles. It has substantial, decorative settings, a wealth of minor properties, an imposing array of histrionic talent and an army of extras. Cleopatra reveals Mr. De Mille in an emphatically lavish, but nevertheless a relatively restrained mood." Film Daily called it a "sumptuous historical drama" with a "strong cast" and "good entertainment values". John Mosher of The New Yorker wrote that "Even as extravaganza it's moderate", and thought the dialogue was "the worst I have ever heard in the talkies." Variety agreed that "Often the lines drew titters that are not being angled for", but maintained, "Photographically the picture is superb."

Hall said that "Claudette Colbert, the Poppaea of The Sign of the Cross, is entrusted with the part of Cleopatra. She wears a dark wig and looks even more attractive than usual. She speaks her lines with the necessary confidence, whether they are concerned with love, hate or politics. When it is a matter of disposing of Pothinos with a javelin, she conducts herself with the coolness of a queen of the olden days. And when the chance is offered for a little comedy she acquits herself cleverly." He also wrote that Warren William "shines in his rôle" as Caesar and "is especially apt when it comes to delivering a brief line", and commended Henry Wilcoxon's "excellent [acting], especially in the more dramatic sequences."

The book Movies on TV, 1986-1987 includes a positive review of the film: "Lavishly produced, this De Mille spectacular nonetheless works on a more intimate level than most epics as it entails the affairs of the Queen of the Nile and her Roman lovers. Colbert plays Cleo as a saucy coquette, which helps lighten the traditionally heavy plotting which ruins most big budget spectacles."

In his Movie Guide, film critic Leonard Maltin gave Cleopatra 3½ out of 4 stars and wrote, "Opulent DeMille version of Cleopatra doesn't date badly, stands out as one of his most intelligent films, thanks in large part to fine performances by all."

== Accolades ==
At the 7th Academy Awards in 1935, Cleopatra won for Best Cinematography (Victor Milner). It was nominated for four more awards: Outstanding Production (Paramount), Best Assistant Director (Cullen Tate), Best Film Editing (Anne Bauchens), and Best Sound Recording (Franklin Hansen).

In its October 1934 issue, Motion Picture Magazine included Claudette Colbert's portrayal of Cleopatra and Henry Wilcoxon's portrayal of Marc Antony in the list of "Performances You Should Not Miss This Month".

In its January 1935 issue, The New Movie Magazine named Claudette Colbert's performance in Cleopatra the "Movie Highlight of the Year" for August 1934, the month in which the film premiered.

== Legacy ==
In 1935, actor Lyle Talbot said he considered Claudette Colbert to be the definitive on-screen Cleopatra: "Since I saw Cleopatra, I have not been able to picture any other actress on the screen as the exciting Egyptian queen. To me Colbert is Cleopatra—beautiful, intelligent, alluring and emotional."

In 1963, a West Coast film critic compared the 1934 and 1963 versions of Cleopatra and thought Claudette Colbert was the superior Cleopatra: "A better Cleopatra for her day than Liz Taylor is in hers." That same year, Colbert said DeMille handled the large screen and cast of thousands "like no one else", and she also believed "he shaped the times, very much too. Henry Wilcoxon's rugged features were not standard for heroes at the time, but they became so." According to Colbert, DeMille "threw himself wholeheartedly into his work" and was not "so sophisticated about spectacle that he patronized it".

In 1978, Colbert included Cleopatra in the list "of her films she'd most like to own". The following year, she stated, "Today, with everyone trying to be so sophisticated and tongue in cheek, something is taken away. DeMille's films were special: somehow when he put everything together, there was a special kind of glamour and sincerity. It's so different now."

In an April 1996 Vanity Fair questionnaire, Colbert was asked, "If you were to die and come back as a person or thing, what do you think it would be?" She answered, "Cleopatra".

== Home media ==
Cleopatra, along with The Sign of the Cross, Four Frightened People, The Crusades and Union Pacific, was released on DVD in 2006 by Universal Studios as part of the five-disc box set The Cecil B. DeMille Collection.

It has been released for home viewing several times in the United States of America, including a 75th anniversary DVD edition in 2009 by Universal Studios Home Entertainment.

In the United Kingdom, Cleopatra was released in a Dual Format DVD and Blu-ray edition on September 24, 2012, by Eureka as part of their Masters of Cinema series.

On April 10, 2018, Universal Pictures Home Entertainment released the film on Blu-ray.

== See also ==
- List of cultural depictions of Cleopatra
- National Recovery Administration (NRA), the logo displayed at start of film

== Bibliography ==
- Birchard, Robert S. (2004). Cecil B. DeMille's Hollywood. University Press of Kentucky. ISBN 9780813123240.
- DeMille, Cecil B. (1959). The Autobiography of Cecil B. DeMille. Prentice Hall. LCCN 59-15367.
- Eyman, Scott (2010). Empire of Dreams: The Epic Life of Cecil B. DeMille. Simon and Schuster. ISBN 9781439180419.
