= Cesare Danova =

Italian actor (1926–1992)

- Born: Cesare Deitinger; March 1, 1926; Rome, Italy
- Died: March 19, 1992 (aged 66); Los Angeles, California, U.S.
- Resting place: Valley Oaks Memorial Park, Westlake Village, California
- Occupation: Actor
- Years active: 1947–1992
- Spouse(s): Pamela Matthews (1955–1963) (divorced) 2 children Patricia Chandler (1977–1992) (his death)

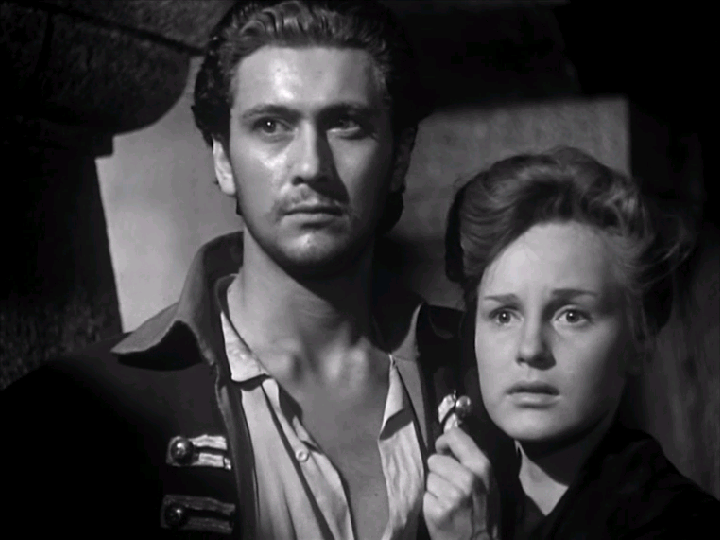
Danova and Irasema Dilian in The Captain's Daughter (1947)

Cesare Danova (March 1, 1926 – March 19, 1992) was an Italian actor. He was best known for his roles in The Captain's Daughter (1947), Viva Las Vegas (1964), Chamber of Horrors (1966), Mean Streets (1973), National Lampoon's Animal House (1978) and various roles in The Rifleman (1958–1963).

== Life and career ==
Born as Cesare Deitinger in Bergamo, (Note: Danova's obituary in the Los Angeles Times notes he was born in Bergamo.) Italy to an Austrian father (Note: The book Italian Americans: The History and Culture of a People says that his father was Australian.) and an Italian mother, he adopted Danova as his stage name after becoming an actor in Rome at the end of World War II. After the film Don Juan (1955) he immigrated to the United States. He was contracted to Metro-Goldwyn-Mayer in 1956.

His appearances include The Man Who Understood Women (1959). He tested for a part in Ben Hur, but his big break was the role of Apollodorus, Cleopatra's personal servant, in the 1963 film Cleopatra, directed by Joseph Mankiewicz and starring Elizabeth Taylor, Richard Burton and Rex Harrison. The original script called for a major role for Danova, who was to form a trio of Cleopatra's lovers alongside Harrison's Caesar and Burton's Marc Antony. Though a number of scenes featuring Taylor and Danova were shot, the script was revised and the role truncated as the Burton-Taylor affair made tabloid headlines. The following year Danova starred as Count Elmo Mancini in Viva Las Vegas as Elvis Presley's rival for both Ann-Margret and the Las Vegas Grand Prix.

In 1967, Danova played the role of Actor in the TV series Garrison's Gorillas. The series only ran for 26 episodes. Two of his best roles were as the neighborhood mafia Don, Giovanni Cappa, in Martin Scorsese's Mean Streets (1973) and as the corrupt mayor of Faber, Carmine DePasto, in National Lampoon's Animal House (1978). He appeared in three episodes of The Rifleman, and regularly appeared as a guest star on numerous television series, including Honey West; The Man from U.N.C.L.E.; That Girl; Daniel Boone; Charlie's Angels; The Love Boat; Sanford and Son; Fantasy Island; McMillan & Wife; Police Story; Murder, She Wrote; Airwolf; Hunter; Maude; The Rifleman; Mannix; Night Gallery; Falcon Crest; Hart to Hart; Mission: Impossible (1988–90); and his final television appearance in 1992 as Father DiMarco on In the Heat of the Night.

== Death ==
Danova died of a heart attack on March 19, 1992, aged 66, at the Academy of Motion Picture Arts and Sciences headquarters in Los Angeles while attending a meeting of the Foreign Language Film committee. (Note: Danova's obituary in the Los Angeles Times says, "Danova died Thursday night at Cedars-Sinai Medical Center ...")

== Family ==
Danova was married twice and had two sons, Marco and Fabrizio, by his first wife, Pamela.

== Selected filmography ==
- The Captain's Daughter (1947) – Piotr Andrejevich Grinev
- Monaca santa (1949) – Angelo De Blase
- Cavalcade of Heroes (1950) – Massimo Ruffo
- El final de una leyenda (1951) – Carlos Montaña
- The King's Mail (1951) – Marcos de Malta
- Repentance (1952) – Sandro
- The Black Mask (1952) – Villeneuve
- The Three Pirates (1952) – Il Corsaro Verde – Carlo di Ventimiglia
- Jolanda, the Daughter of the Black Corsair (1953)
- Cavallina storna (1953) – Sandro
- Balocchi e profumi (1953) – Lorenzo
- Processo contro ignoti (1953) – Avv. Enzo Pirani
- Crossed Swords (1954) – Raniero
- Loves of Three Queens (1954) – Count Siegfried (segment: I Cavalieri dell'illusione)
- I cavalieri dell'illusione (1954)
- Don Juan (1955) – Don Giovanni
- Non scherzare con le donne (1955)
- Incatenata dal destino (1956) – Kirk Mauri
- Ces sacrées vacances (1956) – Ralph Carigan
- The Rifleman (1958-1963) – Duel of Honor, Baranca, The Guest
- Tarzan, the Ape Man (1959) – Harry Holt
- The Man Who Understood Women (1959) – Major Marco Ranieri
- Catch Me If You Can (1959)
- Valley of the Dragons (1961) – Hector Servadac
- Zane Grey Theater TV (1961) Episode "The Release" Excellently cast as Gunfighter/Artist Lee DuVal
- Tender Is the Night (1962) – Tommy Barban
- Cleopatra (1963) – Apollodorus
- Gidget Goes to Rome (1963) – Paolo Cellini
- Viva Las Vegas (1964) – Count Elmo Mancini
- Bonanza (1965) (TV) season 6 episode 17 (Woman of fire) : Don Luis Santana
- Boy, Did I Get a Wrong Number! (1966) – Pepe Pepponi
- Chamber of Horrors (1966) – Anthony Draco
- Che! (1969) – Ramon Valdez
- Horowitz in Dublin (1973)
- Mean Streets (1973) – Giovanni
- A Matter of Wife... and Death (1975) – Dottore
- Scorchy (1976) – Philip Bianco
- Tentacles (1977) – John Corey
- The Astral Factor (1978) – Mario
- Animal House (1978) – Mayor Carmine DePasto
