= Douglas Stewart (film editor) =

American film editor

- Born: Samuel Douglas Stewart; March 29, 1919; Vancouver, British Columbia, Canada
- Died: March 3, 1995 (aged 75); Calabasas, California, U.S.
- Occupation: film editor
- Years active: 1953–1983

Douglas Stewart (March 29, 1919 – March 3, 1995) was a Hollywood-based Canadian film and television editor with about 16 feature film credits from 1953 – 1983. He won the Academy Award for Best Film Editing for the film, The Right Stuff (1983), along with co-editors Glenn Farr, Lisa Fruchtman, Stephen A. Rotter, and Tom Rolf. The Right Stuff was the fourth film of Stewart's notable collaboration with director Philip Kaufman, which began with The Great Northfield, Minnesota Raid (1972). Stewart's extensive television work was honored twice by nominations for Emmy awards.

== Selected filmography ==
Based on Stewart's filmography at the Internet Database.

Editor
Year	Film	Director	Notes
1953	The Hitch-Hiker	Ida Lupino	
1957	Eighteen and Anxious	Joe Parker	
1958	Girl in the Woods	Tom Gries	
1965	Nightmare in the Sun	Marc Lawrence	
1967	Games	Curtis Harrington	
1969	Change of Habit	William A. Graham	
1972	The Great Northfield, Minnesota Raid	Philip Kaufman	First collaboration with Philip Kaufman
1974	The White Dawn	Philip Kaufman	Second collaboration with Philip Kaufman
1976	The Shootist	Don Siegel	First collaboration with Don Siegel
1977	Telefon	Don Siegel	Second collaboration with Don Siegel
1978	Invasion of the Body Snatchers	Philip Kaufman	Third collaboration with Philip Kaufman
1979	Walk Proud	Robert L. Collins	
1980	Rough Cut	Don Siegel	Third collaboration with Don Siegel
1982	Fast-Walking	James B. Harris	
1982	Jinxed!	Don Siegel	Fourth collaboration with Don Siegel
1983	The Right Stuff	Philip Kaufman	Fourth collaboration with Philip Kaufman

Producer
Year	Film	Director	Credit
1965	Nightmare in the Sun	Marc Lawrence	Associate producer

Sound department
Year	Film	Director	Role	Notes
1957	Beginning of the End	Bert I. Gordon	Sound effects editor	First collaboration with Bert I. Gordon
1957	The Cyclops	Bert I. Gordon	Sound effects	Second collaboration with Bert I. Gordon

TV movies

Editor
Year	Film	Director
1967	How I Spent My Summer Vacation	William Hale
1968	Companions in Nightmare	Norman Lloyd
1968	The Smugglers	Norman Lloyd
1969	Trial Run	William A. Graham
1970	Ritual of Evil	Robert Day
1970	Lost Flight	Leonard Horn
1971	Marriage: Year One	William A. Graham
1972	The Victim	Herschel Daugherty
1973	Runaway!	David Lowell Rich
1974	Man on the Outside	Boris Sagal
1974	The Cay	Patrick Garland
1974	The Greatest Gift	Boris Sagal
1975	A Cry for Help	Daryl Duke
1975	One of Our Own	Richard C. Sarafian

TV series

Editor
Year	Title	Notes
1959	Schlitz Playhouse of Stars	1 episode
1958−59	M Squad	23 episodes
1959−60	Markham	13 episodes
1961	Coronado 9	1 episode
1960−61	The Deputy	23 episodes
1962	Father of the Bride	2 episodes
1962	87th Precinct	8 episodes
1962	Wagon Train	1 episode
1961−62	Frontier Circus	8 episodes
1964	Bob Hope Presents the Chrysler Theatre	1 episode
1962−65	Alfred Hitchcock Presents	31 episodes
1965−66	Run for Your Life	8 episodes
1968	The Name of the Game	1 episode
1968−69	It Takes a Thief	7 episodes
1968−69	The Outsider	2 episodes
1969	The Survivors	1 episode
1969−70	The Bold Ones: The Protectors	2 episodes
1970	The Virginian	1 episode
1970	The Bold Ones: The Senator	2 episodes
1971	O'Hara, U.S. Treasury	2 episodes
1972	The Bold Ones: The New Doctors	1 episode
1972	Madigan	1 episode
1967−73	Ironside	13 episodes
1975	The Six Million Dollar Man	1 episode
1975	Ellery Queen	1 episode
1976	Rich Man, Poor Man	4 episodes
1976−77	Rich Man, Poor Man Book II	6 episodes

Editorial department
Year	Title	Role	Notes
1960−61	The Deputy	Film editor	3 episodes

Sound department
Year	Title	Role	Notes
1955−56	Sergeant Preston of the Yukon	Sound editor	17 episodes

== See also ==
- List of film director and editor collaborations
