= The Devil in the Convent =

1950 film directed by Nunzio Malasomma

- Directed by: Nunzio Malasomma
- Written by: Paolo Campanella; Gilberto Govi; Nunzio Malasomma; Vincenzo Talarico; Gabriele Varriale
- Produced by: Vittorio Zumaglino
- Starring: Gilberto Govi; Carlo Ninchi; Mariella Lotti
- Cinematography: Leonida Barboni
- Edited by: Marcella Gengarelli
- Music by: Angelo Francesco Lavagnino
- Production company: Taurus Film
- Distributed by: Artisti Associati
- Release date: 1950
- Running time: 98 minutes
- Country: Italy
- Language: Italian

The Devil in the Convent (Italian: Il Diavolo in convento) is a 1950 Italian comedy film directed by Nunzio Malasomma and starring Gilberto Govi, Carlo Ninchi and Mariella Lotti.

It was shot at the Icet Studios in Milan and on location in Genoa and Gavi in Piedmont. The film took around 274 million lira at the Italian box office.

== Cast ==
- Gilberto Govi as frate Angelo
- Mariella Lotti as Adriana
- Carlo Ninchi as Milone
- Ave Ninchi as Caterina
- Giorgio Corradini as Pierino
- Georges Galley as Agostino
- Barbara Florian as Maria
- Leopoldo Valentini as fra Raffaele
- Mario Pisu as father Claudio
- Nerio Bernardi as commendator Brina
- Édouard Delmont

== Bibliography ==
- Chiti, Roberto & Poppi, Roberto. Dizionario del cinema italiano: Dal 1945 al 1959. Gremese Editore, 1991.
