= The Man Who Understood Women =

1959 film by Nunnally Johnson

- Theatrical release lobby card
- Directed by: Nunnally Johnson
- Screenplay by: Nunnally Johnson
- Based on: Les Couleurs du jour 1952 novel by Romain Gary
- Produced by: Nunnally Johnson
- Starring: Henry Fonda; Leslie Caron; Cesare Danova
- Cinematography: Milton R. Krasner
- Edited by: Marjorie Fowler
- Music by: Robert Emmett Dolan
- Production company: 20th Century Fox
- Distributed by: 20th Century Fox
- Release date: October 2, 1959 (United States)
- Running time: 105 minutes
- Country: United States
- Language: English
- Budget: $1,775,000

The Man Who Understood Women is a 1959 American comedy drama film written and directed by Nunnally Johnson from a novel by Romain Gary, and starring Henry Fonda, Leslie Caron and Cesare Danova, with a brief cameo by Renate Hoy as a French singer.

== Plot ==
Willie Bauche, a Hollywood producer, becomes so obsessed with turning his wife, Ann Garantier, into the sexiest star in Hollywood that he neglects her real needs. Feeling lonely and tired of Tinseltown, Ann returns to her native France and finds herself attracted to Marco Ranieri, a handsome and very attentive pilot. When Willie hears about the budding affair, he flies into a rage and hires assassins to kill his rival. Unfortunately for him, one of the killers is a romantic and decides that Ann and Marco are so in love that both must die so they can always be together. When Willie finds out, he rushes over to France to try to save his wife.

== Cast ==
- Henry Fonda as Bauche
- Leslie Caron as Ann
- Cesare Danova as Marco
- Conrad Nagel as Brody
- Myron McCormick as The Preacher

== See also ==
- List of American films of 1959
