= Why Girls Leave Home (1945 film) =

1945 film by William A. Berke

- Directed by: William Berke
- Written by: Fanya Foss (story and screenplay); Bradford Ropes (screenplay)
- Produced by: Samuel Sax
- Starring: Lola Lane; Sheldon Leonard; Pamela Blake
- Cinematography: Mack Stengler
- Edited by: Carl Pierson
- Music by: Walter Greene (uncredited)
- Production company: Producers Releasing Corporation
- Release date: October 9, 1945 (US)
- Running time: 69 min.
- Country: United States
- Language: English

Why Girls Leave Home is a 1945 American drama film directed by William Berke, written by Fanya Foss and Bradford Ropes, and starring Lola Lane, Sheldon Leonard, and Pamela Blake. The film's composer, Walter Greene, was nominated for an Academy Award for Best Original Score in 1945. Also, Jay Livingston and Ray Evans were nominated for Academy Award for Best Original Song for "The Cat and the Canary".

== Cast ==
- Lola Lane as Irene Mitchell
- Sheldon Leonard as Chris Williams
- Pamela Blake as Diana Leslie
- Elisha Cook Jr. as Jimmie Lobo
- Paul Guilfoyle as Steve Raymond
- Constance Worth as Flo
- Claudia Drake as Marien Mason
- Virginia Brissac as Mrs. Leslie
- Thomas Jackson as Reilly
- Peggy Lou Bianco as Peggy Leslie
- Evelynne Eaton as Alice
- Fred Kohler as Ted Leslie

== Production ==
Philip Yordan says he wrote the script in three days. He says he was approached by Edward Small who had set up the picture at Republic for which actors had been hired and sets built, but Herbert Yates head of the studio did not like the script. Small said Yates would finance if Yordan wrote the script, so he started on Friday, dictated it on Saturday and Sunday morning. Filming began on Monday.
