= Fanya Foss =

American screenwriter

- Born: October 4, 1906; Odesa, Russian Empire
- Died: December 12, 1995 (aged 89); Palm Springs, California, USA
- Education: Juilliard School
- Occupations: Screenwriter, TV writer
- Spouses: Edward Dahlberg (divorced) Gordon Kingman (divorced) Marc Lawrence (m. 1942)
- Children: 2

Fanya Foss (sometimes credited as Fanya Lawrence or F.A. Foss, October 4, 1906 – December 12, 1995) was a Russian-born American screenwriter, short story writer, and television writer active in Hollywood during the 1940s, 1950s, and 1960s. She was married to actor-filmmaker Marc Lawrence, with whom she had a daughter, actress Toni Lawrence (ex-wife of Billy Bob Thornton), and a son, artist Michael Lawrence.

== Biography ==
Fanya was born into a Jewish family in Odesa, Ukraine, in 1906, and moved to New York City with her family when she was a year old. Against her parents' wishes, she married her first husband, the writer Edward Dahlberg, while she was only 17; that marriage would end in divorce. As a talented young singer, she won a scholarship to Juilliard and toured Paris. She later married Gordon Kingman (this marriage also ended).

She returned to New York City and took a position as a librarian at Columbia University before she began working at The Brooklyn Eagle as a reporter and then became an editor at a publishing house, where she specialized in travel books. Her stint as a literary editor led her to some travels of her own; she left NYC with $25, determined to see the country. During this trip, she ended up working in various bookstores and art shops; while on the road, she learned one of her mystery thriller scripts had sold to RKO.

She met character actor Marc Lawrence while working in Hollywood; the pair were married in Las Vegas in 1942. After the 1940s, she concentrated primarily on writing television, although she did collaborate with her husband on films like 1965's Nightmare in the Sun and 1973's Pigs. The pair lived in Rome in the 1950s to avoid the Hollywood blacklist. Fanya was a member of the Screen Writers Guild.

She died in Palm Springs, California, on December 12, 1995.

== Selected filmography ==
- Pigs (1972)
- Nightmare in the Sun (1965)
- Why Girls Leave Home (1945)
- Hi Ya, Sailor (1943)
- The Stork Pays Off (1941)
- The Richest Man in Town (1941)
- Affectionately Yours (1941)
- Girls Under 21 (1940)
