= Affectionately Yours =

1941 film directed by Lloyd Bacon

- Directed by: Lloyd Bacon
- Screenplay by: Aleen Leslie; Edward Kaufman
- Story by: Fanya Foss
- Produced by: Hal B. Wallis
- Starring: Merle Oberon; Dennis Morgan; Rita Hayworth
- Cinematography: Tony Gaudio
- Edited by: Owen Marks
- Music by: Leo F. Forbstein
- Production company: Warner Bros. Pictures
- Distributed by: Warner Bros. Pictures
- Release date: May 10, 1941
- Running time: 88 minutes
- Country: United States
- Language: English

Affectionately Yours is a 1941 American romantic comedy film directed by Lloyd Bacon and starring Merle Oberon, Dennis Morgan, and Rita Hayworth. It was produced and distributed by Warner Bros. Pictures. Bette Davis was originally intended for the lead role but was replaced by Oberon.

== Plot ==
In this comedic film, renowned journalist Dennis Morgan endeavors to mend his relationship with his former wife, played by Merle Oberon. Dissatisfied with her husband's constant travel due to his job as a correspondent, Oberon's character travels to Reno, where she secures a divorce. While on a foreign assignment, Morgan becomes aware of their marriage's dissolution and becomes resolute in mending their relationship. Upon his return to the United States, he discovers she is now engaged to a character portrayed by Ralph Bellamy, a competing romantic interest. Simultaneously, Rita Hayworth, playing the role of a fellow journalist enamored with Morgan, pursues his affection. As is common in films of this kind, Oberon and Morgan's characters ultimately rediscover their past love.

== Cast ==
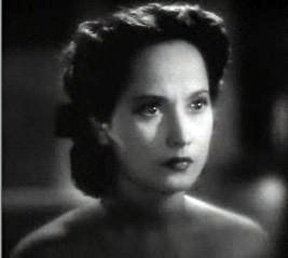
Merle Oberon from the film.

- Merle Oberon as Sue Mayberry
- Dennis Morgan as "Rickey" Mayberry
- Rita Hayworth as Irene Malcolm
- Ralph Bellamy as Owen Wright
- George Tobias as Pasha
- James Gleason as "Chet" Phillips
- Hattie McDaniel as Cynthia the cook
- Jerome Cowan as "Pappy" Cullen
- Butterfly McQueen as Butterfly
- Renie Riano as Mrs. Snell
- Frank Wilcox as "Tommy"
- Grace Stafford as "Chickie" Anderson
- Carmen Morales as Anita
- Murray Alper as Blair
- William Haade as Matthews
- Pat Flaherty as Harmon
- James Flavin as Tomassetti

Cast notes

- Uncredited actors in the film include Dorothy Adams, Sidney Bracey, Glen Cavender, Gino Corrado, Charles Drake, Faye Emerson, Frank Faylen, Mary Field, Edward Gargan, Fred Graham, Creighton Hale, Stuart Holmes, William Hopper, George Meeker, Jack Mower, Wedgwood Nowell, Alexis Smith, and Craig Stevens.

== Bibliography ==
- Bubbeo, Daniel. The Women of Warner Brothers: The Lives and Careers of 15 Leading Ladies, with Filmographies for Each. McFarland, 2001.
- Fetrow, Alan G. Feature Films, 1940-1949: a United States Filmography. McFarland, 1994.
