= Barbara Florian =

Swedish actress (born 1931)

- Born: 9 September 1931 (age 94); Stockholm, Sweden
- Other name: Barbara Elfvik
- Occupation: Actress
- Years active: 1950 - 1960 (film)

Barbara Florian (born 9 September 1931) is a Swedish retired film actress known for her work in Italian cinema.

== Selected filmography ==
- The Devil in the Convent (1950)
- Carcerato (1951)
- Rome-Paris-Rome (1951)
- Red Moon (1951)
- Girls Marked Danger (1952)
- Altri tempi (1952)
- I tre corsari (1952)
- Jolanda, the Daughter of the Black Corsair (1953)
- First Love (1959)

== Bibliography ==
- Small, Pauline. Sophia Loren: Moulding the Star. Intellect Books, 2009.
