= Hi'ya, Sailor =

1943 film directed by Jean Yarbrough

- Theatrical release poster
- Directed by: Jean Yarbrough
- Screenplay by: Stanley Roberts
- Story by: Fanya Foss
- Produced by: Jean Yarbrough
- Starring: Donald Woods; Elyse Knox; Eddie Quillan; Frank Jenks; Phyllis Brooks; Jerome Cowan
- Cinematography: Jack MacKenzie; Jerome Ash
- Edited by: William Austin
- Production company: Universal Pictures
- Distributed by: Universal Pictures
- Release date: October 8, 1943
- Running time: 63 minutes
- Country: United States
- Language: English

Hi'ya, Sailor is a 1943 American comedy film directed by Jean Yarbrough and written by Stanley Roberts. The film stars Donald Woods, Elyse Knox, Eddie Quillan, Frank Jenks, Phyllis Brooks and Jerome Cowan. The film was released on October 8, 1943, by Universal Pictures.

== Cast ==
- Donald Woods as Bob Jackson
- Elyse Knox as Pat Rogers
- Eddie Quillan as Corky Mills
- Frank Jenks as Deadpan Weaver
- Phyllis Brooks as Nanette
- Jerome Cowan as Lou Asher
- Matt Willis as Bull Rogan
- Florence Lake as Secretary
- Charles Coleman as Doorman
- Mantan Moreland as Sam
- Jack Mulhall as Police Lieutenant
- Ray Eberle as himself
- Wingy Manone as himself
- The Delta Rhythm Boys as Themselves
- Mayris Chaney as herself
- Leo Diamond as himself
- Eileen Nilsson as herself
- Elsa Nilsson as herself
