= Travis Banton =

American fashion designer

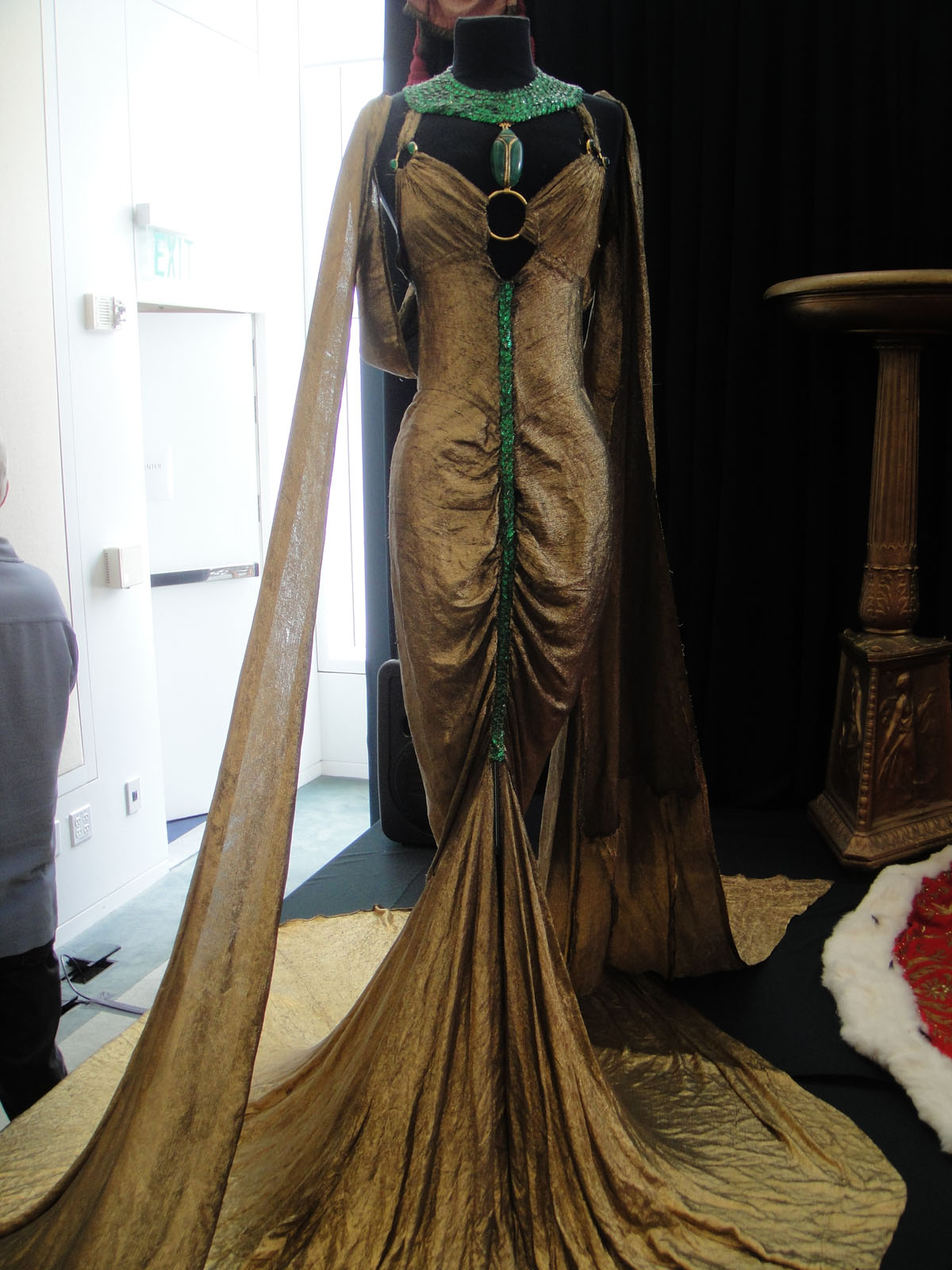
Travis Banton's design for Claudette Colbert in the title role of Cleopatra (1934)

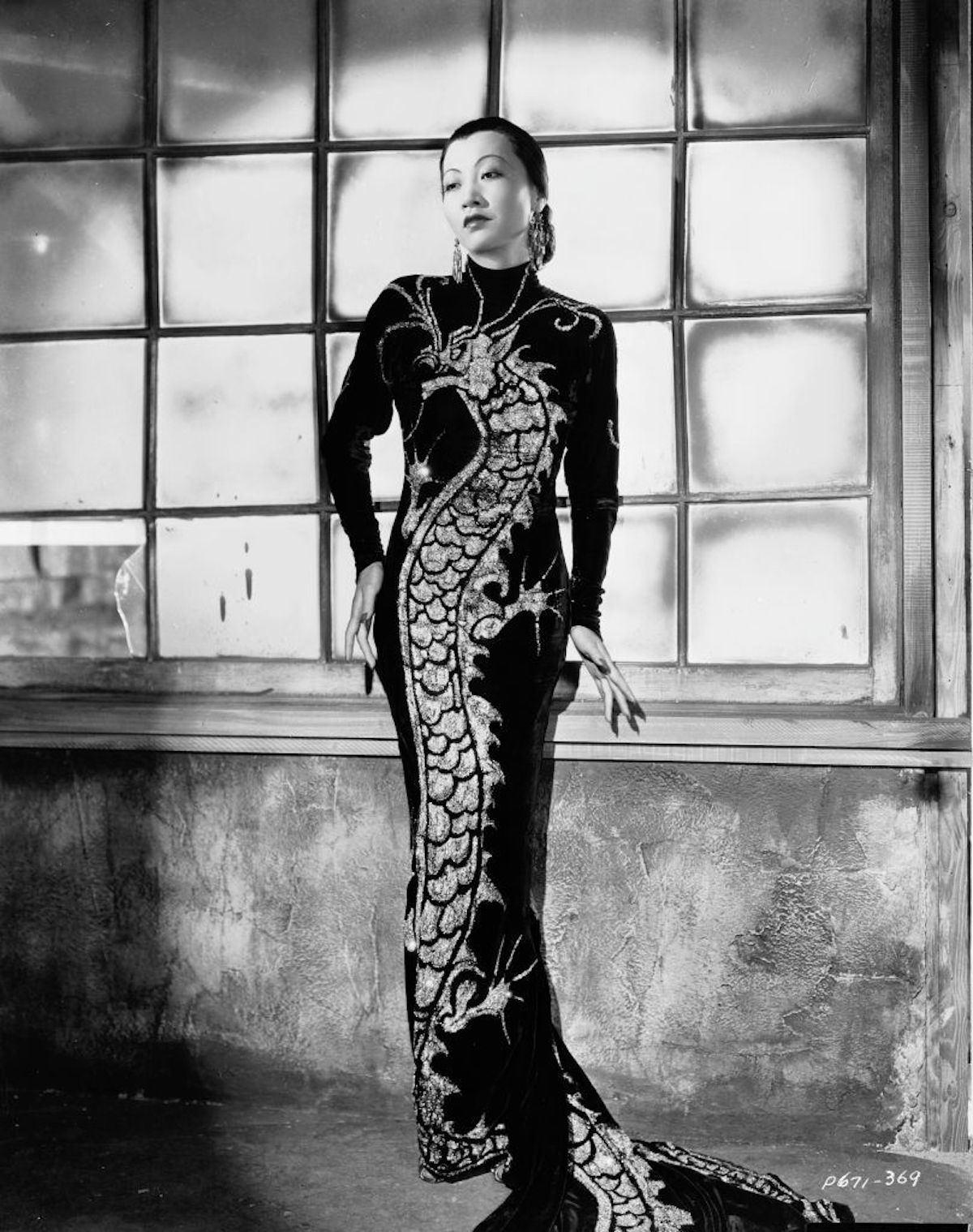
Anna May Wong wearing Travis Banton in Limehouse Blues (1934)

Travis Banton (August 18, 1894 – February 2, 1958) was an American costume designer. He is perhaps best known for his long collaboration with actress Marlene Dietrich and director Josef von Sternberg. He is generally considered one of the most important Hollywood costume designers of the golden age.

Born in Waco, Texas, Banton moved to New York City as a child. He was educated at Columbia University and at the Art Students League of New York, where he studied art and fashion design.

An early apprenticeship with a high-society costume dressmaker earned him fame. His reputation was established when Mary Pickford selected one of his dresses for her wedding to Douglas Fairbanks.

He opened his dressmaking salon in New York City, and he was asked to create costumes for the Ziegfeld Follies. In 1924, Banton moved to Hollywood when Paramount contracted with him to create costumes for The Dressmaker from Paris, his first film.

Beginning with Norma Talmadge in Poppy, Banton designed clothing for Pola Negri and Clara Bow in the 1920s. In the 1930s and 1940s, Banton designed for Kay Francis, Lilyan Tashman, Sylvia Sidney, Gail Patrick, Helen Vinson, and Claudette Colbert. Ultimately, Banton may be best remembered for forging the style of Carole Lombard, Marlene Dietrich, and Mae West. Dietrich and Banton had an especially close and successful collaboration. His work for Dietrich frequently is referenced by designers.

Glamour, subtle elegance, and exquisite fabrics endeared Banton to Hollywood's celebrated beauties and made him one of the sought-after costume designers of his era. As viewings of such films as The Gilded Lily (1935) and Desire (1936) reveal, his costume designs were marked by form-flattering cuts (often on the bias), rich fabrics (such as satin and lamé), and extravagant textures (beads, fur, and feathers). He collaborated closely with directors and actresses in order to fulfil their vision.

When designer Howard Greer left Paramount, Banton was promoted to head designer and was responsible for dressing the studio's stars. Because of his worsening alcoholism, and according to some commentators, at the instigation of his assistant Edith Head, Banton was forced to leave Paramount. He returned to designing privately for loyal stars and occasionally designed for Twentieth Century-Fox from 1939 to 1941 and Universal from 1945 to 1948.

== Notable design projects ==
- Clara Bow in It and Wings, 1927
- Kay Francis in Trouble in Paradise, 1932
- Mae West in I'm No Angel, 1933, and Belle of the Nineties, 1934
- Claudette Colbert in Cleopatra, 1934
- Loretta Young in The Crusades, 1935
- Marlene Dietrich in Morocco, 1930, Blonde Venus, 1932, Shanghai Express, 1932, The Scarlet Empress, 1934, and The Devil Is a Woman, 1935
- Carole Lombard in My Man Godfrey, 1936, Nothing Sacred, 1937, and Made for Each Other, 1939
- Dolores Costello in Yours for the Asking, 1936
- Linda Darnell in The Mark of Zorro, 1940
- Alice Faye in Lillian Russell and Tin Pan Alley, 1940
- Carmen Miranda in Down Argentine Way, 1940, and That Night in Rio, 1941
- Linda Darnell and Rita Hayworth in Blood and Sand, 1941
- Betty Grable in Moon Over Miami, 1941
- Rita Hayworth in Cover Girl, 1944
- Joan Bennett in Scarlet Street, 1945
- Merle Oberon in A Song to Remember, 1945
- Lucille Ball in Lover Come Back, 1946
- Joan Fontaine in Letter from an Unknown Woman, 1948
