= Girls Marked Danger =

1952 crime film

- Theatrical release poster
- Directed by: Luigi Comencini
- Produced by: Dino De Laurentiis; Carlo Ponti
- Starring: Eleonora Rossi Drago; Marc Lawrence; Ettore Manni; Tamara Lees; Barbara Florian; Silvana Pampanini; Vittorio Gassman
- Edited by: Nino Baragli
- Music by: Armando Trovaioli
- Release date: 1952
- Running time: 97 minutes; 75 minutes (U.S.)
- Countries: Italy; United States
- Language: Italian

La tratta delle bianche ("The Trade in White Women") is a 1952 Italian-language crime-melodrama film directed by Luigi Comencini. It stars Eleonora Rossi Drago, Marc Lawrence, Ettore Manni, Tamara Lees, Barbara Florian, Silvana Pampanini, and Vittorio Gassman.

In 1954, the film was released in the United States as Girls Marked Danger. For its American release, the film was dubbed in English.

== Plot ==
A man invites Italian women to become cabaret dancers in South America, but he is actually forcing them into sexual slavery.

== Cast ==
- Eleonora Rossi Drago as Aida
- Marc Lawrence as Manfredi
- Ettore Manni as Carlo
- Silvana Pampanini as Lucia
- Vittorio Gassman as Michele
- Tamara Lees as Clara
- Antonio Nicotra as Bernardino
- Barbara Florian as Fanny
- Ignazio Balsamo as Stefano
- Franco Bologna as Marco
- Gianni Bonos as Tonino
- Sophia Loren as Elvira
- Enrico Maria Salerno as Giorgio
- Duilio D'Amore as Luciano
- Maria Zanoli as Giulia

== Production ==
Sophia Loren had a small role in the film as a fainting dancer in a marathon. Despite her minor role, Loren appeared in advertisements for the film's release in the United States. The only well-known American member of the cast was Marc Lawrence, who had moved to Rome from Hollywood after being called before the House Un-American Activities Committee, but many of the Italian cast were also already known to Americans. The film was dubbed into English for its U.S. release.

== Reception ==
George Burke, of the Miami Herald, said, "It is possible that Girls Marked Danger had some merit before it was dubbed with English dialogue that is not always in the mood or movement of the action".

In 1959, Pope John XXIII had the Catholic Church's National Legion of Decency classify films for the Association of Catholic Motion Picture Theater Operators of Italy's anniversary. Catholics were not supposed to watch those classified as morally objectionable. The article for Girls Marked Danger stated: "Objection: The theme of this picture employs throughout material morally unsuitable for entertainment motion picture theaters. Moreover, in treatment, it contains offensive and suggestive sequences." The National Legion of Decency is now known as the National Catholic Office for Motion Pictures.

Advertising material for the film's theatrical release is held at the Harry Ransom Center at the University of Texas at Austin within its Hoblitzelle Interstate Theatre Circuit Advertising Collection.
