= Marc Lawrence =

American actor and director (1910–2005)

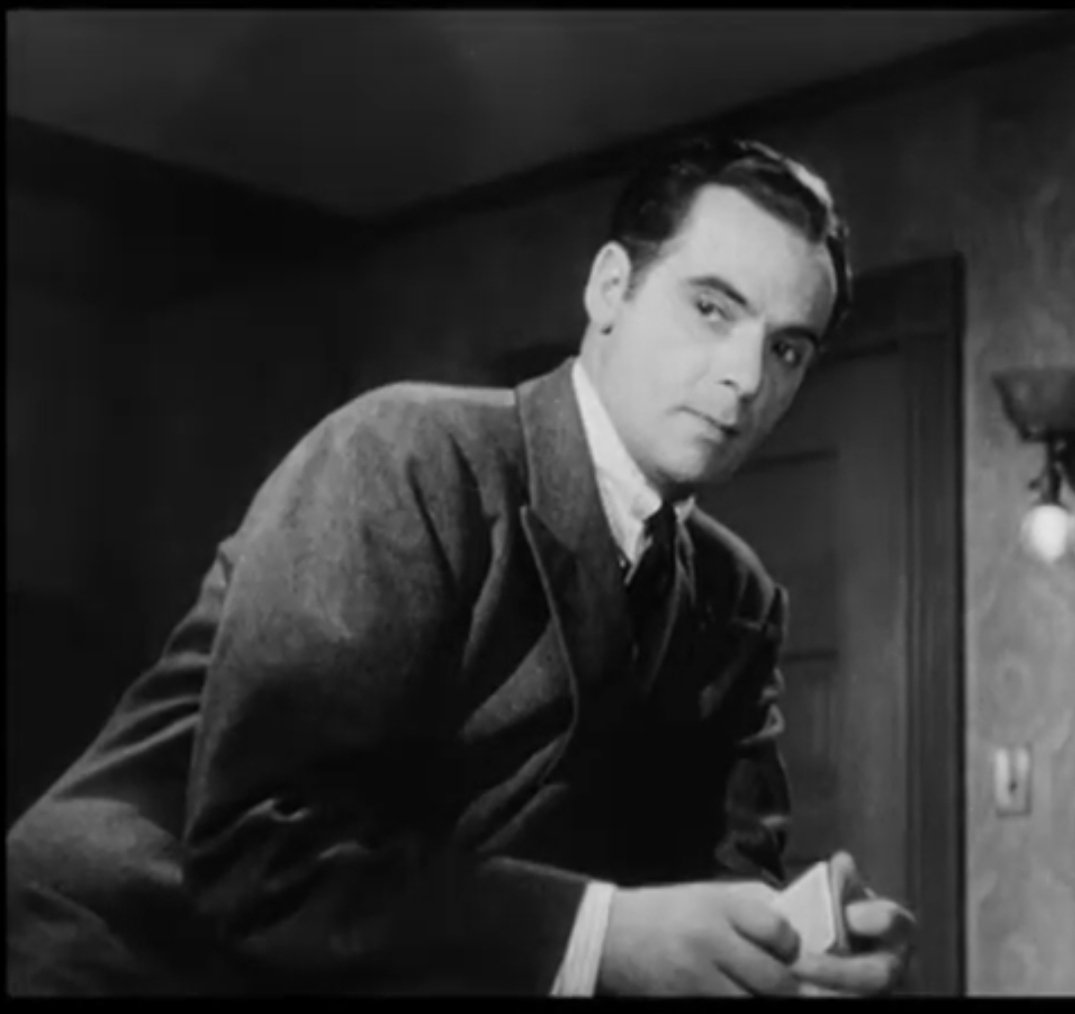
- Lawrence in Dillinger (1945)
- Born: Max Goldsmith; February 17, 1909; New York City, New York, U.S.
- Died: November 28, 2005 (aged 96); Palm Springs, California, U.S.
- Resting place: Westwood Village Memorial Park Cemetery
- Other names: F. A. Foss; Marc Laurence; Marc C. Lawrence
- Education: City College of New York
- Occupations: Actor, film director, television director
- Years active: 1930–2003
- Spouses: Fanya Foss (m. 1942; died 1995) Alicia Lawrence (m. 2003)
- Children: 2
- Relatives: Billy Bob Thornton (son-in-law)

Marc Lawrence (born Max Goldsmith; February 17, 1909 – November 28, 2005) was an American actor and director, known for his character roles as gangsters and other underworld types. He appeared in over 200 film, television, and stage productions between 1932 and 2002.

== Early life and education ==
Lawrence was born Max Goldsmith in New York City, the son of a Polish Jewish mother, Minerva Norma (née Sugarman), and a Russian Jewish father, Israel Simon Goldsmith. He participated in plays in school, then attended the City College of New York. In 1930, he received a two-year scholarship to the repertory theater operated by Eva Le Gallienne. While there, he befriended John Garfield, and appeared with him in Group Theatre productions.

== Career ==
Lawrence's film debut came in 1933. His pock-marked complexion, brooding appearance, and New York street-guy accent made him a natural for heavies, and he would portray scores of gangsters and mob bosses over the next six decades. He was once informed by studio executive Harry Cohn that infamous mobster Johnny Roselli called Lawrence "the best hood in films". Lawrence himself added that many Italian hoods told him he played them better than anyone else. While living in Italy, Lawrence befriended Lucky Luciano, who said that his "exaggerated" New York accent helped ease the mobster's homesickness.

In 1951, Lawrence found himself under scrutiny for his political past. After being visited at his L.A. home by two government agents who accused him of being a Communist Party USA (CPUSA) member, Lawrence was subpoenaed by the House Un-American Activities Committee (HUAC). On April 24, 1951, he appeared before the HUAC and admitted he had belonged to the CPUSA in the late 1930s. He named fourteen of his film industry associates as Communists, including fellow actors J. Edward Bromberg, Morris Carnovsky, Jeff Corey, Howard da Silva, Lloyd Gough, Sterling Hayden, Larry Parks, Anne Revere, and Lionel Stander.

Despite being a cooperative witness, Lawrence did not fully escape the blacklist, and so he and his wife, screenwriter Fanya Foss, and their two children departed for Italy in 1951. They lived abroad for six years. During that time, he appeared in numerous Italian films and also landed the role of Diomedes in Robert Wise's Helen of Troy (1956). In 1957, he went to England to star in a production of A View from the Bridge, directed by Sam Wanamaker.

Once the blacklist eased for Lawrence in the late 1950s, he and his family moved back to the U.S. He initially obtained guest spots on TV series such as The Detectives and The Untouchables. He later resumed his position in films as a familiar and talented purveyor of gangland types. He played gangsters in two James Bond movies: 1971's Diamonds Are Forever opposite Sean Connery, and 1974's The Man with the Golden Gun opposite Roger Moore. He also portrayed a henchman opposite Laurence Olivier in Marathon Man (1976) and a stereotypical Miami mob boss alongside Jerry Reed and Dom DeLuise in the comedy Hot Stuff (1979).

Lawrence also had occasional directing credits, including on Nightmare in the Sun (1965) and Pigs (1973), as well as on episodes of TV series such as Lawman, The Roaring 20's, 77 Sunset Strip, and Maverick. Among his later acting jobs, he played Volnoth, a member of the Gatherers, in the 1989 Star Trek: The Next Generation episode "The Vengeance Factor". He was the elderly motel owner in From Dusk till Dawn (1996). He returned to the Star Trek franchise when he portrayed Mr. Zeemo in the Star Trek: Deep Space Nine episode "Badda-Bing Badda-Bang", which aired in February 1999. His final film acting performance was in Looney Tunes Back in Action (2003), appearing as an Acme Corporation vice president.

Lawrence was also been credited as F. A. Foss, Marc Laurence and Marc C. Lawrence.

== Books ==
Lawrence's autobiography, Long Time No See: Confessions of a Hollywood Gangster (ISBN 0-9636700-0-X), was published in 1991. He was also the subject of a novel, The Beautiful and the Profane (ISBN 978-1-4107-0292-0) (published in 2002).

== Personal life ==
In 1942, he married screenwriter Fanya Foss. They had two children. Foss died in 1995. His daughter Toni was married to Billy Bob Thornton from 1986 to 1988. In 2003, at the age of 93, Lawrence married a Mexican woman named Alicia, who had a daughter from a prior marriage.

=== Death ===
On November 28, 2005, Marc Lawrence died of heart failure at his Palm Springs home. He was 95. Lawrence and his first wife, Fanya, are buried in Westwood Village Memorial Park in Los Angeles.

== Filmography ==
=== Film ===
Year	Title	Role	Notes
1932	If I Had a Million	Henchman of Mike The Gangster	
1933	Gambling Ship	Hood	
1933	Her First Mate	Orderly With Message	
1933	Lady for a Day	Nick/Mug At Reception	
1933	White Woman	Connors	
1934	Straight Is the Way	Monk's Henchmen	
1934	Death on the Diamond	Bookies' Doorman	
1934	Million Dollar Baby	Gangster	
1935	G Men	Gangster Killed At Lodge	
1935	Go Into Your Dance	Eddie Logan	
1935	Strangers All	Communist Meeting Chairman	
1935	Men of the Hour	Joe	
1935	The Arizonian	Henchman Who Pistol-Whipped Clay	
1935	Don't Bet on Blondes	Gangster #6	
1935	After the Dance	Tom/Prisoner	
1935	Little Big Shot	Doré's Henchman	
1935	Dr. Socrates	"Lefty" Croger/Gangster	
1935	Three Kids and a Queen	Gangster	
1936	Road Gang	Pete	
1936	Don't Gamble with Love	Gambler	
1936	Desire	Charles/The Valet	
1936	Love on a Bet	County Fair Barker	
1936	Robin Hood of El Dorado	Manuel	
1936	Under Two Flags	Grivon	
1936	Counterfeit	Dint Coleman	
1936	Trapped by Television	Frank Griffin	
1936	The Final Hour	Mike Magellon	
1936	Blackmailer	"Pinky"	
1936	The Cowboy Star	Johnny Sampson	
1936	Charlie Chan at the Opera	Usher	
1936	Night Waitress	Dorn	
1937	Racketeers in Exile	"Blackie" White	
1937	Motor Madness	Gus Slater	
1937	I Promise to Pay	Henchman Whitehat	
1937	Criminals of the Air	"Blast" Reardon	
1937	San Quentin	Venetti	
1937	What Price Vengeance?	Pete Brower	
1937	It Can't Last Forever	Hoodlum	
1937	A Dangerous Adventure	Calkins	
1937	Charlie Chan on Broadway	Thomas Mitchell	
1937	Life Begins with Love	Pearson	
1937	Counsel for Crime	Edwin Mitchell	
1937	Murder in Greenwich Village	Rusty Morgan	
1937	The Shadow	Kid Crow	
1938	Penitentiary	Jack Hawkins	
1938	Who Killed Gail Preston?	Frank Daniels	
1938	Squadron of Honor	Lawlor	
1938	Convicted	Milton Militis	
1938	I Am the Law	Eddie Girard	
1938	The Spider's Web	Steve Harmon	
1938	Adventure in Sahara	Poule	
1938	While New York Sleeps	Happy Nelson	
1938	There's That Woman Again	Stevens	
1938	Charlie Chan in Honolulu	Johnny McCoy	
1939	Homicide Bureau	Chuck Brown	
1939	Blackwell's Island	Convict Upstairs Shouting During Inspection	
1939	The Lone Wolf Spy Hunt	Henchman In Trenchcoat	
1939	Sergeant Madden	"Piggy" Ceders	
1939	Romance of the Redwoods	Joe	
1939	Code of the Streets	Henchman Halstead aka Denver Collins	
1939	Blind Alley	Buck	
1939	Ex-Champ	Bill Crosley/Olsen's Manager	
1939	S.O.S. Tidal Wave	Melvin Sutter	
1939	Dust Be My Destiny	Venetti	
1939	Think First!	Joe	Short
1939	Beware Spooks!	Slick Eastman	
1939	The Housekeeper's Daughter	Floyd	
1939	Invisible Stripes	Lefty	
1940	Johnny Apollo	Harry Bates	
1940	Love, Honor and Oh-Baby!	Tony Luffo	
1940	The Man Who Talked Too Much	Lefty Kyler	
1940	The Golden Fleecing	"Happy" Dugan	
1940	Brigham Young	Prosecutor	
1940	The Great Profile	Tony	
1940	Charlie Chan at the Wax Museum	Steve McBirney	
1941	Tall, Dark and Handsome	Louie	
1941	The Monster and the Girl	Sleeper	
1941	The Man Who Lost Himself	Frank DeSoto	
1941	The Shepherd of the Hills	Pete Matthews	
1941	Blossoms in the Dust	LaVerne	
1941	Lady Scarface	Lefty Landers	
1941	Hold That Ghost	Charlie Smith	
1941	A Dangerous Game	Joe	
1941	Sundown	Abdi Hammud	
1941	Public Enemies	Mike	
1942	Nazi Agent	Joe Aiello	
1942	Yokel Boy	Henchman Trigger	
1942	This Gun for Hire	Tommy	
1942	Call of the Canyon	Horace Dunston	
1942	Eyes of the Underworld	Gordon Finch	
1942	'Neath Brooklyn Bridge	McGaffey	
1943	Calaboose	Sluggsy Baker	
1943	Submarine Alert	Vincent Bela	
1943	The Ox-Bow Incident	Jeff Farnley	
1943	Hit the Ice	Phil	
1944	Tampico	Valdez	
1944	Rainbow Island	Alcoa	
1944	The Princess and the Pirate	Pedro	
1945	Flame of Barbary Coast	Joe Disko	
1945	Dillinger	Doc Madison	
1945	Don't Fence Me In	Clifford Anson	
1945	Club Havana	Joe Reed	
1945	Life with Blondie	Pete, Blackie's Henchman	
1946	Blonde Alibi	Joe DeRita	
1946	The Virginian	Pete	
1946	Inside Job	Donovan	
1946	Cloak and Dagger	Luigi	
1947	Yankee Fakir	Duke	
1947	Joe Palooka in the Knockout	John Mitchell	
1947	Unconquered	Sioto the Medicine Man	
1947	Captain from Castile	Corio	
1947	I Walk Alone	Nick Palestro	
1948	Key Largo	Ziggy	
1948	Out of the Storm	Red Stubbins	
1949	Jigsaw	Angelo Agostini	
1949	Calamity Jane and Sam Bass	Harry Dean	
1949	Tough Assignment	Vince	
1950	Black Hand	Caesar Xavier Serpi	
1950	The Asphalt Jungle	Cobby	
1950	The Desert Hawk	Samad	
1950	Abbott and Costello in the Foreign Legion	Frankie the Loan Shark	
1951	Hurricane Island	Angus MacReady	
1951	My Favorite Spy	Ben Ali	
1952	Vacation with a Gangster	Jack Mariotti	
1952	Torment of the Past	Andrea Rossi	
1952	Girls Marked Danger	Manchedi	
1952	The Three Pirates	Van Gould	
1952	Brothers of Italy	Il Capitano March	
1953	Jolanda, the Daughter of the Black Corsair	Van Gould	
1953	Noi peccatori	Camillo	
1953	Legione straniera	Sergeant Schwartz	
1953	Funniest Show on Earth	Il Proprietario Del Circo	
1955	New Moon	Pierre	
1955	Suor Maria	Don Mario, Proprietario Del Night Club	
1955	La catena dell'odio	Braschi	
1955	Tragic Ballad	Felipe Alvaro	
1956	Helen of Troy	Diomedes	
1957	Kill Her Gently	William Connors	
1963	Johnny Cool	Johnny Colini	
1963	Recoil	Marcus Maroon	
1966	Due mafiosi contro Al Capone	Joe Minasi	
1966	Savage Pampas	Sergeant Barril	
1966	Johnny Tiger	William Billie	
1966	7 monaci d'oro	Lucky Marciano, Capo Da Banda	
1967	Custer of the West	Gold Miner	
1967	Du mou dans la gâchette	Magnum	
1968	Kong Island	Albert Muller	
1968	Krakatoa, East of Java	Jacobs	
1970	The Kremlin Letter	The Priest	
1970	Dream No Evil	The Undertaker	
1971	Diamonds Are Forever	Slumber Inc. Attendant	
1973	Honor Thy Father	Stefano Magaddino	TV movie
1973	Daddy's Deadly Darling	Zambrini	
1973	Frasier, the Sensuous Lion	Chiarelli	
1974	The Man with the Golden Gun	Rodney	
1976	Marathon Man	Erhard	
1977	A Piece of the Action	Louie	
1978	Foul Play	Stiltskin	
1978	Goin' Coconuts	Webster	
1979	Hot Stuff	Carmine	
1979	Swap Meet	Mr. Booth	
1980	Super Fuzz	Tony Torpedo	
1980	Cataclysm	Abraham Weiss/Dieter	
1982	Terror at Alcatraz	Daniel Ginelli	TV movie
1983	Cat and Dog	Don Salvatore Licuti	
1983	Savage Journey	Chief Walker	TV movie
1985	Night Train to Terror	Mr. Weiss/Dieter	
1986	The Big Easy	Vinnie "The Cannon" DiMotti	
1989	Blood Red	Michael Fazio	
1990	Donor	Ben Beloit	TV movie
1992	Ruby	Santos Alicante	
1992	Newsies	Kloppman	
1994	Marilyn, My Love	Tony Luca	
1995	Four Rooms	Sam the Bellhop	
1996	From Dusk till Dawn	Old Timer Motel Owner	
1996	Gotti	Carlo "Don Carlo" Gambino	TV movie
1999	End of Days	Old Man	
2001	The Shipping News	Cousin Nolan	
2003	Looney Tunes: Back in Action	Acme VP, Stating The Obvious	

=== Television ===
Year	Title	Role	Notes
1949	Don Lee Television Workshop	-	Episode: "Shoes and Souls"
1955	Studio One	Cow Nelson	Episode: "A Terrible Day"
1958	Wagon Train	First Mate Ferris	Episode: "Around the Horn"
1958	Playhouse 90	Scarface	Episode: "Days of Wine and Roses"
1958	Playhouse 90	The Cajun	Episode: "Old Man"
1958	The Rifleman	Gavin	Episode: "The Safe Guard"
1959	Playhouse 90	Pardo	Episode: "Child of Our Time"
1959	Peter Gunn	Max Grayco	Episode: "Vendetta"
1959	M Squad	Vince Cronin	Episode: "Jeopardy by Fire"
1959	Tightrope!	Frankie Farrell	Episode: "Man in the Middle"
1959	Johnny Staccato	Vic	Episode: "The Unwise Men"
1959	This Man Dawson	Jenkins	Episode: "Copkiller"
1959	Shotgun Slade	Gideon Finch	Episode: "Mesa of Missing Men"
1960	The Troubleshooters	Bob Blossom	Episode: "High Steel"
1960	Dick Powell's Zane Grey Theatre	Wade Migill	Episode: "Killer Instinct"
1960	Bronco	Joe Russo	Episode: "Tangled Trail"
1960	Richard Diamond, Private Detective	Vito Doria	Episode: "Running Scared"
1960	The Rifleman	Cougar	Episode: "Trail of Hate"
1960	The Detectives	Rocco Silvano	Episode: "Life in the Balance"
1960	The Detectives	Ed Watkins	Episode: "The Other Side"
1960	The Untouchables	Luigi Renaldo	Episode: "Star Witness"
1961	The Deputy	Alvy Burke	Episode: "The Hard Decision"
1961	Lawman	Frank Walker	Episode: "Homecoming"
1961	Whispering Smith	Frankie Wisdom	Episode: "Death at Even Money"
1961	The Untouchables	Mike Genna	Episode: "The Genna Brothers"
1962	The Detectives	Marcus Maroon	Episode: "Three Blind Mice: Part 1 & 2"
1963	The Untouchables	Lou Cagan	Episode: "Blues for a Gone Goose"
1964	Arrest and Trial	Leo Tucci	Episode: "Tigers Are for Jungles"
1964	Bob Hope Presents the Chrysler Theatre	Orente	Episode: "A Wind of Hurricane Force"
1964	Bob Hope Presents the Chrysler Theatre	Plato Atutle	Episode: "The Timothy Heist"
1965	Petticoat Junction	Barney Dawson	Episode: "Hooterville Crime Wave"
1965	Mister Ed	Spike the Bank Robber	Episode: "The Bank Robbery"
1966	The Rat Patrol	Abu Hassan	Episode: "The Moment of Truce Raid"
1969	Mannix	Angelo Palerma	Episode: "The Nowhere Victim"
1970	Bonanza	Red Gaskell	Episode: "Caution, Easter Bunny Crossing"
1970	Here's Lucy	Joe Grapefruit	Episode: "Lucy and Ma Parker"
1971	The Partners	Kelso	Episode: "The Prisoner of Fender"
1971	Here's Lucy	Ruby	Episode: "Lucy and Mannix Are Held Hostage"
1971	The Doris Day Show	Frankie Fury	Episode: "The Wings of An Angel"
1971	Mannix	Ty Webber	Episode: "Overkill"
1972	Nichols	Prouty	Episode: "Zachariah"
1974	Mannix	Al Stanick	Episode: "A Fine Day for Dying"
1974	McCloud	Vito Gilardi	Episode: "The Gang That Stole Manhattan"
1975	Switch	Franks	Episode: "Las Vegas Roundabout"
1975	Switch	Don Vincenzo	Episode: "Kiss of Death"
1976	The Rookies	Roger Marsten	Episode: "Journey to Oblivion"
1976	Baretta	Linsky	Episode: "Street Edition"
1978	CHiPs	Co-Driver	Episode: "Crack-Up"
1979	Wonder Woman	Mr. Jones	Episode: "Going, Going, Gone"
1979	The Dukes of Hazzard	Rostosky	Episode: "The Meeting"
1986	The A-Team	Sam Marlini	Episode: "A Little Town with an Accent"
1989	Star Trek: The Next Generation	Volnath	Episode: "The Vengeance Factor"
1990	Shannon's Deal	Abe the Just	Episode: "Art"
1990	Gabriel's Fire	Carlo Musamina	Episode: "To Catch a Con: Part II"
1998	ER	Mr. Newton	Episode: "Shades of Gray"
1999	Star Trek: Deep Space Nine	Mr. Zeemo	Episode: "Badda-Bing, Badda-Bang"

=== Video Game ===
Year	Title	Role	Notes
1994	Metaltech: Earthsiege	Pilot #5	

== Partial stage credits ==
- Romeo and Juliet (1930, Civic Repertory Theatre, New York) - Watchman
- The Tree (1932, Park Lane Theatre, New York) - Judd
- The Survivors (1948, Playhouse Theatre, New York) - Rutson Hedge
- A View from the Bridge (1957, New Shakespeare Theatre, Liverpool) - Eddie Carbone
