= Pigs (1973 film) =

1973 American horror film by Marc Lawrence

- Promotional release poster
- Directed by: Marc Lawrence
- Written by: Marc Lawrence; Fanya Foss
- Produced by: Marc Lawrence; Donald Reynolds
- Starring: Toni Lawrence; Marc Lawrence; Jesse Vint; Paul Hickey; Katharine Ross
- Cinematography: Irv Goodnoff; Glenn Roland
- Edited by: Irv Goodnoff
- Music by: Charles Bernstein
- Distributed by: Troma Entertainment
- Release date: May 23, 1973
- Running time: 80 minutes
- Language: English

Pigs is a 1973 American psychological horror film co-written, co-produced, and directed by Marc Lawrence and currently distributed by Troma Entertainment. The film stars Toni Lawrence.

Pigs premiered on May 23, 1973 in Detroit, Michigan under the title The Pigs. The film then received a theatrical release in 1984 as Daddy's Deadly Darling, and has been re-released under a number of other titles, including Daddy's Girl, The 13th Pig, Blood Pen, Horror Farm, Roadside Torture Chamber, The Killer, The Killers, Lynn Hart, The Strange Love Exorcist, Lynn Hart, the Strange Love Exorcist, The Strange Exorcism of Lynn Hart and The Secret of Lynn Hart.

== Plot ==
A man named Zambrini lives in a rural California area and operates a small, isolated diner catering to local oil workers. He also feeds fresh corpses (apparently acquired by grave robbing) to a pen of 12 pigs that he keeps behind the diner. Two spinster neighbors, Miss Macy and her sister Annette, suspect Zambrini of feeding human corpses to the pigs, but cannot convince the local sheriff Dan Cole, who constantly investigates their claims but cannot get Zambrini to admit to anything. Miss Macy tells him that whenever Zambrini feeds a new corpse to the pigs, there is a new pig in the pen the next day.

Into this mix comes a young woman named Lynn Webster, a stranger who comes to the diner looking for work and a place to stay. Zambrini immediately gives her a room and a job as a waitress, asking no questions about who she is or where she comes from. After a nightmare where Zambrini attacks her with a straight razor, Lynn attempts to investigate the pigpen behind the diner and is intercepted by Zambrini, who ominously warns her never to go back there.

Lynn attracts the attention of local oil worker Ben, who pursues her for a date. After politely rebuffing his advances, Lynn finally relents after Ben reveals that he found an abandoned nurse's uniform in a nearby field, suggesting that Lynn is on the run from something that she does not want to be revealed. After Ben takes her out in his truck and attempts to rape her, Lynn invites him back to her room at the diner and murders him with a straight razor. Zambrini finds her and cleans up all evidence of the crime, feeding Ben's dismembered corpse to the pigs. Lynn seems to have only fleeting memories of her crime, and she continues making one-sided phone calls to her father, promising to return to him.

A man named Jess Winter arrives in town searching for Lynn. Once he makes contact with her at the diner, he reveals to Zambrini that Lynn has escaped from a mental institution; she is a dangerously disturbed psychopath due to being raped by her own father, whom she stabbed to death. Winter tries to get her to go back with him, and she agrees, but when Zambrini tells her that he wants her to stay, Lynn stabs Winter to death.

Winter's disappearance triggers an investigation that reveals Lynn's past to Cole. When he discovers that she is an escaped mental patient, he calls the diner to warn Zambrini before rushing out there to apprehend Lynn. Instead, Zambrini warns her and attempts to hide her from the police, but she stabs him to death before he can get her to leave. She makes one last phone call to her father, and this time we hear that she has been talking to an automated recording for a disconnected phone number. Suddenly, the pigs invade the diner, presumably attacking Lynn. Cole arrives on the scene too late and seemingly discovers the aftermath. As the pigs are being loaded into a truck the next day to be taken for slaughter, Cole realizes that there are now 13 full-sized pigs instead of 12.

== Cast ==
- Toni Lawrence as Lynn Webster
- Jesse Vint as Sheriff Dan Cole
- Catherine Ross as Miss Macy (credited as Katherine Ross)
- Paul Hickey as Ben Sharp
- Iris Korn as Annette
- Walter Barnes as Doctor
- Erik Holland as Hoagy
- William Michael as Deputy
- Jim Antonio as Jess Winter - Man from Hospital
- Bone Adams as Truck Farmer
- Larry Hussmann as Gas Attendant
- Don Skylar as Oil Worker
- Marc Lawrence as Zambrini

== Release ==
Pigs premiered on May 23, 1973 in Detroit, Michigan under the title The Pigs, and according to Lawrence, the distributor offered free bacon to the audience at the event, most of which was quietly and cautiously returned after it was over. In late 1973, Lawrence sold the film to producer William Rowland, who created a new ad campaign for it, retitled it The Secret of Lynn Hart and positioned it as a slasher film. Shortly thereafter, the success of The Exorcist inspired Rowland to add a possession element to the film; Lawrence was brought in to film a new opening to it depicting an exorcism being performed on Lynn, who escapes. The rest of the film plays out as normal, with no further mention of possession or the supernatural. This new version was retitled Lynn Hart, The Strange Love Exorcist, often shortened to simply Love Exorcist in certain territories. This cut of the film also appeared under the alternate title Blood Pen in 1976. In 1977, Donald Reynolds removed the exorcism scene and filmed an additional prologue and epilogue for the film that initially played under the title Daddy's Girl. After shortening the prologue from Reynolds' cut, the film was released theatrically on November 6, 1984 by Aquarius Releasing as Daddy's Deadly Darling.

== Reception ==
Bill Gibron of DVD Talk wrote that the film "plays like a schizophrenic's version of The Farmer's Almanac", and lamented the lack of "killer swine" in the film. Brian Orndorf of Blu-ray.com wrote that the film "isn't the animals-gone-wild adventure it might appear to be", but commended the film for "exploring the destruction of sexual abuse, the pain of isolation, and crumbling of untreated minds."
