= The Three Pirates =

- Directed by: Mario Soldati
- Produced by: Dino De Laurentiis and Carlo Ponti
- Cinematography: Tonino Delli Colli
- Edited by: Leo Catozzo
- Music by: Nino Rota
- Release date: 1952
- Country: Italy
- Language: Italian

The Three Pirates (Italian: I tre corsari) is a 1952 Italian adventure film directed by Mario Soldati. It is based on a novel by Emilio Salgari.

== Cast ==
- Ettore Manni: Il Corsaro Nero - Enrico di Ventimiglia
- Marc Lawrence: Van Gould
- Barbara Florian: Isabella
- Renato Salvatori: Il Corsaro Rosso - Rolando di Ventimiglia
- Cesare Danova: Il Corsaro Verde - Carlo di Ventimiglia
- Alberto Sorrentino: Agonia
- Gualtiero Tumiati: Comte di Ventimiglia
- Ignazio Balsamo: Van Stiller
- Joop van Hulzen: Vice-roi de S.M.
- Ubaldo Lay: Il carceriere Alvaro
- Tiberio Mitri: Jordan Graumont
