= Apollodorus the Sicilian =

Hellenistic Egyptian

Apollodorus (Greek: Ἀπολλόδωρος) was a loyal follower of the Egyptian Queen Cleopatra VII. In 48 BC he is supposed to have enabled Cleopatra to get in the palace of Alexandria to Julius Caesar and in this way to strengthen decisively her position in the power struggle with her brother Ptolemy XIII.

== Life ==
Apollodorus was believed to have been originally a servant of Egyptian race of Cleopatra VII who gained her trust and rose to power to become her adviser as mentioned by historian Plutarch.

When Caesar came to Alexandria in the summer of 48 BC he summoned the estranged Ptolemaic brother and sister to submit to his decision. Ptolemy XIII was at this time with his army at the Egyptian border near Pelusium opposite the troops of Cleopatra. He was the first to go to Caesar.

Cleopatra first sent negotiators to explain her point of view but, according to the historian Cassius Dio, she soon became convinced that if she came personally she could more easily win the Roman ruler over by her charm and beauty. Caesar promised her a confidential conversation.

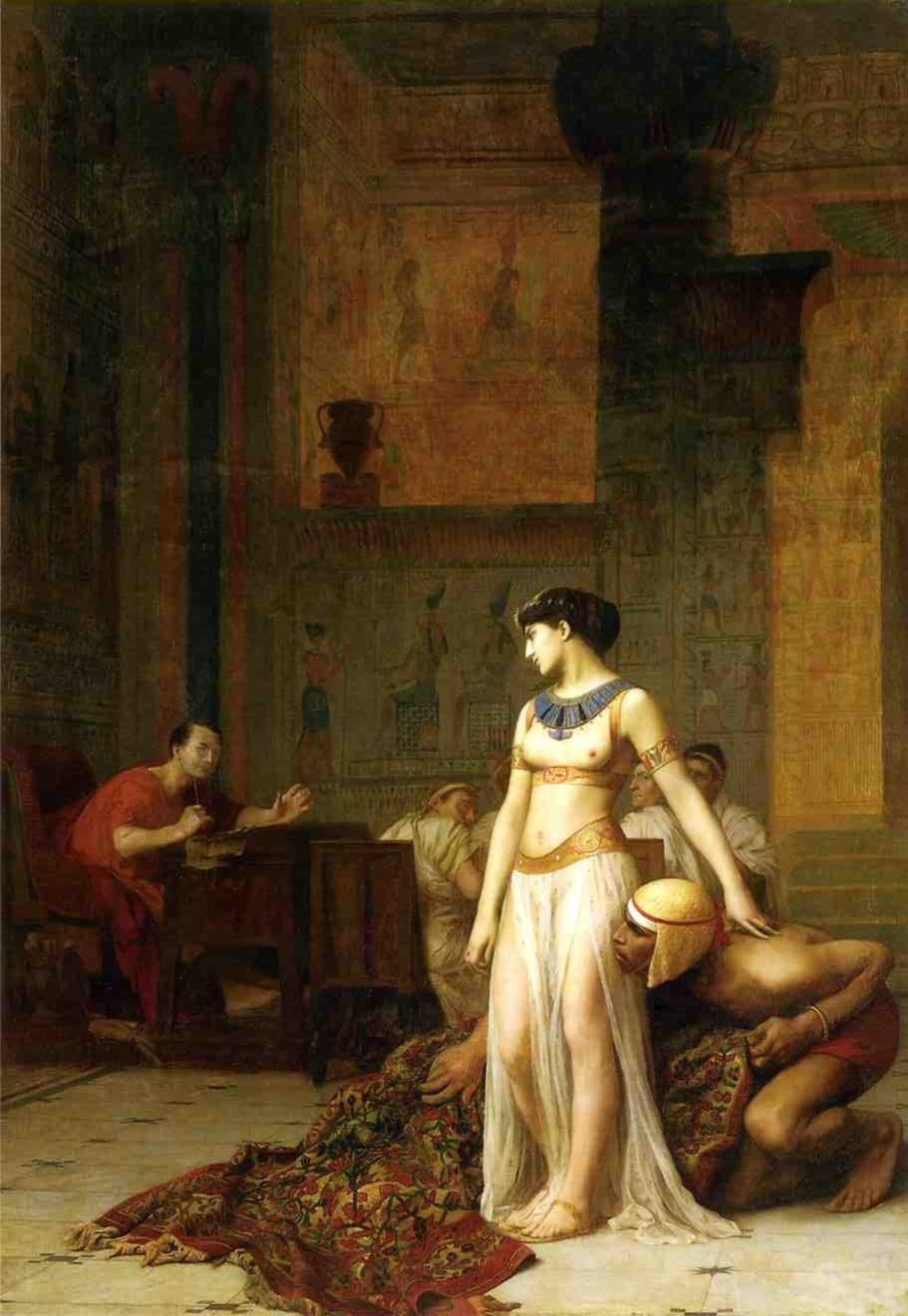
Cleopatra and Caesar by Jean-Léon Gérôme, 1866. Apollodorus is depicted in the bottom right.

Apparently Ptolemy XIII tried to block his sister's access to Alexandria. Plutarch gives an account of her adventurous journey to the Egyptian capital. According to this report she chose from her retinue only one follower, Apollodorus the Sicilian, and travelled with him to Alexandria. The Roman poet Lucan claims, that when Cleopatra arrived near the city she bribed a guardian to remove the defensive chains in the harbour of Pharus. In any case she entered the harbour of Alexandria by sea, because both Plutarch and Lucan say that she landed unobserved with her barque near the royal palace. According to Plutarch this happened in the twilight, and the Greek biographer adds that Cleopatra thought that her only chance to get to Caesar was to stretch herself at full length inside a bed-sack or carpet while Apollodorus tied it up with a cord and carried it past the guardians into the palace. The Egyptian Queen allegedly succeeded in that way in reaching the Roman general and in winning him over with this bold action. The credibility of this episode is disputed among scholars. But it is certain that Cleopatra gained Caesar's support by her appearance in person.

So Cleopatra, taking only Apollodorus from among her friends, embarked in a little skiff and landed at the palace when it was already getting dark; and as it was impossible to escape notice otherwise, she stretched herself at full length inside a bed-sack, while Apollodorus tied the bed-sack up with a cord and carried it indoors to Caesar.

Nothing else is known about Apollodorus.

== In media ==
- Apollodorus is mentioned briefly in act 2, scene 6 of William Shakespeare's Anthony and Cleopatra. The pirate Sextus Pompey goads Mark Anthony about his lover Cleopatra once being married to Julius Caesar, his friend. Pompey tells Anthony "I have heard Apollodorus carried-", before he is interrupted by Ahenobarbus, who later admits that Apollodorus did indeed carry "a certain queen to Caesar in a mattress."
- The role of Apollodorus is played by Cesare Danova in the 1963 epic, Cleopatra and is depicted as being somewhat in love with Cleopatra. Just prior to her suicide he tells her "I have always loved you." and she replies "And I have always known."
- In the 1945 film Caesar and Cleopatra, based on the play by George Bernard Shaw, he is played by Stewart Granger, and is depicted as being somewhat in love with Cleopatra.
- He was played in the first television adaptation of the play by Farley Granger, and in the second TV adaptation by Clive Francis.
- In the 2017 video game, Assassin's Creed Origins, Apollodorus is portrayed by actor Gerald Kyd, and is instrumental in managing a network of pro-Cleopatra spies and informants spread across Egypt. He is portrayed as an ally of the protagonist, Bayek
- In the 2003 book The October Horse by Colleen McCullough, Apollodorus plays a prominent role as a close, trusted servant of Cleopatra.
