= Gilberto Govi =

Italian actor and screenwriter

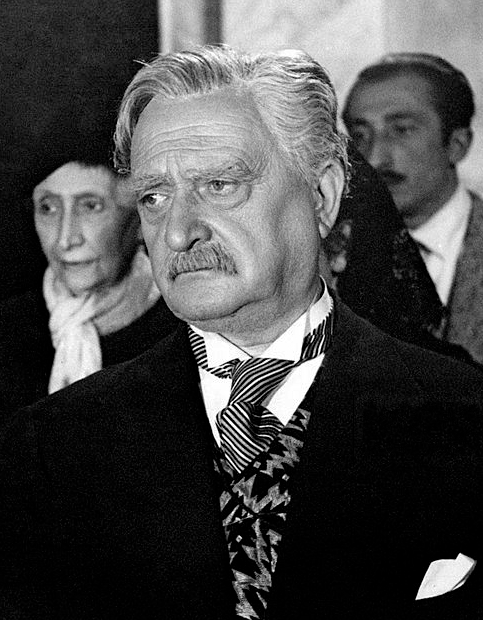
- Gilberto Govi in the film Che tempi! (1948)
- Born: 22 October 1885; Genoa, Italy
- Died: 28 April 1966 (aged 80); Genoa, Italy
- Occupations: Film and stage actor, screenwriter
- Years active: 1942–1960

Amerigo Armando Gilberto Govi (Italian pronunciation: [dʒilˈbɛrto ˈɡɔːvi]; 22 October 1885 – 28 April 1966) was an Italian film and stage actor and screenwriter. He was the founder of the Genoese Dialectal Theatre.

Among his greatest successes were I manezzi pe majâ na figgia (I maneggi per maritare una figlia, "How to marry off one's daughter"), Pignasecca e Pignaverde ("Dry Pinecone and Green Pinecone") and Colpi di Timone ("Rudder blows"). Also famous in Italy, especially Genoa and Liguria, are Quello bonanima ("The one who had a good soul"), Gildo Peragallo, ingegnere ("Gildo Peragallo, engineer"), I Gustavino e i Passalacqua ("The Gustavinos and the Passalacquas") and Sotto a chi tocca ("Who's next?").

== Sources ==
- Ternavasio, Maurizio (2001). Gilberto Govi. Vita d'attore [Gilberto Govi. Life of an actor] (in Italian). Turin: Lindau.
- Gilberto Govi at IMDb
