= Jolanda, the Daughter of the Black Corsair =

1953 film

Jolanda la figlia del corsaro nero
- Directed by: Mario Soldati
- Written by: Ennio De Concini; Ivo Perilli
- Produced by: Dino De Laurentiis; Carlo Ponti
- Cinematography: Tonino Delli Colli
- Edited by: Leo Catozzo
- Music by: Nino Rota
- Release date: 5 February 1953
- Country: Italy
- Language: Italian

Jolanda, the Daughter of the Black Corsair, also known as Yolanda (Italian: Jolanda, la figlia del corsaro nero) is a 1953 Italian film directed by Mario Soldati, and based on the novel Yolanda, the Black Corsair's Daughter by Emilio Salgari.

== Plot ==
Collected at the age of two, in extreme conditions, by a company of gypsies, Jolly grew up among them, together with the man who accompanied her and who subsequently educated her in the military arts, making her, in appearance and in bearing, very similar to a young man. One day, near Maracaibo, the two intervene to help the escort of Consuelo, daughter of the Count of Medina, attacked by a group of brigands. Gravely wounded, on the verge of death, the guardian tells Jolly about her origins. Her real name is Jolanda, daughter of the Count of Ventimiglia, the legendary Black Corsair, treacherously murdered by Van Guld, Count of Medina, who then entrusted the child to him to kill her. He also tells her about the existence of a family treasure.

To avenge the death of her father, Jolanda, in the company of the black corsair's faithful companions, Van Stiller and Agonia, allies herself, in Tortuga, with the pirate Morgan, who, under the English banner, is fighting Spain. But the war is coming to an end. At the time of the signing of the armistice, the treacherous Van Guld, with a ruse, manages to obtain from the English representative the consent to the arrest and trial of the pirates present in Maracaibo, including Morgan's son, Ralf, who has become in the meantime. Jolanda's lover.

She, not having agreed to lay down her arms, instead escaped capture. Introduced into the palace of the Medina, she manages to reach Consuelo of her who, deceived by her masculine appearance, she was madly in love with her since their first meeting, six months before her. Thus, it is not difficult for Jolanda to kidnap the little countess and use her as a means of exchange for the release of Ralf and the arrested pirates. But Van Guld sets yet another trap and, on the exchange site, sets up an ambush. The young woman, captured and tortured, does not reveal the location of the treasure. Meanwhile, Ralf and his men are besieged by the Spanish armigers in the female convent of Santa Esperancia, where a hospital for lepers is located.

A sortie allows Van Stiller to join Henry Morgan who, due to the special merits obtained in the English crown, had escaped arrest and had been placed under surveillance on his ship. Informed of the course of events, the pirate resolves to intervene. The situation is reversed and, while in a last attempt to escape the Count of Medina finds himself adrift in a boat full of lepers, Yolanda and her family take possession of the treasure.

== Cast ==
- May Britt: Yolanda
- Marc Lawrence: Van Gould
- Renato Salvatori: Ralf, son Morgan
- Barbara Florian: Consuelo di Medina
- Guido Celano: Morgan, the pirate
- Ignazio Balsamo: Van Stiller
- Alberto Sorrentino: Agonia
- Umberto Spadaro: Yolanda's stepfather
- Domenico Serra: Ramon

== See also ==
- Henry Morgan's raid on Lake Maracaibo
