= The Son of Sandokan =

- Genre: Historical adventure
- Directed by: Sergio Sollima
- Starring: Kabir Bedi
- Country of origin: Italy
- Original language: Italian
- No. of series: 1
- No. of episodes: 2

Production
- Production company: Hiland Productions

Original release
- Network: Rai 1

Related
- The Return of Sandokan

The Son of Sandokan (Italian: Il figlio di Sandokan) is a 1998 Italian adventure television miniseries. It is a sequel to the 1996 series The Return of Sandokan, which itself followed on from the original 1976 series Sandokan. All were based on the series of Sandokan novels by Emilio Salgari about a Malaysian pirate fighting against the British in the nineteenth century.

Kabir Bedi reprised his role of Sandokan from the earlier series with Marco Bonini playing his son. The cast also included Padma Lakshmi, Marián Aguilera, François Guétary, Joss Ackland, Daniel Olbrychski, Alberto Dell'Acqua and Barbara Livi. It was directed by Sergio Sollima. Filming in Sri Lanka began on 22 August 1998, and was set to last three months.

The episodes have never been aired in Italy or released on DVD because of heavy legal issues.

== Plot ==
Ken Hastings, born to Sandokan and a noble English woman, lives in India. Unaware of the whereabouts of his father, he starts a journey to Malaysia with the help of his servant Serikai and Shanti, who he falls in love with.

== Bibliography ==
- Thomas Riggs. Contemporary Theatre, Film and Television. Cengage Gale, 2007.
