= The Return of Sandokan =

Television series

- Written by: Adriano Bolzoni; George Eastman
- Directed by: Enzo G. Castellari
- Starring: Kabir Bedi; Mandala Tayde
- Composer: Guido and Maurizio De Angelis
- Countries of origin: Germany; Italy

Original release
- Network: Canale 5

Related
- Sandokan; The Son of Sandokan

The Return of Sandokan is a 1996 television series produced by Germany (where it was released as Die Rückkehr des Sandokan) and Italy (where is known as Il ritorno di Sandokan). It is a sequel to the 1976 Sandokan television series starring Kabir Bedi. Bedi had also appeared in a 1977 spin-off film La tigre è ancora viva: Sandokan alla riscossa!.

It was followed in 1998 by another sequel The Son of Sandokan, featuring Sandokan and his son.

== Cast ==
- Kabir Bedi as Sandokan
- Mandala Tayde as Lady Dora Parker
- Fabio Testi as Yanez De Gomera
- Romina Power as Maharani Surama
- Tobias Hoesl as James Guilford
- Randi Ingerman as Yamira
- Mathieu Carrière as Raska
- Vittoria Belvedere as Baba
- Lorenzo Crespi as André De Gomera
- Friedrich von Thun as Lord Parker
- Clive Riche as Alfred Higgins
- Franco Nero as Yogi Azim
- Jackie Basehart as Sir Burton
- Denzil Smith as Village Headman

== Reception ==
The Return of Sandokan received negative criticism from television critics.

== See also ==
- Sandokan (1976 TV series)
