= Sandokan (2025 TV series) =

2025 television series based on the novels of Emilio Salgari

- Promotional poster
- Genre: Action; adventure; period drama
- Based on: the Sandokan series of novels by Emilio Salgari
- Developed by: Alessandro Sermoneta; Davide Lentieri; Scott Rosenbaum
- Directed by: Jan Maria Michelini; Nicola Abbatangelo
- Starring: Can Yaman; Alanah Bloor; Ed Westwick; Alessandro Preziosi; John Hannah
- Theme music composer: Guido & Maurizio De Angelis; Calibro 35
- Composer: Calibro 35
- Countries of origin: Italy; France
- Original language: English
- No. of seasons: 1
- No. of episodes: 8

Production
- Executive producers: Jan Maria Michelini; Daniele Passani; Corrado Trionfera
- Producers: Matilde Bernabei; Luca Bernabei; Michele Zatta; Andrea Ozza; Andreana Saint Amour Di Chanaz
- Cinematography: Valerio Evangelista; Alessandro Pesci; Mirco Sgarzi
- Editors: Alessio Doglione; Melodie Caudal
- Running time: 51–61 minutes
- Production companies: Lux Vide; Rai Fiction

Original release
- Network: Rai 1
- Release: 1 December – 16 December 2025

Related
- Sandokan (1976)

Sandokan, also known as Sandokan: The Pirate Prince, is a 2025 Italian adventure television series developed by Alessandro Sermoneta, Davide Lentieri and Scott Rosenbaum, based upon the novels of Emilio Salgari, featuring the pirate prince Sandokan. The previous 1976 television adaptation became a classic in Italy. The first season aired on Rai 1 between 1 and 16 December 2025, and is also available for streaming on several streaming services around the world.

== Plot ==
Borneo, 1841. Amid the British colonial rule of the region, Sandokan is a pirate who sails the South China Sea together with his faithful friend Yanez de Gomera and the rest of his international crew. While boarding a cargo ship belonging to the Sultan of Brunei, Sandokan frees a mysterious prisoner, who believes him to be the prophesied warrior who will free his people from foreign oppression. On the island of Labuan, home of the British consulate, he meets the daughter of the consul, Marianne Guillonk, known as the "Pearl of Labuan" for her beauty and indomitable nature whereby she rejects all of her rich suitors. Their encounter awakens in her a sense of adventure that she is unable to express within the strict Victorian societal norms and brings her closer to Sandokan, with whom she shares an endless struggle for freedom.

However, between the two comes Lord James Brooke, a charming pirate hunter and adventurer at the helm of the Royalist frigate, who is ready to do anything to capture Sandokan and win Marianne's heart. At the heart of the Bornean jungle, everyone will finally face a choice: Marianne will have to overcome her doubts and insecurities and choose between Brooke and Sandokan; Brooke's ambitions will clash with his vulnerabilities; and Sandokan, a simple pirate living day by day, will discover his true identity and become the "Tiger of Malaysia".

== Cast and characters ==
=== Main cast ===
- Can Yaman as Sandokan
- Alanah Bloor as Lady Marianne Guillonk
- Alessandro Preziosi as Yanez de Gomera
- Ed Westwick as Lord James Brooke
- Madeleine Price as Sani
- Owen Teale as Lord Guillonk
- John Hannah as Sergeant Murray
- Matt McCooey as Sultan Muda Hashim of Brunei
- Gilberto Gliozzi as Sambigliong
- Samuele Segreto as Emilio

=== Supporting cast ===
- Mark Grosy as Sarkar
- Lucy Gaskell as Lady Frances Guillonk
- Sergej Onopko as Yussuf
- Thomas Chaanhing as Lamai
- Angeliqa Devi as Hita
- Jun Lancini as the Vizier of Brunei
- Anja Bourdais as Nur
- Alioune Badiane as Sea Spider
- Gabriele Bucci as Child Sandokan
- Freddy Drabble as Doctor
- Samuel Kay as Sir Williams
- Alexandra Masangkay as Olla
- Sebastiano Kiniger as Young Lord Guillonk
- Micky Ray Martin as Chief Prison Guard
- Thomas Hunt as Prison Guard
- Mila Robinson as Child Marianne Guillonk
- Mattia Sonnino as Held
- Tanya Saxena as Suhasini
- Mauro Aversano as Boxer
- Alex Marchi as British Navy Officer
- Zheng Xi Yong as Afan, Sani's Brother
- Nadia Rahman as Kilima, Sani's Cousin
- Steve Chusak as Makota, Sandokan's Father
- Simon Rizzoni as Bajau, Kilima's Husband
- Jules Chan as Timul
- Haruhiko Yamanouchi as Tuwak Balau, Lamai's Father and Dayak Chief
- Marcus Hodson as Lang, Lamai's Brother
- Jamie Hayden as Haji
- Yoon C. Joyce as Pidgin
- Tim Daish
- Raja Sethi
- Amy Boda
- Benjamin Vasquez Barcellano Jr.
- Noli Sta Isabel
- Yothin Clavenzani

== Episodes ==
No.	Title	Directed by	Written by	Length	Original release date	Italy viewers (millions)	Ref.
1	"The Tiger of Malaysia" (Italian: La Tigre della Malesia)	Jan Maria Michelini	Alessandro Sermoneta	58 min	1 December 2025	6.233	
Sandokan and his pirate crew board a ship and free Dayak prisoner Lamai, who is persuaded that his liberator is the destined warrior foretold in an ancient prophecy. After landing in Labuan, where he hides behind the false identity of "Ismail", Sandokan finds himself clashing with pirate hunter James Brooke during a tiger hunt, and meets Marianne Guillonk, the daughter of the widowered English consul.
2	"The Pearl of Labuan" (Italian: La Perla di Labuan)	Jan Maria Michelini	Alessandro Sermoneta, Claudio F. Benedetti	51 min	1 December 2025	5.211	
The Guillonks host a ball to celebrate Marianne's 21st birthday. Both Brooke and Sandokan are invited, and tension arises during the party, fuelled by the arrival of the Sultan of Brunei. Marianne's servant, Sani, is from the subjugated Dayak people and confronts Sandokan over the prophecy. However, he is in Labuan to free his friend Yanez and the rest of the crew, who have been imprisoned by the British. Whilst liberating them, Sandokan is forced to kidnap Marianne and Sani, who were wandering near the dungeons.
3	"Hostage" (Italian: In ostaggio)	Jan Maria Michelini	Federico Gnesini, Valentina Strada	59 min	8 December 2025	4.615	
The pirates set sail with the goal of looting the Sultan's antimony mines, where the enslaved Dayak labour, but Brooke and Sergeant Murray chase him in order to rescue Marianne. As the young lady begins to grasp the extent of the atrocities committed by the British colonial forces, Sani manages to have a brief encounter with her enslaved brother Afan, from whom she had been forcefully separated in her childhood.
4	"Singapore"	Nicola Abbatangelo	Federico Gnesini, Valentina Strada	57 min	8 December 2025	4.227	
The crew find refuge in Sandokan's native country of Singapore, where his tuberculosis-ridden mother Nur still lives. Even though Brooke and Murray are after him, Lord Guillonk agrees to pay the pirates a ransom in exchange for his daughter's freedom. During the celebrations for the Lunar New Year, Marianne warms her feelings towards Sandokan, whose background story she has learned. However, when she is about to be entrusted to Brooke, the Sultan's men carry out an ambush and the pirates rush to escape, taking the ransom and hostages with them; Nur reveals she is not Sandokan's biological mother, shortly before dying from the wounds sustained in the ambush.
5	"The Heart of the Jungle" (Italian: Il cuore della giungla)	Nicola Abbatangelo	Giacomo Bisanti	55 min	15 December 2025	4.602	
Brooke starts working to thwart the Sultan's plan, which is to conquer Lord Guillonk's trust and take Brooke's place as his successor. Meanwhile, Sandokan heads to find his real roots in a Dayak village in Sarawak. There, he is captured alongside Marianne and the crew by Lamai and Sani's tribe, who make him duel with a snake to prove he is the Dayak liberator from the prophecy, as Sani claims. As he fights the effects of the snake's venom, he has flashbacks from his childhood and remembers his parents and his real name.
6	"In the Dark" (Italian: Nel buio)	Jan Maria Michelini	Giacomo Bisanti, Alessandro Sermoneta	59 min	15 December 2025	3.972	
Sandokan survives, even though he temporarily loses his sight, and is welcomed by the tribe. The following day, the Sultan's soldiers force some of Sani's relatives to lead them to the Dayak village, with Brooke and Murray stalking them, disobeying Guillonk's order to abort the rescue mission. As his crew is set to depart for Jakarta, Sandokan, now in love with Marianne and at peace with his identity, decides to stay in Sarawak to free his people, but finds out Lord Guillonk is the killer of his family. Having reached the village, Brooke and his men rescue Marianne and take Sandokan as a prisoner.
7	"Death of a Pirate" (Italian: Morte di un pirata)	Jan Maria Michelini	Alessandro Sermoneta, Claudio F. Benedetti	61 min	16 December 2025	4.235	
Sandokan is captured and taken to the Sultan's palace. Marianne, now back in Labuan, confronts her father over his killings and the Sultan's oppressive rule on the Dayak. She is filled with doubts about Brooke's good faith and Sandokan's destiny; diagnosed with hysteria, she is further shocked to find out the truth about her mother's death. Meanwhile, Brooke's Hindu maid Hita is outed as his mother, resulting in Marianne's family rejecting him.
8	"The Cost of Victory" (Italian: Il prezzo della riscossa)	Jan Maria Michelini	Alessandro Sermoneta	59 min	16 December 2025	3.991	
Seeking to take revenge against the Sultan and the Consul, Brooke helps Marianne stage Sandokan's suicide by poisoning so he can escape his death sentence; however, he requests in exchange that she give up her love for him. Once back among the Dayak, Sandokan leads them in battle against the Sultan's forces. The crew find themselves at crossroads in their lives, too, with Yanez making peace with his past and returning to assist Sandokan. Brooke takes advantage of the Dayak rebellion to urge Guillonk to nominate him Rajah of Sarawak in place of the Sultan and suppress the revolt, but finds the opposition of Sergeant Murray. Marianne's aunt, regretting her past mistakes, helps her niece flee her arranged marriage to join Sandokan.

== Production ==
=== Development and casting ===
Production company Lux Vide announced the series on 26 May 2022 and selected Can Yaman to play the titular character and Luca Argentero as Yanez. The miniseries was the idea of Lux Vide CEO Luca Bernabei, and its distribution arrangement outside of Italy is held with Fremantle, its parent company. In Spain, Mediaset España holds the rights instead.

On 18 April 2024, Variety reported that several big name actors (Ed Westwick, John Hannah, Alanah Bloor) had joined Can Yaman as part of the pool of actors in the new miniseries. Argentero was replaced by Alessandro Preziosi in the role of Yanez. Auditions for the role of Emilio, a minor character, were first mooted in 2023, when Lux Vide agents phoned Samuele Segreto when was studying in New York for a year, which he won as a consolation prize on Amici di Maria De Filippi.

Yaman moved to Italy with the goal of taking part in Sandokan and claims that he had never watched the original series, as Salgari's works are not well-known in Turkey and never met Kabir Bedi, who played the titular character in the original series. Upon arrival, he studied the character and took five years to prepare for the role, learning how to ride horses, lose weight, reading source work and improving his English and Italian skills. He did not see Kabir Bedi in person until the first night of the 2026 Sanremo Festival, where Yaman was a co-host in its first night.

Following the successful broadcast of the first two episodes on 1 December 2025, it was announced that a second season was set to be produced and released by 2027, featuring the same main cast plus additional characters, and would be filmed starting in May 2026. In its development stage (before filming) in early 2026, the producers are trying to find a filming location for Mompracem, and there is the possibility of Kabir Bedi making a cameo. As of February 2026, it is not likely that the preliminary work will begin in the summer, likely because the producers needed other types of budget.

=== Filming ===
Filming started on 22 April 2024 in Formello, near Rome, where Lux Vide opened its new studio complex. The series was also shot in other locations in Lazio, Tuscany and Calabria; the latter region was where Labuan was recreated, using funds from the Calabria Film Commission. Filming in Calabria started on 27 May, following the building of an industrial backlot in the city of Lamezia Terme. Local shooting started in Le Castella, Capo Rizzuto, Crotone. By early September, the cast and crew was already on location in Réunion. Filming there took place from 27 August to 13 September, with local executive production provided by Tiktak Production.

The Formello studios, where the initial scenes were shot, had three ships built on purpose for the series, including a 360-degree LED infrastructure to simulate oceans or weather conditions such as storms. Several cave scenes were shot at underground Roman cisterns in Albano Laziale. Most of the jungle scenes were recreated in Parco Laghi dei Reali and Chia Falls. It was also used for most of the indoor locations, such as the consulate of Labuan, the prisons and Singapore. In Tuscany, Sammezzano was used as the palace of the Sultan of Brunei. The Lamezia Terme backlot was used for most scenes set in Labuan. A panoramic pier was built in Le Castella, while action and persecution scenes were shot in Tropea and Capo Vaticano. Some elements of the sets were mixed with the natural environment of Vibo Marina and Gizzeria. Overseas, some scenes were shot on location in the French overseas department of Réunion; Thailand was used mostly to produce visual elements. Using LED panels, elements of the ocean and sunsets around Thailand were later dispatched to the Italian studios.

The Calabria Film Commission injected €800,000 into its production, but there are fewer scenes compared to those shot in Sammezzano and in Lazio, according to Domani, a local newspaper. This was seen with criticism from locals, even though the original plans were to "show Calabria to the world".

In the summer of 2025, it was anticipated that in the event of a second season the series would be filmed again in Calabria.

=== Previews ===
A preview was shown on 28 February 2025 during Fremantle Presents, Fremantle's upfront event at the London TV Screenings.

On 24 June 2025, the series was presented at the Italian Global Series Festival in Riccione.

=== Soundtrack ===
The musical score for the series was assigned to and performed by Italian band Calibro 35. For the opening theme, the group chose to cover the popular theme from the 1976 series, composed by Guido and Maurizio De Angelis (aka Oliver Onions), which remained widely associated with Sandokan among Italians.

== Release ==
The eight episodes of the series aired in Italy on Rai 1 and RaiPlay over three weeks from 1 December 2025. Following the original run, the series was streamed on the Italian version of Disney+.

In Portugal, the series aired on AXN in December. It was previewed locally at Tribeca Festival Lisbon in October, where Ed Westwick was present.

One of the first streaming rights holders was Central European Media Enterprises, which made it available on the Voyo service in Slovenia, Croatia and Serbia. At the 2025 Asian Television Forum, Fremantle sold the series to Hits Now in Southeast Asia, Star Entertainment in India and LG U+ in Korea.

On 19 January 2026, the series joined Netflix in the United Kingdom and the Americas, rapidly ascending to the top tens in several countries in the week it was added.

== Reception ==
Reception of the series in Italy has been mixed. The Italian edition of Vanity Fair did an overall positive review, but criticized the first twenty minutes of the first episode for its excessive action scenes, showing a problem of the media landscape in 2025, but later gained impulse as the characters were being presented one by one. It also called for Rai 1 to increase the amount of original action series, owing to the 34% share of the first two episodes, calling the series "a breath of fresh air" in a channel whose main fiction titles are mostly criminal series. Cinema Serie TV called it "a complex test", which does not replace the 1976 series, but rather tries establishing dialogue with it, by having more creative freedom instead of being a mere recreation. Can Yaman's performance was touted as being a thing in its own right instead of replicating the original.

The series received multi-million viewership figures, with an average of four million tuning in. This has been attributed to either a "nostalgia effect" of the 1976 series or the presence of Can Yaman.

== See also ==
- List of Italian television series
