= Mandala Tayde =

German actress and model (born 1975)

Mandala Tayde (born 27 April 1975) is a German actress and model who works in Italy and Germany.

== Career ==
Tayde was born and raised in Frankfurt by German-Indian parents. She started a modeling career at 13, with a campaign for beauty products. After intensive drama education at the Central School of Speech and Drama in London, she moved to Italy in 1997, where she played in the movie Fireworks which earned 36 million euros. She also acted in the praised Indian film, Dil Chahta Hai.

Tayde became famous in Germany for her lead role of Aylin in the TV film Kiss me Kismet, where she acted with Florian David Fitz. This role earned her an Adolf Grimme Award in 2007. At the end of the 1990s she returned to German television in the lead role of the Arabian princess Amina in the TV story in three parts Desert of Fire, a French-Italian-German coproduction. In addition, she played alongside Kabir Bedi in The Return of Sandokan.

== Selected filmography ==
- 1996: The Return of Sandokan
- 1997: Desert of Fire
- 1997: Fireworks
- 1998: Tristan und Isolde - Eine Liebe für die Ewigkeit (TV Part 1/2)
- 1999: Amore a prima vista
- 2000: Tödliche Wildnis – Sie waren jung und mussten sterben (TV film)
- 2000: Liebe pur (TV film)
- 2001: Santa Maradona
- 2001: Dil Chahta Hai
- 2001: Days of Grace
- 2006: Kiss me Kismet (TV film)
- 2006: Vater auf der Flucht (TV film)
- 2006: Hate 2 O
- 2008: Tatort – Familienaufstellung
- 2008: Inspector Montalbano La Pista di Sabbia, horse owner Rachele Esterman
- 2009: Wilsberg – Oh du tödliche…
- Guest-starring in a few television series, such as Leipzig Homicide

== Other appearances (magazines/interviews) ==
- 1998: PlayBoy German Dezember 1998 edition (magazine)

== Personal life ==
She has a son named Leon.
