= Dario D'Ambrosi =

Italian actor and filmmaker

Dario D'Ambrosi (born April 15, 1958 in San Giuliano Milanese) is an Italian actor and filmmaker.

== Biography ==
D'Ambrosi was born in San Giuliano Milanese in Lombardy, Italy.

While still living in Italy, he became interested in theater and in mental illness. He interned for three months at the Paolo Pini psychiatric hospital in Milan, where he was able to study the patient's behaviors. This experience began to inspire his idea of pathological theatre, or Teatro Patologico.

He then moved to New York City and met Ellen Stewart, founder of La MaMa Experimental Theatre Club in the East Village of Manhattan. She encouraged him to perform a monologue titled Tutti non ci sono at the theatre in 1980.

D'Ambrosi was involved in other productions at La MaMa throughout the 1980s. After the February production of Tutti non ci sono, D'Ambrosi's play Statues of Wax ("Statue di Cera" or "Estatuas de Cera") was performed by Il Gruppo Dada Internazionale in May 1980. In 1981, Ozzie Rodriguez directed a production of D'Ambrosi's Days of Antonio. He performed in Tutti non ci sono again at La MaMa in 1983. He then performed La Trota, which dealt with themes of mental illness, in 1986. He performed in his play Enemy of Mine with Stefano Abbati in 1988. In 1989, he performed Tutti non ci sono in English (as "All Are Not Here") and in Italian. Decades later, in 2004, D'Ambrosi performed Nemico Mio at La MaMa.

He also directed Italian theatre festivals at La MaMa in the late 1980s, and again in 1995. The "L'Altra Italia" festival in 1988 featured work and performances by Mario Prosperi, Paolo Frassanito, Antonello Neri, Ro' Rocchi, Nicola Pistoia, and Lorenzo Alessandri. The 1989 festival featured work and performances by Diviana Ingravallo, Marcello Sambati, and Marcello Bartoli, in addition to D'Ambrosi. In 1995, "L'Altra Italia III" featured work and performances by Paolo Porto, Carla Cassola, Max Scaglione, and Marina Suma.

D'Ambrosi continued acting and also started working as a director. He directed his first film, Il Ronzio delle Mosche ("The Buzzing of Flies"), in 2003.

Between 2008 and 2010, he starred in the television series Romanzo criminale ("Crime Novel - the Series") in the role of assistant commissioner Scialoja. His character was investigating the Banda della Magliana. In 2004, he appeared in Mel Gibson's The Passion of the Christ.

== Partial filmography ==
=== As actor ===
==== Film ====
- 1987: Personaggi e interpreti (directed by Heinz Bütler) - Antonio
- 1988: Odipussi (directed by Vicco von Bulow) - Mafioso
- 1993: Cafe La Mama (directed by Gianluca Fumagalli)
- 1993: Give Them My Regards - Avanzi di Galera (directed by Gianna Maria Garbelli) - Roberto Albani
- 1999: Libero Burro (directed by Sergio Castellitto) - Inspector
- 1999: Titus (directed by Julie Taymor) - Clown
- 2000: Two Like Us, Not the Best (directed by Stefano Grossi) - Uomo al telefono
- 2000: Nella terra di nessuno (directed by Gianfranco Giagni)
- 2000: Almost Blue (directed by Alex Infascelli) - Matera
- 2001: In the No Man's Land (directed by Gianfranco Giagni)
- 2002: Nati Tired (directed by Dominick Tambasco)
- 2004: The Passion of the Christ (directed by Mel Gibson) - Roman Soldier #3
- 2004: Ballet of War (directed by Mario Rellini) - Anton
- 2011: L'uomo Gallo ("The Rooster Man") (directed by D'Ambrosi)
- 2016: Zio Gaetano è morto (directed by Antonio Manzini)
- 2019: Jeanne (directed by Mariano Aprea) - Himself

==== Television ====
- 1997: Racket (television miniseries, directed by Luigi Perelli)
- 1997: Don Milani the Prior of Barbiana (TV Movie, directed by Andrea Frazzi and Antoni Frazzi) - Benito
- 2000: Padre Pio: Between Heaven and Earth (directed by Giulio Base) - Angelo Lupi
- 2001: Uno Bianca (TV Movie, directed by Michele Soavi) - Commissario Emilio Valli
- 2001: I Will Be Your Judge (TV Movie, directed by Gianluigi Calderone)
- 2001: The Witness (TV Movie, directed by Michele Soavi)
- 2003: Ferrari (TV Movie, directed by Carlo Carlei)
- 2004: Don Bosco (directed by Lodovico Gasparini)
- 2006: Attack to the State (TV Movie, directed by Michele Soavi)
- 2009: Miacarabefana.it (TV Movie, directed by Lodovico Gasparini)
- 2008-2010: Romanzo criminale ("Crime Novel - the Series") (directed by Stefano Sollima)

=== As director ===
- 2003: Il Ronzio delle Mosche ("The Buzzing of Flies")
- 2010: L'uomo Gallo ("The Rooster Man")
