= Almost Blue (film) =

2000 film by Alex Infascelli

- Directed by: Alex Infascelli
- Written by: Sergio Donati; Alex Infascelli; Luca Infascelli
- Based on: novel by Carlo Lucarelli
- Produced by: Vittorio Cecchi Gori
- Cinematography: Arnaldo Catinari
- Music by: Massimo Volume
- Release date: 2000
- Running time: 86 minutes
- Country: Italy
- Language: Italian

Almost Blue is a 2000 Italian thriller film directed by Alex Infascelli.

== Cast ==
- Lorenza Indovina as Grazia Negro
- Andrea Di Stefano as Vittorio Poletto
- Claudio Santamaria as Simone Martini
- Dario D'Ambrosi as Matera
- Rolando Ravello as Alessio Crotti
- Regina Orioli as Lorenza
- Benedetta Buccellato as mother of Simone
- Luciano Curreli as Raul Crotti
- Angelica di Maio as Vera
- Marco Giallini as Sarrina
- Alex Infascelli as Luther Blissett
- Marisa Solinas as widow Lazzaroni
