= Sandokan (1976 TV series) =

1976 television series based on the novels of Emilio Salgari

- Promotional poster for the second episode
- Genre: Adventure; drama
- Based on: the Sandokan character from the novels The Tigers of Mompracem and The Pirates of Malaysia by Emilio Salgari
- Screenplay by: Sergio Sollima; Alberto Silvestri; Antonio Lucatelli; Giuseppe Mangione; Manlio Scarpelli
- Directed by: Sergio Sollima
- Starring: Kabir Bedi; Carole André; Philippe Leroy; Adolfo Celi
- Composer: Guido and Maurizio De Angelis
- Countries of origin: Italy; France; West Germany
- Original language: Italian
- No. of seasons: 1
- No. of episodes: 6

Production
- Producer: Elio Scardamaglia
- Cinematography: Marcello Masciocchi
- Editor: Alberto Gallitti
- Running time: 60 minutes
- Production companies: RAI; ORTF (Note: ORTF was dissolved during production); Bavaria Film; Titanus

Original release
- Network: Rete 1
- Release: 6 January – 8 February 1976

Related
- La tigre è ancora viva: Sandokan alla riscossa! (1977); The Return of Sandokan (1996); The Son of Sandokan (1998); Sandokan (2025)

Sandokan is a 1976 Italian television series directed by Sergio Sollima, based upon the novels of Emilio Salgari featuring the pirate hero Sandokan. It was followed in 1977 by a feature-length spin-off film, and in 1996 by a sequel series named The Return of Sandokan, with Kabir Bedi reprising his role as Sandokan in both. The series was a RAI co-production with German and French companies Bavaria Film and ORTF.

Universally recognized as one of the most famous television dramas in the history of Italian television, Sandokan was broadcast by RAI in 6 episodes from 6 January to 8 February 1976 on Rete 1 (now Rai 1), enjoying great success, especially among younger audiences. Together with the dramas The Odyssey (1968), Eneide (1971), and Jesus of Nazareth (1977), Sandokan inaugurated the beginning of forms of co-production with Italian and foreign producers; in this way, in the seventies, a different articulation of fiction began to emerge which tended to go beyond the "scripted from published work" genre to expand towards new frontiers, calling on directors and intellectuals to renew and expand the offer of fiction or other genres of the TV schedule.

The production of the drama was complex and troubled: the production overall took about four years and its completion was mainly due to the work effort of Sollima, whose intention was to create a realistic product; to achieve this goal Sollima dedicated almost all his energy during the production period. The production grandeur and the success with the public make this drama a milestone in the history of television; it was the first case of an Italian teleromanzo or sceneggiato to be made with the care and production grandeur of a colossal film.

== Plot ==
Malaysia, the second half of the 19th century. The British Queen Victoria owns the domain of the eastern lands of Borneo. The occupying British forces are commanded by James Brooke, oppressive and ruthless governor. The brave Sandokan is a young Malaysian prince who has lost his kingdom and title as result of the British annexation. Along with his friend Yanez De Gomera (of Portuguese origin), Sandokan is now the ruler of the isle of Mompracem, a den of pirates who make constant attacks against British forces.

One day Sandokan travels from the island of Malaysia to the lands of Borneo. Lured into a trap, Sandokan is injured in an attack, falls overboard, and is found and treated by the family of Lord Guillonk, uncle of the beautiful Marianna Guillonk, nicknamed "The Pearl of Labuan". In fact, Guillonk does not know Sandokan personally, and mistakes the pirate for an Indian noble. Sandokan plays along with this deception, as Marianna and he have fallen in love with each other. The love between them is not meant to last for long. Brooke continues to pursue Sandokan. This culminates in the invasion of Mompracem, in which Sandokan loses both Marianna and his base, but is able to escape and start his resistance against the English anew.

== Production ==
=== Development and casting ===
Towards the end of the 1960s, Sergio Sollima intended to adapt The Tigers of Mompracem into the form of a single feature film. The director contacted several Asian actors for the role of Sandokan, even the famous Japanese actor Toshiro Mifune, and worked on the script for about a year. Despite this, the project did not take off and was abandoned. In the seventies, Goffredo Lombardo and Elio Scardamaglia, producers of Titanus and RAI respectively, joined forces to create a television drama starring the famous pirate created by Salgari. Their true inspiration was the general director Ettore Bernabei, who had long insisted on the idea of reducing Salgari's novels for the small screen. Damiano Damiani, Duccio Tessari, Suso Cecchi D'Amico and even Sergio Leone were considered for directing, but none of them accepted. Lombardo and Scardamaglia then chose Sollima. The director was busy editing Devil in the Brain (1972) when Tullio Kezich came to him to propose Sandokan. Sollima was enthusiastic, but made one condition: he would direct the drama only on real locations, with Asian actors and with absolute realism.

Being a good connoisseur of Emilio Salgari, literary father of Sandokan and of the novels of the pirates of Malaysia cycle, Sollima had learned that all the author's works, although equipped with an apparently simple narrative line, were very difficult to transpose onto television. For the subject, Sollima decided to base himself above all on The Tigers of Mompracem and The Pirates of Malaya, expanding some subplots (English colonial development, the affirmation of the empire of the white raja James Brooke and the love story between Sandokan and Marianna). and the presence of some secondary characters (Yanez and Brooke). The screenplay was written by Sollima and Alberto Silvestri. Sollima committed himself to the search for actors "who, despite their inevitable realistic dimension, were capable of suggesting something heroic, magical". After having set aside Mifune for the role of Sandokan, Sollima organized a vast and complex research plan to find the protagonist's interpreter. The latter, Kabir Bedi, a young Indian of Sikh religion, who auditioned to play Tremal-Naik, was discovered in Mumbai in 1974.

"They examined me and told me that yes, perhaps I would have been good for the role of the nineteenth-century pirate imagined by Emilio Salgari - Bedi said in an interview - but that for a final decision I would have to present myself, at my own expense, to a casting in Rome. I decided to try my luck and the audition went well, so much so that they immediately paid for my hotel and began to hold me in high regard. Today - he continues - I want to pay a tribute of gratitude to the director Sergio Sollima who allowed my debut and to Rai who had the courage to launch into a production that was very expensive for those times". The actor had a "plump" physique and had to undergo hard training in order to lose weight. Furthermore, he also took swimming lessons (he didn't know how to swim) and horse riding. A problem regarding the cast for Sollima was Tremal-Naik who, for the director, had always been the "least personal character, the most difficult to make act [...], a faded copy of Sandokan himself". It was decided to modify the character, making him "a sort of Mowgli from The Jungle Book a few years older". The role went to the young Ganesh Kumar, a waiter who worked in a hotel in Madras.

The role of Marianna Guillonk, Sandokan's lover, was given to Carole André, which Sollima had already contacts with her years earlier in his film debut, the western Faccia a faccia (1967). According to the director, Carole had the "right cosmopolitan charm", also because she was "the daughter of Gaby André, a French diva and an American Eli Smith who was a kind of gangster". Sollima went against the production which instead did everything to impose an Italian actress. Although initially, Sollima had thought of Helmut Griem for the role of Brooke, but ended up entrusting Adolfo Celi. In particular, Celi and Philippe Leroy were judged perfect by the director, who considered them «two authentic adventurers» (Sollima was evidently referring to Celi's Brazilian past and Leroy's past in the foreign legion, fighting in both Indochina and Algeria). Sal Borgese was set to play Kammamuri, but was fired when the character was omitted from the script. The actor, however, will play the role in La tigre è ancora viva: Sandokan alla riscossa! which was filmed a few years later.

=== Filming locations ===
After two years in the making, principal photography on the film began in July 1974 and lasted eight months. There were no particular complications, apart from some difficulties in finding the sets. Initially, it was expected to shoot in Borneo, the theater of Salgari's stories, but the territory was judged too "uncomfortable". Sollima then moved the troupe to safer and easier territories such as India, western Malaysia and Thailand. According to Sollima: "The palace of James Brooke (Sarawak), which in reality is the Astana of Kuching, quite squalid, was found in Trivandrum (Thiruvananthapuram), the capital of Kerala, in the extreme south of India, that is, the sultan's palace, with a very curious architecture, almost entirely in carved wood, with a very Malaysian atmosphere." The exteriors of the Sarawak peak were recreated by cleverly using some views of the famous Golconda and Bhongir forts. The search for the island on which to set Mompracem therefore cost the director and the technical cast time and effort, in fact Sollima declared that he inspected various islands (that of Keramàn and those of Langkaw) before finding the right one (Kapas, an island that is at times rocky and at times rich in beaches and palm trees which had previously been a real refuge for pirates). The search for Labuan. Sollima said: «Labuan cinematographic was born from an Indo-Malay collage. In Malaysia, in fact, there are very few traces of the period of English colonisation, erased if anything by those of the current "Americanization". The "nature" of Labuan, that is Malay, one hundred percent authentic, but the civilized, "English" part, we had to look for in India: Lord Guillonk's villa, the large park, the bush where the tiger hunt takes place. Then the tigers of course and the elephants and the "mahuts", or elephant drivers and certain scenes in which many "sipahi" were needed, that is, the Indian mercenary soldiers of the East India Company, we found all this in Madras (Chennai), the capital of Tamil Nadu, in southern India". Lord Guillonk's villa was simulated by the Blavatsky bungalow in Madras, named in honor of its former mistress, the famous philosopher and theosophist Madame Blavatsky.

The "aerial" fight between Sandokan and the tiger was filmed by Sollima with the help of the same team that later supervised the special effects of Superman by Richard Donner. One day, in India, the director shot the tiger's leap, on another, in London, the leap of Bedi's stunt double. Then, thanks to the help of special effects, he linked the two sequences to the editing, making them coincide.

== Promotion and distribution ==
=== Broadcast ===
Sandokan was to be delivered to RAI on 31 August 1975 and then broadcast in November of the same year. But due to a long legal dispute with Titanus, the television debut was postponed to the beginning of 1976. Sollima asked Rai to postpone the release of the drama so as to make it debut on color television, but in the end Sandokan was released in black and white, despite having been shot in color, and without great publicity; the first episode, in fact, was broadcast on 6 January 1976 unscheduled in place of Un colpo di fortuna and without the usual announcement on Radiocorriere TV. Yet, from the first episode, Sandokan garnered great public acclaim. The six episodes (broadcast from 6 January to 8 February 1976) were seen by 27 million people, an all-time record for Italian television.

Sandokan became a true "national case" of its own. Many children in those years were called by the name of the protagonist and the term even became an adjective, meaning "strong and/or big and/or brave". It represented "a substantial change in the tastes of a popular public" and activated «one of the main phenomena of merchandising and television fandom", unusual for the time if relating to a television product, reproduced from sticker albums, school diaries, T-shirts, carnival masks, toys and so on. The performance of Kabir Bedi, semi-unknown at the beginning of filming, entered the collective memory and made the actor a figure revered by an entire generation. Bedi himself turned out to be very pleased and in fact he later expressed his attachment to the drama on several occasions: «I have always considered the success of Sandokan as my greatest fortune. Because he is the one who made me what every actor dreams of being: unforgettable". Similar to Bedi, Carole André also became very famous. The television Sandokan, while consecrating her in terms of popularity, soon became an intolerable limit for the actress, who was never able to obtain important parts in other productions and was content with stereotyped and repetitive roles until her retirement from the stage.

=== Italian theatrical release in two parts ===
The public response obtained induced the production to prepare a film version of the drama, divided into two parts, Sandokan - 1st part and Sandokan - 2nd part. Due to the excessive length of the film, which forced one to go to the cinema twice, the film version did not prove to be a great success. Sollima's drama also acquired international resonance: it was in fact exploited in many parts of the world, where it was adequately promoted. Reviewing the first part in April 1976, La Stampa praised its tighter editing and faster pace and noted that colour projection made Vittorio Nino Novarese's costumes, particularly those worn by Kabir Bedi and Carole André, more vivid.

The theatrical version was still being programmed for young audiences in 1978. In Florence, the AB Cinema dei Ragazzi advertised the two parts for consecutive days in March. In Turin, the Erba cinema paired the first part with a Bruno Bozzetto animated short featuring Mr. Rossi in October.

=== Super 8 edition ===
In November 1976, Stampa Sera announced an Italian Super 8 edition of Sandokan for home projection. The colour edition with magnetic sound was prepared by RoPo and comprised four separately available sets of three reels each. The announced price was 75,000 lire per set, or 300,000 lire for all twelve reels. Film scholar Nicole Braida noted that the running time of about four hours indicated that the edition had been abridged from the original six-episode serial.

=== International broadcast ===
In total, Sandokan was sold to eighty-five countries and it was the first time that Americans bought a drama which, although filmed in English, was not of Anglo-Saxon production.

RTP1 aired the series from 19 November to 27 December 1976.

Out of the three countries that produced the series, West Germany saw it much later: ARD only premiered it on 21 April 1979.

In July 1977, Bedi told Stampa Sera that he held the Indian distribution rights to Sandokan and that administrative complications had delayed its release there.

A Hindi-dubbed collectors' edition DVD was released in 2015, the launch was fronted by its lead actor Kabir Bedi. The series had aired before on Doordarshan at some stage in the 1980s, but in English.

== Cast ==
- Kabir Bedi as Sandokan
- Carole André as Lady Marianna Guillonk
- Philippe Leroy as Yanez De Gomera
- Adolfo Celi as James Brooke
- Andrea Giordana as Sir William Fitzgerald
- Hans Caninenberg as Lord Guillonk
- Milla Sannoner as Lucy Mallory
- Renzo Giovampietro as Dr. Kirby
- Franco Fantasia as Captain van Doren

== Soundtrack ==
The musical score for the series was composed and performed by Guido & Maurizio De Angelis under their most famous alias, Oliver Onions. The score, released as an album, also included songs performed by the duo in Italian and English. Their title song, heard under the opening credits, became hugely popular in Italy and Europe.

== In popular culture ==
- In the variety show Due ragazzi incorreggibili (1976-1977), Franco Franchi and Ciccio Ingrassia propose the miniseries Sandogat - Il tigre della Magnesia (Sandogat - The Magnesian Tiger), an evident parody of Sollima's production. Sandogat was, like the original series, divided into six episodes, and was written by Mario Amendola and Bruno Corbucci and starred, other than Franchi (Sandogat) and Ingrassia (Yanez), Daniela Goggi (Marianna), Enzo Andronico, Warner Bentivegna and Enzo Liberti. In the final episode, Sandokan/Kabir Bedi himself appears in a photo montage, voiced by Pino Locchi, followed "impostors" Franco and Ciccio to play the simitar.
- Some references to Sollima's series appeared a few times in the fifth season of the Rai 1 series Un medico in famiglia (2007), owing largely to Kabir Bedi's appearance as Kabir Dahvi, an Indian immigrant who opens an Indian restaurant next to the Martini family's residence. In the episode Affronta la tigre, Kabir sees Cettina for the first time. The woman quickly falls in love with the man, who reminds her of Sandokan, her youthful idol. In the episode Ospite a sorpresa, Carole André appears in the role of Caterina Morelli, an Italian-French actress and opera singer who as a young girl was in love with Kabir and whom she affectionately called by the nickname "tiger" (another reference to the character of Sandokan).

== See also ==
- List of Italian television series
- Sandokan (2025 TV series)
