= Alanah Bloor =

British actress (born 1999)

- Bloor at the 2026 Venice Film Festival
- Born: Alanah Caroline Bloor; 10 January 1999 (age 27); Truro, Cornwall, England
- Education: Helston Community College; East 15 Acting School (CertHE, 2019); Liverpool Institute for Performing Arts (BA, 2023)
- Occupation: Actress
- Years active: 2021–present
- Known for: Man vs Baby (2025); Sandokan (2025)
- Height: 1.68 m (5 ft 6 in)

Alanah Caroline Bloor (born 10 January 1999) is an English actress, best known for her award-winning performance in the Rai 1 series Sandokan (2025) and her role in the Netflix comedy Man vs Baby (2025).

== Early life and education ==
Bloor was born and raised in Cornwall. She attended Constantine Primary School and Helston Community College, where both of her parents, Gavin and Caroline, are teachers. She began her training at East 15 Acting School, obtaining her Certificate of Higher Education in 2019, and later graduated with a Bachelor of Arts (BA) in Acting from Liverpool Institute for the Performing Arts (LIPA) in 2023.

== Career ==
In 2022, Bloor played Lucy Honeychurch in A Room with a View at the Minack Theatre, directed by Rosa Higgs for the Bodkin Theatre company. Other stage plays in which she had a role include The Crucible (also at the Minack), The Seagull (as Nina Zarechnaya) and Machinal (as the stenographer and defence lawyer).

Bloor made her television debut in 2025 with main roles as Maddy in the Netflix spinoff miniseries Man vs Baby and Lady Marianne Guillonk in the Rai 1 adaptation of Sandokan. For her performance in the latter, she was awarded Revelation of the Year at the Capri Hollywood International Film Festival.

== Personal life ==
As of December 2025, Bloor is in a relationship with Fred Topping.

== Filmography ==
Year	Title	Role	Notes	Ref.
2021	Waves	Emma	Short film	
2021	Hysteric	Lauren	Short film	
2025	Man vs Baby	Maddy	Miniseries	
2025	Sandokan	Lady Marianne Guillonk	Main role	
2026	The Lost Thing	Unknown	Short film	
TBA	Lincoln in the Bardo	Anna	Live-action/animated film	
TBA	Yamas!	Honey Goode	Main role	
TBA	Eat Me!	Alice Larson	Main role	
