= Lincoln in the Bardo (film) =

- Directed by: Duke Johnson
- Screenplay by: George Saunders
- Based on: Lincoln in the Bardo by George Saunders
- Produced by: Duke Johnson; Tom Hanks; Gary Goetzman; Paul Young; Devon Young Rabinowitz
- Starring: Tom Hanks; André Holland; Willem Dafoe; Jonathan Bailey; Peter Dinklage; Colman Domingo; Bill Hader; Tom Waits; Meryl Streep
- Cinematography: John Mathieson
- Production companies: Playtone; Starburns Industries
- Country: United States
- Language: English

Lincoln in the Bardo is an upcoming American live-action/stop motion animated film directed by Duke Johnson. It is based on the 2017 novel by George Saunders, who also wrote the screenplay. The film stars Tom Hanks (who also produces the film) as Abraham Lincoln, alongside André Holland, Willem Dafoe, Jonathan Bailey, Peter Dinklage, Colman Domingo, Bill Hader, Tom Waits, and Meryl Streep.

== Premise ==
Abraham Lincoln grieves after his son William Wallace Lincoln's death.

== Cast ==
- Tom Hanks as Abraham Lincoln
- André Holland
- Alanah Bloor as Anna
- Mary Birdsong
- Jordan Luke Gage as Gilbert

=== Voices ===
- Willem Dafoe as Everly Thomas
- Jonathan Bailey as Roger Bevins
- Peter Dinklage as Hans Vollmann
- Meryl Streep as Abigail Blass / Elizabeth Crawford / Angel / Demon
- Colman Domingo as Thomas Havens
- Bill Hader as Eddie Baron / Rake
- Tom Waits as Jasper Randall / Demo

== Production ==
It was announced in February 2026 that Duke Johnson was set to direct the film, with the film mixing live action and stop motion. George Saunders, who wrote the novel, was set to adapt the screenplay, and Tom Hanks was cast as Abraham Lincoln. Willem Dafoe, Jonathan Bailey, and Peter Dinklage joined the cast in voice roles in August, and Meryl Streep, Colman Domingo, Bill Hader, and Tom Waits were added to the voice cast in September.

Live action filming took place in London.
