= List of 1997 box office number-one films in Italy =

This is a list of films which have placed number one at the box office in Italy during 1997. Amounts are in lire. Box office figures limited to 147 main situations, representing about 74% of potential income.

== Number one films ==
†	This implies the highest-grossing movie of the year.

#	Weekend ending	Film	Box office	Notes	Ref
1	January 5, 1997	The Cyclone	3,772,933,360		
2	January 12, 1997	The Cyclone	4,636,718,960		
3	January 19, 1997	The Cyclone	4,827,440,900		
4	January 26, 1997	The Cyclone	4,320,988,770		
5	February 2, 1997	The Cyclone	3,293,198,400		
6	February 9, 1997	The Cyclone	2,587,726,400		
7	February 16, 1997	The Cyclone	2,117,522,550		
8	February 23, 1997	Space Jam	2,697,347,400		
9	March 2, 1997	Space Jam	2,925,243,750		
10	March 9, 1997	Jerry Maguire	1,954,085,400		
11	March 16, 1997	Jerry Maguire	1,700,000,000		
12	March 23, 1997	101 Dalmatians	3,124,717,300	101 Dalmatians reached number one in its second week of release	
13	March 30, 1997	101 Dalmatians	2,787,663,400		
14	April 6, 1997	101 Dalmatians	1,867,754,300		
15	April 13, 1997	The Devil's Own	1,045,464,300	The Devil's Own reached number one in its third week of release	
16	April 20, 1997	Dante's Peak	1,140,536,800	Dante's Peak reached number one in its second week of release.	
17	April 27, 1997	Liar Liar	1,793,098,800		
18	May 4, 1997	Liar Liar	732,502,400		
19	May 11, 1997	The Saint	937,981,800		
20	May 18, 1997	The Saint	594,320,000		
21	May 25, 1997	Absolute Power	960,685,300		
22	June 1, 1997	Absolute Power	1,048,362,800		
23	June 8, 1997	Absolute Power	386,134,600		
24	June 15, 1997	Absolute Power	193,495,700		
25	June 22, 1997	Absolute Power	259,787,200		
26	June 29, 1997	Absolute Power	230,548,900		
27	July 6, 1997	Absolute Power	138,170,900		
28	July 13, 1997	Absolute Power	78,157,500		
29	July 20, 1997	Absolute Power	68,741,200		
30	July 27, 1997	The Cyclone	51,066,000	The Cyclone returned to number one in its 34th week of release	
31	August 3, 1997	The Cyclone	TBD		
32	August 10, 1997	The Cyclone	TBD		
33	August 17, 1997	Con Air	93,000,000		
34	August 24, 1997	Con Air	464,269,582	Gross for the week	
35	August 31, 1997	Batman & Robin	1,559,723,832		
36	September 7, 1997	The Lost World: Jurassic Park	3,269,994,000		
37	September 14, 1997	The Lost World: Jurassic Park	3,104,383,600		
38	September 21, 1997	Air Force One	1,990,936,500		
39	September 28, 1997	Air Force One	1,702,186,200		
40	October 5, 1997	Men in Black	3,362,698,040		
41	October 12, 1997	Men in Black	2,493,704,160		
42	October 19, 1997	Fireworks	9,279,744,000	Fireworks set an opening record in Italy with a gross of L17 billion nationally.	
43	October 26, 1997	Fireworks	9,008,930,000		
44	November 2, 1997	Fireworks	7,442,319,500		
45	November 9, 1997	Fireworks	4,092,331,800		
46	November 16, 1997	Fireworks	2,224,492,500		
47	November 23, 1997	Bean	4,589,872,500		
48	November 30, 1997	Bean	6,656,999,400		
49	December 7, 1997	Bean	3,541,069,400		
50	December 14, 1997	Hercules	1,905,936,300	Hercules reached number one in its fifth week of release	
51	December 21, 1997	Hercules	TBD		
52	December 28, 1997	Life Is Beautiful †	9,200,000,000		

== See also ==
- Lists of box office number-one films
