= Gang Related (TV series) =

2014 American action drama television series

- Genre: Action drama Crime drama
- Created by: Chris Morgan
- Starring: Ramon Rodriguez; Jay Hernandez; RZA; Sung Kang; Inbar Lavi; Rey Gallegos; Shantel VanSanten; Cliff Curtis; Terry O'Quinn
- Composer: Photek
- Country of origin: United States
- Original language: English
- No. of seasons: 1
- No. of episodes: 13

Production
- Executive producers: Chris Morgan; Scott Rosenbaum; Brian Grazer; Francie Calfo; Allen Hughes
- Producer: Howard Griffith
- Cinematography: Krishna Rao
- Editor: Elba Sanchez-Short
- Running time: 43 minutes
- Production companies: Imagine Television; Chris Morgan Productions; Skeeter Rosenbaum Productions; 20th Century Fox Television

Original release
- Network: Fox
- Release: May 22 – August 14, 2014

Gang Related is an American action drama television series that aired on Fox from May 22 to August 14, 2014. The network placed the original series order on May 8, 2013, for 13 episodes. On September 2, 2014, Fox cancelled the series.

== Plot ==
The series follows the personal and professional lives of the members of the elite Los Angeles Police Department's multi-agency Gang Task Force as they take on the city's most dangerous gangs, including one with which a task force member has ties.

Opening narration: (by Ramon Rodriguez)

My name is Ryan Lopez. After my parents died, the Acostas and Los Angelicos took me in and raised me as one of their own. To protect them, I was asked to go undercover as a member of the LAPD. Now I must walk the line between cop and criminal without being exposed.

== Cast ==
=== Main cast ===
- Ramon Rodriguez as Ryan Lopez: an LAPD detective and former U.S. Army Ranger who was taken in and raised by the Acosta family at a young age after the death of his father at age ten. He was born in a poor town in Mexico, and moved to the United States illegally with his new family at that time.
- Jay Hernandez as Daniel Acosta: son of the Acosta family who is working as an investment banker and is Ryan's childhood best friend.
- RZA as Cassius Green: DEA Agent and Ryan's second partner.
- Sung Kang as Tae Kim: FBI Agent and Veronica's partner. He has a sister, who suffered a brain injury and lives in a long-term care facility.
- Inbar Lavi as Veronika "Vee" Dotsen: ICE Agent and Tae's partner. She was stuck by a needle and is uncertain if she will be HIV positive. Her brother, Anton, is in prison for life. They are Russian.
- Rey Gallegos as Carlos Acosta: older son of Acosta family who is a lieutenant of the "Los Angelicos" gang.
- Shantel VanSanten as Jessica "Jess" Mary Chapel: Assistant District Attorney of Los Angeles County who is also Sam Chapel's daughter and Ryan's girlfriend.
- Cliff Curtis as Javier Acosta: Head of the Los Angelicos and patriarch of the Acosta family. His parents were illegally working at a restaurant when it burned down and the illegal workers all died. Javier and other people still in the basement escaped, but not his parents.
- Terry O'Quinn as Sam Chapel: Head of the LAPD Gang Task Force and father of Jessica Chapel. Chapel goes rogue at times to achieve justice.

=== Recurring cast ===
- Emilio Rivera as Tio Gordo: right-hand man of the Los Angelicos
- Jay Karnes as Paul Carter: an LAPD Internal Affairs detective investigating the circumstances surrounding the death of Ryan's partner
- Konstantin Lavysh as Anton Dotsen: brother of Vee Dotsen
- Philip Anthony-Rodriguez as Billy Cabrera: undercover agent working at Daniel's bank
- Lela Loren as Silvia: Daniel's fiancée, she is implied to have lingering feelings for Ryan. She was Ryan's girlfriend before he joined the Army. They went their separate ways. Her name is tattooed on his arm. When he came back, she was with Daniel.
- Amaury Nolasco as Matias: killer working for the Metas. He's famous for using his signature sledgehammer in executions.

== Episodes ==
No.	Title	Directed by	Written by	Original release date	Prod. code	U.S. viewers (millions)
1	"Pilot"	Allen Hughes	Chris Morgan	May 22, 2014	1AWZ79	2.93
Ryan Lopez's partner James is killed by Carlos Acosta, but Ryan cannot arrest him because of his double life with the Los Angelicos gang.
2	"Sangre por Sangre"	Nelson McCormick	Scott Rosenbaum & Chris Morgan	May 29, 2014	1AWZ01	3.15
Ryan and the GTF try to find the rival gang members who shot Carlos in order to prevent it escalating into a gang war as well as to hide Ryan's own involvement in the matter. Elsewhere, Internal Affairs Agent Paul Carter (Jay Karnes) continues his investigation into the circumstances surrounding the death of Ryan's partner.
3	"Pecados del Padre"	Richard J. Lewis	Jennifer M. Johnson	June 5, 2014	1AWZ02	2.86
The GTF are tasked with protecting a Colombian informant who is about to testify in federal court, but are ambushed while moving him and his family to safety, forcing Ryan to choose between his Task Force duties and revealing the snitch's whereabouts to assist the Acosta family's quest for legitimacy.
4	"Perros"	Michael Offer	Robert Munic	June 12, 2014	1AWZ03	2.70
The task force goes after the Russian mob expecting to find weapons when they uncover a human trafficking ring. Meanwhile Javier makes a deal to sell fishscale and puts his family in danger with the hopes that a deal will get them out.
5	"Invierno Cayó"	Allison Anders	Cameron Litvack	June 19, 2014	1AWZ04	2.47
Carlos wants to get involved with the business side of the family and joins the table. Meanwhile Cassius gets suspended after shooting a drugged-up kid with a gun.
6	"Entre Dos Tierras"	Milan Cheylov	Carolina Paiz	June 26, 2014	1AWZ05	2.41
Chapel's CI leads the GTF to a major takedown of one of Javier's shipments. A truck was "painted" with the cocaine. Javier realizes he has a mole and tests his people. The CI gives Chapel the location of an even larger shipment, but it was a trap to out the mole.
7	"Regreso del Infierno"	Nelson McCormick	Benjamin Daniel Lobato	July 3, 2014	1AWZ06	2.47
Javier is in a tight spot after his large fishscale shipment was taken by the police. Daniel is kidnapped and Javier has 24 hours to come up with the lost fishscale money. Meanwhile Chapel is convinced that his department has a mole and goes into overdrive to find the perpetrator.
8	"El Zorro y el Gallinero"	Félix Enríquez Alcalá	Christal Henry	July 10, 2014	1AWZ07	2.34
Javier continues to deal with the ramifications of the deal he made to get out of the business in 18 months. A man is killed to prove a point and if Javier's not careful, his family will end up dead too.
9	"Dia de Todos los Santos"	Christopher Misiano	Mark Valadez	July 17, 2014	1AWZ08	2.64
The search for the mole within the task force hits high gear. Chapel has the team do surveillance on a block party.
10	"El Buey y el Alacrán"	Nick Gomez	Eddie Gonzalez & Jeremy Haft	July 24, 2014	1AWZ09	2.40
Los Angelicos seek revenge for what they perceive as Ryan's betrayal, while Jessica is shocked by a discovery about Ryan.
11	"La Luz Verde"	David Boyd	Jennifer M. Johnson & Robert Munic	July 31, 2014	1AWZ10	2.27
Ryan believes he'll be in the clear after having Javier arrested, but the police continue to pursue the mole. With the Acostas being tapped and followed, Ryan isn't able to contact them.
12	"Almadena"	Milan Cheylov	Scott Rosenbaum & Cameron Litvack	August 7, 2014	1AWZ11	2.01
Ryan finds his secret duffle bag missing and heads to a safe house. He finds out that Jessica stole it and reaches out to her to explain. Meanwhile, Acosta gives up the Metas and the Gang Task Force takes down the drug lab and their bank. Also Jessica Chapel is murdered; her murderers are presumed to be the Metas in retaliation for a bust by GTF.
13	"Malandros"	Nelson McCormick	Scott Rosenbaum	August 14, 2014	1AWZ12	2.36
Chapel leads the team to Mexico in search of murder suspect Matias. Meanwhile, Daniel uses his wedding to broker a deal between Javier and Lavar Quintel. Ryan and Chapel find out that it was Javier that ordered the hit on Jessica. Ryan has Javier transferred to the Metas side of the prison where he is met with a welcome party.

== Critical reception ==
Reviews for the show were mixed. It holds a 41% approval rating with an average score of 5.69/10 on review aggregator site Rotten Tomatoes. The consensus states: "Gang Related focuses more on being dark and edgy than delivering an original narrative, resulting in a fairly ordinary cop drama." On Metacritic, it has a score of 52 out of 100, indicating "mixed or average reviews".

Dorothy Rabinowitz at The Wall Street Journal wrote: "the writing is sharp, the atmosphere thick with tension from, among other things, car and foot chases". In contrast, The Hollywood Reporter's Tim Goodman wrote: "it's pretty clear right away that you're dealing with a pile of clichés that, pushed together and financed, can never be more than dreadful".

== Development ==
In January 2013, Fox announced that it had received a pilot order for the project.

In February 2013, Ramon Rodriguez was the first to be cast as the protagonist Ryan Lopez - a gang member sent in to infiltrate the LAPD. Shortly after, Sung Kang was cast in the role of Tae Kim, Asian gang specialist on loan from the FBI who refuses to celebrate Ryan's achievements because he considers Ryan's tactics dangerous and wasteful. Jay Hernandez later joined the cast as Daniel Acosta, gang lord Javier Acosta's son, and Ryan's best friend since childhood.

In March 2013, RZA and Cliff Curtis were then added to the cast with Curtis cast in the role of Javier Acosta, the head of one of the most dangerous gangs in Los Angeles. RZA was signed onto the role as Cassius Green Ryan's partner and best friend on the Gang Task Force originally from the tough streets of Oakland. Shantel vanSanten was cast in the days following as a doctor who treats Ryan for his bullet wound injuries and the daughter of the gang task force's captain. Tom Berenger was originally cast as Sam Chapel, a tough, dynamic police chief who oversees the Gang Task Force but was later replaced by Terry O'Quinn.

On May 8, 2013, Fox officially picked up Gang Related to series for 13 episodes.
