= Desert of Fire (miniseries) =

- Written by: George Eastman
- Directed by: Enzo G. Castellari
- Music by: Stefano Mainetti
- Country of origin: Italy; Germany; France

Production
- Cinematography: Giancarlo Ferrando

Original release
- Release: 19 October – 2 November 1997

Desert of Fire is a 1997 TV miniseries directed by Enzo G. Castellari. It is a European co-production between Italy (where the miniseries was broadcast with the title Deserto di fuoco), Germany (where it is known as Prinzessin Amina - Das Geheimnis der Liebe) and France (where its title is Le désert de feu).

== Cast ==
- Anthony Delon as René / Ben
- Mandala Tayde as Amina
- Stéphane Freiss as Jacquot
- Arielle Dombasle as Magda
- Virna Lisi as Christine Duvivier
- Claudia Cardinale as Leila
- Vittorio Gassman as Tarek
- Marie Laforêt as Rama
- Fabio Testi as Diderot
- Giuliano Gemma as Tafud
- Franco Nero as Marcel Duvivier
- Mathieu Carrière as François Legrand
- Jean Sorel as Miller
- Christopher Buchholz as Dubai
- Orso Maria Guerrini as Alkan
- Luca Lionello as Selim
- Hans Peter Hallwachs as Jafar
