= Scott Rosenbaum =

American screenwriter and producer

- Rosenbaum in 2010
- Born: Philadelphia, Pennsylvania, U.S.
- Education: University of Michigan
- Occupations: Television writer; producer; showrunner
- Years active: 1999–present
- Spouse: Elizabeth Allen

Scott Rosenbaum is an American film and television screenwriter, producer, and showrunner. He has served as the executive producer and showrunner of multiple series including ABC's science fiction drama V, Fox's crime drama Gang Related, NBC's Chuck and as an executive producer on FX's drama The Shield.

== Biography ==
Rosenbaum graduated from the University of Michigan and is married to television director Elizabeth Allen Rosenbaum.

As an original member of The Shield writing staff, Rosenbaum won a Golden Globe for Best Drama, an American Film Institute Award for Best Television Drama as well as the George Foster Peabody Award. He was the executive producer and showrunner of Queen of the South for USA Network and, most recently, was the co-creator of the pirate drama Sandokan, a new adaptation of the Italian adventure novels by Emilio Salgari, which premiered in late 2025.

== Filmography ==
- Sandokan (2025), creator, writer
- Viva La Madness (2019), executive producer, creator
- Queen of the South (2016), executive producer
- Gang Related (2014), executive producer
- V (2010–2011), executive producer
- Chuck (2007–2010), executive producer
- The Shield (2002–2007), executive producer
- Grown Ups (2000), writer
