= Helston Community College =

Location
- Church Hill; Helston, Cornwall, TR13 8NR; 50.10694°N 5.27351°W

Information
- Type: Academy
- Local authority: Cornwall Council
- Trust: Truro and Penwith Multi Academy Trust
- Department for Education URN: 143981 Tables
- Ofsted: Reports
- Head teacher: Alex Lingard
- Gender: Co-educational
- Age: 11 to 18
- Colour: Blue
- Website: http://www.helston.cornwall.sch.uk/

Helston Community College (formerly Gwealhellis Secondary Modern School) is a co-educational secondary school and sixth form located in Helston in the English county of Cornwall.

== History and description ==
The south site of the school was previously a grammar school that had Derwent Coleridge as a headmaster. His pupils included Charles Kingsley, John Duke Coleridge, Richard Edmonds, Thomas Rowe Edmonds, John Rogers, Henry Trengrouse and James Trevenen.

Previously a foundation school administered by Cornwall Council and a Co-operative Trust, in June 2017 Helston Community College converted to academy status and became sponsored by the Southerly Point Co-operative Multi Academy Trust. The Department for Education transferred the College to Truro and Penwith MAT in January 2023 and Southerly Point Co-operative MAT was shut.

Helston Community College offers GCSEs, BTECs and City and Guilds courses as programmes of study for pupils, while students in the sixth form have the option to study from a range of A Levels and further BTECs.

Pupils from the school take part in the annual Furry Dance, an ancient Cornish custom which is held on the Feast of St. Michael (May 8).

The north site of the school was built and was opened officially April 2018. The original north site was demolished and the ground was used as a car park for the current school. The new building sits behind where the old one was, above an area which used to be a sports pitch. Demolition of the old building started on 17 October 2019.

The current north site (North Site 2.0) cost £17 million and the school had to fight for the funds in order to finish. Demolition of tld building finished at the start of September whereupon the work on the car park started.

The new building is 3-tiers tall and contains these floors:

- 3: Science/Computing
- 2: English/Maths
- 1: Canteen/Design Technology/Sports hall/Gym/Dance Studio/Food Technology

== Notable former pupils ==
- Alanah Bloor, actress
- Sharon Robinson, Antarctic researcher known for her work on climate change and bryophytes
- Petroc Trelawny, radio presenter, broadcaster, and author.
