= Vanesa Lorenzo =

Spanish model (born 1977)

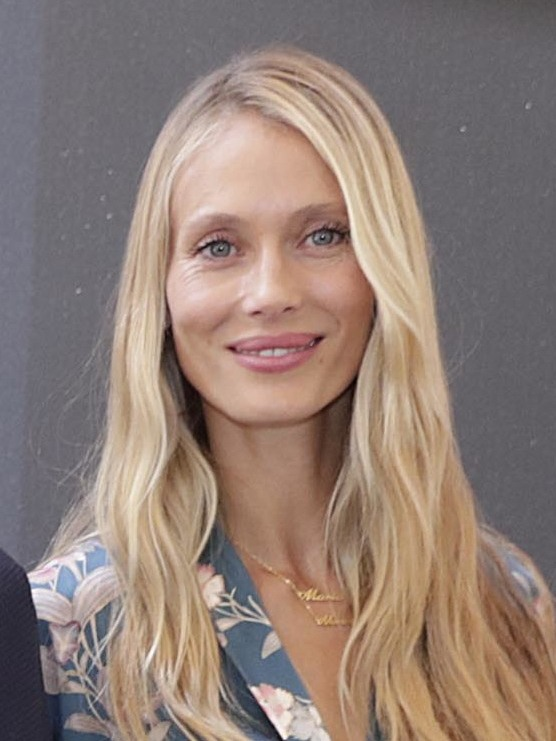
- Lorenzo in 2017
- Born: Vanesa Lorenzo; 7 January 1977 (age 49); Barcelona, Spain
- Modeling information
- Height: 1.72 m (5 ft 8 in)
- Hair color: Blonde
- Eye color: Blue
- Agency: The Model CoOp (NYC)

Vanesa Lorenzo (born 7 January 1977) is a Spanish model. She has been featured in magazines such as Vogue, ELLE, Cosmopolitan, Glamour, and Sports Illustrated Swimsuit Edition.

== Career ==
=== Modeling ===
Lorenzo started modeling when she was ten years old. At age 17, she left Spain for Paris where a local modeling agency thought her figure and characteristics would do well. The day after she arrived, she was rushed to London to shoot a campaign for Pepe Jeans. She then began to work internationally. She lived in Paris for three years, but always returned to Spain because of her family in Barcelona. Lorenzo currently lives in New York City.

Lorenzo was signed by the Group modeling agency at a young age. She finished second in the Elite Look of the Year modeling competition when she was 16.

Over the years, she has worked for companies like Pepe Jeans, Ralph Lauren, Escada, Giorgio Armani, L'Oreal, Yves Saint Laurent, Gap, Laura Biagiotti, Victoria's Secret, Christian Dior, and Pantene. She has appeared on the covers of Neo, Cosmopolitan, Self, Vogue, Amica, Lucky, Woman, Elle, and Glamour.

At 1.72 m (5 ft 8 in) tall, Lorenzo is sometimes classified as a "petite model", although the measurements for petite and regular fashion models are not strictly defined.

=== Acting ===
She appeared in the Catalan film Entreacte (1989), the successful Italian romantic comedy Fireworks (1997), and the short fantasy film El topo y el hada (1998).

=== Yoga ===
In 2016, Lorenzo released a yoga and wellness book titled Yoga, un estilo de vida (English: Yoga, a lifestyle). Between 2014 and 2019, Lorenzo had a YouTube channel with videos about yoga and her modeling.

== Personal life ==
Vanesa was born in Barcelona, Spain. She has been dating former FC Barcelona captain, Carles Puyol since 2012. They announced in September 2013 that they would be having a child. Puyol announced on 25 January 2014 that their daughter Manuela was born on 24 January 2014. On 2 January 2016 their second daughter Maria was born.
