= Hate 2 O =

- Promotional poster
- Directed by: Alex Infascelli
- Written by: Alex Infascelli; Vince Villani
- Produced by: Alex Infascelli; Gianluca Curti; Andrea Marotti; Alessandro Verdecchi
- Starring: Chiara Conti; Claire Falconer; Carolina Crescentini
- Cinematography: Arnaldo Catinari
- Edited by: Consuelo Catucci
- Music by: Harvestman
- Distributed by: Minerva Pictures
- Release dates: 5 May 2006 (Italy); 16 May 2006 (France)
- Running time: 95 minutes
- Country: Italy
- Language: Italian
- Budget: €1,000,000 (estimated)

Hate 2 O (H2Odio in Italy) is a 2006 film written, directed, and produced by Alex Infascelli. It is the follow-up to his 2004 film The Vanity Serum, considered by many to be his breakout film. It was released in Italy on 5 May 2006.

== Plot ==
A murky and polluted lake lies in malevolent hibernation behind a neglected cottage. Suddenly a large plastic garbage bag is thrown into it. It floats amidst the murk, hits the surface, and bumps clumsily into the base of a tree. Silence; until the plastic bag lunges and clings to the tree's branch. 2 girls (Olivia and Christina) stand at the edge of the lake, looking at its nauseating state. 3 others (Summer, Nicole, and Ana) are taking their suitcases out of the SUV parked in front of the cottage. Summer mentions how creepy it is. Ana confirms that it's absolutely perfect. Nicole drags her massive suitcase up the driveway. Christina and Olivia give each other a look, a nod, a smile; "well, let's do it." Isolating themselves for health and cleansing, 5 girls find that you need more than water to survive the past. (taken from IMDb, edited for spelling and grammar)

== Cast ==
Actor	Role
Chiara Conti	Olivia
Claire Falconer	Summer
Anapola Mushkadiz	Ana
Mandala Tayde	Nicole
