= Fireworks (1997 film) =

- Italian theatrical release poster
- Italian: Fuochi d'artificio
- Directed by: Leonardo Pieraccioni
- Written by: Leonardo Pieraccioni; Giovanni Veronesi
- Produced by: Vittorio Cecchi Gori
- Starring: Leonardo Pieraccioni; Vanessa Lorenzo; Massimo Ceccherini; Barbara Enrichi; Mandala Tayde; Claudia Gerini
- Cinematography: Roberto Forza
- Edited by: Jacopo Quadri
- Music by: Claudio Guidetti
- Distributed by: Cecchi Gori
- Release date: 10 October 1997
- Running time: 100 minutes
- Country: Italy
- Language: Italian
- Box office: $31.9 million

Fireworks (Italian: Fuochi d'artificio) is a 1997 Italian comedy film directed by Leonardo Pieraccioni.

== Plot ==
Ottone shares his story with a psychoanalyst he meets by chance on the beach of an exotic location where both are staying. He works in a pet shop with Lorenza, who is loved madly by Germano, his long-time and eccentric friend who has been sending her various gifts anonymously as "the anonymous donor".

After discovering his partner Mara's betrayal with the local butcher, Ottone moves into an apartment with two other tenants: his old friend Barbara, and her boyfriend Roberto, nicknamed "Er Patata" (Potato), who is under house arrest for assaulting a traffic officer. When Ottone returns home to find the couple in passionate sexual encounters, he seeks refuge upstairs with his neighbour Demiù, with whom he enjoys playing and doing small dances to Latin American music.

After several frustrating attempts to find a new girlfriend, Ottone meets the beautiful Luna through a work connection and falls immediately in love. However, Luna is wealthy, spoiled, and has a secret that hinders their relationship. When Luna's father reveals that she is married to a military cadet who is always away for work, Luna proposes that they continue their relationship as lovers. Ottone agrees, while Germano invites Lorenza on a blind date to reveal himself, but she mistakes him for the maître at the restaurant, leaving Germano disappointed.

The next morning, overhearing a conversation, Lorenza misunderstands Ottone's words, believing he is the mysterious anonymous admirer who had failed to show up for the previous day's date. During the party celebrating Patata's release from house arrest, Patata proposes to Barbara, who, shocked, flees. Barbara had previously confided in Ottone about her affair with the same butcher Mara had cheated on Ottone with. The next day, Barbara admits to Patata that she hasn't loved him for a long time but stayed because she couldn't leave during his house arrest. Roberto immediately returns to Rome. Meanwhile, Germano begins a relationship with Virginia, Roberto's sister, whom he met at the party and will marry a few months later. Ottone receives a letter from Luna, ending their relationship due to their incompatibility. The next morning, Lorenza seduces Ottone, but he soon meets Luna again, who regrets leaving him and proposes they go to the Caribbean together.

Lorenza and Barbara, who needs to distract herself from the end of her relationship with Roberto, both make similar proposals. Demiù is also leaving and stops by to say goodbye, as she finally has enough money to start her project of opening a place on an island. Left alone, Ottone reflects on whom he should leave with: Luna, Lorenza, or Barbara. The psychoanalyst, now intrigued by the story (which Ottone interrupted for an appointment), spends the day wondering with whom Ottone decided to go. That evening, he discovers that Ottone is running a bar on the island with Demiù, with whom he has become romantically involved, realizing that it was the brief moments spent playing and dancing with her that made him truly happy.

== Cast ==
- Leonardo Pieraccioni as Ottone
- Vanessa Lorenzo as Luna
- Massimo Ceccherini as Germano
- Barbara Enrichi as Barbara
- Mandala Tayde as Demiù
- Claudia Gerini as Lorenza
- Roberto Brunetti as Roberto "Er Patata"
- George Hilton as Gerard de la Fasse
- Milena Miconi as Virginia
- Luigi Petrucci as the psychoanalyst
- Bruno Bilotta as Er Tigre
- Claudio Santamaria as Er Banana
- Elisabetta Passan as La Lupa
- Bud Spencer as Gandhi the blind man
- Anita Caprioli as Mara
- Alessandro Haber as the actor

== Reception ==
Fireworks set an opening record in Italy with a gross of $13.5 million for the week from a record 610 screens. It was number one in Italy for five consecutive weekends. It went on to be the highest-grossing film in Italy for the year and grossed $31.9 million worldwide.
