= Alex Infascelli =

Italian actor, film director and screenwriter

- Born: 9 November 1967 (age 58); Rome, Italy
- Occupation: Director

Alex Infascelli (born 9 November 1967) is an Italian director, screenwriter and producer.

== Life and career ==
Born in Rome, the son of the producer Roberto and the nephew of the producer Carlo, Infascelli started his career as an assistant director for commercials and music videos. After directing he himself a number of music videos, in 1994 he directed a segment of the anthology film DeGenerazione. In 2000 he made his feature film debut with the thriller Almost Blue, which was well received both by critics and audience. For this film he won the David di Donatello for Best New Director as well as the Ciak d'oro and the Nastro d'Argento in the same category.

== Filmography ==
- DeGenerazione (1994, segment "Vuoto a rendere")
- Esercizi di stile (1996, segment "Se le rose pungeranno")
- Almost Blue (2000)
- The Vanity Serum (2004)
- Hate 2 O (2006)
- Donne assassine (TV, 2008)
- Nel nome del male (TV, 2009)
- S Is for Stanley (2015)
- My Name Is Francesco Totti (2020)
