= Sergio Sollima =

Italian film director and script writer

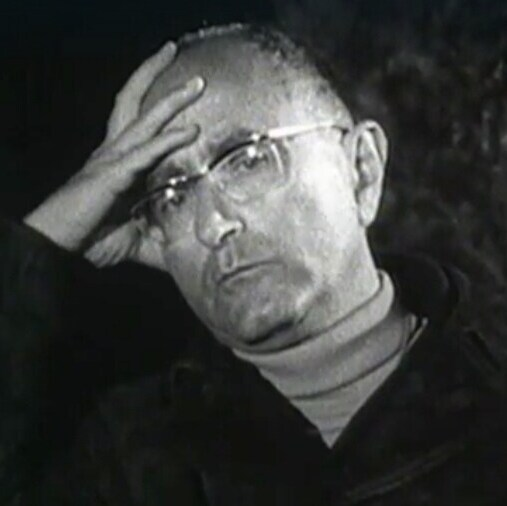
- Born: 17 April 1921; Rome, Lazio, Italy
- Died: 1 July 2015 (aged 94); Rome, Italy
- Other name: Simon Sterling
- Occupations: Film director, producer, screenwriter
- Years active: 1962–1998
- Children: Stefano Sollima

Sergio Sollima (17 April 1921 – 1 July 2015) was an Italian film director and script writer.

== Biography ==
Sollima graduated from the Centro Sperimentale di Cinematografia in 1935. During World War II he was in the Italian Resistance.

After the war, he gradually progressed from working as a film critic to screenwriting to becoming a director Like many Italian cult directors, Sollima started his career as a screenwriter in the 1950s and wrote many peplum films in the 1960s. He made his directing debut doing one of the four sequences in the anthology film Of Wayward Love. Sollima filmed three Eurospy films and then moved to spaghetti westerns. The Big Gundown (starring Lee Van Cleef and Tomas Milian) was released in 1966 with big success, despite the fact that it had to compete with Sergio Leone's The Good, the Bad and the Ugly and Sergio Corbucci's Django. Sollima soon filmed two more westerns. Face to Face (Milian and Gian Maria Volonté) was released in 1967 and Run, Man, Run! (Milian) in 1968. Although Sollima directed only three westerns and they never reached the level of popularity as the ones by the other Sergios (Leone and Corbucci), each of them is highly regarded among genre enthusiasts.

In 1970, Sollima switched genres again and directed the Charles Bronson and Telly Savalas starred Violent City, which was one of the first violent and fast-paced Italian crime films often known as poliziotteschi. Like for all of his westerns, the soundtrack was provided by Ennio Morricone. Sollima's last well-known film is Revolver, a poliziotteschi film starring Oliver Reed and Fabio Testi.

Sollima directed the six-part Italian TV series Sandokan starring Kabir Bedi with several feature films spun off the series.

== Selected filmography ==
- Tripoli, Beautiful Land of Love (1954)
- Of Wayward Love (1962)
- Agent 3S3: Passport to Hell (1965)
- Agent 3S3, Massacre in the Sun (1966)
- Requiem for a Secret Agent (1966)
- The Big Gundown (1967)
- Face to Face (1967)
- Run, Man, Run (1968)
- Violent City (1970)
- Devil in the Brain (1972)
- Revolver (1973)
- Sandokan (1976, TV miniseries)
- The Black Corsair (1976)
- La tigre è ancora viva: Sandokan alla riscossa! (1977)
