= Guido & Maurizio De Angelis =

Italian brothers, musical duo

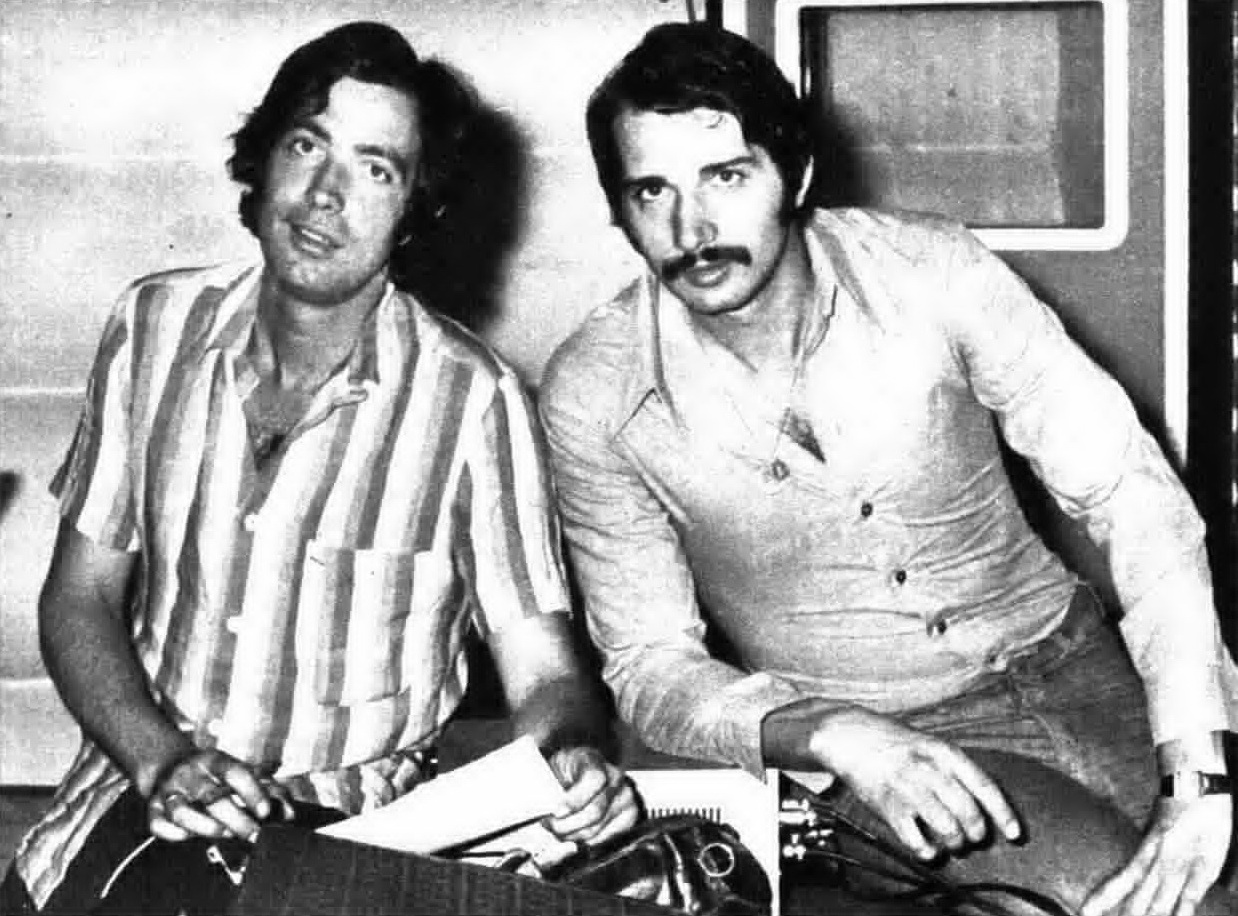
- Guido & Maurizio De Angelis in Radiocorriere magazine, 1975

Background information
- Also known as: Oliver Onions
- Origin: Rocca di Papa, Rome, Italy
- Genres: Film scores; pop; pop rock
- Years active: 1963–2016 (as Guido & Maurizio De Angelis, composers); 1971–1990, 2007–present (as Oliver Onions)
- Labels: RCA; Sony
- Members: Guido De Angelis; Maurizio De Angelis; Emanuele Giordani; Riccardo Di Vinci; Danny Bronzini; Filippo Piva; Francesco Signorini; Marco Zaga; Fabio Baù; Giovanni Forestan; Alberto "Zach" Gigante "Ray" Alberto Secondino
- Past members: Cesare De Natale; Susan Duncan-Smith
- Website: www.oliveronions.it

Guido and Maurizio De Angelis, also known as Oliver Onions, are a prolific duo of Italian musicians, multi-instrumentalists, composers and singers, as well as television and film producers. They reached the height of their popularity in the 1970s and early 1980s both as composers (under their own names) and as performers (as Oliver Onions), mainly thanks to their scoring and theme song composing and performing for action/comedy films starring the popular duo of Bud Spencer and Terence Hill, many of which became huge hits all across Europe, both cinematically and musically. After a period of retirement from the music business in the 1990s and early 2000s, during which they moved into television and film production through their own company (named after themselves), they had a musical comeback thanks to a one-off concert event in Budapest, Hungary, billed as Oliver Onions Reunion Live Budapest and organized by local promoter Gábor Kóves mainly because of the duo's popularity in his homeland, itself due to the fact that Spencer & Hill films were hugely popular in the country during the Communist regime - and, according to Maurizio De Angelis's commentary on the show, still are. The event, testified by the 2017 release of a double CD/DVD box set, led to a series of other successful shows in Italy and Europe in the following years.

== Beginnings ==
The brothers were born in Rocca di Papa, near Rome; Guido on 22 December 1944 and Maurizio on 22 February 1947. Their musical career started in 1963, when, after successfully releasing an LP, they became arrangers for RCA Italiana. Their success led to many more albums in which they composed and arranged the music and sang all the vocals.

== Oliver Onions ==
The De Angelis brothers were among the most prolific Italian musicians of the 1970s. In fact, they were forced to use different names for many of their projects to avoid over-saturating the market; during their career, they were variously known as G&M Orchestra, Barqueros, Charango, Kathy and Gulliver, Hombres del Mar and Dilly Dilly. However, the name they came to be mostly identified with, and most popular, was suggested by their frequent collaborator and lyricist Susan Duncan-Smith, a British-born journalist who worked in RCA's foreign relationships department. She advised them that, although they did not run any risks in signing their early Spaghetti Western film score work under their own names (following in the footsteps of the popularity gained by fellow Italian Ennio Morricone in the same genre), their international credibility as singers of theme songs in English would be undermined if they did not perform under an English-language name. The brothers followed Duncan-Smith's advice and named themselves Oliver Onions after the homonymous British writer; the name was chosen mostly because it was easy to remember for both people who speak English and people who do not, and because the two words are pronounced the same as they are written. In Italy, they became best known for writing and performing the theme song for Sergio Sollima's 1976 TV series Sandokan, based on novels by Emilio Salgari, which they also wrote the music score for; the song, heard under the opening credits, became a no.1 hit in the Italian pop charts in the same year. Their soundtrack for the 1981 cartoon series Viva i Re Magi (previously released in 1979, in Spanish language, in Mexico and Argentina as Vivan los Reyes Magos), for which they wrote the story and the screenplay as well as the full score and all the songs (which they sang themselves) was also a local hit.

Their recording "Santa Maria" was German number one single for six weeks in 1980 in its original Italian recording. It was followed by a German language version by Roland Kaiser, which was number one for another five weeks, see List of number-one hits of 1980 (Germany). The Roland Kaiser version was also number one in the Netherlands and Belgium.

== Film scores ==
Although they released many standalone albums, it is for their soundtrack work for which the De Angelis brothers are best known. Out of their many scores, which include the main theme for the 1983 Italian cult movie Yor, the Hunter from the Future, undoubtedly the most famous and popular are those composed for the Bud Spencer & Terence Hill action/adventure/comedy films, starting with Hill's "Trinity" Spaghetti Western trilogy. Most of their theme songs for the comedy duo's films were hits in every country where the films were released, became equally popular as the films themselves and almost synonymous with them. Their song "Dune Buggy", for the 1974 film Watch Out, We're Mad, topped the European charts.

Their scores included many cult Italian films such as Trinity Is Still My Name, Torso, High Crime, The Violent Professionals, Chino, Street Law, Violent Rome, The Big Racket, Mannaja, Slave of the Cannibal God, Killer Fish, and A Blade in the Dark. In 1978, they did an alternate version of the title song for The Return of the Saint TV show starring Ian Ogilvy. Their song "Taking It Easy" was used in the European versions of the show, where another version was used in English-speaking countries.

They are also known for their work on animated series, having composed original songs for Italian-dubbed anime (such as Doraemon, Ashita no Joe and Galaxy Express 999) and European series (such as Around the World with Willy Fog). They also composed the music for the cartoon series Dogtanian and the Three Muskehounds and Bobobobs.

== Later years: Withdrawal from music and comeback ==
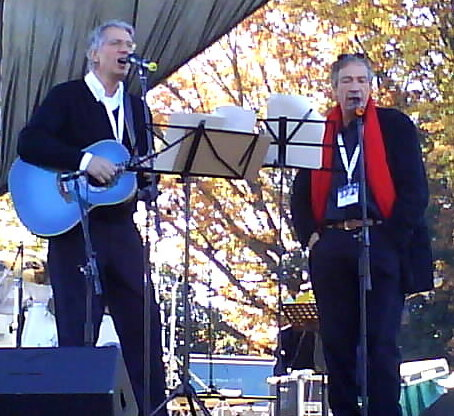
Guido (right) & Maurizio De Angelis at Lucca Comics Festival 2007

By the early 1990s the brothers had become disillusioned with the music business in general and in particular by their almost systematic lack of recognition as professional composers in Italy (although they were maintaining a solid fan base outside of their homeland). As a result of this, they decided to slowly withdraw from music composition and performance in order to move into the more behind-the-scenes, but also more profitable business of production for television series and films. During this period, the duo kept their musical output to the bare minimum, often limiting themselves to scores and soundtracks for their own television and cinematic productions, some of which were mainly composed and arranged by Maurizio (the duo's most musically active member) on his own, with his older brother Guido only providing basic melodic ideas; they still managed to score sizeable audience hits in the area of production, with long running drama/romantic series such as Elisa di Rivombrosa and Incantesimo (among several others), broadcast for several seasons respectively by Mediaset and RAI.

The first hint of their long-awaited return to music came in November 2007, when they performed their first concert as Oliver Onions in 25 years, at the Lucca Comics Festival. Nine years later, in July 2016, Hungarian music promoter and impresario Gábor Kóves asked them to put on an Oliver Onions "reunion" and perform their greatest hits live on stage, backed by a rock band and a full orchestra, in a one-off concert event meant both as a celebration of their career and a tribute to their then-recently departed friend Bud Spencer. According to Maurizio De Angelis's account of the episode in the liner notes for the 2017 audio/video release of the event, Kóves persuaded them to perform in Budapest by demonstrating to them how popular they still were in Hungary, showing them a large number of fan pages, both on Facebook and on the Internet in general, created by local fans as a tribute to them and to Spencer & Hill films. Maurizio also admitted that he and Guido were initially very reluctant to perform live, as they had not done so for many years and felt rusty and unprepared; in particular, Guido was utterly terrified at the prospect of singing lead vocals live, as he had been almost completely uninvolved in music for a very long time - having engaged himself only in film production. Still, the brothers decided to apply an old Italian proverb (known locally as the "Bicycle Rule"), which states that "Once you have learned how to ride a bicycle, you never forget". By applying that rule, they came back on their musical feet within one week of intensive studio rehearsals and, once they were actually reunited as musicians, the adrenaline rush was such that Guido managed to overcome his fears and apply the "Bicycle Rule" to himself as well. The event was hugely successful, both locally and elsewhere. Subsequently, it spawned a series of short but intense tours of Italy and Europe in the following years, all billed as Oliver Onions Is Still Our Name (parodying the title of their 1971 soundtrack for the second Terence Hill "Trinity" film). Their latest such tour ended on 30 October 2019 at Lucca Comics and Games and resumed in late summer of 2020, after a forced interruption due to the outbreak of the COVID-19 pandemic.

In October 2021, the duo released Future Memorabilia, a greatest hits album including re-recorded versions of their best-known film and TV theme songs, some of them performed as duets with popular Italian and international stars - namely, former Thegiornalisti frontman Tommaso Paradiso, Roland Kaiser, Claudio Baglioni, Elio from Elio e le Storie Tese (adding his peculiar voice to the duo's popular "Firefighters Choir" from Watch Out, We're Mad!, a staple of their live repertoire) and Elhaida Dani. The song "Banana Joe", from the same-titled 1982 film, includes vocal snippets performed by Bud Spencer, who sang it in the original film. The duo then started a tour of Italy to promote the album.

Their theme for Zorro (1975), "Zorro Is Back.", was featured in Wes Anderson's Bottle Rocket, and their song "Goodbye My Friend" (from the movie Street Law) featured on the soundtrack to Faster.

== Selected filmography ==
Year	Film	Directed by	Singles	Latest CD / digital release
1971	Between Miracles	Nino Manfredi		Digitmovies / DPDM011 / 2013
1971	Trastevere	Fausto Tozzi		Digitmovies / CDDM254 / 2014
1971	Trinity Is Still My Name	Enzo Barboni		Beat Records / DDJ30DLX / 2023
1972	Ipotesi sulla scomparsa di un fisico atomico (TV)	Leandro Castellani		Digitmovies / CDDM329 / 2023
1972	Sul filo della memoria (TV)	Leandro Castellani		Digitmovies / CDDM329 / 2023
1972	Man of the East	E.B. Clucher		Digitmovies / CDDM300 / 2019
1972	Father Jackleg	Enzo G. Castellari		GDM / GDM 4142 / 2011
1972	Il sindacalista	Luciano Salce		Digitmovies / CDDM205 / 2012
1972	All the Way, Boys	Giuseppe Colizzi		Beat Records / DDJ29DLX / 2022
1972	The Sicilian Connection	Ferdinando Baldi		Chris' Soundtrack Corner / CSC 003 / 2009
1973	Torso	Sergio Martino		Digitmovies / CDDM321 / 2023
1973	Delitto di regime - Il caso Don Minzoni (TV)	Leandro Castellani		Digitmovies / CDDM329 / 2023
1973	Tales of Canterbury	Roberto Loyola		Kronos Records / KRONGOLD016 / 2018
1973	Even Angels Eat Beans	Enzo Barboni		Beat Records / DDJ35DLX / 2024
1973	Giovannona Long-Thigh	Sergio Martino		
1973	High Crime	Enzo G. Castellari		Beat Records / CDCR150 / 2023
1973	The Violent Professionals	Sergio Martino		Beat Records / BCM9604 / 2022
1973	Chino	John Sturges		Legend / CD 37 DLX / 2011
1973	Flatfoot	Steno		Digitmovies / CDDM031 / 2005
1974	Dedicato a una coppia (TV)	Dante Guardamangna		Digitmovies / CDDM329 / 2023
1974	Street Law	Enzo G. Castellari		Digitmovies / CDDM325 / 2024
1974	L'arbitro	Luigi Filippo D'Amico		Digitmovies / CDDM230 / 2013
1974	Two Missionaries	Franco Rossi		
1974	Watch Out, We're Mad	Marcello Fondato		Digitmovies / CDDM315 / 2021
1974	Run, Run, Joe!	Giuseppe Colizzi		Digitmovies / CDDM126 / 2009
1974	Charleston (1974 film)	Enzo Barboni		Beat Records / DDJ35DLX / 2024
1974	Quaranta giorni di libertà (TV)	Leandro Castellani		Digitmovies / CDDM329 / 2023
1975	Shoot First... Ask Questions Later	Sergio Corbucci		
1975	Flatfoot in Hong Kong	Steno		Chris' Soundtrack Corner / CSC 035 / 2023
1975	The Immortal Bachelor	Marcello Fondato		Digitmovies / CDDM216 / 2012
1975	Scandal in the Family	Bruno Gaburro		Digitmovies / CDDM271 / 2014
1975	Legend of the Sea Wolf	Giuseppe Vari		
1975	Zorro	Duccio Tessari		Digitmovies / DGST043 / 2018
1975	The School Teacher	Nando Cicero		
1975	Convoy Buddies	Giuliano Carnimeo		Digitmovies / CDDM126 / 2009
1975	Violent Rome	Marino Girolami		Beat Records / CDCR 69 / 2006
1975	Cry, Onion!	Enzo G. Castellari		
1975	Il marsigliese (TV)	Giacomo Battiato		Digitmovies / CDDM329 / 2023
1976	Sandokan	Sergio Sollima		RCA / 74321432052 / 1996
1976	Sex with a Smile	Sergio Martino		Cometa Edizioni Musicali / CMT 10033 / 2012
1976	Soldier of Fortune	Pasquale Festa Campanile		Digitmovies / CDDM070 / 2006
1976	Sex for Sale	Luigi Filippo D'Amico		Quartet Records / QR449 / 2021
1976	The Cop in Blue Jeans	Bruno Corbucci		
1976	The Big Racket	Enzo G. Castellari		Chris' Soundtrack Corner / CSC 019 / 2016
1976	Confessions of a Frustrated Housewife	Andrea Bianchi		Digitmovies / CDDM188 / 2011
1976	This Violent World	Antonio Climati, Mario Morra		Quartet Records / QR341 / 2018
1976	Death Rage	Antonio Margheriti		
1976	Keoma	Enzo G. Castellari		Chris' Soundtrack Corner / CSC 029 / 2018
1976	Squadra antifurto	Bruno Corbucci		Beat Records / DDJ33DLX / 2024
1976	Languid Kisses, Wet Caresses	Alfredo Angeli		Vivi Musica / VCDS 7026 / 1999
1976	The Black Corsair	Sergio Sollima		Digitmovies / CDDM032 / 2005
1976	Mr. Robinson	Sergio Corbucci		Beat Records / DDJ08DLX / 2016
1977	Orzowei	Yves Allégret		Digitmovies / CDDM294 / 2018
1977	Crime Busters	Enzo Barboni		
1977	Charleston	Marcello Fondato		
1977	Messalina, Messalina	Bruno Corbucci		Cometa Edizioni Musicali / CMT 10027 / 2012
1977	Mannaja	Sergio Martino		Cometa Edizioni Musicali / CMT 10016 / 2011
1977	Swindle	Bruno Corbucci		
1977	Three Tigers Against Three Tigers	Sergio Corbucci, Steno		Digitmovies / CDDM158 / 2010
1977	La tigre è ancora viva: Sandokan alla riscossa!	Sergio Sollima		Digitmovies / CDDM297 / 2018
1977	Goodbye & Amen	Damiano Damiani		GDM / GDM4318 / 2013
1978	Flatfoot in Africa	Steno		Digitmovies / CDDM029 / 2005
1978	Slave of the Cannibal God	Sergio Martino		Cometa Edizioni Musicali / CMT 10027 / 2012
1978	They Called Him Bulldozer	Michele Lupo		Beat Records / DDJ18DLX / 2020
1978	Odds and Evens	Sergio Corbucci		
1979	Killer Fish	Antonio Margheriti		Quartet Records / QR179 / 2015
1979	The Sheriff and the Satellite Kid	Michele Lupo		Digitmovies / CDDM314 / 2020
1979	The House by the Edge of the Lake	Enzo G. Castellari		
1979	The Finzi Detective Agency	Bruno Corbucci		Digitmovies / CDDM158 / 2010
1979	The Shark Hunter	Enzo G. Castellari		Chris' Soundtrack Corner / CSC 029 / 2018
1979	Switch (1979 film)	Giuseppe Colizzi		Beat Records / DDJ062 / 2025
1980	Flatfoot in Egypt	Steno		Beat Records / DDJ27DLX / 2023
1980	Alien 2: On Earth	Ciro Ippolito		Beat Records / DDJ052 / 2019
1980	Everything Happens to Me	Michele Lupo		Beat Records / DDJ32DLX / 2024
1981	The Last Shark	Enzo G. Castellari		Beat Records / DDJ051 / 2019
1982	Banana Joe	Stefano Vanzina		Beat Records / DDJ28DLX / 2023
1982	Bomber	Michele Lupo		Beat Records / DDJ17DLX / 2019
1983	Yor, the Hunter from the Future	Antonio Margheriti		BSX Records / BSXCD 8890 / 2011
1983	Ironmaster (film)	Umberto Lenzi		Beat Records / DDJ060 / 2024
1983	2019, After the Fall of New York	Sergio Martino		Beat Records / DDJ053 / 2020
1983	A Blade in the Dark	Lamberto Bava		
1983	The Atlantis Interceptors	Ruggero Deodato		Beat Records / DDJ056 / 2023
1983	Occhio, malocchio, prezzemolo e finocchio	Sergio Martino		Beat Records / DDJ19DLX / 2020
1984	Malombra	Bruno Gaburro		Hexacord / HCD 18 / 2003
1984	Pianoforte	Francesca Comencini		
1984	Trainer on the Beach	Sergio Martino		Beat Records / DDJ16DLX / 2018
1985	My Dearest Son	Valentino Orsini		

== Oliver Onions personnel ==
=== 1971–1990 ===
- Guido De Angelis - Lead and backing vocals, guitars, percussion
- Maurizio De Angelis - Lead and backing vocals, guitars, piano, keyboards, synths
- Cesare De Natale - Backing vocals, lyricist, co-composer
- Susan Duncan-Smith - English-language lyricist, backing vocals

=== 2007–present ===
- Guido De Angelis - Vocals
- Maurizio De Angelis - Vocals, guitars, mandolin, piano, keyboards
- Emanuele Giordani - Drum kit
- Riccardo Di Vinci - Bass guitar
- Danny Bronzini - Guitars
- Filippo Piva - Guitars, vocals
- Francesco Signorini - Keyboards
- Marco Zago - Keyboards
- Fabio Baù - Trumpet, French horn
- Giovanni Forestan - Saxophone, flute, clarinet
- Alberto "Zach" Gigante - Additional vocals
- "Ray" Alberto Secondino - Additional vocals
- Oliver Onions' 2016 comeback show in Budapest also featured a string quartet and six female backing vocalists, as well as Hungarian orchestra Magyar Studió Zenekar and session choir Cinema Studió Kórus.

== Discography ==
=== As Oliver Onions ===
==== Albums ====
- See You Later (1974)
- Greatest Hits (1977) – GER #32
- Bulldozer (1979)
- Six Ways (1979)
- Santa Maria (1980) – GER #42, AUT #12
- Brigitte Aerobic (1983; Germany)
- Best of Bud Spencer & Terence Hill (1992; Germany) – GER #51
- Future Memorabilia (2021)

==== Singles ====
Year	Single	Chart positions							
Year	Single	AUT	BE (FLA)	BE (WA)	ESP	GER	IT	NL	SUI
1973	"Flying Through the Air"	8	-	-	-	4	8	-	-
1973	"Christine" (Germany-only release)	-	-	-	-	-	-	-	-
1973	"Afyon - Oppio" (Italy-only release)	-	-	-	-	-	-	-	-
1974	"Dune Buggy"	12	-	-	-	8	2	-	-
1974	"Why Is Everyone So Mad"	-	-	-	-	-	-	-	-
1974	"Take It Easy Joe"	-	-	-	-	-	-	-	-
1974	"Springtime in Rome" (France-only release)	-	-	-	-	-	-	-	-
1975	"Zorro Is Back"	-	-	-	-	-	24	-	-
1976	"Sandokan"	-	17	24	1	13	2	8	4
1977	"Orzowei"	3	-	-	27	1	9	-	7
1977	"Space" (Germany-only release)	-	-	-	-	-	-	-	-
1977	"Mago" (Italy-only release)	-	-	-	-	-	-	-	-
1978	"Taking It Easy"	-	-	-	-	-	-	-	-
1978	"Bulldozer"	-	-	-	-	2	-	-	-
1978	"I Don't Mind Tomorrow"	-	-	-	-	-	-	-	-
1978	"La Libertá"	-	-	-	-	-	-	-	-
1978	"Miss Robot" (Germany-only release)	-	-	-	-	-	-	-	-
1978	"Cock A Doodle Doo" (Germany-only release)	-	-	-	-	-	-	-	-
1978	"Mompracem" (Italy-only release)	-	-	-	-	-	-	-	-
1979	"Six Ways"	-	-	-	-	-	-	-	-
1979	"Sheriff"	-	-	-	-	-	-	-	-
1979	"S.O.S. Spazio 1999" (Italy-only release)	-	-	-	-	-	29	-	-
1979	"Oh Na Na Na" (Italy-only release)	-	-	-	-	-	-	-	-
1980	"Tomorrow Is Today"	-	-	-	-	-	-	-	-
1980	"Santa Maria"	1	-	-	-	1	-	-	2
1981	"Lulù"	-	-	-	-	65	-	-	-
1981	"Quanto Sei Bella Stasera"	-	-	-	-	-	-	-	-
1981	"Le Avventure di Marco Polo" (Italy-only release)	-	-	-	-	-	-	-	-
1982	"Fantasy"	-	-	-	-	-	-	-	-
1982	"Galaxy" (Italy-only release)	-	-	-	-	-	-	-	-
1982	"Piccola Bambola"	-	-	-	-	-	-	-	-
1984	"Pizza" (Germany-only release)	-	-	-	-	-	-	-	-
1984	"Gabbiano" (Germany-only release)	-	-	-	-	-	-	-	-
1984	"Ghost" (Germany-only release)	-	-	-	-	-	-	-	-
1985	"Supernoses" (Germany-only release)	-	-	-	-	-	-	-	-
