= Devil in the Brain =

- Directed by: Sergio Sollima
- Written by: Suso Cecchi d'Amico; Sergio Sollima
- Starring: Stefania Sandrelli; Keir Dullea; Micheline Presle; Tino Buazzelli; Maurice Ronet
- Cinematography: Aldo Scavarda
- Music by: Ennio Morricone
- Release date: 13 April 1972
- Language: Italian

Devil in the Brain (Italian: Il diavolo nel cervello) is a 1972 Italian psychological thriller film.

== Plot ==
Oscar Minno returns from working several years overseas and looks up his old flame Sandra. Sandra is widowed and lives in a childlike mental state on her family's estate, cared for by the overprotective Countess de Blanc. Sandra's son, Ricky, is suspected of having killed his father, Fabrizio, as well as a vagrant trespassing on the estate. Ricky is then sent to a reform school run by nuns. Oscar's doctor friend believes that Ricky is mentally fit and begins to suspect that there is much more to the story.

== Cast ==
- Keir Dullea as Oscar Minno
- Stefania Sandrelli as Sandra Garces
- Micheline Presle as Countess Claudia Osorio De Blanc
- Maurice Ronet as Fabrizio Garces
- Tino Buazzelli as Doctor Emilio Bontempi
- Renato Cestiè as Ricky Garces
- Orchidea de Santis as Caterina
- Gaia Germani as Bianca Molteni

== See also ==
- List of Italian films of 1972
