= La tigre è ancora viva: Sandokan alla riscossa! =

1977 film by Sergio Sollima

- Film poster
- Directed by: Sergio Sollima
- Written by: Sergio Sollima; Alberto Silvestri
- Based on: Emilio Salgari (novels)
- Produced by: Elio Scardamaglia
- Starring: Kabir Bedi; Philippe Leroy; Adolfo Celi; Sal Borgese
- Cinematography: Marcello Masciocchi
- Edited by: Alberto Gallitti
- Music by: Oliver Onions
- Production companies: Leone Film; Rizzoli Film
- Distributed by: Cineriz
- Release date: 22 December 1977
- Running time: 130 minutes
- Country: Italy
- Language: Italian

La tigre è ancora viva: Sandokan alla riscossa! (transl. The tiger is still alive: Sandokan to the rescue!) is a 1977 Italian adventure film directed by Sergio Sollima and starring Kabir Bedi. It follows on from the 1976 television series Sandokan, itself inspired by the series of novels by Emilio Salgari featuring the pirate hero Sandokan.

== Plot ==
Sultan Abdullah conquers the island of Mompracem, the haunt of Sandokan's pirates. The sultan is a puppet of the British army, very happy to have sent into exile Sandokan. Lord James Brooke, the new governor of the British soldiers, discovers where Sandokan is: the pirate is trying a new assault together Mompracem with the Indian princess Jamilah; and so man calls himself the powerful thugs, the killers of the Ganges, the bloodthirsty goddess worshiped Kali. Sandokan soon realizes that his fight for the reconquest of the island of Mompracem is not easy. In fact James Brooke calls the thugs, and all the wild populations of India, who are hungry and thirsty for booty.

== Production ==
In April 1977, Stampa Sera reported that the sequel was in preparation under the working title Il suo nome è Sandokan and that Kabir Bedi and Parveen Babi had come to Rome to sign their contracts. Babi was expected to play a composite character inspired by several of Emilio Salgari's novels. In the finished film, Teresa Ann Savoy played Jamilah, a character created by Sollima who becomes Sandokan's new love interest after Marianna's death.

== Cast ==
- Kabir Bedi as Sandokan
- Philippe Leroy as Yanez de Gomera
- Adolfo Celi as James Brooke
- Sal Borgese as Kammamuri
- Massimo Foschi as Teotokris
- Néstor Garay as Sultan Abdullah
- Mirella D'Angelo as Surama
- Teresa Ann Savoy as Jamilah
- Franco Fantasia as Colonel
