= Massimo Volume =

Italian rock group

- Massimo Volume in 2020

Background information
- Origin: Bologna, Italy
- Genres: Post-rock, math rock, noise rock
- Years active: 1992–2002; 2008–present
- Label: Sonica Studios
- Members: Emidio Clementi; Egle Sommacal; Vittoria Burattini
- Past members: Gabriele Ceci; Umberto Palazzo; Metello Orsini; Marcella Riccardi; Dario Parisini; Stefano Pilia

Massimo Volume is an Italian rock group formed in Bologna in 1992. They sing in Italian and the singer is well known for his poetic spoken-word style. Their musical style may be described as being akin to post-rock: their sound is built on guitars and drums, but rhythms are often complex and articulated, while the guitar effects are also used to effect. The structure of their songs completely avoids the verse-chorus form: in its place, their pieces tend to describe an atmosphere or a soundscape complemented by the spoken words.

Massimo Volume reached some notoriety in the Italian Independent Music scene in the late 1990s, particularly with the release of critically acclaimed "Lungo i Bordi" and "Club Privé". The band dismantled in the early 2000s: during this period, their bassist and lyricist, Emidio Clementi, published a series of books. However, the band reunited again in the late 2000s and in 2010 released new material collected in the CD "Cattive Abitudini" (translating as "Bad Habits"), which has been followed by another CD in 2013 "Aspettando i Barbari" (translating as "Waiting for the Barbarians"). In February 2019 the band, now recording as a trio, released Il nuotatore on 42 Records.

== Discography ==
=== LP ===
- Stanze, Underground Records 1993
- Lungo i bordi, Mescal 1995
- Da qui, Mescal 1997
- Club Privé, Mescal, 1999
- Cattive Abitudini, La Tempesta 2010
- Aspettando i Barbari, La Tempesta 2013
- Il Nuotatore, 42 Records 2019

=== Compilations ===
- Fuoco fatuo in Metal Machine Muzak, 1997

=== Soundtracks ===
- Almost Blue, Cecchi Gori Music 2001

=== Singles/Music Videos ===
- 1995 – Il Primo Dio
- 2010 – Fausto
- 2011 – Un Altro Domani
- 2013 – La Cena

== Line-up ==
- Emidio Clementi: bass, vocals
- Egle Sommacal: guitars
- Vittoria Burattini: drums, percussions

=== Other members ===
- Gabriele Ceci – guitars (1991–1997)
- Umberto Palazzo – guitars, vocals (1991–1992)
- Metello Orsini – guitars (1997–1999)
- Marcella Riccardi – guitars, vocals (1999–2002)
- Dario Parisini – guitars (1999–2000)
- Stefano Pilia – guitars (2008)
