= Kabir Bedi =

Indian film actor (born 1946)

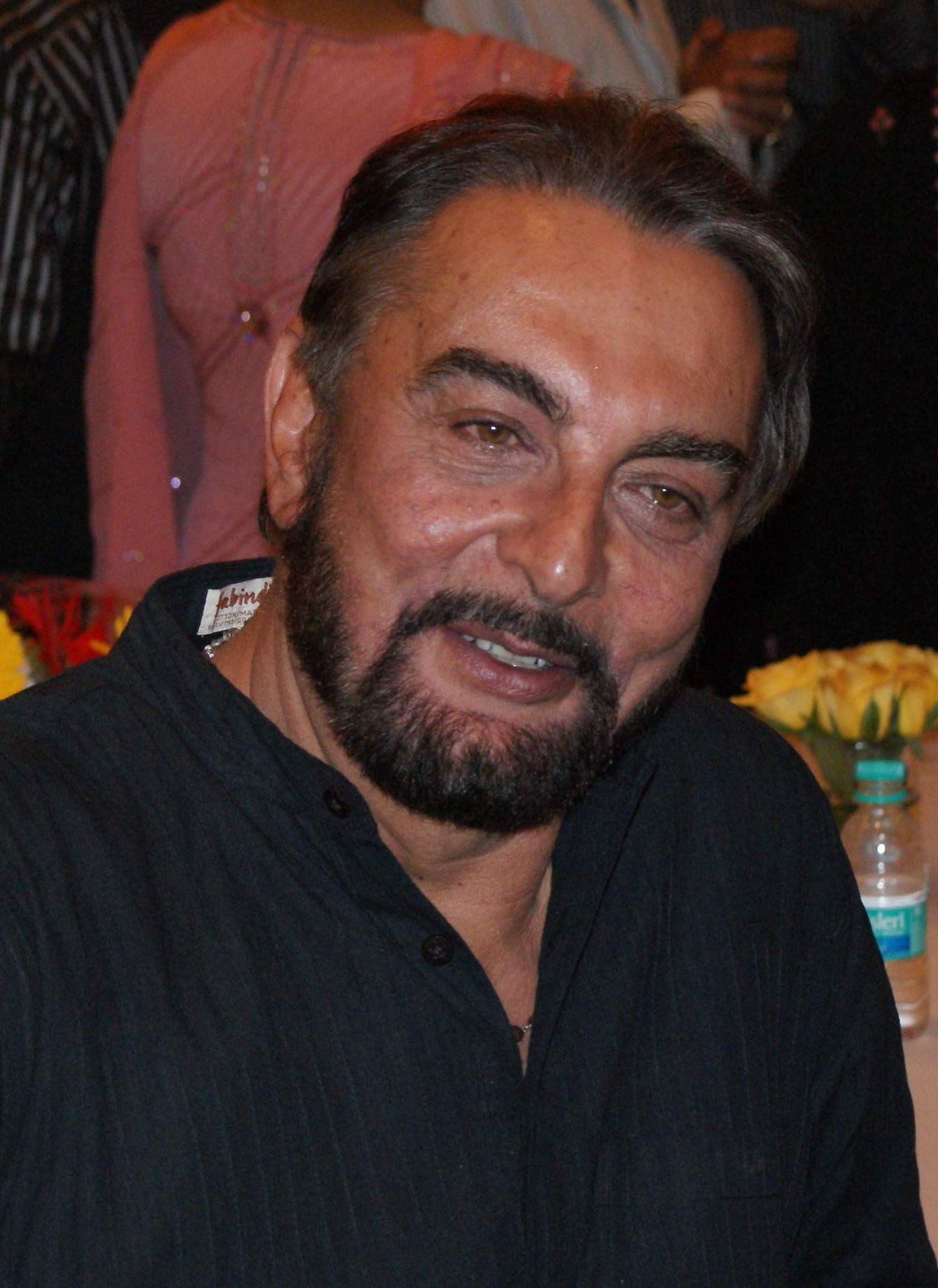
- Bedi in 2012
- Born: 16 January 1946 (age 80); Lahore, Punjab, British India (now in Punjab, Pakistan)
- Occupations: Actor; television presenter
- Years active: 1971–present
- Spouses: Protima Gauri (m. 1969; div. 1974); Susan Humphreys (m. 1980; div. 1990); Nikki Moolgaoker (m. 1992; div. 2005); Parveen Dusanj (m. 2016)
- Children: 3, including Pooja
- Mother: Freda Bedi
- Relatives: Alaya F (grand-daughter)
- Honors: Order of Merit of the Italian Republic

Kabir Bedi (born 16 January 1946) is an Indian actor. His career has spanned three continents covering India, the United States and especially Italy among other Western countries in three media: film, television and theatre. He is noted for his role as Emperor Shah Jahan in Taj Mahal: An Eternal Love Story and the villainous Sanjay Verma in the 1988 film Khoon Bhari Maang. He is best known in Italy and Europe for playing the pirate Sandokan in the Italian TV miniseries and for his role as the villainous Gobinda in the 1983 James Bond film Octopussy. Bedi is based in India and lives in Mumbai.

== Early life and education ==
Kabir Bedi was born in Lahore in the Punjab Province of British India (now in Punjab, Pakistan) on 16 January 1946. His father, Baba Pyare Lal Singh Bedi, was a Punjabi Sikh author, philosopher and a direct descendant of Guru Nanak. His mother, Freda Bedi, was an English woman born in Derby, who became famous as the first Western woman to take ordination in Tibetan Buddhism. He was educated at Sherwood College in Nainital, Uttarakhand, Delhi Public School Mathura Road and St. Stephen's College in Delhi.

== Career ==
Bedi began his career in Indian theatre and then moved on to Hindi films. He remains one of the first international actors from India who started out in Hindi films, worked in Hollywood films and became a star in Europe.

His first appearance on television was as a newsreader on Doordarshan's news programme Mirror of the World, at a time when its signal only reached Delhi.

Shortly after the success of the Sandokan miniseries in Europe, by 1978, he was considering moving to Los Angeles in order to follow a more active role in the US film industry, using an apartment there as his base. He also suggested changing his name to sound more English.

=== Stage acting ===
As a stage actor, Bedi has performed Shakespeare's Othello as well as portrayed a historical Indian king in Tughlaq, and a self-destructive alcoholic in The Vultures. In London he starred in The Far Pavilions, the West End musical adaptation of M. M. Kaye's novel, at the Shaftesbury Theatre. In 2011 Bedi played Emperor Shah Jahan in Taj, a play written by John Murrell, a Canadian playwright for the Luminato Festival in Toronto. In 2013, this play was recommissioned and went on an eight-week multi-city tour of Canada.

=== Film career ===
In the James Bond film Octopussy, Bedi played the villain's aide Gobinda.

He has acted in over 60 Indian films. In the historical epic Taj Mahal: An Eternal Love Story, he starred as the Emperor Shah Jahan. Other starring Hindi film roles include Raj Khosla's Kuchhe Dhaage, Rakesh Roshan's Khoon Bhari Maang and Farah Khan's Main Hoon Na.

Bedi shot a movie with Hrithik Roshan (Kites), Govinda (Showman), and Akshay Kumar (Blue). He acted in the Tamil film Aravaan, directed by Vasanthabalan.

Bedi played roles in Columbia Pictures' The Beast of War, a film on the Russian war in Afghanistan, directed by Kevin Reynolds, as well as the acclaimed Italian film Andata Ritorno, by Marco Ponti, winner of the David di Donatello Award. In 2017, he acted in the Telugu historical movie Gautamiputra Satakarni, as Nahapana, an important ruler of the Western Kshatrapas.

=== Television career ===
Bedi has appeared on American television, in Hallmark's African epic Forbidden Territory, and Ken Follett's On Wings of Eagles and Red Eagle. He played Friar Sands in The Lost Empire, for NBC. He also acted in Dynasty, Murder, She Wrote, Magnum, P.I., Hunter, Knight Rider and Highlander: The Series.

In Europe, his greatest success was Sandokan, the saga of a romantic Southeast Asian pirate during British colonial times, an Italian-German-French TV series which broke viewership records across Europe. In 2007, he starred in the fifth season of a prime-time Italian television series, Un Medico in Famiglia, on RAI TV, playing the role of Kabir Dahvi, an Indian immigrant who opened a restaurant. A cameo in the 2025 series, whose title character is played by Can Yaman and whose second season was entering pre-production in December 2025, is on the cards.

For over a year, Bedi starred in The Bold and the Beautiful, the second most-watched television show in the world, seen by over a billion people in 149 countries.

He had his own cinematic talk show on Indian TV, Director's Cut, a 13-part special series interviewing the country's leading directors. His success on television continued in 2013 with award-winning prime-time shows Guns and Glory: The Indian Soldier and Vandemataram, for India's news channels Headlines Today and Aaj Tak.

Kabir Bedi after receiving his knighthood

In the Indian Biblical television series Bible Ki Kahaniya, Bedi played both the young and aged Abraham.

=== Radio career ===
In 2007, he starred in Chat, a radio show aired by Rai Radio 2, in the role of Sandokan. In 2012, he did a series of Radio One programmes titled Women of Gold and Men of Steel in honour of industry champions in India. In 2017 he did another series in English for Radio One, Ten on Ten, celebrating the top ten innovations out of India. He also did the year-end special series, Best of 2017.

=== Writing ===
Bedi is a regular contributor to Indian publications including the Times of India and Tehelka on political and social issues affecting the country. He is also seen debating such topics on Indian national television.

=== Charity ===
In February 2017, Bedi was announced as the new 'brand ambassador' for international development organisation, Sightsavers, saying on his appointment, "Today there is immense awareness and attempt towards eye health and care in India and Sightsavers have shown way to people at large in the country with their achievements in the area of eye care." Bedi is the honorary brand ambassador for Italian Charity Care and Share Italia, which educates and looks after street children, from school to university, in Andhra Pradesh and Telegana.

=== Awards and achievements ===
Since 1982, Bedi has been a voting member of the Academy of Motion Picture Arts and Sciences (who are responsible for presenting the Oscar awards). He is also a voting member of the Screen Actors Guild.

He has won numerous film, advertising and popularity awards across Europe and India.

By decree of the President of the Italian Republic of 2 June 2010, Bedi was officially knighted. He received the highest ranking civilian honour of the Italian Republic and was bestowed the title of "Cavaliere" (Knight) of the Order of Merit of the Italian Republic. He has recently received Honorary Degree from Kalinga Institute of Industrial Technology (KIIT) University, Bhubaneswar, Odisha, India.

== Personal life ==
Bedi married four times and had three children, Pooja, Siddharth (deceased) and Adam. He was married to Protima Bedi, an Odissi dancer. Their daughter Pooja Bedi is a magazine / newspaper columnist and former actress. Siddharth, who attended Carnegie Mellon University, was diagnosed with schizophrenia and died by suicide in 1997 at the age of 26.

As his marriage to Protima began to break down, he started a relationship with Parveen Babi. They never married. He later married British-born fashion designer Susan Humphreys. Their son, Adam Bedi, is an international model who made his Hindi film debut with the thriller Hello? Kaun Hai!. This marriage ended in divorce.

In the early 1990s, Bedi married TV and radio presenter Nikki Bedi. They had no children and divorced in 2005. After that, Bedi started a relationship with British-born Parveen Dusanj, whom he married a day before his 70th birthday.

Bedi was ordained as a Buddhist monk in Myanmar when he was about 10 years old. He has been practising Buddhism for many years. He supports the anti-government struggle in Myanmar, and he is an official ambassador of the Burma Campaign UK. He is the brand ambassador for Rotary International South Asia for its Teach Programme and the Total Literacy Mission in India and South Asia.

== Filmography ==
=== Films ===
Year	Film title	Character
1971	Hulchul	Mahesh Jetley #3
1971	Seema	
1972	Rakhi Aur Hathkadi	Suraj
1972	Sazaa	Brijmohan
1972	Anokha Daan	
1973	Kuchhe Dhaage	Pandit Tulsiram / Daku Roopa
1973	Yauwan	Jhumru
1974	Manzilein Aur Bhi Hain	
1974	Maa Bahen Aur Biwi	
1974	Ishk Ishk Ishk	Diwana/Ravikant Vyas
1975	Anari	Vikram
1975	Daaku	Daku Raju
1976	Nagin	Uday
1976	Harfan Maula	Faulad Singh
1976	Bullet	Durga Prasad
1976	The Black Corsair	The Black Corsair (Italy)
1977	Daku Aur Mahatma	Sangram Singh
1977	Vishwasghaat	Uday
1977	La tigre è ancora viva: Sandokan alla riscossa!	Sandokan
1978	The Thief of Baghdad	Prince Taj
1979	Ashanti	Malik
1979	Aakhri Kasam	Kishan / Badal
1979	Yuvraaj	Samrat Surya Dev Singh
1981	The Archer: Fugitive from the Empire	Gar
1982	40 Days of Musa Dagh	Gabriel Bagradian
1982	Satan's Mistress	The Spirit
1982	Girl from India	Artist
1983	Octopussy	Gobinda
1988	Counterforce	Koura
1988	Khoon Bhari Maang	Sanjay Verma
1988	Mera Shikar	Ravi
1988	The Beast	Akbar
1990	Police Public	Senior Inspector Shah Nawaz Khan
1990	Haar Jeet	
1990	Shera Shamshera	Shankar
1991	Kurbaan	Inspector Suraj Singh
1991	Yeh Aag Kab Bujhegi	Ranveer Singh
1991	Vishkanya	Forest Officer Vikram Singh
1992	Dil Aashna Hai	Rai Bahadur Digvijay Singh
1992	Yalgaar	Raj Pratap Singhal
1992	Beyond Justice	Moulet
1992	Lambu Dada	Lambu Dada
1993	Kshatriya	Police Officer Thakur Ganga Singh
1993	Yugandhar	Colonel Kanir
1994	Salaami	Captain Rehmat Khan
1994	Lie Down with Lions	Kabir
1994	The Maharaja's Daughter	Chandragupta
1995	OP Centre	Abdul Fazawi
1995	Kismat	Rajan
1995	Aatank Hi Aatank	Police Inspector
1998	Mashamal – Ritorno al Deserto	Tahar Id Bran
1999	Kohram	Brigadier Bedi
2001	The Lost Empire	Friar Sand
2002	Kranti	Mahendra Pratap Rana
2002	Maine Dil Tujhko Diya	Mr. Verma (Ayesha's Father)
2003	Talaash	Chhote Pathan
2003	The Hero: Love Story of a Spy	Mr. Zakaria
2004	Father	Karl (Father & Violinist)
2004	Rudraksh	Pandit Ved Bhushan
2004	Asambhav	
2004	Kismat	Raj Maliya
2004	Roundtrip	Tolstoj (Italian film)
2004	Main Hoon Na	General Amarjeet Bakshi
2005	Bewafaa	Ambarkant Verma
2005	Taj Mahal: An Eternal Love Story	Emperor Shah Jahan
2006	Do Raha	
2006	Jaanleva	Rakesh Khullar
2006	A All About Her	
2006	Take 3 Girls	Mo
2008	Showman	
2009	Blue	Captain Jagat Malhotra
2010	Kites	Bob Grover
2011	Yaara O Dildaara	Karam Singh Sandhu
2012	Aravaan	Tamil film
2012	Chakravyuh	Mahanta, an industrialist and negotiator for the government
2015	Dilwale	Dev Malik
2015	Anarkali	Jaffer Imam
2016	Teraa Surroor	Afzal A. Khan
2016	Mohenjo Daro	Maham
2017	Gautamiputra Satakarni	Nahapana
2017	Edict of Expulsion 1492	Sultan Bayezid
2017	Paisa Vasool	RAW Chief
2018	Jaane Kyun De Yaaron	Shera
2018	Saheb, Biwi Aur Gangster 3	Maharaja Hari Singh
2023	Shaakuntalam	Kashyapa Maharshi
2024	Berlin	Buraue Chief
2025	Aachari Baa	Brijesh Malhotra
2025	Hari Hara Veera Mallu	Shahjahan
2026	Koragajja	
2026	USA vs Raj	Doctor Raj Bothra

=== Television ===
TV show title	Release year	Status	Character
Sandokan	1976	European TV miniseries	Sandokan
La tigre è ancora viva: Sandokan alla riscossa!	1977	European TV film	Sandokan
Dynasty	1982 - 1986	TV series	Farouk Ahmed
General Hospital	1983	TV series	Rama
Knight Rider	1985	TV series	Vascone
On Wings of Eagles	1986	TV miniseries	Mohammed
One Life to Live	1986	TV series	Colonel Carlos Demitri
The Days and Nights of Molly Dodd	1987	TV series	Bill
Murder, She Wrote	1988	TV series	Vikram Singh
Magnum, P.I.	1988	TV series	Malcolm
The Mysteries of the Dark Jungle	1991	TV miniseries	Kammamuri
Desert Law	1991	TV miniseries	Moulet Beni-Zair
The Bold and the Beautiful	1994 - 1995, 2005	TV series	Prince Omar
Maharaja's Daughter	1994	TV miniseries	Chandragupta
Highlander: The Series	1995	TV series	Kamir
Bible Ki Kahaniya	1995	TV series	Abraham, the Patriarch
The Return of Sandokan	1996	TV miniseries	Sandokan
Noi siamo angeli a.k.a. We are Angels	1997	TV miniseries	Gen. Napoleon Durate
Forbidden Territory: Stanley's Search for Livingstone	1997	TV series	Khamis Bin Abdullah
Team Knight Rider	1998	TV series	Aristotle Drago
Vivere	2006	Italian TV series	Emir Ibrahim
Director's Cut	2007	TV special series	Himself
Un medico in famiglia 5	2007	Italian TV series	Kabir
Ganga Kii Dheej	2010–2011	Hindi TV series	Dada Bhai
Buddha	2013	Hindi TV series	Asita Muni (Cameo)
VandeMataram	2013	TV special news series	Himself
Guns & Glory: The Indian Soldier	2013	TV special news series	Himself
Jai Ho	2014	TV special news series	Himself
Thinkistan	2019	Web series	Danish Azeem
Tanaav	2024	Web series	Haider Farooqui
Life Hill Gayi	2024	web series	Dadaji

== Reality shows ==
Year	Show title	Role	Status	Sr.
2004	L'Isola Dei Famosi 2	Contestant	Runner-up	2
2021–2022	Grande Fratello VIP 6	Contestant	Evicted	15

== Radio ==
Radio title	Release year	Status	Character
Ch@t (Italian fiction)	2007	RAI Radio 2	Sandokan
'Women of Gold'	2012	RadioOne	Himself
'Men of Steel'	2012	Radio One	Himself
'Ten on Ten' – 'Ten Biggest Impacts This Last Decade'	2017	Radio One	Himself
'Best of 2017'	2017	Radio One	Himself

== Dubbing roles ==
=== Live action films ===
Film title	Actor	Character	Dub language	Original language	Original year release	Dub year release	Notes
Prince of Persia: The Sands of Time	Ben Kingsley	Nizam	Hindi	English	2010	2010	Performed alongside Yudhvir Dahiya who voiced Jake Gyllenhaal as Dastan and Joy Sengupta who voiced Toby Kebbell as Prince Garsiv in Hindi.
Fantastic Four	Reg E. Cathey	Dr. Franklin Storm	Hindi	English	2015	2015	Performed alongside Karan Trivedi who voiced Miles Teller as Reed Richards / Mister Fantastic in Hindi.

== Voiceovers in ads and commercials ==
Project	Type	Language	Year
The Keeper of the Flame – The History of TATA	Documentary	English	2007
An Introduction to CHILDLINE India	Public awareness campaign – narrator	English	2008
Aircel Save the Tiger Campaign	Public awareness campaign – narrator	English	2009
Ford Motors launch Figo, India	Live event	English	2010
Somnath Temple, Gujarat	Sound & light show	English	2010
Red Fort, New Delhi	Sound & light show	English	2011
Virasat-e-Khalsa – Khalsa Heritage Memorial Complex, Punjab	Narrator	English	2011
Apollo Tyres	Advertisement	English	2013
Jindal Panther	Advertisement	English	2014
Banda Singh Bahadur – War Memorial, Punjab	Sound & light show	English	2014
TAJ Hotels, Resorts & Palaces	Advertisement	English	2014
DHL	Advertisement	Hindi	2015
Yamaha	Advertisement	Hindi	2015
Mount of Excellence	Documentary narrator	English	2015
Parle	Advertisement	Hindi & English	2016
Tanishq	Advertisement	English	2016
Konark Sun Temple, Odisha	Sound & light show	English	2017

== Voting memberships ==
The Academy of Motion Picture Arts and Sciences
The Screen Actors Guild
The American Federation of Television and Radio Artists
The British Actors' Equity Association
