= Thunder Warrior III =

- Theatrical release poster by Studio Spataro
- Directed by: Fabrizio De Angelis
- Written by: Dardano Sacchetti; Fabrizio De Angelis
- Produced by: Fabrizio De Angelis
- Starring: Mark Gregory; Raimund Harmstorf
- Cinematography: Sergio D'Offizi; Federico Del Zoppo
- Edited by: Vincenzo Tomassi
- Music by: Francesco De Masi
- Release date: 1988
- Running time: 90 minutes
- Country: Italy
- Language: English

Thunder Warrior III (Italian: Thunder 3) is a 1988 Italian action film written and directed by Fabrizio De Angelis (credited as Larry Ludman). It is the sequel to the 1987 film Thunder Warrior II, and the last film in the Thunder film series.

== Premise ==
On an Indian reservation, the ex-military Magnum illegally sets up a training camp for mercenaries. After they destroy the Indian village, Thunder protests demanding justice from the authorities, but to no avail.

== Cast ==
- Mark Gregory as Thunder
- John Phillip Law as Sheriff Jeff
- Horst Schön as Bill
- Werner Pochath as Colonel Magnum
- Ingrid Lawrence as Sheena
- Jeffrey Domo as Little Owl
- Bruce Miles as Bernie
- Duke Smith

== Release ==
Thunder Warrior III was distributed on home video as Thunder Warrior 3 by American Imperial in the United Kingdom in August 1989.
