= Francesco De Masi =

Italian composer (1930–2005)

- Born: 11 January 1930; Rome, Italy
- Died: 6 November 2005 (aged 75); Rome, Italy
- Occupations: Conductor, film score composer

Francesco De Masi (11 January 1930 – 6 November 2005) was an Italian conductor and film score composer.

== Biography ==
He studied composition at the San Pietro a Maiella Conservatory in Naples under the guidance of Achille Longo, his uncle. De Masi became interested in film music when Longo was asked to compose a soundtrack for a film, and he asked De Masi to be his assistant. De Masi's filmography includes scores for over 200 films and TV series, ranging from Spaghetti Westerns and sword and sandal epics to gialli and horror films, such as Lucio Fulci's Lo squartatore di New York (The New York Ripper).

De Masi also scored several action films, such as Enzo G. Castellari's Quel maledetto treno blindato (The Inglorious Bastards), but he is best remembered for his work on Spaghetti Westerns. Unlike most other composers, De Masi started writing western scores slightly earlier than the genre's most influential musician, Ennio Morricone. As De Masi's music was less influenced by Morricone, his style had a distinctive sound. Many of his songs were performed by the low-voiced member of the I Cantori Moderni choir, Ettore "Raoul" Lovecchio.

De Masi was also very interested in classical music. He taught at the Santa Cecilia Conservatory, also conducting the conservatory's orchestra. In an interview, De Masi listed Palestrina, Karlheinz Stockhausen, Ravel and Shostakovich as his main classical influences.

De Masi died of cancer at the age of 75.

== Selected filmography ==
Year	Film	Directed by	Singles	Latest CD / Digital Release
1962	Kerim, Son of the Sheik	Mario Costa		Digitmovies / CDDM160 / 2010
1962	Toto vs. Maciste	Fernando Cerchio		Digitmovies / DGST027 / 2017
1962	The Carpet of Horror	Harald Reinl		Saimel / 3998956 / 2020
1962	Colossus of the Arena	Michele Lupo		
1962	Tiko and the Shark	Folco Quilici		Beat Records Company / BCM 9537 / 2014
1963	The Ghost	Riccardo Freda		Digitmovies / CDDM122 / 2008
1963	Hercules the Invincible	Alvaro Mancori, Lewis Mann		
1963	The Sign of the Coyote	Mario Caiano		
1963	Goliath and the Sins of Babylon	Michele Lupo		Digitmovies / CDDM234 / 2013
1964	Man of the Cursed Valley	Siro Marcellini, Primo Zeglio		Beat Records / CDCR149 / 2023
1964	Maciste in King Solomon's Mines	Piero Regnoli		Digitmovies / CDDM160 / 2010
1964	The Lion of Thebes	Giorgio Ferroni		
1964	Seven Slaves Against the World	Michele Lupo		
1964	La vendetta di Spartacus	Michele Lupo		
1964	Massacre at Marble City	Paul Martin (director)		
1965	Seven Rebel Gladiators	Michele Lupo		
1965	Mutiny in the South Seas	Wolfgang Becker		Beat Records / BCM9555 / 2015
1965	Serenade for Two Spies	Michael Pfleghar, Alberto Cardone		Beat Records / BCM 9552 / 2014
1965	Desperate Mission (1965 film)	Roberto Bianchi Montero		
1965	A Coffin for the Sheriff	Mario Caiano		Beat Records / CDCR 95 / 2011
1966	Seven Dollars on the Red	Alberto Cardone, Melchiade Coletti		Beat Records / CDCR121 / 2012
1966	The Murder Clinic	Elio Scardamaglia		Digitmovies / CDDM122 / 2008
1966	FBI Operation Yellow Viper	Alfredo Medori, Wolfgang Schleif		Beat Records / BCM 9546 / 2014
1966	An Angel for Satan	Camillo Mastrocinque		
1966	The Third Eye	Mino Guerrini		
1966	Ringo, the Mark of Vengeance	Mario Caiano		GDM / GDM 2060 / 2005
1966	Arizona Colt	Michele Lupo		Beat Records / CDCR 96 / 2012
1966	Alla scoperta dell'Africa (TV Movie)	Folco Quilici		Beat Records / BCM 9547 / 2015
1966	India (TV Movie)	Folco Quilici		Cometa Edizioni Musicali / CMT 10028-10029 / 2012
1967	Two Crosses at Danger Pass	Rafael Romero Marchent		
1967	Seven Pistols for a Massacre	Mario Caiano		
1967	Any Gun Can Play	Enzo G. Castellari		Beat Records / CDCR 91 / 2011
1967	Your Turn to Die	Michele Lupo		Digitmovies / CDDM024 / 2004
1968	Johnny Hamlet	Enzo G. Castellari		
1968	Seven Winchesters for a Massacre	Enzo G. Castellari		
1968	The Moment to Kill	Giuliano Carmineo		
1968	A Taste of Death	Sergio Merolle		
1968	Kill Them All and Come Back Alone	Enzo G. Castellari		Beat Records / CDCR 92 / 2011
1969	Lesbo	Edoardo Mulargia		Beat Records / CDCR 99 / 2010
1969	Eagles Over London	Enzo G. Castellari	Ariete / AR 8008: La Battaglia D'Inghilterra / Tema Di Meg	Beat Records / CDCR 62 / 2002
1970	Una storia d'amore (1969 film)	Michele Lupo		Beat Records / BCM 9553 / 2015
1970	Sartana's Here… Trade Your Pistol for a Coffin	Giuliano Carnimeo		
1970	The Weekend Murders	Michele Lupo		Beat Records / BCM9512 / 2013
1971	Terrible Day of the Big Gundown	Sergio Garrone		
1971	FBI Operation Pakistan	Harald Reinl		Beat Records / BCM9542 / 2015
1971	African Story	Marino Girolami		Digitmovies / CDDM169 / 2010
1972	The Weapon, the Hour & the Motive	Francesco Mazzei		
1972	Crime Boss (film)	Alberto De Martino		Beat Records / CDCR 139 / 2018
1972	The House of the Doves	Claudio Guerin		
1972	Hector the Mighty	Enzo G. Castellari		Beat Records / CDCR 111 / 2011
1973	The Big Game (1973 film)	Robert Day		Chris' Soundtrack Corner / CSC001 / 2007
1973	The Hanging Woman	José Luis Merino		
1973	Bawdy Tales	Sergio Citti		
1974	The Arena	Steve Carver, Michael Wotruba		Digitmovies / CDDM160 / 2010
1975	Private Vices, Public Virtues	Miklós Jancsó		
1977	Nazi Love Camp 27	Mario Caiano		
1977	Weapons of Death	Mario Caiano		Beat Records / CDCR 83 / 2007
1977	Kid Vengeance	Joseph Manduke		
1978	The Inglorious Bastards	Enzo G. Castellari		
1980	The European Man	Folco Quilici		Kronos Records / KRONGOLD038 / 2020
1982	The New York Ripper	Lucio Fulci		Beat Records / CDCR154 / 2024
1982	Invaders of the Lost Gold	Alan Birkinshaw		
1983	Rush (1983 film)	Tonino Ricci		
1983	Thor the Conqueror	Tonino Ricci		
1983	Lone Wolf McQuade	Steve Carver		Beat Records / CDCR 26 / 1995
1983	Escape from the Bronx	Enzo G. Castellari		Beat Records / CDCR146 / 2021
1983	Thunder Warrior	Fabrizio De Angelis		Beat Records / CDCR 87 / 2008
1984	Mad Dog	Fabrizio De Angelis		Kronos Records / KRONCD009 / 2012
1985	Formula for a Murder	Alberto De Martino		Beat Records / CDCR 29 / 1996
1986	Operation Nam	Fabrizio De Angelis		
1988	Thunder Warrior III	Fabrizio De Angelis		Beat Records / CDCR 87 / 2008
1989	Mortacci (Death to You)	Sergio Citti		
