= Man Hunt (1985 film) =

1985 film

- DVD cover
- Directed by: Fabrizio De Angelis
- Written by: Fabrizio De Angelis; Dardano Sacchetti (story)
- Produced by: Fabrizio De Angelis
- Starring: Ethan Wayne; Henry Silva; Bo Svenson; Ernest Borgnine; Raimund Harmstorf
- Cinematography: Guglielmo Mancori
- Edited by: Vincenzo Tomassi
- Music by: Francesco De Masi
- Distributed by: The Samuel Goldwyn Company (United States, 1984)
- Release date: 1985
- Running time: 91 minutes
- Country: Italy
- Language: English

Man Hunt (original title: Cane arrabbiato) is a 1985 Western drama film directed by Fabrizio De Angelis and starring Ethan Wayne, Henry Silva, Bo Svenson, and Ernest Borgnine.

== Plot ==
"When You Have Been Wrongly Jailed, The Only Thing On Your Mind Is Justice."

Wayne plays a nameless cowboy in modern-day Arizona who buys two horses at a fair but who is then arrested for theft because he failed to get the papers which would prove his ownership. He's sentenced to prison but escapes and begins a desperate search to find the man who sold him the horses.

== Cast ==
- Ethan Wayne as Stranger
- Raimund Harmstorf as Guard
- Henry Silva as Prison Boss
- Bo Svenson as Sheriff
- Ernest Borgnine as Ben Robeson
- Terry Lynch as Robeson's Daughter
