= Operation Nam =

- Canadian VHS promotional poster
- Italian: Cobra Mission
- Directed by: Fabrizio De Angelis
- Written by: Vincenzo Mannino; Gianfranco Clerici; Erwin C. Dietrich; Fabrizio De Angelis
- Produced by: Erwin C. Dietrich; Fabrizio De Angelis
- Starring: Oliver Tobias; Christopher Connelly; Manfred Lehmann; John Steiner; Ethan Wayne; Gordon Mitchell; Donald Pleasence
- Cinematography: Sergio Salvati; Sergio d'Offizi
- Edited by: Alberto Moriani; Eugenio Alabiso
- Music by: Francesco de Masi
- Production companies: Fulvia International Film; Ascot Film
- Release dates: 31 July 1986 (West Germany); 14 August 1986 (Italy)
- Running time: 89 minutes
- Countries: Italy; West Germany

Operation Nam (Italian: Cobra Mission) is a 1986 Euro War film co-written, produced, and directed by Fabrizio De Angelis (credited as 'Larry Ludman'). It stars Oliver Tobias, Christopher Connelly, Manfred Lehmann, John Steiner, Ethan Wayne, Gordon Mitchell and Donald Pleasence.

== Plot ==
Ten years after the end of the Vietnam War, three American veterans who have never resigned themselves to defeat decided to organize a mission to return to Indochina. Their goal is to liberate the "missing in action", i.e. all those fellow soldiers taken prisoner by the Viet Cong and never let go.

== Cast ==
- Oliver Tobias as Richard Wagner
- Christopher Connelly as Roger Carson
- Manfred Lehmann as Mark Adams
- John Steiner as James Walcott
- Ethan Wayne as Mike
- Donald Pleasence as Father Lenoir
- Gordon Mitchell as Col. Mortimer
- Luciano Pigozzi as Mr. Lawson
- Enzo G. Castellari as Maj. Morris
- Thomas Moore as US Embassy Officer

== Production ==
The film was an international co-production between Italy's Fulvia International Film and West Germany's Ascot Film. Shooting took place on-location in the Philippines and Scottsdale, Arizona, and at De Paolis Studios in Rome.

== Release ==
Operation Nam was released in West Germany as Die Rückkehr der Wildgänse (lit. "The Return of the Wild Geese") on July 31, 1986. It was later released in Italy on August 14, 1986 in Milan, Florence, and Naples as Cobra Mission.

== Sequel ==
The film had a sequel, Cobra Mission 2, released in 1988.
