= Escape 2000 =

Escape 2000 may refer to:

- Turkey Shoot (1982 film), Australian film released in the U.S. as Escape 2000
- Escape from the Bronx, a 1983 Italian film released as Escape 2000
- 708 - Escape 2000, an episode of Mystery Science Theater 3000 featuring the Italian film
