= Thunder Warrior =

1983 Italian action film

- Theatrical release poster by Enzo Sciotti.
- Directed by: Fabrizio De Angelis
- Written by: Dardano Sacchetti; Fabrizio De Angelis
- Produced by: Fabrizio De Angelis
- Starring: Mark Gregory; Valeria Cavalli
- Cinematography: Sergio Salvati
- Music by: Francesco De Masi
- Release date: 1983
- Country: Italy
- Language: English

Thunder Warrior (Italian: Thunder, also known as Drug Traffikers) is a 1983 Italian action film written and directed by Fabrizio De Angelis (credited as Larry Ludman). It had two sequels; one released in 1987 and the other in 1988. The premise borrows heavily from First Blood.

== Premise ==
A Native American named Thunder returns home following a long absence and discovers a construction company that is destroying a native burial ground, which is a breach of the treaty signed a century ago between his grandfather with the US Government. His attempt to alert the local authorities results in him being escorted out of the county by one of the sheriff's deputies, who order him to stay out of town. Having done no wrong and after being assaulted by the construction workers, Thunder returns and the situation continues to escalate. Leading into a war between the lone native warrior and the entire sheriff department.

== Cast ==
- Mark Gregory as Thunder
- Valeria Cavalli as Sheela
- Raimund Harmstorf as Rusty
- Bo Svenson as The Sheriff
- Antonio Sabàto as Thomas
- Paolo Malco as Brian Sherman
- Bruno Corazzari as Frank
- Nazzareno Zamperla as Thomas's Friend
- Slim Smith as Grandfather to Thunder

== Production ==
Parts of the film were shot in Monument Valley, Utah.
