= Karate Warrior =

- Theatrical release poster
- Directed by: Fabrizio De Angelis as Larry Ludman
- Written by: Fabrizio De Angelis, Dardano Sacchetti
- Produced by: Fabrizio De Angelis
- Starring: Kim Rossi Stuart
- Cinematography: Giuseppe Pinori
- Edited by: Alberto Moriani
- Music by: Simon Boswell
- Distributed by: Fulvia Film
- Release date: 3 April 1987 (Italy)
- Running time: 94 minutes
- Country: Italy
- Language: Italian

Karate Warrior, also known as Fist of Power or The Boy in the Golden Kimono (Italian: Il ragazzo dal kimono d'oro) is a 1987 Italian martial arts drama film directed by Fabrizio De Angelis as Larry Ludman. The film became the first in a series, spawning five sequels.

== Synopsis ==
A young man visiting his father in the Philippines. He inadvertently interferes with the affairs of local gang run by Quino he gets beaten up and left for dead. An old monk nurses Anthony back to health and teaches him the ways of martial arts and even teaches a special technique known as the “Stroke of the Dragon”. Now the young man is determined to defeat Quino and get even for his beating.

== Cast ==
- Kim Rossi Stuart as Anthony Scott
- Ken Watanabe as Master Kimura
- Jannelle Barretto as Maria
- Jared Martin as Paul Scott
- Janet Agren as Julia Scott
- Enrico Torralba as Quino
- Jonny Tuazon
- Rudy Meyer
- Rico Orbita
- Arnulfo C. Quiwa

== Release ==
The film was released in Italy on September 3, 1987.

== Sequels ==
- Karate Warrior 2 (1988)
- Karate Warrior 3 (1991)
- Karate Warrior 4 (1992)
- Karate Warrior 5 (1992)
- Karate Warrior 6 (1993)
