= Semesterferien (TV series) =

- Created by: Carl Darrow; Hans-Peter Renfranz
- Starring: Gerhart Lippert; Anne Stegmann; Raimund Harmstorf
- Country of origin: West Germany
- No. of seasons: 1
- No. of episodes: 13

Production
- Running time: 25 minutes

Original release
- Network: ZDF
- Release: 25 January – 19 April 1972

Semesterferien (literal English translation: 'semester break'), is a 1972 West German television series, originally broadcast on ZDF. It consisted of thirteen episodes which were directed by Ernst Hofbauer, who had previously directed twenty-six episodes of Percy Stuart. Cinematography was by Helmut Bahr and Holger Wenck, while Rolf Bauer contributed the score, including the opening theme.

== Plot synopsis ==
Chris Schulz is a German professor for archaeology in the 1970s who in particular lectures on the Unetice culture, frequently quoting from his own book concerning the “Adlerberg-Kultur” (Adlerberg group). His theories are strongly opposed by his superiors Prof. Wienert and Prof. Hubschmied (Friedrich Schoenfelder), who consider them unfounded, and blame him for endangering the university's scientific reputation. When at the end of a semester they urge him to refrain from continuing to teach his theories, he bets them his job that he will present evidence after the semester break. Based on his firm belief that proof can easily be obtained by digging at certain places he had pointed out in his very book, he starts a journey in a Jeep which will lead him through Bavaria, Austria and Eastern Europe. He is accompanied by the university's sceptical assistant Ellen Anne Stegmann, and picks up the hitch-hiking muscular vagabond Paul (Raimund Harmstorf) along the way. Together they become entangled in a variety of adventures and finally arrive at the Black Sea empty-handed, where they are confronted by German tomb robbers who have unfinished business with Paul.

== Background ==
Brigitte Mira has several cameos as “Professor Kaiser”.
