= The New Barbarians =

1983 film by Enzo G. Castellari

- Italian theatrical release poster
- Directed by: Enzo G. Castellari
- Screenplay by: Tito Carpi; Enzo G. Castellari
- Story by: Tito Carpi
- Produced by: Fabrizio De Angelis
- Starring: Timothy Brent; Fred Williamson; George Eastman; Anna Kanakis; Thomas Moore
- Cinematography: Fausto Zuccoli
- Edited by: Gianfranco Amicucci
- Music by: Claudio Simonetti
- Production company: Deaf International Film
- Distributed by: Titanus
- Release date: 7 April 1983
- Running time: 91 minutes
- Country: Italy
- Language: Italian

The New Barbarians (Italian: I nuovi barbari; also known as Warriors of the Wasteland) is a 1983 Italian post-apocalyptic action film directed by Enzo G. Castellari, written by Castellari and Tito Carpi, and starring Giancarlo Prete and George Eastman. The plot takes place in 2019, following a nuclear holocaust, where two loners among the remains of the starving human race protect a group of pilgrims from a vicious gang bent on genocide.

== Plot ==
In the year 2019, after a nuclear war, humanity is reduced to a few starving groups. A ruthless gang called "The Templars" constantly raid settlers in an attempt to exterminate everyone in order to purge the Earth. A former Templar, Scorpion, along with his allies, prevents a small band of religious colonists from being massacred by the Templars.

== Cast ==
- Giancarlo Prete (as Timothy Brent) as Scorpion
- Fred Williamson as Nadir
- George Eastman as One
- Anna Kanakis as Alma
- Ennio Girolami (as Thomas Moore) as Shadow
- Venantino Venantini as Father Moses
- Massimo Vanni as Mako
- Giovanni Frezza as Young Mechanic
- Iris Peynado as Vinya
- Andrea Coppola as Mako's Friend
- Zora Kerova as Moses' Woman

== Production ==
The New Barbarians was shot outside of Rome in late 1982. When discussing 1990: The Bronx Warriors, The New Barbarians and Escape from the Bronx, Castellari stated the three films were written, prepared and filmed in six months.

For the stunts in the film, Castellari stated that he filmed each scene at three different speeds: 24fps, 55 and 96. Castellari stated that this allowed him to "edit the whole sequence in a more interesting way. It gives much more impact to the entire stunt and it actually looks much more impressive and powerful than it actually is."

== Release ==
The New Barbarians was released in Italy on 7 April 1983. It was released in the United States in January 1984 under the title of Warriors of the Wasteland. It was distributed by New Line Cinema.

== Reception ==
Castellari had positive recollections of making the film, stating that it "was an extremely cheap movie. The budget was incredibly small but I'm quite proud that I succeeded in making a movie shot on the outskirts of Rome." Variety found the film derivative of Mad Max 2 as well as having elements of Hal Needham's Megaforce and other films. Variety felt that Casterllari made a mistake in using slow motion opposed to George Miller's exciting high-speed action scenes, finding that the films car chases "look to be occurring at 25 mph". In Phil Hardy's book Science Fiction (1984), a review found the film to be too derivative of Mad Max 2. The Monthly Film Bulletin described the film as a "shamelessly watered-down, warmed-over" version of Mad Max 2.

In a retrospective review, AllMovie awarded the film two stars out of five, found that the film, while "capturing the true spirit of the low budget rip-off flicks from [the] early '80s, The New Barbarians is neither smart nor original, but a riot for anyone who gets off on Mad Max and all of its junky followers."
