= Who Breaks... Pays =

- Directed by: Giorgio Ferroni
- Screenplay by: Roberto Natale; Vittorio Vighi
- Story by: Francesco Merli
- Produced by: Turgut Demirağ
- Starring: Giancarlo Prete; Brad Harris
- Cinematography: Sandro Mancori
- Edited by: Franco Fraticelli
- Music by: Sergio Montori
- Production company: AND Film
- Release date: 1975
- Countries: Italy, Turkish
- Languages: Italian, Turkish

Who Breaks... Pays (Italian: Antonio e Placido - Attenti ragazzi... chi rompe paga!) is a 1975 Italian-Turkish comedy film directed by Giorgio Ferroni and starring Giancarlo Prete and Brad Harris.

== Plot ==
On the docks of Istanbul, two buddies, Antonio (Prete) and Placid (Harris) encounter an intimidating arms smuggler and his goons.

== Cast ==
- Giancarlo Prete as Antonio
- Brad Harris as Placido
- Gianni Rizzo as Paul
- Lars Bloch as Captain McConny
- Giovanni Cianfriglia as Brusio
- Birtane Gungor as Flower
- Muzaffer Tema

== See also ==
- List of Italian films of 1975
