= Zombi 2 =

1979 film directed by Lucio Fulci

- Italian theatrical release poster
- Directed by: Lucio Fulci
- Written by: Elisa Briganti
- Produced by: Ugo Tucci; Fabrizio De Angelis
- Starring: Tisa Farrow; Ian McCulloch; Richard Johnson; Al Cliver; Auretta Gay; Stefania D'Amario; Olga Karlatos
- Cinematography: Sergio Salvati
- Edited by: Vincenzo Tomassi
- Music by: Fabio Frizzi; Giorgio Tucci
- Production company: Variety Film
- Distributed by: Variety Distribution
- Release date: 25 August 1979 (Rome)
- Running time: 91 minutes
- Country: Italy
- Language: English
- Budget: ₤410 million
- Box office: ₤3 billion $1,925,000

Zombi 2 is a 1979 English-language Italian zombie film directed by Lucio Fulci. It was adapted from an original screenplay by Dardano Sacchetti to serve as a sequel to George A. Romero's Dawn of the Dead (1978), which was released in Italy under the title Zombi. The film was released as Zombie in the USA and Zombie Flesh-Eaters in the UK. It stars Tisa Farrow, Ian McCulloch, and Richard Johnson, and features a score by frequent Fulci collaborator Fabio Frizzi.

The film is set on a Caribbean island cursed by voodoo whose dead residents rise as zombies to attack the living. A scientist's daughter journeys to the island after her father's boat turns up abandoned in NYC. Intended by its writer as a return to "classic zombie tales", Zombi 2 was filmed in Italy, with further location shooting in NYC and Santo Domingo.

Produced on a small budget of 410 million Italian lira, the film recouped several times its production costs at the international box office. It attracted controversy upon its release in the UK, where it became listed as a "video nasty". However, in the subsequent years, the film received a greater appreciation from critics and gained a cult following.

== Plot ==
In a cold open, a shrouded corpse reanimates, and is shot in the head by a silhouetted man. The man then tells his colleague “The boat can leave now, tell the crew.”

Some time later, an abandoned boat drifts into New York Harbor, and is boarded by two harbor patrolmen. A hidden zombie kills one of the patrolmen, but is shot by the patrolman's partner and falls overboard; the dead patrolman's body is taken to the morgue. Anne Bowles (Tisa Farrow) is questioned by the police, as the boat belonged to her father. She claims he is conducting research on Matool, a Caribbean island. British journalist Peter West (Ian McCulloch) is investigating the story; he and Bowles learn that Bowles' father was suffering from a strange illness on the island. They hire a boat and two guides—Brian Hull and his girlfriend, Susan Barrett—to reach Matool.

Meanwhile, on Matool, British doctor David Menard and his wife Paola have been researching the phenomenon of zombie reanimation. Paola wishes to flee the island, but Menard insists on staying. That night, Paola is alone in the house when a zombie tries to enter; she pushes the door shut, but it breaks through with one arm. Paola is dragged through the hole and killed, with her eye being gouged out by splintered wood.

Approaching Matool, Barrett dives into the ocean around the boat. She encounters a shark and flees behind a reef only to be accosted by a submerged zombie. Surfacing, she reaches the boat while the shark and zombie attack each other. Eventually, the boat docks at Matool.

Menard is alarmed to find that one of his colleagues, Fritz, has died of the zombie infection and tells his remaining staff to shoot all the dead bodies in the head. While digging a grave for a body, he hears a signal flare and follows it to discover the boat group. Menard sends them back to his mansion to fetch his wife, where they discover Paola's corpse being eaten by zombies. The group fends off an attack against them and escapes in a jeep, with West suffering an ankle injury when the vehicle veers off-road after slamming into a zombie. Resting in a jungle clearing, the group realizes they have stumbled upon a graveyard; Barrett is killed when one of the corpses rises from the earth and bites out her throat.

As more corpses reanimate, the group flees to the local hospital, where Menard explains that the dead are rising as a result of a voodoo curse that he has been trying to stop. The hospital is besieged by zombies, and Menard is killed by a reanimated Fritz. As the zombies attempt to enter, those being treated for infection inside the hospital also reanimate, killing several hospital staff who have stayed behind. As the dead outside breach the door, Bowles, West, and Hull set the building on fire and start to shoot the zombies; the undead Barrett bites Hull in the arm but is shot by West. Bowles, West, and Hull escape to the boat and leave the island. At sea, Hull dies of his infection, and his body is locked in a cabin to be used as evidence of what has happened. However, as the boat approaches New York again, a radio broadcast reports that the city is under attack from zombies—the result of the initial attack in the harbor.

At the Brooklyn Bridge, a horde of zombies walk slowly towards the city.

== Cast ==
Credits taken from the British Film Institute and Cinema Italiano: the Complete Guide from Classics to Cult.

- Tisa Farrow as Anne Bolt ('Anne Bowles' in the English dub)
- Ian McCulloch as Peter West
- Richard Johnson as Dr. David Menard
- Al Cliver as Brian Hull
- Auretta Gay as Susan Barrett
- Olga Karlatos as Paola Menard

Director Lucio Fulci makes a cameo appearance as Peter's news editor.

== Production ==
=== Pre-production ===
[Zombi 2] did not have the greatest of scripts, but Richard [gave] every scene authority and colour. In the sequence where he was driving me in a Land Rover, he extemporized in such a lyrical and poetic fashion that it reminded me of my days with the RSC.

— Ian McCulloch on his co-star Richard Johnson

Zombi 2 serves as an unofficial sequel to Zombi, a re-edited European release of George A. Romero's 1978 film Dawn of the Dead. Zombi had been edited by Dario Argento and given a new score by the Italian band Goblin, and proved successful upon its release in Italy. As Italian copyright law allows any film to be marketed as a sequel to another work, the film was quickly greenlit and financed by producer Fabrizio De Angelis. Enzo G. Castellari was offered to direct Zombi 2, but turned it down as he did not feel he would be the right director for a horror film. Director Lucio Fulci was De Angelis' second choice for the project, and was hired based on his handling of violent scenes in his previous films Sette note in nero and Don't Torture a Duckling. Fulci claimed not to know the film's title, including 2 as a way to tie in with Dawn, and was very displeased with his inability to protest the film's distribution.

Screenwriter Dardano Sacchetti had already worked with Fulci on Sette note in nero. Sacchetti has since stated that his initial script for Zombi 2—originally written under the title Nightmare Island—had been influenced by The Island of Doctor Moreau and had been intended to return to "classic zombie tales", such as I Walked with a Zombie, The Walking Dead or Voodoo Island. Sacchetti began work on this script in July 1978, before it was optioned by Angelis' company Variety Films that December and re-tooled as Zombi 2. Lead star McCulloch was cast primarily on the success in Italy of the 1975 BBC television series Survivors, which had impressed producer Ugo Tucci.

=== Filming ===
Production occurred during June and July 1979 in Latina, as well as in NYC and Santo Domingo. Several of the actors' contracts had specified being provided with trailers for the duration of production. However, none were present when filming started, and only Johnson was able to convince the producers to provide one. McCulloch and Johnson had known each other for many years by the time they collaborated on Zombi 2, having first met while they were members of the RSC in 1962, with the younger McCulloch coming to idolise Johnson's work. The shark attack scene was devised by Ugo Tucci, and was shot without Fulci's approval, by Giannetto De Rossi, in Isla Mujeres, with the zombie portrayed by a local shark trainer.

The film was one of several Italian exploitation films starring Richard Johnson in the 1970s.

== Soundtrack ==
"Lucio was an important director in my career and also a friend, a person for whom I had strong feelings".

— Composer Fabio Frizzi on collaborating with Fulci

The score to Zombi 2 was composed by Fabio Frizzi, who frequently scored Fulci's works, including Sette note in nero, I quattro dell'apocalisse and Sella d'argento previously. Zombi 2 marked the first time the two had worked together on a straight horror movie as opposed to their previous spaghetti Western and giallo work. Frizzi would go on to compose music for many more horror films, both with and without Fulci.

Frizzi's work on Zombi 2—particularly "Seq. 6", the sequence composed for the eye-gouging scene—was inspired by the melody of the Beatles' 1967 song "A Day in the Life". Elsewhere in the score, Frizzi included Caribbean musical cues, which he noted were intended to "pleasantly deceive" the audience. A medley of the score was later included as part of Frizzi's 2013 Fulci 2 Frizzi live tour, including the 2014 live album release Fulci 2 Frizzi: Live at Union Chapel. The score itself was released on vinyl by Death Waltz Records in 2015, with new artwork by Tom Beauvais.

=== Track listing ===
All tracks are written by Fabio Frizzi.

Side one
No.	Title	Length
1.	"Sequence 1"	3:57
2.	"Sequence 2"	3:09
3.	"Sequence 3"	2:32
4.	"Sequence 4"	2:31

Side two
No.	Title	Length
1.	"Sequence 5"	1:20
2.	"Sequence 6"	3:01
3.	"Sequence 7"	3:06
4.	"Sequence 8"	2:59

== Release ==
Zombi 2 was first released on 25 August 1979 in Rome with a running time of 94 minutes, before being released in English-speaking markets in 1980. The film would go on to gross over ₤3,000,000,000 worldwide, significantly higher than its ₤410,000,000 budget. Zombi 2 was distributed theatrically in the UK by Miracle Films as Zombie Flesh-Eaters and in the USA by the Jerry Gross Organization as Zombie. It was released on home video with the English-language titles Zombie 2 in the Netherlands.

Upon its release in the UK on 2 January 1980, the BBFC required a total of 1 minute and 46 seconds of material to be cut in order to obtain an X rating; its most recent home release on 1 August 2005 passed for an 18 rating with no cuts required. However, the 1980 release found itself classified as a "video nasty", having been considered a breach of the Obscene Publications Act. This classification, and the de facto "ban" it involved, has subsequently been used for publicity when advertising future home video releases.

== Home media ==
Zombi 2 has been released several times on home video, beginning with a 1981 VHS version by VIPCO (Video Instant Picture Company) following the theatrical cuts directed by the BBFC. VIPCO produced an uncut release, marketed as the "strong uncut version", on VHS the following year. This is the release which was widely confiscated as a "video nasty". Further VHS releases followed in 1991 and 1994, with the latter being edited for widescreen viewing. The film was first released on DVD by VIPCO in 2004 with minor cuts, and uncut by Anchor Bay Entertainment in 2005. Other DVD releases include a 2004 version by Cornerstone Media, and a 2012 DVD and Blu-ray combination version by Arrow Films. A 4K Ultra HD version was later issued by Blue Underground in 2020

== Reception ==
Zombi 2 grossed higher in the domestic Italian box office than its predecessor, leading to an official sequel; Fulci began directing Zombi 3 before illness forced him to hand over the reins to Bruno Mattei and Claudio Fragasso, the latter of whom would also direct After Death, which would later be rereleased/marketed as Zombi 4: After Death, as an unofficial sequel to Zombi 3. Zombi 2 was nominated for the Saturn Award for Best Make-up at the 8th Saturn Awards in 1981.

In a contemporary review, Tom Milne reviewed an 89-minute English-language dub in the Monthly Film Bulletin and compared the film to Dawn of the Dead. While noting that the cast was competent and the film featured "sometimes effective make-up work", Milne opined that the film "lacks—for all weaknesses of Romero's film—even a tenth of the minatory charge harboured by Zombies." The review noted that the censorship trimmed a "promisingly gruesome sequence" with a corpse undergoing an autopsy. In Italy, La Stampa described the film as "pedestrian", as well finding it hard to bear Olga Karlatos' character's death scene.

In a 2012 review for The Guardian, Phelim O'Neill described the film as "the ultimate undead movie", praising its commitment to gory scenes and convincing effects. O'Neill felt that the film stood the passage of time well, and explained that this was "because it delivers, plain and simple". He also highlighted Frizzi's work on the score, and summed the film up as "a real influence on what followed". Anne Billson, writing for The Daily Telegraph in 2013, included Zombi 2 in her list of the top ten zombie films, describing its opening scenes as "sublimely creepy" and the eye-gouging scene as "memorably nasty". Writing for the Daily Mirror, James Kloda praised Fulci's directing, finding that he consistently made evocative use of particular shots to accentuate the film's action or horror. Kloda felt that the film "can often blind with its shock violence but is well worth the look".

Writing for AllMovie, Robert Firsching described Zombi 2 as a "relatively well-made shocker" which "led to the zombie-gore film becoming the dominant motif of 1980s Italian horror". Firsching rated the film three stars out of five. Empire's Kim Newman awarded the film two stars out of five, chalking up much of its "video nasty" reputation to the "eye gouging" scene, comparing this unfavourably to similar material in 1929's Un Chien Andalou. Newman did compliment several sequences as interesting, particularly one underwater scene depicting a zombie attacking a shark, but found that overall the film did not "keep up the pace or plausibility sufficiently".

According to Simone Brioni, Zombi 2 (1979) can be interpreted through a postcolonial and psychoanalytic lens as expressing anxieties rooted in Italy’s colonial past. Brioni argues that the film’s colonial overtones evoke a collective unconscious fear of African immigration, metaphorically “resurrecting” suppressed memories of Italian colonial violence in Africa. He further suggests that xenophobic political discourse has appropriated horror imagery—particularly that of zombie films—to stigmatize immigrants.

On review aggregator website Rotten Tomatoes, the film holds an approval rating of 42% based on 26 reviews, with a weighted average rating of 5.30/10. Its consensus reads "Zombi 2 is an absurdly graphic zombie movie legendary for some gory scenes and nothing in between". On Metacritic, the film has a score of 54 out of 100 based on reviews from 8 critics, indicating "mixed or average reviews".

== Legacy ==
Despite being shown as a knock off fake sequel to Dawn of the Dead, Zombie (Zombi 2) has developed a cult following, becoming well known for the underwater zombie vs shark scene and the eyeball death scene.

Dead Island and Dead Island: Riptide that were released in 2011 and 2013 take inspiration from Zombie (Zombi 2), as both games are about a group of people trying to escape a zombie outbreak on a tropical island.

The success of Zombi 2 led to an official sequel, Zombi 3, directed by Lucio Fulci, co-directed by Bruno Mattei, with second unit work by Claudio Fragrasso. Fragrasso co-wrote Zombi 3's screenplay with his wife, Rossella Drudi, who went uncredited. A string of unofficial sequels in the Zombi film series, including Zombi 4: After Death and Zombi 5: Killing Birds were also released. The success of Zombi 2 led to a series of horror films being rereleased as "Zombi" movies, despite having no connection to Zombi 2.

== See also ==
- List of cult films
- Zombi (film series)

== Bibliography ==
- Albiero, Paolo; Cacciatore, Giacomo (2004). Arriva il "poète du macabre", ovvero: Zombi 2 (1979), in Il terrorista dei generi. Tutto il cinema di Lucio Fulci (in Italian). Un mondo a parte. ISBN 88-900629-6-7.
- Brioni, Simone (2013). 'Zombies and the Post-colonial Italian Unconscious: Lucio Fulci's Zombi 2 (1979)'. Cinergie.
- Curti, Roberto (2013). Italian Crime Filmography, 1968-1980. McFarland. ISBN 978-0786469765.
- Hubner, Laura; Leaning, Marcus; Manning, Paul (2014). The Zombie Renaissance in Popular Culture. Palgrave Macmillan. ISBN 978-1137276506.
- Petley, Julian (2011). Film and Video Censorship in Contemporary Britain. Edinburgh University Press. ISBN 978-0748625390.
- Pulliam, Michele; Fonseca, Anthony J. (2014). Encyclopedia of the Zombie: The Walking Dead in Popular Culture and Myth. ABC-CLIO. ISBN 978-1440803895.
- Frizzi 2 Fulci: Live at Union Chapel (Media notes). Fabio Frizzi. Beat Records. 2014.
- Thrower, Stephen; Waddell, Calum; Karlatos, Olga; Lapper, Craig; Slater, Jay (2012). Zombie Flesh Eaters (Media notes). Arrow Films.
- Thrower, Stephen (2018) [May 1999]. Beyond Terror: The Films of Lucio Fulci (Revised & Expanded Second ed.). England, United Kingdom: Fab Press (published February 2018). ISBN 978-1-903254-90-5.
