= Escape from the Bronx =

- Theatrical release poster by Enzo Sciotti
- Directed by: Enzo G. Castellari
- Screenplay by: Tito Carpi; Enzo G. Castellari
- Story by: Tito Carpi
- Produced by: Fabrizio De Angelis
- Starring: Mark Gregory; Timothy Brent; Valeria D'Obici; Henry Silva
- Cinematography: Blasco Giurato
- Edited by: Gianfranco Amicucci
- Music by: Francesco de Masi
- Production company: Fulvia Film
- Distributed by: Fulvia Film
- Release dates: August 15, 1983 (Italy); January 18, 1985 (United States)
- Running time: 89 minutes
- Country: Italy

Escape from the Bronx (Italian: Fuga dal Bronx), also known as Bronx Warriors 2 in the United Kingdom and Escape 2000, is a 1983 Italian action film directed by Enzo G. Castellari. It was featured on Mystery Science Theater 3000 under its Escape 2000 name. It is a sequel to 1990: The Bronx Warriors.

== Plot ==
Several years after the events of 1990: The Bronx Warriors, Trash, former leader of the Riders gang, is now a cynical loner in the impoverished, lawless wasteland of the Bronx and trading in stolen ammunition.

The General Construction (GC) Corporation, led by President Clark, wishes to tear down the Bronx to turn it into “the city of the future.” To do so, they need to clear the current population from the area and have employed former prison warden Floyd Wangler and a private battalion of "Disinfestors" to burn, shoot, and gas those who will not leave willingly.

While the bums, vagrants, and elderly are easy prey, the remaining warrior gangs of the Bronx will not go quietly. A rebel army of all surviving Bronx gangs, led by Doblòn, is literally holed up underground.

When Trash's parents are burned alive by Disinfestors, he takes revenge by leading ruthless guerrilla attacks on the clean-up squads. The GC Corporation and Wangler retaliate with nastier means of attacking the rebellion (such as rigging hostages with bombs). Wangler calls all the squads' leaders and orders them to find and kill Trash, as he fears the underground gangs could recognize the courageous Trash as a new, charismatic leader.

Trash, Doblòn, and a crusading reporter named Moon Gray team up with psychotic mercenary Crazy Strike and his equally crazy son Junior. Together, they plan to kidnap President Clark and use him as a bargaining chip to put the Bronx back in the hands of the gangs.

Strike, Trash, and Moon move to the surface in order to carry out the kidnapping of Clark, who is about to attend a propaganda ceremony in the Bronx. As the three adults go up, Junior remains down below to cover their subsequent escape with explosives. When on the surface, the trio realize that the area is controlled by a security force. Moon stages a diversion by suddenly appearing during the governor's speech and denouncing Clark and the governor, accusing them of lying. In response, one of the governor's men kills Moon and places a gun on her to stage a self-defense action.

Chaos and confusion break out in the area. President Clark tries to use an old wooden door as shelter, but discovers that Trash is behind the door as well. In the midst of the confusion, Trash abducts Clark while Crazy Strike covers their escape with the use of explosives and hand-bombs. Trash, Clark, and Strike go back to a collector that gives them safe passage into the underground area; their escape is further helped by explosives set off by Junior.

The group soon arrives at the area ruled by Doblòn with the intent to use Clark as a bargaining chip. However, Hoffman (Clark's deputy), orders Wangler to carry out an attack using a lethal gas with the aim of accomplishing two missions at once: annihilating the resistance and eliminating President Clark.

Doblòn gets a warning about the imminent attack and orders his people to move to the surface so that they can avoid the gas. When on the surface, the Bronx becomes a fierce battlefield as the two armies engage in combat.

At the end of the battle, only three people survive: Trash, Crazy Strike, and Junior. After surveying the carnage, Junior asks his father if they can go back underground since the surface wasteland is not a good place to live. Strike agrees and they invite Trash to come with them. Trash turns down their offer and leaves by himself.

== Cast ==
- Mark Gregory as Trash
- Henry Silva as Floyd Wangler
- Valeria D'Obici as Moon Gray (credited as Valerie Dobson)
- Giancarlo Prete as Strike (credited as Timothy Brent)
- Antonio Sabato as Doblòn
- Enio Girolami as President Clark (credited as Thomas Moore)
- Paolo Malco as Vice President
- Eva Czemerys as Trash's mother
- Alessandro Prete as Strike Jr.
- Moana Pozzi as Birdy
- Carla Brait as Iron Man Leader
- Massimo Vanni as Big Little Man
- Enzo G. Castellari as radio operator with mustache

== Production ==
Shot roughly 18 months after the first Bronx movie, Enzo G. Castellari stated that he was disappointed with how much muscle mass Mark Gregory had lost between part one and the sequel, which is why he keeps his jacket on for approximately 90% of the film.

Escape from the Bronx was filmed in New York and Cinecittà Film Studios in Rome. Mark Gregory was still only 19 when he starred in the film, with Enzo Castellari stating on the DVD commentary for 1990: The Bronx Warriors that his young age and lack of experience was possibly a factor in why Gregory did not last long in the film business.

== Release ==
Escape from the Bronx was released theatrically by Fulvia Film in Italy on August 25, 1983, and in the UK on September 2, 1983. Distributed by New Line Cinema, it was released in US theaters on January 18, 1985.

=== Home media ===
The film was released on VHS in 1985 by Media Home Entertainment. Specific scenes were cut out of this release for unknown reasons. The film was later re-released on VHS in 1997 by New Line Home Video.

It was released on DVD in the UK by Vipco in 2003. Australian company Stomp Entertainment released a Region 0 (uncoded) NTSC disc in 2006. So far this is the only option for American fans to purchase as the DVD has never been officially released on DVD in the United States.

In 2009, Shameless Entertainment released the film in Region 2 PAL format in the UK. The movie is part of a box set entitled "The Bronx Warriors Trilogy" with 1990: The Bronx Warriors and The New Barbarians.

Blue Underground released the film in a Blu-ray/DVD combo pack on June 30, 2015.

== Reception and legacy ==
A website dedicated to both Escape from the Bronx and its predecessor 1990: The Bronx Warriors was set up in 2004. The site contains two interviews with Enzo G. Castellari and details an ongoing attempt to locate Mark Gregory (Trash), who vanished from public view in about 1989. There is also a message in MP3 format (in Italian) from Enzo and his son Andrea to Mark asking him to get in touch and saying how much they miss him. The site was updated in 2022 with the information that Roberto Zanni had revealed that Gregory had committed suicide on January 31, 2013.

The cult TV series Mystery Science Theater 3000 (MST3K) highlighted the film with its Escape 2000 title in a seventh-season episode (#705). Most of the jokes addressed the obvious Italian setting and bad costumes, but of particular note is the character Doblòn (whose name the characters misinterpret as Toblerone) quickly winning Mike, Tom Servo, and Crow over with his over-the-top performance ("We're getting a big slab of Toblerone here!"). They would groan over his absence in the middle of the movie ("If ever a scene cried out for Toblerone!") and cheered when he made his return later in the film ("Just drink him in!"). MST3K performers Michael J. Nelson, Bill Corbett, and Kevin Murphy produced a new riffing of the film for Rifftrax on June 3, 2022.
