= The Loves and Times of Scaramouche =

- Directed by: Enzo G. Castellari
- Screenplay by: Enzo G Castellari; Tito Carpi
- Story by: Tito Carpi
- Produced by: Federico Alcardi
- Starring: Michael Sarrazin; Ursula Andress; Aldo Maccione; Giancarlo Prete
- Cinematography: Giovanni Bergamini
- Edited by: Gianfranco Amicucci
- Music by: Franco Bixio; Fabio Frizzi; Vince Tempera
- Production companies: Embassy Pictures; Epee Cinematographica; Jadran Film; Lisa Film
- Release date: 17 March 1976
- Countries: Italy; Yugoslavia; Denmark
- Languages: Italian; English

The Loves and Times of Scaramouche (Italian: Le avventure e gli amori di Scaramouche) is a 1976 comedy film directed by Enzo G. Castellari.

== Plot ==
Along with his sidekick Whistle (Giancarlo Prete), Scaramouche (Michael Sarrazin) unwittingly becomes entangled in a plot to assassinate Napoleon - only to find himself the unlikely object of desire for Napoleon's lascivious new bride, the Empress Josephine (Ursula Andress).

== Cast ==
- Michael Sarrazin as Scaramouche
- Ursula Andress as Josephine De Beauharnais
- Aldo Maccione as Napoleon Bonaparte
- Giancarlo Prete as Whistle
- Michael Forest as Danglar
- Sal Borgese
- Romano Puppo

== Release ==
The Loves and Times of Scramouche was released on March 17, 1976.

== Reception ==
Roger Ebert of the Chicago Sun-Times gave the film one-and-a-half stars out of four and revealed that "I didn't stay for the whole movie, which is sort of unusual; I like to sit through even the worst films in the hopes of finding things more atrocious than I've already seen ... But 'Scaramouche' had such a deadening quality - it was so lacking in energy and invention and wit - that somehow I knew there was no hope." Richard Eder of The New York Times wrote, "This tedious, jumpy, inept effort to do still another comic take-off on historical swashbucklery is as bad as impalement." Arthur D. Murphy of Variety dismissed the film as "a banal Italo-Yugoslavian alleged comedy effort" that was "silly, juvenile, hokey and mostly vulgar nonsense." Gene Siskel of the Chicago Tribune gave the film one star out of four and wrote that it "gets old fast unless you have an insatiable appetite for seeing actors beaned with salamis and butted with sabres." Gary Arnold of The Washington Post called it "a lot of title for very little entertainment" and a "strenuous throwaway production." Linda Gross of the Los Angeles Times called it "a silly, slapstick spaghetti spoof of swashbuckling adventure movies" and "a badly-dubbed hodge-podge" which "lacks a deft historical perspective so even the artful battle footage by photographer Giovanni Bergamini looks like it belongs in another kind of movie." Maurizio Cavagnaro of the Genoese newspaper Corriere Mercantile defined the film as an "indigestible mess".

== See also ==
- List of Italian films of 1976
