= Light Blast =

- Promotional release poster
- Directed by: Enzo G. Castellari
- Written by: Enzo G. Castellari; Tito Carpi
- Produced by: Galliano Juso; Paul J. Kelly; Achille Manzotti
- Starring: Erik Estrada; Ennio Girolami
- Cinematography: Sergio D'Offizi
- Edited by: Gianfranco Amicucci
- Music by: Guido & Maurizio De Angelis
- Production companies: Faso Film; Metro
- Distributed by: Overseas FilmGroup
- Release date: 13 August 1985
- Running time: 89 minutes
- Country: Italy

Colpi di luce (internationally released as Light Blast) is a 1985 Italian science-fiction action film directed by Enzo G. Castellari.

It stars Erik Estrada alongside Peggy Rowe, whom he would soon marry in Rome.

== Plot ==
In San Francisco, two teenagers playing hide and seek among the cars in an abandoned railway depot exchange affection. A white van arrives in the vicinity of the store and points a gun toward a large LCD clock. The teens have sex, the cannon fires all around, catches fire, and melts. Then doctor Yuri Svoboda, former University of San Francisco professor, menace the municipality of the town with his laser ray if he is not given five million dollars.

== Cast ==
- Erik Estrada as SFPD Inspector Ronn Warren
- Michael Pritchard as Swann
- Enio Girolami as Dr. Yuri Svoboda (as Thomas Moore)
- Peggy Rowe as Jacqueline

== Reception ==
"Blackmail laser for the city of San Francisco. California. Some criminals are threatening to reduce it to a heap of glowing embers unless they are given a huge sum. The authorities did not give up and investigations are handled by Ron, a skilled inspector with a reputation for hard (like the 'Dirty Harry' cop interpreted to asbestos years ago by Clint Eastwood). (...) As reflected in more than evident from the plot, it is an action film, produced by cutting the loaf typical of yellow crime. Moreover Enzo G. Castellari is a director who moves in film spectacular, but the results are not striking, however, not unseemly in the strength of his consummate craft. How, exactly. this 'Shots of light', starring Ennio Girolami, Michael Pritchard. Peggy Rowe, Bob Taylor."

"Much like the U.S. has pushed Enzo Castellari to release this crime by the pace, but the subject trivial: all other films revisited by cutting typically American. Situation experienced in many other stories and many other TV series. From Professor maniac who wants to destroy a city if it is not satisfied his thirst for power and dollars, the intrepid cop who alone makes a massacre of unspeakable proportions, by the death of the great cop chases flat out better, engine on land, on streets and highways of the metropolis. All in all, the film has merit, is to be attributed to the unconscious provincialism Castellari that focuses the true protagonist of the story: San Francisco, photographed documentary with wisdom, in its new and its old. San Francisco, with its skyscrapers and its nineteenth-century houses, with its beautiful bay, its iconic bridge. Here, then, that the good cop's lives on a houseboat, the cop does amazing chase of a stock car (sort of off-road racing), while the bad guy working with none other than a laser beam. To face it is, in the role of Lt. Ronnie Warren, that Erik Estrada known to television audiences for a successful series, that of 'Chips' intrepid policemen of California Street."

"Maybe Castellari does not know, but probably no one before him had done with the laser power our cars. A new type of fuel? No, let's say a propellant, a pretext to launch cars, trucks and vans of all shapes and sizes in the usual whirlwind of slalom, carambola and spin. For years the amount of our Series B movie adventure filmed in the U.S. is the car crash in slow motion video (best final burst). Shots of light is not the exception, but uses the expedient mad-scientist-with-deadly-weapon to heat engines."
