= Sette note in nero =

1977 film directed by Lucio Fulci

- Original Italian film poster
- Directed by: Lucio Fulci
- Screenplay by: Lucio Fulci; Roberto Gianviti; Dardano Sacchetti
- Produced by: Franco Cuccu
- Starring: Jennifer O'Neill; Gabriele Ferzetti; Marc Porel; Gianni Garko; Ida Galli; Jenny Tamburi
- Cinematography: Sergio Salvati
- Edited by: Ornella Micheli
- Music by: Franco Bixio; Fabio Frizzi; Vince Tempera
- Production company: Cinecompany
- Distributed by: Cineriz
- Release date: 10 August 1977 (Italy)
- Running time: 98 minutes
- Country: Italy

Sette note in nero (lit. 'Seven notes in black', released in English-language territories as The Psychic (Note: Other alternate titles including Seven Notes in Black, Murder to the Tune of Seven Black Notes, and Death Tolls Seven Times.)) is a 1977 Italian giallo film directed by Lucio Fulci, from a screenplay co-written with Roberto Gianviti and Dardano Sacchetti. It stars Jennifer O'Neill, Gabriele Ferzetti, Marc Porel, Gianni Garko, Ida Galli, and Jenny Tamburi.

The film involves a woman (O'Neill) who begins experiencing psychic visions that lead her to discover a murder; her husband is charged with the killing. The psychic must embark on an investigation with a paranormal researcher to clear her husband's name of the crime.

Sette note in nero was released in Italy by Cineriz on 10 August 1977.

== Plot ==
In 1959, a mother in Dover kills herself by jumping off a cliff; at the same time, her daughter Virginia, living in Florence, witnesses the death in a vision. Eighteen years later, Virginia is a socialite married to wealthy Italian businessman Francesco Ducci. After Francesco leaves on a business trip, Virginia has a new vision of an elderly woman murdered and walled in by a limping man. While renovating her husband's abandoned villa outside Siena, she discovers a skeleton behind a crack in the wall. A forensic examination identifies the skeleton as Francesco's ex-girlfriend Agnese Bignardi, who died in 1972. He is arrested as the prime suspect.

To exonerate Francesco, Virginia seeks help from her parapsychologist friend Luca Fattori. Since her vision featured a yellow taxi, Virginia tracks down a taxi driver who recalls driving Agnese and a bearded man with a limp to an art gallery. Virginia finds a newspaper article about the theft of a Vermeer painting, which appeared in her vision, featuring the photo of a bearded man, gallery director Emilio Rospini. She talks with Rospini's wife, who reveals that her husband walked with a limp for a year after falling from a horse. Rospini returns home, having shaved his beard and resembling the man from Virginia's vision. Virginia asks Rospini about his relationship with Agnese, but he angrily orders her to leave.

Virginia finds the same magazine from her vision, featuring Agnese on the front cover, at a newsstand. Noticing a horse's head on the cover, Virginia and Luca speak with a stablehand who recalls selling the cover photo to the magazine. He recognizes the horses in the photo, one of which belongs to Rospini, and says the photo was taken in 1973. Francesco is released on bail, and suspicion falls on Rospini. Francesco's sister Gloria gives Virginia a wristwatch that plays a haunting tune, which she recalls hearing in her vision. Noticing that the magazine is in its first year of publication, Luca concludes that Virginia has experienced a premonition, not a vision of past events.

Virginia goes to meet a mysterious elderly woman who left a message on her answering machine, claiming to have information about the case. Arriving at her house, Virginia finds her dead, just as in her vision. When Rospini appears, Virginia grabs a letter featured in her vision and escapes to a nearby church that is undergoing repairs. While trying to reach Virginia on a wooden scaffold, Rospini trips and falls to the ground. Virginia runs back to the nearby Ducci villa and calls Francesco to pick her up.

At the hospital, Rospini confesses to the police: In 1972, the elderly woman, Signora Casati, had a buyer for the Vermeer painting. Francesco, Rospini, and Agnese planned to steal the painting. Francesco killed a guard at the art gallery, a fact mentioned in a letter Agnese wrote to Casati. When Agnese's skeleton was found, it became evident that Francesco killed her. Casati was already dead when Rospini arrived at her house, having been killed by Francesco, who sustained a twisted ankle after jumping out of a window. When Virginia arrived, Rospini chased her only to retrieve the letter.

When Francesco arrives at the villa, Virginia is alarmed by his limp. He sees the incriminating letter and, believing Virginia has read it, knocks her out with a fireplace poker. As Virginia lies on the floor, he prepares to entomb her into the excavated hole in the wall. Virginia finally realizes that she was the victim all along. Francesco covers up the freshly finished wall with a large cabinet.

Having learned from the stableman that the magazine cover photo actually dates back to 1972, Luca races over to the Ducci villa. Stopped by two motorcycle policemen, he insults one of the officers and gets them to follow him to the villa. There, Francesco invites them all in, feigning concern over Virginia's disappearance. Despite Luca's suspicions, they find no evidence of foul play. As Luca turns to leave, escorted by the police, Virginia's wristwatch chime starts playing from the wall behind the cabinet, exposing Francesco and saving Virginia.

== Cast ==
- Jennifer O'Neill as Virginia Ducci
  - Fausta Avelli as young Virginia Ducci
- Gabriele Ferzetti as Emilio Rospini
- Marc Porel as Luca Fattori
- Gianni Garko as Francesco Ducci
- Ida Galli (credited as Evelyn Stewart) as Gloria Ducci
- Jenny Tamburi as Bruna
- Fabrizio Jovine as Commissioner D'Elia
- Riccardo Parisio Perrotti as Melli
- Vito Passeri as the caretaker
- Loredana Savelli as Giovanna Rospini
- Bruno Corazzari as Canevari
- Veronica Michielini as Giuliana Casati
- Paolo Pacino as Inspector Russi
- Elizabeth Turner as Virginia's mother
- Luigi Diberti as the magistrate
- Ugo D'Alessio as the gallery owner
- Camilla Fulci as Agnese Begnardi (uncredited, still only)

== Production ==
=== Development ===
According to director Lucio Fulci, Sette note in nero gestated over several years in development hell because producer Luigi De Laurentiis was unsure about what type of film could be made out of it. Ernesto Gastaldi stated that he had written a twelve-page outline of the film with director/producer Alberto Pugliese, titled Pentagramma in nero (lit. 'Black Pentagram') or Sinfonia in nero (lit. 'Black Symphony'). The story dealt with a woman who dreams of a murder, and believes it will happen in real life. Film critic and historian Roberto Curti has noted that there exists a script kept at the Centro Sperimentale di Cinematografia library, titled Incubus (Pentagramma in nero), which is credited to Gastaldi, Sergio Corbucci and Mahnamen Velasco and is dated March 1972, but states that this was, in fact, an early title for La morte accarezza a mezzanotte (1972); however, Curti notes that both La morte accarezza a mezzanotte and Sette note in nero share near-identical premises of women having premonitions of murder.

Sette note in nero was written by Roberto Gianviti and Dardano Sacchetti. Fulci and Gianviti had collaborated on several films together, including Operazione San Pietro (1967), One on Top of the Other (1969), A Lizard in a Woman's Skin (1971), Don't Torture a Duckling (1972), White Fang (1973) and Challenge to White Fang (1974). Sacchetti would later collaborate with Fulci on Zombi 2 (1979), City of the Living Dead (1980), The Beyond (1981), The House by the Cemetery (1981), and The New York Ripper (1982).

Fulci and Gianviti had been put under contract by De Laurentiis and his son Aurelio based on the success of their earlier gialli; given creative freedom to conceive a project in the same genre, they chose to adapt writer (later a film critic and distributor) Vieri Razzini's 1972 mystery novel Terapia mortale. Described by Curti as "a banal and rather poorly written whodunnit", the novel follows parapsychologist Patrick Delli as he investigates the death of his friend Mark, which he discovers to have been an act of murder through the use of psychic powers, and that Mark's wife Veronica (who Patrick is in love with) is another potential target. Barbara Bouchet was originally intended as one of the film's leads; in a July 1974 interview, she revealed that filming was intended to take place in İzmir. However, the De Laurentiises were not satisfied with Fulci and Gianviti's material, and Sacchetti was brought on board to work with the pair in summer 1975. Sacchetti noted that Fulci and Gianviti had little to show for half a year's work on the project, largely because the former misinterpreted the novel's portrayal of parapsychology as a type of magic instead of psychoanalysis. Fulci initially resented Sacchetti due to the success of his collaborations with Dario Argento and referred to him as "De Laurentiis' spy", but eventually warmed to him after Gianviti approved of his additions to the script, which served to "unblock" difficulties that Fulci and Gianviti had originally encountered, while remaining true to the spirit of the novel.

After Fulci, Gianviti and Sacchetti's initial draft was rejected by the De Laurentiises, Sacchetti suggested that they work on a new story from scratch, and asked Fulci what his biggest obsession was. When Fulci informed him that this obsession was "fate", he returned the next day with an entirely new outline that met with Fulci and Gianviti's approval. Fulci impulsively devised the title Sette note in nero after Sacchetti informed him that a carillon would serve as a key plot device in the story. Sacchetti attributes "70%" of the resulting script to Gianviti, and described his contributions as "a touch of Argento to a traditional mystery plot. The 'touch of Argento' were the suspenseful situations in general, the modalities of the deaths, especially the victim's point of view". Although an announcement that production of the film, then bearing the novel's title, would begin in November 1975 was deposited at the Ministry of Spectacle, the film was shelved again by the De Laurentiises, as their company was in financial trouble due to political and social unrest in Italy. Within several months, Fulci was able to make a deal with a smaller production company, Cinecompany, and distributor Cineriz to make the film.

Aside from sharing a theme of psychic powers and the character of Luca Fattori being a parapsychologist who harbors romantic feelings for the married Virginia, the resulting film bares little resemblance to Razzini's novel. Curti notes that Sette note in nero features several scenes and themes influenced by Fulci's earlier films, including the potentially unjust imprisonment of a man for the murder of his wife (One on Top of the Other), precognition (A Lizard in a Woman's Skin) and a character who falls to their death on a cliffside (Don't Torture a Duckling); other possible influences on the narrative include the novel Night has a Thousand Eyes by Cornell Woolrich (whose works were possible influences on One on Top of the Other and A Lizard in a Woman's Skin) and the films Don't Look Now (1973) and Death Rite (1976).

=== Filming ===
The film was shot between September and November 1976 under the working title Dolce come morire. It was shot at the Incir-De Paolis Studios in Rome and at Arezzo, Siena in Italy and in Dover in England. Fulci's daughter Camilla stood in for photographs of Agnese Begnardi. Cameraman Franco Bruni commented on the cinematography in the film, stating that "we did a frantic use of zoom in this film" and "often used the tracking shot backwards, to reveal things. The camera was moving all the time."

=== Music ===
"Lucio was an important director in my career and also a friend, a person for whom I had strong feelings".

— Composer Fabio Frizzi on collaborating with Fulci

Composer Fabio Frizzi also contributed to Paura nella città dei morti viventi, ...E tu vivrai nel terrore! L'aldilà, Manhattan Baby, and Fulci's 1990 film Un gatto nel cervello. The film's score was performed on a carillon, accompanied by stringed instruments, synthesisers and piano notes. The score has been described as "simple, elegant and gravely beautiful", and has been noted for "steer[ing] clear of rampant atonality and shrieking strings", unlike typical giallo film scores.

Some of the film's music was later used in the 2003 American film Kill Bill Volume 1, directed by Quentin Tarantino. A medley of the score was later included as part of Frizzi's 2013 Fulci 2 Frizzi live tour, including the 2014 live album release Fulci 2 Frizzi: Live at Union Chapel.

== Style ==
Sette note in nero is the fourth giallo film to have been helmed by Fulci, following One on Top of the Other, A Lizard in a Woman's Skin and Don't Torture a Duckling. Fulci's gialli have been cited as being "a far cry from his later excessive gross-out horrors", showing that the director was able to "put his finger on the free sexuality that permeated the culture at the time and the repercussions that came along with it". The film, along with the rest of Fulci's oeuvre, has been described as "progress[ing] as if the characters are trapped in some awful, illogical dream, from which there is no escape". The film's title has been noted as one of many giallo titles using either numbers or animal references, having been directly compared to Sette scialli di seta gialla.

Curti stated that the film should "more properly be considered as a 'female gothic'", with a film updated to contemporary times and blended mystery and the paranormal. In 1970s Italy, the paranormal was one of the country's most durable obsessions. This included Pier Carpi's popular books about history of magic and Cagliostro and a book of alleged prophecies of Pope John XXIII. Paranormal themes were also explored in adult comics and television miniseries such as Il segno del comando and ESP based on Dutch psychic Gerard Croiset. Filmmakers and screenwriters also delved into these themes such as Riccardo Freda, Piero Regnoli, Demofilo Fidani and Pupi Avati.

== Release ==
Sette note in nero was released in Italy on 10 August 1977 where it was distributed by Cineriz. The film was released in the United States by Group 1 International Distribution Organization under the title The Psychic, opening regionally in Indianapolis, Indiana on 26 January 1979. The film continued to open regionally in the United States in other markets, with a Los Angeles release on 2 May 1979.

It has been released under several alternative English titles, including Murder to the Tune of the Seven Black Notes, Seven Notes in Black and Death Tolls Seven Times.

=== Home media ===
The film was released on DVD in English under the title The Psychic in October 2007 by Severin Films.

A Blu-ray of the film was released in the United States by Scorpion Releasing in 2019; this release, created from a 2K scan of the original camera negative, includes English and Italian audio, an audio commentary with film historian Troy Howarth and an interview with Sacchetti. In the United Kingdom, a bilingual Blu-ray distributed by Shameless Screen Entertainment was released on 9 August 2021, featuring a revised subtitle translation for the Italian track, interviews with Fulci's daughter Antonella, Sacchetti and Frizzi, and a demonstration of the film's 2K restoration process.

In 2023, Severin Films released a four-disc 4K UHD Blu-ray and Blu-ray set, including a compact disc of the film's original score.

== Reception ==
=== Box office ===
The film grossed a total of 594,648,345 Italian lire domestically. Curti described the film's reception in Italy as "nondescript (and therefore disappointing)", stating that it was released during a period where the giallo was waning, where a film "completely devoid of blood and gore and ultimately downbeat" was not of the interest of moviegoers.

=== Critical response ===
Linda Gross of the Los Angeles Times felt that the film's English dubbing was poor, but favorably described the film as "a scary, claustrophobic... and convoluted" film. A review in The Washington Post by Gary Arnold described the film as "an uneven experiment in terror". Arnold was critical of the post-dubbed nature of the sound, and of Fulci's "excesses of enthusiasm" in direction, but felt that this was more enjoyable than the "laborious tease" of the contemporary film Halloween.

Ted Mahar of The Oregonian wrote that the film is a "nicely photographed but insanely protracted story that could have been wrapped up in 45 minutes or so." The Abilene Reporter-News's Danny Goddard similarly felt the film's screenplay was convoluted, and criticized its special effects as "nothing special."

DVD Talk's Stuart Galbraith gave Sette note in nero three-and-a-half stars out of five, calling it "a very effective little thriller, smartly directed and engrossing". Galbraith felt that the film "offers few surprises" but moves with "palpable suspense", and added that the final scenes are "genuinely harrowing". Writing for AllMovie, Sandra Brennan rated the film one star out of five.

Bloody Disgusting's Chris Eggertsen included the film as number seven in a countdown of the "Top Ten Underrated Horror Gems", citing its "excellent cinematography [and] deft use of color", though criticising its "poor use of dubbing". Leslie Felperin, writing in a retrospective for The Guardian, awarded the film three out of five stars, writing "like many other so-called classics from the giallo cupboard, the script is cheesy tosh with a nasty taste for violence against women; you have to put it down as par for the course given the time it was made. However, the clothes, interior design and general film-making flair are divine."

Sette note in nero has been compared to the American film Eyes of Laura Mars, released the following year. Italian film critic Riccardo Strada has described Sette note in nero as "effectively sinister and disturbing", finding it full of "healthy unease". (Note: Original text—"Di grande interesse anche alcune titoli di Fulci come Sette note in nero del 1977, efficacemente sinistro e disturbante, un prodotto artigianale, ma ancora oggi denso di sana inquietudine".) On the review aggregator website Rotten Tomatoes, 100% of 5 critics' reviews are positive.

== Remakes ==
The 1984 Indian Tamil-language film Nooraavathu Naal is loosely based on Sette note in nero. Another Indian remake, the Hindi-language 100 Days, was released in 1991.

=== Proposed American remake ===
Sometime in the 1990s, filmmaker Quentin Tarantino considered remaking Sette note in nero, with Jackie Brown star Bridget Fonda in the role of Virginia. By the year 2000, Tarantino gave an update on the proposed remake: "It's a project in the murky future. I don't even own the rights to that stuff. It's one of those things where it's like if somebody buys the rights to make it, I won't make it. They can totally fuck it up. If it's meant to happen, it'll happen". No further remarks on the project were made until Sacchetti revealed in an interview conducted for the film's 2019 Blu-ray that he had been in contact with producers from Sony Pictures, who were interested in having Tarantino or other directors remake the film.
