= 1990: The Bronx Warriors =

1982 film by Enzo G. Castellari

- Italian theatrical release poster by Enzo Sciotti
- 1990: I guerrieri del Bronx
- Directed by: Enzo G. Castellari
- Screenplay by: Dardano Sacchetti; Elisa Livia Briganti; Enzo G. Castellari
- Story by: Dardano Sacchetti
- Produced by: Fabrizio De Angelis
- Starring: Vic Morrow; Christopher Connelly; Fred Williamson; Mark Gregory
- Cinematography: Sergio Salvati
- Edited by: Gianfranco Amicucci
- Music by: Walter Rizzati
- Production company: Deaf International Film
- Distributed by: Fulvia Film
- Release date: October 29, 1982 (Italy)
- Running time: 89 minutes
- Country: Italy
- Language: English

1990: The Bronx Warriors (Italian: 1990: I guerrieri del Bronx) is a 1982 Italian action-science fiction film. It was directed by Enzo G. Castellari, who also portrays the deputy-leader of "Manhattan Incorporated"...and whose real-life daughter, Stefania Girolami, stars in the movie as "Ann".

== Plot ==
Ann is the 17-year-old heiress to the arms manufacturing giant, the Manhattan Corporation. Unable to face her guilt over inheriting a morally questionable company when she turns 18, Ann runs away into the lawless wasteland of the New York City borough of the Bronx. The film's opening intertitle explains: "1990. The Bronx is officially declared 'No Man's Land'. The authorities give up all attempts to restore law and order. From then on, the area is ruled by the Riders."

Attacked by a roller skating gang called the Zombies, Ann is saved by members of a motorcycle gang called the Riders and taken under the protection of their leader, Trash. They quickly fall in love.

Another powerful gang, called the Tigers, kills a Rider named Chris. The Tigers’ leader, the Ogre, informs Trash that Chris was carrying a "gizmo" – a covert listening device that looks like a watch and works on the same radio frequency as the Manhattan police. The Manhattan Corporation uses it to confirm Ann's location.

The Manhattan Corporation hires Hammer, a ruthless and psychopathic mercenary, to retrieve Ann. When he enters the Bronx, he kills two Riders, plants a golden ring in the gang's headquarters, and then flees the scene. The Riders give chase and try to catch Hammer, but he escapes.

Ann finds the golden ring and gives it to Trash, who recognizes that it belongs to the Tigers. Believing the Tigers were behind Hammer's attack, the Riders call for war. Trash, however, is skeptical.

The Zombies ambush and kidnap Ann. Trash tells the other Riders that he wants to ally himself with the Ogre to rescue her. Most of the gang dislikes this idea. As Trash and two loyal Riders fight their way across the Bronx, they encounter a musical-theatre-inspired gang, and a subterranean-dwelling gang called the Scavengers, which kills one of the Riders.

Meanwhile, a traitorous Rider named Ice discovers a local man named Hot Dog is working with Hammer. Ice informs Hammer about Ann's kidnapping and Trash's plan to save her. Ice then goes to the Zombies' headquarters and warns their leader, Golem, about the impending rescue attempt.

Trash reaches the Tigers' headquarters, where Hammer attempts to frame him for killing a Tiger. When Trash is captured, however, he convinces the Ogre that the murderer is Hammer and he is working to turn all the Bronx gangs against each another. Trash further explains the situation and proposes that he and the Ogre save Ann. The Ogre agrees, and so he, his right-hand-woman Witch, and Trash head back across the Bronx.

The trio make it to the Zombies' headquarters. While the Ogre and Golem duel, Trash frees Ann from her chains. When Ice tries to run away, Hot Dog tries to stop him and is stabbed to death by Ice. The jaded Ice criticizes Trash for being an unrealistic leader and risking everything for a wealthy outsider like Ann. The two men fight until Ice is impaled and dies.

Ann celebrates her 18th birthday at the Tigers' headquarters. During the party, a Manhattan Corporation private army, led by Hammer, invades the building and proceeds to massacre everyone there. Despite his orders to retrieve Ann, the insane Hammer declares there will be no survivors. Ann is shot and killed while defending Trash from gunfire. Infuriated, Trash kills Hammer and drags the corpse behind his motorcycle as he rides through the Bronx.

== Cast ==
- Stefania Girolami as Ann
- Mark Gregory as Trash
- Vic Morrow as Hammer
- Christopher Connelly as Hot Dog
- Fred Williamson as The Ogre
- Elisabetta Dessy as Witch
- Rocco Lero as Paul
- George Eastman as Golem
- Carla Brait as Iron Man Leader
- Joshua Sinclair as Ice
- Enio Girolami as Ted Fisher
- Enzo G. Castellari as the Vice President
- Matt Malinowski as Hair Man

== Production ==
The idea for the film was first envisioned by producer Fabrizio De Angelis when he missed a subway stop for his Manhattan hotel and ended up in a dangerous neighborhood in the Bronx. De Angelis stated he imagined the idea of a futuristic city where young hoods would fight for their home.

1990: The Bronx Warriors was one of the three science fiction films Enzo G Castellari made with producer Fabrizio De Angelis. These films take influence from Mad Max 2 (1981), The Warriors (1979), and Escape from New York (1981). Castellari changed some of De Angelis' plot ideas while filming, including incorporating more weird gangs such as the roller skating gang. When discussing 1990: The Bronx Warriors, The New Barbarians and Escape from the Bronx, Castellari stated the three films were written, prepared and filmed in six months.

Italian regulations required that 50% of a film had to be shot in Italy. To solve this situation, the film was shot on location in the Bronx with interiors shot in Rome.

== Release ==
1990: The Bronx Warriors was released on October 29, 1982, in Italy.

== Reception and Legacy ==
In a contemporary review, Kim Newman wrote in the Monthly Film Bulletin that the film contains the "usual virtues and vices of the Italian rip-off" noting that it was predominantly derivative of Escape from New York and The Warriors as well taking smaller elements from The Exterminator, Class of 1984 and Mad Max 2. Newman stated that "Castellari nimbly steals back all the stylistic elements that Carpenter and Hill poached from Leone's Westerns in the first place." The review praised the "attractive Panavision photography" and that the editing does "the best to conceal the fact that the epic battles and quests cover an extremely limited area of the Bronx." In his book Science Fiction, Phil Hardy also stated that the film was derivative of Escape From New York and The Warriors. The review went on to describe it as "riddled with narrative non-sequiteurs as it is devoid of cinematic imagination or élan." Variety referred to the film as an "exceedingly silly Italian action picture" that was "poorly scripted" and "lacks atmosphere". Variety praised Fred Williamson, stating that he "comes off as the best in the cast, handling himself smoothly in fight scenes which owe more to Italian sword 'n sandal programmers than recent violent epics." Alan Jones reviewed the film in Starburst, finding that Dardano Sacchetti's story "doesn't jell under Enzo G. Castellari's messy and pendantic direction" and that the film had "obnoxious characters".

AllMovie described the film as "one of the more successful examples of the post-apocalyptic action film genre that became popular during the early '80s" and that it was "probably too silly and overblown for a general audience, but is likely to please exploitation fans in search of cheap thrills". The review praised Sergio Salvati's cinematography and Walter Rizzati's rock music-oriented score. The review noted that these elements did not compensate for the films "sillier excesses" such as the roller-skating gang and that the leads of Stefania Girolami and Marco di Gregorio were bland protagonists.

Co-star Joshua Sinclair ("Ice") went on to script the popular TV miniseries Shaka Zulu.

Star Mark Gregory ("Trash") committed suicide on January 31, 2013, via an injection of psychotropic drugs. He was 48 years old.

== See also ==
- List of action films of the 1980s
- List of Italian films of 1982
- List of science fiction films of the 1980s
