= Dardano Sacchetti =

Italian screenwriter (born 1944)

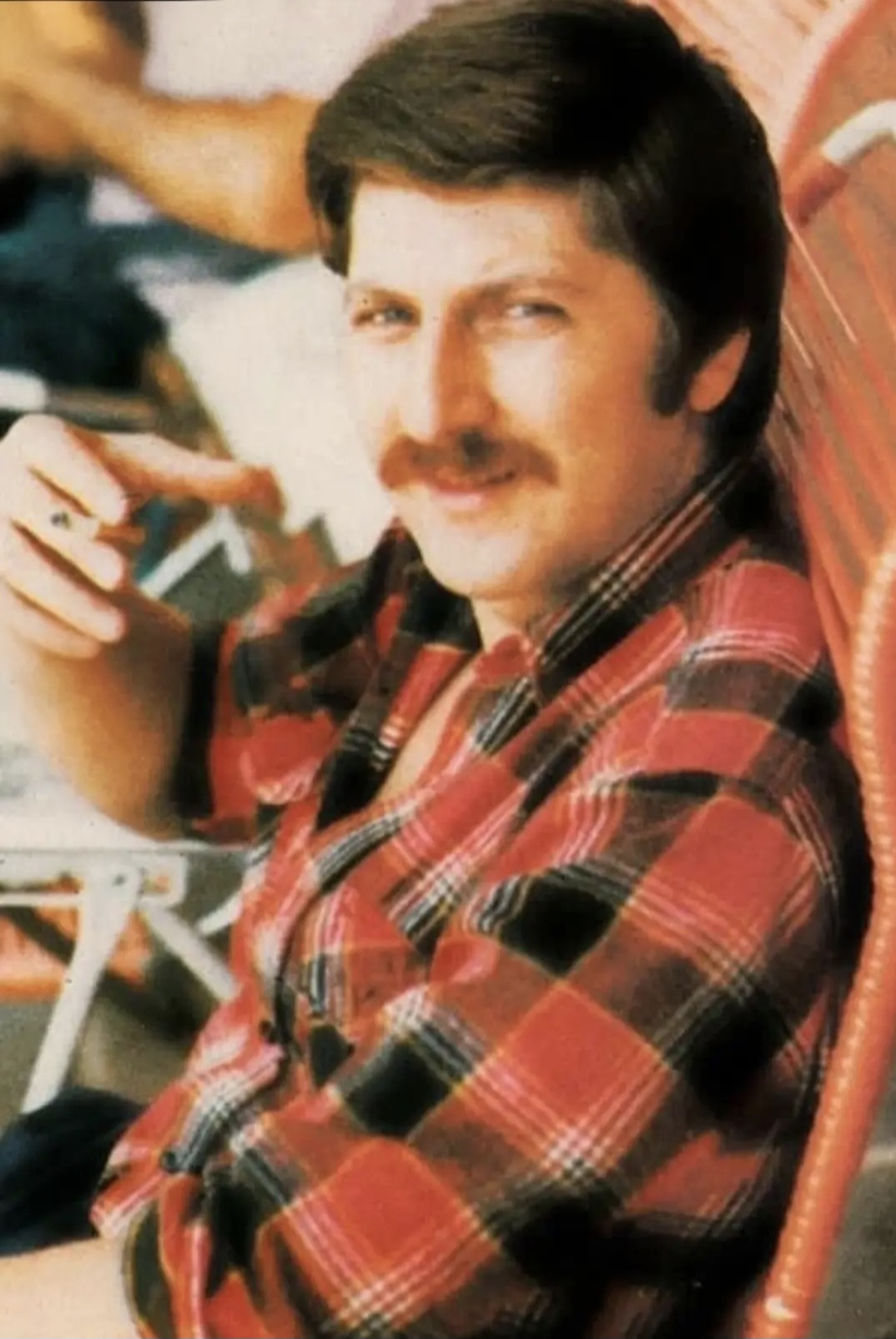
- Sacchetti in the 1970s
- Born: 27 June 1944 (age 81); Montenero di Bisaccia, Kingdom of Italy
- Other names: Frank Costa; Jimmy Gould; David Parker Jr.; Jerry Goldsmith
- Occupation: Screenwriter

Dardano Sacchetti (born 27 June 1944) is an Italian screenwriter who often worked with Italian directors Lamberto Bava and Lucio Fulci.

== Biography ==
Sacchetti was born in 1944, in Italy. His first screen credit was for Dario Argento's 1971 film The Cat o' Nine Tails. He predominantly worked with Lucio Fulci and Lamberto Bava.

Sacchetti has worked with several television film projects with Lamberto Bava in the later half of the 1980s. Sacchetti stated that for his screenplays, he would only learn who the director would be a week before the film went into production.

Producers such as De Angelis would come to Sacchetti and ask him to write two to five lines for a film in various genres such as adventure films, westerns and pornography. Following this posters would be made for the films. When Foreign production had found interest in his write-ups, he would state that De Angelis would phone him and tell him which of the stories he had potential to sell and to write the scripts immediately.

Sacchetti has worked with several television film projects with Lamberto Bava in the later half of the 1980s. As of 2017, Sacchetti was still writing for film and television.

== Partial filmography ==
Title	Year	Credited as			Notes	Ref(s)
Title	Year	Screenwriter	Screen story author	Other	Notes	Ref(s)
The Cat o' Nine Tails	1971	Yes				
A Bay of Blood	1971		Yes			
Emergency Squad	1974	Yes	Yes			
Manhunt in the City	1975	Yes	Yes			
Mark of the Cop	1975	Yes	Yes			
Mark Shoots First	1975	Yes	Yes			
Rome Armed to the Teeth	1976	Yes				
Cross Shot	1976	Yes				
Free Hand for a Tough Cop	1976	Yes	Yes			|
Mark Strikes Again	1976	Yes				
The Cynic, the Rat and the Fist	1977	Yes				
Destruction Force	1977	Yes				
Stunt Squad	1977	Yes	Yes			
A Man Called Magnum	1977	Yes	Yes			
Sette note in nero	1977	Yes	Yes			
Shock	1977	Yes				
Zombi 2	1979	Yes			Uncredited	
City of the Living Dead	1980	Yes	Yes			
The Beyond	1981	Yes	Yes			
The House by the Cemetery	1981	Yes				
The New York Ripper	1982	Yes				
Manhattan Baby	1982	Yes	Yes			
The Scorpion with Two Tails	1982		Yes			
Amityville II: The Possession	1982	Yes			Uncredited	
1990: The Bronx Warriors	1982	Yes	Yes			
Ironmaster	1983	Yes				
A Blade in the Dark	1983	Yes	Yes			
The Atlantis Interceptors	1983	Yes	Yes			
Warriors of the Year 2072	1984	Yes	Yes			
Monster Shark	1984	Yes				
Demons	1985	Yes	Yes			
Cut and Run	1985	Yes	Yes			
Demons 2	1986	Yes	Yes			
Body Count	1986	Yes				
Specters	1987	Yes			Sacchetti claims he did not work on this script.	
Delta Force Commando	1987	Yes	Yes			
The Church	1989		Yes		Uncredited.	
The Teddy Bear	1994	Yes				
L'importante è non farsi notare	—N/a		Yes			
Scusi lei è normale?	1979	Yes	Yes			
Cannibal Apocalypse	1980	Yes				
La cameriera seduce i villeggianti	—N/a	Yes				
The Last Hunter	1980	Yes				
Pierino il fichissimo	—N/a	Yes	Yes			
Blue Island	1982	Yes	Yes			
Pierino la peste alla riscossa	—N/a	Yes	Yes			
Thunder Warrior	1983	Yes	Yes			
Exterminators of the Year 3000	1983	Yes	Yes			
Impatto mortale	—N/a	Yes	Yes			
Man Hunt	1985		Yes			
Midnight Killer	1986	Yes	Yes			
Evil Senses	—N/a	Yes				
Superfantagenio	—N/a		Yes			
Thunder Warrior II	—N/a	Yes	Yes			
Colpo di Stato	—N/a	Yes	Yes			
Karate Warrior	—N/a	Yes	Yes			
I predatori della pietra magica	—N/a	Yes	Yes			
Ratman	—N/a	Yes	Yes			
Il ragazzo dal kimono d'oro 2	—N/a	Yes	Yes			
Afganistan - The Last War Bus	—N/a	Yes	Yes			
Bye Bye Vietnam	—N/a	Yes	Yes			
I ragazzi del 42° plotone	—N/a	Yes	Yes			
Money	—N/a	Yes	Yes			
Angel with a Gun	—N/a	Yes	Yes			
Il ragazzo dal kimono d'oro 3	—N/a	Yes	Yes			
Italia '90 - Notti magiche	—N/a	Yes	Yes			
Alibi perfetto	—N/a	Yes	Yes			
Alex l'ariete	—N/a	Yes	Yes			
Bastardi	—N/a	Yes				
Blood of the Losers	—N/a	Yes	Yes			
Tulpa	—N/a		Yes			
Roma nuda... come tutto ebbe inizio	—N/a	Yes	Yes			
La madre	—N/a	Yes	Yes			

== Footnotes ==
=== Sources ===
- Curti, Roberto (2013). Italian Crime Filmography, 1968-1980. McFarland. ISBN 978-0786469765.
- Curti, Roberto (2017). Italian Gothic Horror Films, 1970-1979. McFarland. ISBN 978-1476629605.
- Curti, Roberto (2019). Italian Gothic Horror Films, 1980-1989. McFarland. ISBN 978-1476672434.
- Hutchings, Peter (2017). Historical Dictionary of Horror Cinema (2 ed.). Rowman & Littlefield. ISBN 978-1538102442.
- Kinnard, Roy; Crnkovich, Tony (2017). Italian Sword and Sandal Films, 1908-1990. McFarland. ISBN 978-1476662916.
- Paul, Louis (2015). Italian Horror Film Directors. McFarland.
- Shipka, Danny (2011). Perverse Titillation: The Exploitation Cinema of Italy, Spain and France, 1960–1980. McFarland. ISBN 978-0786486090.
