= Great White (1981 film) =

The Last Shark
- Italian film poster
- Directed by: Enzo G. Castellari
- Screenplay by: Marc Princi
- Produced by: Maurizio Amati; Ugo Tucci
- Starring: James Franciscus; Vic Morrow; Micaela Pignatelli; Stefania Girolami Goodwin; Joshua Sinclair; Giancarlo Prete
- Cinematography: Alberto Spagnoli
- Edited by: Gianfranco Amicucci
- Music by: Guido & Maurizio De Angelis
- Production company: Uti Productions/Horizon Productions
- Distributed by: Variety Distribution, Film Ventures International (U.S. release, March 1982)
- Release date: April 2, 1981 (Italy)
- Running time: 87 minutes
- Country: Italy
- Box office: $18 million (USA) or $3 million

The Last Shark (a.k.a. Great White; Italian: L'ultimo squalo) is a 1981 Italian horror film directed by Enzo G. Castellari, having originally been assigned to Ruggero Deodato. In the film James Franciscus and Vic Morrow attempt to save hundreds of swimmers in a coastal resort after a large great white shark starts terrorizing the area and eating tourists.

The film did well at the box office, grossing over $18 million in its first month in the United States; however, its North American release was later blocked after the filmmakers were accused of plagiarizing Jaws (1975).

== Plot ==
While wind-surfing near the seaside community of Port Harbor, a young man is killed by a giant great white shark. Horror author Peter Benton and professional shark hunter Ron Hamer realize the truth, but ambitious mayor William Wells refuses to accept that a shark threat exists, fearing that a cancelled wind-surfing regatta would derail his campaign to become state governor. Wells has shark nets installed, but the sounds of teenagers splashing in the surf leads the shark to rip through the nets. The next day, the shark plows through the wind surfers, knocking them off their boards, before targeting the mayor's aide and eating him.

Wells can no longer hide the truth and Benton and Hamer head out to sea, planning to feed the shark dynamite and cause it to explode. However, the shark traps them in a cave and the men have to use their dynamite just to escape. Meanwhile, Benton's daughter Jenny and some of her friends head out on a yacht, armed with some steak and a shotgun, intending to shoot the shark. Instead, its powerful bites on the bait knock Jenny into the water. Her friends pull her back on board, but the shark bites off one of her legs in the process. Mayor Wells' son was one of the friends she went out with and Benton blames him for her injury. Determined to do something right, Wells sets out in a helicopter armed with a steak, apparently intending to hoist the shark into the air and suffocate it, but the shark is too powerful; when it bites into the steak dangling from a winch, it shakes the copter and knocks Wells into the sea. The shark then bites him in half before lunging into the helicopter, dragging it into the sea.

Benton and Hamer go back out to blow up the shark. After an argument, Benton agrees to allow Hamer to be the one to go down with the dynamite strapped into a belt around his waist. Thinking the shark might be hiding in the downed helicopter, Hamer investigates it. The shark sneaks up on him and attacks and, despite Benton's attempts to save him, Hamer becomes wrapped up in a line and is towed to his death by the shark.

Meanwhile, a shark hunter chains some spare ribs to the side of a dock. The hunter, a TV news cameraman and some spectators go stand on the dock when the shark takes the ribs, towing the dock out into the ocean. Suddenly, the shark begins to attack the dock, knocking the people into the water and eating the shark hunter and TV cameraman. Benton arrives and rescues the other people but gets trapped on the dock when the shark arrives to drag it further out to sea. Hamer's corpse floats by and Benton feeds it to the shark. Realizing he has the detonator in his hand, Benton leaps into the ocean and flips the switch, detonating the dynamite and blowing the shark's head off.

Back on shore, Benton is approached by TV reporter Bob Martin for comment. Benton then punches Martin, gets in a car and drives away.

== Cast ==
- James Franciscus as Peter Benton
- Vic Morrow as Ron Hamer
- Micaela Pignatelli as Gloria Benton
- Joshua Sinclair as William Wells
- Stefania Girolami Goodwin as Jenny Benton
- Giancarlo Prete as Bob Martin

== Lawsuit ==
Universal Pictures attempted to block the distribution by Film Ventures before its U.S. premiere on 5 March 1982, but the request was denied in U.S. District Court. However, on 5 April 1982, about a month into release, federal judge David V. Kenyon ruled the film was too similar to Jaws, and The Last Shark was subsequently pulled from American theaters.

== Release ==
=== Theatrical ===
Great White was released April 2, 1981 in Rome, Italy. The film was the 72nd highest-grossing film of the 1980–1981 season.

The film was released as Great White in the United States (before it was pulled from theatres there) and as Shark in the United Kingdom.

=== Home media ===
On March 5, 2013, RetroVision Entertainment released the film on DVD, marking the film's first ever official home release in the United States. The film featured a restored print and the DVD's bonus features included the short documentary Great White: The Legacy – 30 Years Later and rare theatrical trailers. The DVD was Region 0, limited to only 500 copies, and could only be purchased online.

== Soundtrack ==
On 15 October 2019, both Beat Records Company and Edizioni Cabum released the film's soundtrack by Guido & Maurizio De Angelis and Yvonne Wilkins on compact disc and vinyl for the first time in 38 years. The CD version includes a 12-page booklet and tracks that were never used in the film and the vinyl version was pressed on 180-gram vinyl and includes an illustrated internal sleeve. The release was limited to 500 copies on CD, 400 on standard vinyl and 100 on colored vinyl.

== Reception ==
Of the film, the Monthly Film Bulletin stated that "its only interest (and amusement) is the way it has solemnly transcribed [from Jaws]". The Boston Globe commented negatively on the special effects, stating that the film obviously cuts between Vic Morrow and a shot of a shark in an aquarium and that the shark in question occasionally resembled a Macy's Thanksgiving Day Parade balloon.

=== Sequel ===
Following the financial success of the film, Enzo Castellari considered making a sequel but ultimately demurred after the mechanical shark was damaged following shooting of the first movie.

=== Legacy ===
Scenes from Great White were incorporated into the 1995 Italian shark movie Cruel Jaws, which also utilized footage from Jaws. The movie Deep Blood also used a lot of footage from this movie including the oddly shaped 'balloon' shark model.
The comedy team Rifftrax released a version of this film with a comedic commentary in 2016.

== See also ==
- List of killer shark films
