= Giancarlo Prete =

Italian actor (1943–2001)

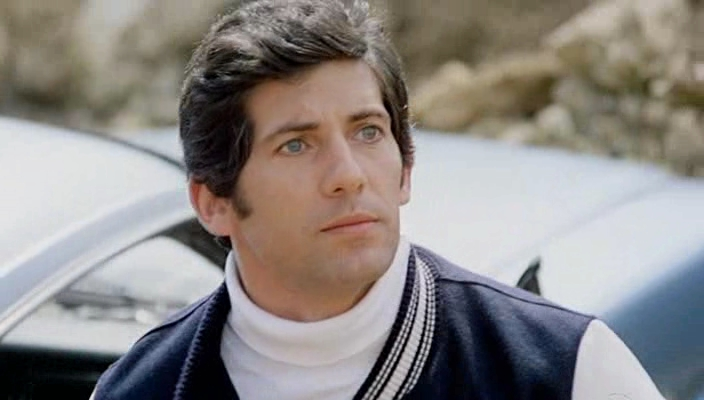
- Prete in Street Law (1974)
- Born: 5 February 1943; Rome, Italy
- Died: 9 March 2001 (aged 58); Rome, Italy
- Occupations: Actor; stuntman; dubbing director
- Years active: 1967–2001
- Spouse: Elizabeth Jacinto
- Children: Alessandro Prete

Giancarlo Prete (5 February 1943 – 9 March 2001) was an Italian actor.

== Biography ==
After he worked in the cinema as stuntman, Prete went to Alessandro Fersen's acting school (where he later returned as a teacher) and began to act in many films and in television serials, sometimes credited under the name Timothy Brent or Philip Garner.

In the following years Prete worked as dubbing director and acted only in television productions (including the Space: 1999 episode "The Troubled Spirit" as Dr. Dan Mateo).

He was married to Elizabeth Jacinto and had a son named Alessandro, who is also an actor.

Giancarlo Prete died on 9 March 2001 of a brain tumour at the age of 58.

== Filmography ==
Year	Title	Role	Notes
1967	Avenger X	Lamarro Henchman	
1968	L'Odissea	Euriale	Uncredited, 1 episode
1968	Satanik	Scagnozzo di Dodo con cravatta arancione	
1968	Il marchio di Kriminal		
1968	Bandits in Rome		
1969	El 'Che' Guevara	Miranda	
1969	I diavoli della guerra	Fred Rogers	
1970	Bocche cucite		
1970	The Martlet's Tale		
1970	Lady Caliph	L'amante di Irene	
1971	Confessions of a Police Captain	Giampaolo Rizzo	
1971	Black Belly of the Tarantula	Mario	
1971	The Price of Death	Reverend Tiller	
1971	A Fistful of Death	Sundance Kid	
1972	Hector the Mighty	Patroclo	
1972	Snow Job	Donato	
1972	A.A.A. Massaggiatrice bella presenza offresi...	1st client of Cristina	
1972	Winged Devils	Leutnant Pettarini	
1972	Sting of the West	Tedeum	
1973	The Big Family	Commissario La Manna	
1973	Kill Me, My Love!	Guido - l'amante di Laureen	
1973	The Three Musketeers of the West	Dart Coldwater jr.	
1973	Massacre in Rome	Paolo	
1973	Furto di sera bel colpo si spera		
1974	Street Law	Tommy	
1975	La nottata	Vito	
1975	Who Breaks... Pays	Antonio	
1976	The Loves and Times of Scaramouche	Whistle - the Barber	
1977	Messalina, Messalina	Gaius Silius	
1978	Non sparate sui bambini	Dino Settimi	
1979	Midnight Blue	Bruno	
1979	Baila guapa		
1981	Great White	Bob Martin	
1983	The New Barbarians	Scorpion	
1983	Escape from the Bronx	Strike	
1983	Tornado: The Last Blood	Sgt. Salvatore Maggio	
1985	Ladyhawke	Fornac	
1985	The Assisi Underground	Col. Gay	
1986	Detective School Dropouts	Mario Zanetti	
1989	La morte è di moda	Giorgio	
1990	A Season of Giants	Angolo Poliziano	TV movie
