= Delta Force Commando =

- Italian theatrical release poster
- Directed by: Pierluigi Ciriaci
- Written by: Dardano Sacchetti
- Produced by: Milos Antic
- Starring: Fred Williamson; Bo Svenson
- Cinematography: Al Bartholomew
- Edited by: Fiorenza Muller
- Music by: Elio Polizzi
- Distributed by: Life International
- Release date: November 25, 1987 (United States)
- Running time: 98 minutes
- Country: Italy

Delta Force Commando, is a 1987 Italian "macaroni combat" war film directed by Pierluigi Ciriaci as Frank Valenti and starring Fred Williamson and Bo Svenson.

== Plot ==
An American pilot and a member of the "Delta Force" set off in pursuit of a terrorist group in possession of a tactical nuclear weapon.

== Cast ==
- Brett Baxter Clark as Lieutenant Tony Turner
- Fred Williamson as Captain Samuel Beck
- Bo Svenson as Colonel Keitel
- Mark Gregory
- Divana Brandão as Maria
- Mario Novelli
- Emy Valentino
- Jean Michel Pellizza

== Release and reception ==
Delta Force Commando was released by Vista on home video in the United States on November 25, 1987.

On the original home video release, The Capital Times summarized that the "acting is terrible but there are a number of dazzling action scenes." In the German Film almanach Fischer film almanach, the reviewer found that the film was a "primitive war film" with dubious politics.

== See also ==
- List of Italian films of 1987
- Euro War
- War film
