= Hector the Mighty =

- Directed by: Enzo G. Castellari
- Written by: Enzo G. Castellari; Sandro Continenza; Lucio Fulci; Leonardo Martín
- Produced by: Edmondo Amati; Raoul Katz
- Cinematography: Guglielmo Mancori
- Music by: Francesco De Masi
- Release date: 1972
- Running time: 91 minutes
- Country: Italy
- Language: Italian

Hector the Mighty (Italian: Ettore lo fusto) is a 1972 Italian comedy film directed by Enzo G. Castellari. A parody of Homer's Iliad set in modern times, it is loosely based on the 1966 novel Le roi des Mirmidous by Henri Viard and Bernard Zacharias.

Italian horror film director Lucio Fulci co-wrote the screenplay. Producer Edmondo Amati wanted Fulci to direct it, but Fulci thought it was an inferior project and was able to get out of doing it, even though he was under contract to Amati at the time.

== Plot ==
A pimp named Horny Hector operates a brothel on property coveted by Cardinal Giove. The Cardinal comes up with a plan to force Hector into selling him the land by kidnapping Helen (an updating of the Helen of Troy story), triggering a small gang war.

== Cast ==
- Vittorio Caprioli as Menelaus
- Michael Forest as Achilles
- Giancarlo Giannini as Ulysses
- Juan Luis Galiardo as Paris
- Rosanna Schiaffino as Helen
- Philippe Leroy as Hector
- Aldo Giuffrè as Agamemnon
- Luciano Salce as Count Mercury
- Vittorio De Sica as Cardinal Jove
- Haydée Politoff as Chryseis
- Orchidea De Santis as Briseis
- Giancarlo Prete as Patroclus, aka Clò-Clò
- Franca Valeri as Cassandra
- Gianrico Tedeschi as Priam
- Caterina Boratto as Hecuba
- Gigi Rizzi as Polites
- José Calvo as The Lawyer
