= Raising Jeffrey Dahmer =

- Film poster
- Directed by: Rich Ambler
- Written by: Wood Dickinson; Christopher Ryan
- Produced by: Wood Dickinson
- Starring: Scott Cordes; Cathy Barnett; Rusty Sneary; Jeannine Hutchings; Bo Svenson
- Cinematography: Roland Schlotzhauer
- Production company: Renegade Pictures
- Distributed by: Barnholtz Entertainment
- Release dates: April 13, 2006 (Kansas); June 24, 2008 (DVD)
- Running time: 87 minutes
- Country: United States
- Language: English

Raising Jeffrey Dahmer is a 2006 American drama film based on the case of serial killer Jeffrey Dahmer. The film is directed by Rich Ambler and stars Rusty Sneary as Dahmer, Scott Cordes as his father, and Cathy Barnett as his stepmother.

== Premise ==
The film explores the childhood of Jeffrey Dahmer (Rusty Sneary) and his relationship with his father, Lionel (Scott Cordes), all during a trial in late 1991.

== Cast ==
- Scott Cordes as Lionel Dahmer
- Cathy Barnett as Shari Dahmer
- Rusty Sneary as Jeffrey Dahmer
- Jeannine Hutchings as Catherine Dahmer
- Bo Svenson as Detective John Amos
- Erin McGrane as Joyce Dahmer
- Kip Niven as Attorney Howard Parker

== Release ==
The film premiered at the Kansas City Filmmakers Jubilee on April 13, 2006, and was not released in mainstream theaters. It was later released on DVD on June 24, 2008.
