= Formula for a Murder =

- Directed by: Alberto De Martino
- Screenplay by: Alberto De Martino; Vincenzo Mannino
- Story by: Alberto De Martino; Vincenzo Mannino
- Produced by: Fabrizio De Angelis
- Starring: David Warbeck; Rossano Brazzi; Christina Nagy; Carroll Blumenberg
- Cinematography: Gianlorenzo Battaglia
- Edited by: Vincenzo Tomassi
- Music by: Francesco De Masi
- Production company: Fulvia International Films
- Release date: 1985
- Country: Italy

Formula for a Murder (Italian: 7, Hyden Park – La casa maledetta, lit. '7 Hyde Park – The Cursed House') is a 1985 Italian giallo film co-written and directed by Alberto De Martino.

The film was shot in Boston and Italy, and was one of the last films directed by De Martino. When it was released in Italy, it was marketed as a more traditional horror film, while retrospective analysis compared it to 1960s thrillers such as Taste of Fear (1961).

== Plot ==
A handsome teacher named Craig marries a wealthy, wheelchair-using woman named Joanna who has PTSD and is tormented by a traumatic event that happened in her past. As a child, she was raped by a psychotic priest and thrown down a flight of stairs. The priest used a doll to lure her to the crime scene.

Her attractive female caretaker Ruth has a lesbian attraction to her and tries to stop the marriage. As if Joanna doesn't have enough problems, her husband only married her to steal her money. He is trying to stop her from donating one-half of her wealth to a church project to which her deceased father committed her while upon his deathbed.

One by one, priests start turning up dead, as the murder plot unfolds. One priest has his throat cut while in a confession booth, another has his head bashed in with a heavy blunt object. Joanna's doctor warns her that she has a bad heart and that she shouldn't allow herself to get overly agitated nor too aroused during sex. Joanna begins to experience hallucinations in which she sees a leering priest stalking her while holding a bloody doll in his hands.

== Cast ==
- David Warbeck as Craig
- Christina Nagy as Joanna
- Carroll Blumenberg as Ruth
- Rossano Brazzi as Dr. Sernich
- Andrea Bosic as Father Peter Farlow
- Loris Loddi as Father Davis
- Daniela De Carolis
- Rodolfo Ruzza
- Adriana Giuffrè

== Production ==
Formula for a Murder was filmed under the title Formula per un delitto. It was shot in Boston with interiors scenes done in Italy. Director Alberto De Martino stated he initially wanted to cast two young Italian actors: Valeria Golino and Nancy Brilli, but his casting choices were rejected by producer Fabrizio De Angelis. Both were replaced with American actors while the Golino and Brilli went on to have prominent careers in Italy. De Martino said that the films he made in the 1980s were all made for the foreign markets. These films were all made with a pseudonym of Martin Herbert as Martino said he felt "a little ashamed" of them.

De Martino described the film as his own variation on the film The Postman Always Rings Twice. Historians and critics Adrian Luther-Smith and Roberto Curti both pointed out that the film closer resembled the Hammer production Taste of Fear (1961) more. Historian Troy Howarth echoed this statement saying that the film "harkens back to the "women in peril" thrillers of the 1960s" and "does not enter into the excessive spirit of the other gialli of the period." The film was one of De Martino's final productions, as he retired from directing in the mid-1980s.

== Release ==
Formula for a Murder was released in 1985. In Italy, it was released as 7, Hyden Park – La casa maledetta. Film critic and historian Roberto Curti stated this title was more akin to being an "out-and-out horror film" like The Evil Dead (1981) which was released in Italy as La casa. De Martino was reportedly unhappy with the film, being constrained by an eighteen day shooting schedule. The film was released in Greece on home video as Formula For a Murder. It was released on DVD by Shameless Screen Entertainment.

== Reception ==
In a contemporary review from Corriere della Sera, the film is praised for its well conceived screenplay, but the second part of the film is criticized for its descent into grand guignol and its loss of tension, which reduces the film to a duel/game between victim and murderer. From retrospective reviews, in his book about Italian thriller films, Blood & Black Lace, Adrian Luther-Smith found the film to be an "enjoyably over-the-top exercise in grand guignol" and compared it to Luigi Russo's Dangerous Women, stating that the film "demonstrates how similarly themed material can be ruined by a static attitude." Curti stated in his book on Italian giallo that the film exposes its villain early at the half an hour mark and that David Warbeck "hams it up shamelessly" towards the third act, resembling a "Jack Nicholson-wannabe". In his book So Deadly, So Perverse on giallo, Troy Howarth stated that the film "not exactly loaded with surprises" while stating that the "murders are surprisingly brutal and bloody".
