= Street Law (film) =

- Italian film poster by Renato Casaro
- Directed by: Enzo G. Castellari
- Screenplay by: Massimo De Rita; Dino Maiuri
- Produced by: Mario Cecchi Gori
- Starring: Franco Nero; Giancarlo Prete; Barbara Bach; Renzo Palmer
- Cinematography: Carlo Carlini
- Edited by: Gianfranco Amicucci
- Music by: Guido & Maurizio De Angelis
- Production company: Capital Film
- Distributed by: Cineriz
- Release date: 17 September 1974 (Italy)
- Running time: 100 minutes
- Country: Italy
- Box office: ₤1.723 billion

Street Law (Italian: Il cittadino si ribella, lit. "The Citizen Rebels") is a 1974 poliziotteschi film. It stars Franco Nero, Barbara Bach and was directed by Enzo G. Castellari.

== Plot ==
Carlo Antonelli is an engineer from Genoa who is robbed, kidnapped and beaten during an armed bank robbery. After the police drop their investigation, he decides to find the gang and take justice into his own hands, with the help of a criminal who he blackmails to assist him.

== Cast ==
- Franco Nero as Carlo Antonelli
- Giancarlo Prete as Tommy
- Barbara Bach as Barbara
- Renzo Palmer as Inspector
- Nazzareno Zamperla as Beard
- Romano Puppo as Ringleader

== Production ==
The film was shot at Incir-De Paolis in Rome and on location in Genoa.

According to Castellari the producer, Mario Cecchi Gori, did not want him to shoot the opening sequence the way he wanted due to budget constraints. Castellari circumvented this by shooting a little every day without pay and without a shooting permit, by agreement with the stuntmen and crew.

== Releases ==
Street Law was released on 17 September 1974 in Italy, where it was distributed by and grossed 1,723,405,000 lire. The film's commercial success paved the way for the most critically panned subgenre of poliziotteschi, the vigilante film. Other vigilante films, such as Death Wish, had not yet been released in Italy.

The film was released in the United Kingdom under the title Vigilante II.

It has been issued on bluray in two incarnations.

== Footnotes ==
=== References ===
- Curti, Roberto (2013). Italian Crime Filmography, 1968-1980. McFarland. ISBN 978-0786469765.
