= Mark Gregory (actor) =

Italian actor

- Born: Marco De Gregorio; 2 May 1964; Rome, Italy
- Died: 31 January 2013 (aged 48); Castel Madama, Italy
- Occupation: Actor
- Years active: 1982–1989

Mark Gregory (born Marco De Gregorio, 2 May 1964 – 31 January 2013) was an Italian film actor. He was mostly associated with the 1980s post-apocalyptic era of science fiction-based action films.. Alongside Italian action star Michael Sopkiw, both shortly became the most-recognizable stars of the 1980s post-apocalyptic era of science fiction-based action films.

== Career ==
Gregory worked as a waiter, before being discovered in a gym in Rome. After his fiancée sent his picture to Fulvia Film, he was cast over some 2,000 candidates for the role of "Trash" in the 1982 science fiction thriller 1990: The Bronx Warriors, starring alongside Christopher Connelly and Fred Williamson. The film was heavily inspired by Mad Max 2 (1981) and The Warriors (1979). In the Italian movie Adam and Eve vs. the Cannibals (1983), he played the biblical character Adam. His dark looks resulted in him being cast as a vengeful Native American in the First Blood-inspired 1983 action film Thunder Warrior. He starred in the film Delta Force Commando (1988), starring again alongside Fred Williamson.

Gregory's last acting role was a starring role in Afghanistan – The Last War Bus (1989).

== Personal life ==
According to the working documents of his first film, 1990: The Bronx Warriors, Gregory was born Marco De Gregorio; for a long time, some sources reported his birth name incorrectly as Marco Di Gregorio. His father was a painter and sculptor. He grew up in the area of Porta Pia/Piazza Fiume in Rome. According to the same documentation, at the time of the shooting of 1990: The Bronx Warriors he was not 17 years old, as it was also commonly reported, but he had recently turned 18.

After Afghanistan – The Last War Bus, Gregory abandoned the film industry. According to one of his co-stars in that film, Bobby Rhodes, "At a certain point he (Mark Gregory) abhorred this (film) environment and withdrew ... like that, suddenly. Now he is a painter and a madonnaro. I don't know what disappointed him and pushed him to cut everything drastically; but one thing is certain: he doesn't want to know anything more about cinema. Strange, because Marco gave up just when he was at the height of his success, when he was starting to get paid well ..."

=== Final years and death ===
After Gregory's acting career ceased, he became a painter. In 2004, Gregory was reportedly the victim of a scam that led him to lose his house and everything he possessed. Afterwards, he moved to Castel Madama, a township 30 km (19 mi) east of Rome, but always struggled with financial and psychological problems. On January 31, 2013, he took his own life via an overdose of psychotropic drugs mixed with boiled water at 48. Fans had for years been looking for Gregory after he vanished from the film industry. In March 2022, Roberto Zanni, an author for the Italian Cinema Database, published an article that detailed how Gregory had died by suicide, with his grave being located in the cemetery in the Rome borough of Castel Madama.

== Filmography ==
Year	Title	Role	Notes
1982	1990: The Bronx Warriors	Trash	
1983	Adam and Eve: The First Love Story	Adam	
1983	Escape from the Bronx	Trash	
1983	Thunder Warrior	Luis "Thunder" Martinez	
1987	Thunder Warrior II	Luis "Thunder" Martinez	
1988	Thunder Warrior III	Luis "Thunder" Martinez	
1988	Delta Force Commando		
1988	Ten Zan: The Ultimate Mission	Jason	
1988	Un maledetto soldato	Mark	
1989	Afghanistan – The Last War Bus	Johnny Hondo	
