= Thunder Warrior II =

Thunder Warrior 2
- Theatrical release poster
- Directed by: Fabrizio De Angelis
- Screenplay by: David Parker Jr.; Fabrizio De Angelis
- Starring: Mark Gregory; Bo Svenson; Raimund Harmstorf; Karen Reel
- Cinematography: Sergio D'Offizi
- Edited by: Albert Moryalty
- Music by: Walter Rizzati
- Production company: Fulvia Films International
- Release date: March 1987 (West Germany)
- Country: Italy

Thunder Warrior II (Italian: Thunder 2) is an Italian action film written and directed by Fabrizio De Angelis. It is the sequel to the film Thunder Warrior. The film is about a native American sheriff named Thunder, who is transferred to a small town in the desert, and finds out collusion between organised criminals and corrupt officials.

== Cast ==
- Mark Gregory as Deputy Luis 'Thunder' Martinez
- Karen Reel as Sheela
- Raimund Harmstorf as Deputy Rusty Weissner
- Bo Svenson as The Sheriff Roger
- William Rice as Thomas Rupert

== Release ==
Thunder 2 was released on home video in West Germany in March 1987.

== Reception ==
From contemporary reviews, a review in the German film almanac Fischer Film Almnach declared that the film had more action and slow motion shots than the first film, but it just as much poor quality direction, script and acting. A reviewer credited as "Lor." of Variety reviewed the film on Trans World Entertainment video cassette on June 9, 1987. "Lor." described the film as "photogenic if uneventful sequel" noting that Monument Valley was a "lovely backdrop for this nonsense, rendered a bit hard to take by the pidgin English dialog".
