= Mario Costa =

Mario Costa may refer to:

- Mario Costa (philosopher) (1936–2023), Italian philosopher
- Mario Costa (director) (1904–1995)
- Mário Costa (born 1985), Portuguese cyclist
- Mário Costa Barberena (1934–2013), Brazilian politician
- Mario Pasquale Costa (1858–1933), Italian composer
- Mário Teixeira Costa (born 1970), Portuguese footballer
