= Fabrizio De Angelis =

Italian director, screenwriter and producer

- Other name: Larry Ludman
- Occupations: Director, screenwriter, producer

Fabrizio De Angelis is an Italian director, screenwriter and producer.

== Life and career ==
Fabrizio De Angelis was born in Rome, Italy on November 15, 1940. De Angelis produced a number of genre films for other directors such as those of Joe D'Amato's Emanuelle series, Lucio Fulci's horror films and Enzo G. Castellari's action films. His production companies were Fulvia Film, Fulvia Cinematografica, and DEAF International Films. He often worked under the name Larry Ludman.

== Selected filmography ==
Title	Year	Credited as				Notes	Ref(s)
Title	Year	Director	Screenwriter	Producer	Other	Notes	Ref(s)
Violent Rome	1975				Yes	Production manager	
Violent Naples	1976			Yes			
Emanuelle Around the World	1977			Yes			
Zombi 2	1979			Yes			
Day of the Cobra	1980				Yes	Executive producer	
The Beyond	1981			Yes			
The House by the Cemetery	1981			Yes			
The New York Ripper	1982			Yes			
Manhattan Baby	1982			Yes			
1990: The Bronx Warriors	1982			Yes			
The New Barbarians	1983			Yes			
Formula for a Murder	1985			Yes			
Operation Nam	1986	Yes	Yes	Yes	Yes	Screen story writer	
Thunder Warrior II	1987	Yes	Yes		Yes	Screen story writer	
Paganini Horror	1989			Yes			
Zombie Holocaust	—N/a				Yes	Screen story writer	
Thunder Warrior	—N/a	Yes	Yes				
Impatto mortale	—N/a	Yes	Yes				
Man Hunt	—N/a	Yes	Yes				
Colpo di Stato	—N/a	Yes	Yes		Yes	Screen story writer, set designer	
Karate Warrior	—N/a	Yes	Yes		Yes	Screen story writer	
Il ragazzo dal kimono d'oro 2	—N/a	Yes	Yes		Yes	Screen story writer	
Killer Crocodile	—N/a	Yes	Yes		Yes	Screen story writer	

== Notes ==
=== References ===
- Curti, Roberto (2013). Italian Crime Filmography, 1968-1980. McFarland. ISBN 978-0786469765.
- Curti, Roberto (2019). Italian Gothic Horror Films, 1980-1989. McFarland. ISBN 978-1476672434.
- Curti, Roberto (2022). Italian Giallo in Film and Television. McFarland. ISBN 978-1-4766-8248-8.
- Howarth, Troy (2015). Splintered Visions: Lucio Fulci and His Films. Midnight Marquee Press, Inc. ISBN 978-1936168538.
- Paul, Louis (2005). Italian Horror Film Directors. McFarland & Company. ISBN 978-0-7864-6113-4.
- Shipka, Danny (2011). Perverse Titillation: The Exploitation Cinema of Italy, Spain and France, 1960–1980. McFarland. ISBN 978-0-7864-4888-3.
- Willis, Donald, ed. (1985). Variety's Complete Science Fiction Reviews. Garland Publishing Inc. ISBN 978-0-8240-6263-7.
