= Raimund Harmstorf =

German actor (1939–1998)

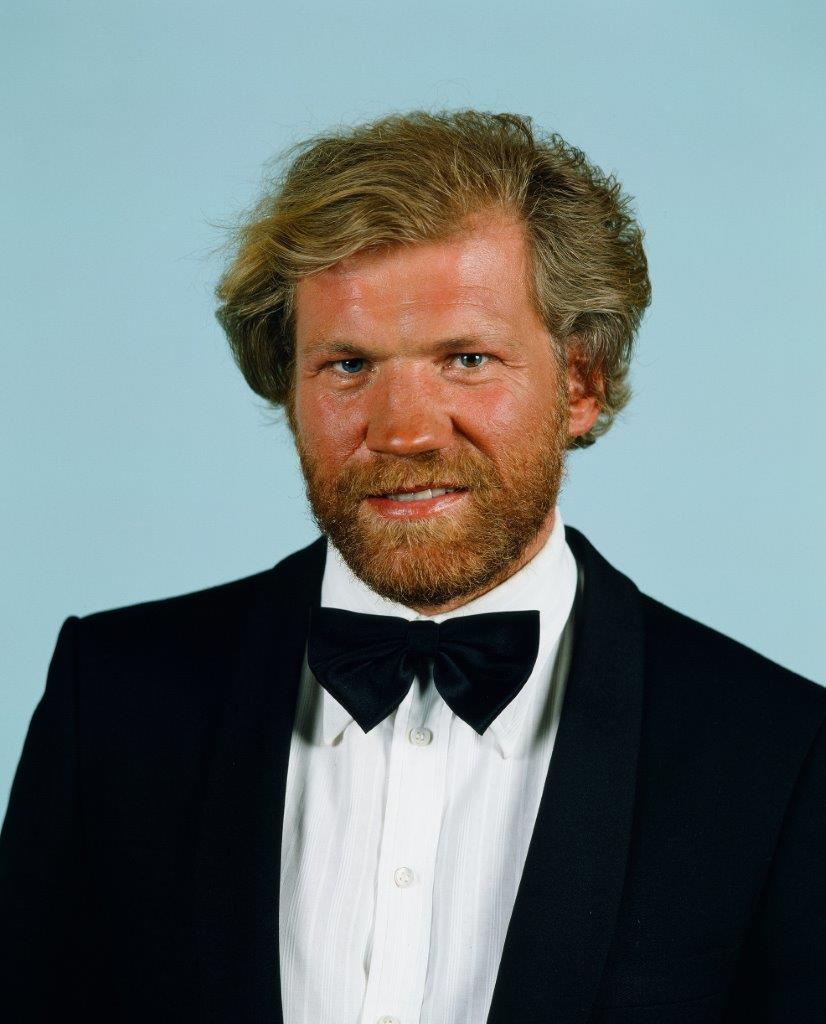
- Born: 7 October 1939; Hamburg, Germany
- Died: 3 May 1998 (aged 58); Marktoberdorf, Germany
- Occupation: Actor

Raimund Harmstorf (7 October 1939 – 3 May 1998) was a German actor. He became famous as the protagonist of a German TV mini series based on Jack London's the Sea-Wolf (which was sold into many countries) and starred later on successfully in another German TV series based on Jules Verne's Michael Strogoff.

== Early life and education ==
Harmstorf was the son of a doctor from Hamburg. He started a sports career and soon became a regional master of the decathlon. He then studied medicine, later music and performing arts.

== Career ==
From the beginning of the 1960s he started performing in smaller TV productions. His breakthrough was in 1971 with the TV series Der Seewolf, based on Jack London's novel The Sea-Wolf, where he played the evil-minded Captain Larsen. In one iconic scene, Harmstorf crushed a potato in his hand. (To make this possible, the potato had been cooked before the scene was filmed.)

Later he played in several spaghetti westerns along with Bud Spencer, Franco Nero and Charlton Heston. Over the years, his roles got smaller, and he suffered a series of injuries, including being shot in the foot while filming one of the westerns.

== Death ==
Toward the end of his career he was affected by Parkinson's disease. He feared his fans seeing him weakened and tried to keep up the appearance of a famously strong character he played by taking very large doses of anti-Parkinson's medications to suppress visible symptoms whenever he had to leave the house. The medication side effects landed him in the hospital for a few weeks in April 1998. After he was discharged from the hospital, his illness and vulnerability were greatly exploited by the tabloids. Bild ran an article on 2 May 1998 saying he had been in the hospital, which was true, but also publishing false claims, such as that he had stabbed himself. Reporters repeatedly attempted to contact him in person and by phone that day, and the popular TV channel RTL Television publicized the story in Bild that evening. He killed himself the next morning, on 3 May 1998, at the age of 58.

His suicide caused a scandal. German media were investigated; German police consequently stated that Harmstorf's suicide had been substantially promoted by certain articles. In particular Bild was blamed because Bild had already published Harmstorf's suicide on its main page the day before his actual death. Harmstorf's girlfriend confirmed that the actor had obviously been dismayed after he had read the Bild article.

== Filmography ==
The following is a selection of Harmstorf's roles in film:

- 1969: Donnerwetter! Donnerwetter! Bonifatius Kiesewetter - Stramm, Polizeileutnant
- 1971: The Long Swift Sword of Siegfried - Siegfried
- 1971: Der Seewolf (TV Mini-Series) - Wolf Larsen
- 1972: Semesterferien (TV Series) - Paul, ein Tramper
- 1972: Bloody Friday - Heinz Klett
- 1972: Cry of the Black Wolves - Jack Harper
- 1972: The Call of the Wild - Pete
- 1973: Der Seewolf - Wolf Larsen
- 1973: White Fang - Kurt Jansen
- 1974: Challenge to White Fang - Kurt Jansen
- 1975: Michel Strogoff (TV Mini-Series) - Michael Strogoff
- 1975: A Genius, Two Partners and a Dupe - Sergeant Milton
- 1975: Derrick (Season 2, Episode 5: "Zeichen der Gewalt") - Günter Hausmann
- 1976: Le Jeune Homme et le Lion - Widukind
- 1977: California - Rope Whittaker
- 1978: Mr. Mean - Rommell
- 1978: The Inglorious Bastards - German soldier Adolf Sachs
- 1978: They Called Him Bulldozer - Sergeant Kempfer
- 1979: Goetz von Berlichingen of the Iron Hand - Götz von Berlichingen
- 1979: The Sheriff and the Satellite Kid - Capt. Briggs
- 1979: Derrick (Season 6, Episode 6: "Tandem") - Rudolf Nolde
- 1980: L'Empreinte des géants - Jo Hansen
- 1980: Why the UFOs Steal Our Lettuce - Schiffskapitän
- 1983: S.A.S. à San Salvador - Enrique Chacon
- 1983: Deep Water (TV film) - Anton Kameter
- 1983: Thunder Warrior - Deputy Barry Henson
- 1984: Man Hunt - Robson
- 1985: Das Wunder - Raphaela's Father
- 1986: Geld oder Leber! - Kapitän der 'Klagenfurt'
- 1987: Thunder Warrior II - Deputy Rusty Weissner
- 1987–1988: The Black Forest Clinic (TV Series) - Cousin Florian
- 1990: Café Europa - Mr. Whiteman
- 1992–1994: African Skies (TV series) - Raimund
- 1995: The Viking Sagas - Valgard
- 1996: The Wolves - King
- 1997: Blutrausch - Profi
