= Bo Svenson =

Swedish-American actor

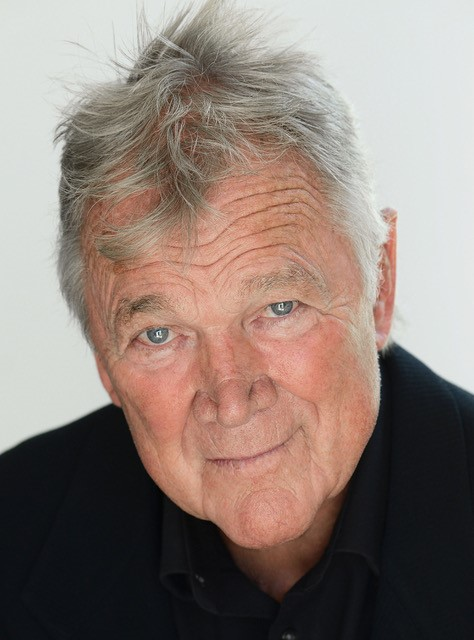
- Svenson in 2023
- Born: 13 February 1941 (age 85); Gothenburg, Sweden
- Occupations: Actor, film director, film producer, screenwriter
- Years active: 1965–present
- Spouse: Lise Svenson (m. 1966)
- Children: 3
- Website: www.bosvenson.com

Bo Svenson (born 13 February 1941) is a Swedish-American actor, director, producer, and screenwriter, known for his roles in American genre films of the 1970s and 1980s.

== Early life ==
Svenson was born in Sweden, the son of Birger Ragnar Svensson (1917–?), an athlete and the personal driver and bodyguard for the King of Sweden, and musician/big band leader Iris Viola "Lola" Svensson (1912–1998).

Svenson immigrated to the United States when he was 17, joined the United States Marine Corps, and served until his honorable discharge six years later. After his military service, Svenson settled in Florida, where he earned his living in various jobs, including professional race car driver. His first state of residence in the United States was Georgia, where he became familiar with the rural Southern accent he later employed in some of his roles. He has since become a naturalized United States citizen.

He also holds a fourth degree (Yondan) black belt in judo. He earned his first degree (Shodan) belt at Kodokan in Japan, the home dojo of Judo, while stationed in Japan in 1961 as a Marine. He was the 1961 Far East Judo Champion in the Heavyweight Division.

== Career ==
In the late 1960s, Svenson had a recurring role in the TV series Here Come the Brides as Lumberjack Olaf "Big Swede" Gustavsen. He appeared in the 1973 made-for-TV movie Frankenstein, in which he plays the "Creature".

One of his first big-screen movie roles was opposite Robert Redford in The Great Waldo Pepper, where Redford and Svenson play rival ex-WWI U.S. Army Air Service pilots who are now employed in the hard and dangerous but wildly adventurous lives of 1920s barnstorming pilots, touring the Midwest.

In his next pursuit, Svenson took over the role of lawman Buford Pusser from Joe Don Baker in both sequels to the hit 1973 film Walking Tall, after Pusser himself, who had originally agreed to take over the role, died in an automobile crash. He reprised the role again for the short-lived 1981 television series of the same title.

One of his most famous roles in films was as murder-witness-turned-vigilante Michael McBain in the 1976 cult classic Breaking Point. He played the Soviet agent Ivan in the Magnum, P.I. episode "Did You See the Sunrise?" (1982) and many years later had a cameo as an American colonel in Inglourious Basterds, as a tribute to his role in The Inglorious Bastards; he is the only actor to appear in both films.

Svenson got name-checked by Breaking Bad's Mike Ehrmantraut.

=== Work with Fred Williamson ===
Svenson has co-starred in a number of films with Fred Williamson. They include, The Inglorious Bastards (1978), Deadly Impact (1984), Delta Force Commando (1987), The Kill Reflex (1989), Three Days to a Kill (1991), and Steele's Law (1991)

== Outside acting ==
Svenson maintains an active role in the entertainment industry and is the Founder and CEO of MagicQuest Entertainment, a Hollywood production company since 1975, and Founder and CEO of CanAm Film Corp., a British Columbia corporation since 1992.

== Filmography ==
=== Actor ===
Film
| Year | Title | Role |
|---|---|---|
| 1973 | Maurie | Jack Twyman |
| 1974 | The Great Waldo Pepper | Axel Olsson |
| 1975 | Walking Tall Part 2 | Buford Pusser |
| 1976 | Breaking Point | Michael McBain |
| 1976 | Special Delivery | Jack Murdock |
| 1977 | The Son of the Sheik | Hamilton Burger |
| 1977 | Walking Tall: Final Chapter | Buford Pusser |
| 1977 | Snowbeast | Gar Seberg |
| 1978 | The Inglorious Bastards | Lieutenant Robert Yeager |
| 1979 | Portrait of a Hitman | Dr. Bob Michaels |
| 1979 | North Dallas Forty | Jo Bob Priddy |
| 1980 | Virus | Major Carter |
| 1982 | Night Warning | Detective Joe Carlson |
| 1983 | Thunder | Sheriff Bill Cook |
| 1984 | Deadly Impact | George Ryan |
| 1984 | The Manhunt | Sheriff |
| 1985 | Wizards of the Lost Kingdom | Kor |
| 1986 | The Delta Force | Captain Campbell |
| 1986 | Choke Canyon | Captain Oliver Parkside |
| 1986 | Armour of God | Monk |
| 1986 | Heartbreak Ridge | Roy Jennings, Palace Bar Owner |
| 1987 | Maniac Killer | Count Silvano |
| 1987 | Movie in Action | The Director |
| 1987 | Thunder II | Sheriff Roger |
| 1987 | Double Target | Colonel Galckin |
| 1987 | White Phantom | The Colonel |
| 1987 | Brothers in Blood | Steven Elliott Logan / Steel |
| 1987 | Delta Force Commando | Colonel Keitel |
| 1988 | Andy Colby's Incredible Adventure | Kor The Conqueror |
| 1988 | Deep Space | Captain Robertson |
| 1988 | Primal Rage | Ethridge |
| 1989 | Soda Cracker | Ivan Moss |
| 1989 | Curse II: The Bite | The Sheriff |
| 1989 | Beyond the Door III | Professor Andromolek |
| 1990 | Tides of War | SS Colonel |
| 1990 | Laser Mission | Colonel |
| 1991 | Critical Action | Ex-Con |
| 1991 | Steele's Law | Sheriff Barnes |
| 1992 | Three Days to a Kill | Rick |
| 1994 | Savage Land | Jeb |
| 1995 | Private Obsession | Sam Weston |
| 1995 | Steel Frontier | Colonel Roy Ackett |
| 1996 | Cheyenne | Captain Starrett |
| 1997 | Speed 2: Cruise Control | Captain Pollard |
| 1998 | Yukie | Richard |
| 2000 | Crackerjack 3 | Jack Thorn |
| 2001 | Outlaw | Detective Maize |
| 2004 | Legacy | Purse Snatcher |
| 2004 | Kill Bill: Volume 2 | Reverend Harmony |
| 2004 | Kill Bill: The Whole Bloody Affair | Reverend Harmony |
| 2005 | Hell to Pay | Del Shannon |
| 2006 | Raising Jeffrey Dahmer | Detective John Amos |
| 2008 | I Am Somebody: No Chance in Hell | Bo Foreman |
| 2009 | Inglourious Basterds | American Colonel |
| 2010 | The 7 Adventures of Sinbad | Simon Magnusson |
| 2010 | Angry | Bill |
| 2010 | Icarus | Vadim |
| 2014 | The Dependables | Mick Skinner |
| 2014 | Jersey Justice | W.W. Tolliver |
| 2019 | Finding Grace | Dr. Nelson |

Television
| Year | Title | Role | Notes |
|---|---|---|---|
| 1965 | Flipper | Harry Hobson | Episode: "Coral Fever" |
| 1967 | N.Y.P.D. | Actor | Episode: "Shakedown" |
| 1968 | Premiere | Milovan Drumm | Episode: "The Freebooters" |
| 1968 | Mission Impossible | Karl | Episode: "The Mercenaries" |
| 1968 | Here Comes the Brides | Big Swede | 10 episodes |
| 1968 | The Outcasts | Pardee | Episode: "The Heroes" |
| 1969 | Lancer | Josh | Episode: "The Wedding" |
| 1969 | The Name of the Game | G.B. Mosbie | Episode: "Love-In at Ground Zero" |
| 1969 | Daniel Boone | Haskins | Episode: "A Pinch of Salt" |
| 1969 | The High Chaparral | Bennett | Episode: "Trail to Nevermore" |
| 1969 | Ironside | Baron Lars Von Gyllenskjold | Episode: "Love My Enemy" |
| 1970 | The Virginian | Lonnie | Episode: "The Price of the Hanging" |
| 1970 | The Mod Squad | Bubba | Episode: "Welcome to the Human Race, Levi Frazee!" |
| 1971 | The Chicago Teddy Bears | Georgi | Episode: "Billy the Kid" |
| 1971 | McCloud | Charles 'Bubba' White | Episode: "Top of the World, Ma" |
| 1972 | The Bravos | Raeder | TV movie |
| 1972 | The Rookies | Bud Reeves | Episode: "The Commitment" |
| 1972 | Banyon | Carlo | Episode: "Meal Ticket" |
| 1973 | You'll Never See Me Again | Sam | TV movie |
| 1973 | Kung Fu | Pike | Episode: "The Spirit-Helper" |
| 1974 | The Snoop Sisters | Chet Marion | Episode: "Fear Is a Free-Throw" |
| 1975 | Target Risk | Lee Driscoll | TV movie |
| 1977 | Snowbeast | Gar Seberg | TV movie |
| 1978 | Battle of the Network Stars | Himself | Competitor with the CBS team |
| 1979 | Gold of the Amazon Women | Tom Jensen | TV movie |
| 1979 | The Spirit of Adventure: Night Flight | Fabien | TV movie |
| 1981 | Walking Tall | Sheriff Buford Pusser | 7 episodes |
| 1982 | Magnum, P.I. | Ivan | Episode: "Did You See the Sun Rise?" |
| 1983 | The Fall Guy | Colonel Baker | 2 episodes |
| 1984 | Jealousy | Ho Hutton | TV movie |
| 1984 | Hunter | Sheriff Jake Cutter | Episode: "A Long Way from L.A." |
| 1985 | Crazy like a Fox | Unknown | Episode: "Motor Homicide" |
| 1987 | The Dirty Dozen: The Deadly Mission | Maurice Fontenac | TV movie |
| 1988 | Murder, She Wrote | Karl Anderson | 2 episodes |
| 1993 | Neon Rider | Maitland | Episode: "Walking Tall" |
| 1993 | Street Justice | Captain Stryker | Episode: "Countdown" |
| 1993 | The Commish | George Hayes | Episode: "Hero" |
| 1994 | Lonesome Dove: The Series | Colonel Jeb Quintano | Episode: "Last Stand" |
| 1994 | Cobra | Frank McLory | Episode: "Death Dive" |
| 1994 | Kung Fu: The Legend Continues | Ben Kinasay | Episode: "Only the Strong Survive" |
| 1995 | Pointman | Uncle Nick | Episode: "Going Home" |
| 1997 | Heartless | Sheriff Sam | TV movie |
| 1998 | Dead Man's Gun | Colonel Horace Buckthorn | Episode: "The Mimsers" |
| 1998 | Due South | Holloway Muldoon | 2 episodes |
| 2002 | JAG | Captain Mikhail Yerastov | Episodes: "Defending His Honor" and "Enemy Below" |
| 2004 | I'll Be Seeing You | Philip Carter | TV movie |
| 2004 | Proof of the Man | Ken Shuftan | TV mini-series |
| 2012 | Arne Dahl: Bad Blood | Daniel Brink | TV movie |

=== Director ===
| Year | Title |
|---|---|
| 1996 | The Road Home |
| 1996–1998 | Kung Fu: The Legend Continues |
| 1998 | He's Not Heavy |
| 2001 | Outlaw |
| 2004 | Legacy |

=== Producer ===
| Year | Title | Notes |
|---|---|---|
| 1998 | Yukie | Co-producer |
| 2004 | Legacy | Producer |
| 2006 | Raising Jeffrey Dahmer | Co-producer |

=== Writer ===
| Year | Title |
|---|---|
| 2001 | Outlaw |
| 2004 | Legacy |
