= Day of the Cobra =

- Italian film poster
- Italian: Il giorno del Cobra
- Directed by: Enzo G. Castellari
- Screenplay by: Aldo Lado; Fabio Carpi; Tito Carpi
- Story by: Aldo Lado
- Produced by: Turi Vasile
- Starring: Franco Nero; Sybil Danning; Mario Maranzana
- Cinematography: Giovanni Bergamini
- Edited by: Gianfranco Amicucci
- Music by: Paolo Vasile
- Production company: Laser Cinematografica
- Release date: 12 August 1980
- Running time: 95 minutes
- Country: Italy
- Box office: ₤489 million

Day of the Cobra (Italian: Il giorno del Cobra) is a 1980 Italian poliziottesco film directed by Enzo G. Castellari, and starring Franco Nero and Sybil Danning. It was released on 12 August 1980.

== Plot ==
Larry Stanziani, nicknamed "The Cobra", is an ex-drug enforcement agent who lost his career after being framed. Now working in San Francisco as a private investigator, his former superior offers him a chance at redemption: travel to his old hometown Genoa to investigate Kandinsky, his old adversary. In the process, Stanziani reconnects with his young son Tim, who was left behind at a boarding school after his wife's death.

== Cast ==
- Franco Nero as Larry "The Cobra" Stanzani
- Sybil Danning as Brenda
- Mario Maranzana as Davide Cases
- William Berger as Jack Goldsmith
- Licinia Lentini as Lola Alberti
- Enio Girolami as Mastino
- Mickey Knox as Raoul Papasian
- Massimo Vanni as Beltrame
- Carlo Gabriel Nero as Tim Stanzani
- Romano Puppo as Silvestri
- Michele Soavi as Sergei Kandinsky
- Claudio Pacifico as Ivan Radovic
- Sasha D'Arc as Hitman
- Stefania Girolami Goodwin as Papasian's Secretary

== Production ==
Director Enzo G. Castellari initially approached Vasile with a script written by Vasile's son. The boxing film project was shelved and Vasile offered Castellari to direct Day of the Cobra. Day of the Cobra was written by Aldo Lado who was initially going to direct the film. Lado's story was initially set right after World War II in Trieste. Castellari's film is set in the present day and he imagined the film a "homage to Chandler.

Castellari cast many actors who he had previously worked with, including Franco Nero and Massimo Vanni. He also cast some of his family members such as his brother Ennio Girolami and daughter Stefania.

Day of the Cobra was shot on location in Genoa, San Francisco, and at Incir-De Paolis Studios in Rome.

== Release ==
Day of the Cobra was released on August 12, 1980. The film grossed a total of 489,000,000 Italian lira on its domestic release. The score of the film was by Paolo Vasile which was released by Cinevox.

== Reception ==
According to the German book Der Terror führt Regie: "Day of the Cobra is technically pure cinema. The film suffers a bit in its pandering to American viewing habits."

Online film database AllMovie gave the film two stars out of five, stating that a "key flaw is the maddening story line, which manages to be over-complicated and half-baked all at once." and that "elements of the story simply rehash other, better thrillers, like The French Connection." The review noted that the film contains "a few worthwhile action set pieces. The rooftop chase that opens the film is quite exciting and there is also a memorably tongue-in-cheek scene where Nero dukes it out with a transvestite in an empty disco. However, the viewer must wade through a lot of clichés and dull passages to get to these moments"

A review for Basement of Ghouls Decadence reads, "The Day of the Cobra isn't a bad effort, but it's too pedestrian when compared to better Castellari/Nero colabs [sic]. The sheer passion and scope of the aforementioned High Crime or Keoma is replaced by a lingering desperation to be too Americanized by "safely" going through the paces."

== See also ==
- List of Italian films of 1980
- List of crime films of the 1980s
