= Sergio Salvati =

Italian cinematographer (1934–2025)

- Born: 16 June 1934; Rome, Italy
- Died: 17 September 2025 (aged 91); Rome, Italy
- Occupation: Cinematographer
- Years active: 1960–2025

Sergio Salvati (16 June 1934 – 17 September 2025) was an Italian cinematographer.

== Life and career ==
Salvati was born in Trastevere, a working-class neighborhood of Rome, Italy. His father, Aldofo Salvati, was already a key grip in the early days of Italian cinema, and through his father's contacts Sergio began his career developing negatives in a small photographic laboratory in Rome, the SPES directed by Di Ettore Catalucci.

In 1956, his father was working with Enzo Serafin, who asked Sergio to work with him as camera assistant on Raw Wind in Eden starring Esther Williams and Jeff Chandler. Many other films shot in Italy would follow, both cult classics and commercial cinema. He would be a camera assistant on Sergio Leone's The Good, the Bad, and the Ugly (1966) and later assistant to Ennio Guarnieri on three projects from the 1960s and 1970s: Pier Paolo Pasolini's Medea (1969), L'Invasion (1970) directed by Yves Allegret and Mauro Bolognini's Metello (1979).

During his career, Salvati would be director of photography for eleven films directed by Lucio Fulci, the Italian master of gore, including the famous Wax Mask taken over by Dario Argento when Fulci died during preparation of the film. He would also be cinematographer on several films produced by Charles Band, including Puppetmaster (1989). After having filmed scenes of Christian De Sica's remake of his father's film, Il Conte Max (1991), in Marrakesh, Sergio Salvati established the groundwork for a collaboration with the country of Morocco. He worked alongside his friend Ennio Guarnieri on two films from the TNT Bible series shot in Ouarzazate, the Hollywood of Morocco: Jacob (1994) and The Seventh Scroll (1999). At the age of 73, he was director of photography on an independent Moroccan film, The Return of the Son, directed by Ahmed Boulane.

He taught cinematography in film schools in both Ouarzazate and Casablanca. He also taught at the famous Centro Sperimentale Di Cinematografia in Rome and freely shared his experience with young filmmakers, as well as perpetuating the rich tradition of "Italian cinema". Salvati was president of the AIC, Associazione Italiana Autori della Fotografia, from 2007 through 2008 and remained on the board of directors.

Salvati died on 17 September 2025, at the age of 91.

== Partial filmography ==
Note: The films listed as N/A are not necessarily chronological.

Title	Year	Credited as			Notes	Ref(s)
Title	Year	Director of photography	Camera operator	Other	Notes	Ref(s)
La strega in amore	1966			Yes	Assistant cameraman	
My Name Is Nobody	1973	Yes			Uncredited	
Four of the Apocalypse	1975	Yes				
Dracula in the Provinces	1975	Yes				
Sette note in nero	1977	Yes				
Zombi 2	1979	Yes				
Dr. Jekyll Likes Them Hot	1979	Yes				
Contraband	1980	Yes				
City of the Living Dead	1980	Yes				
The Black Cat	1981	Yes				
The Beyond	1981	Yes				
The House by the Cemetery	1981	Yes				
1990: The Bronx Warriors	1982	Yes				
