= Enzo G. Castellari =

Italian film director

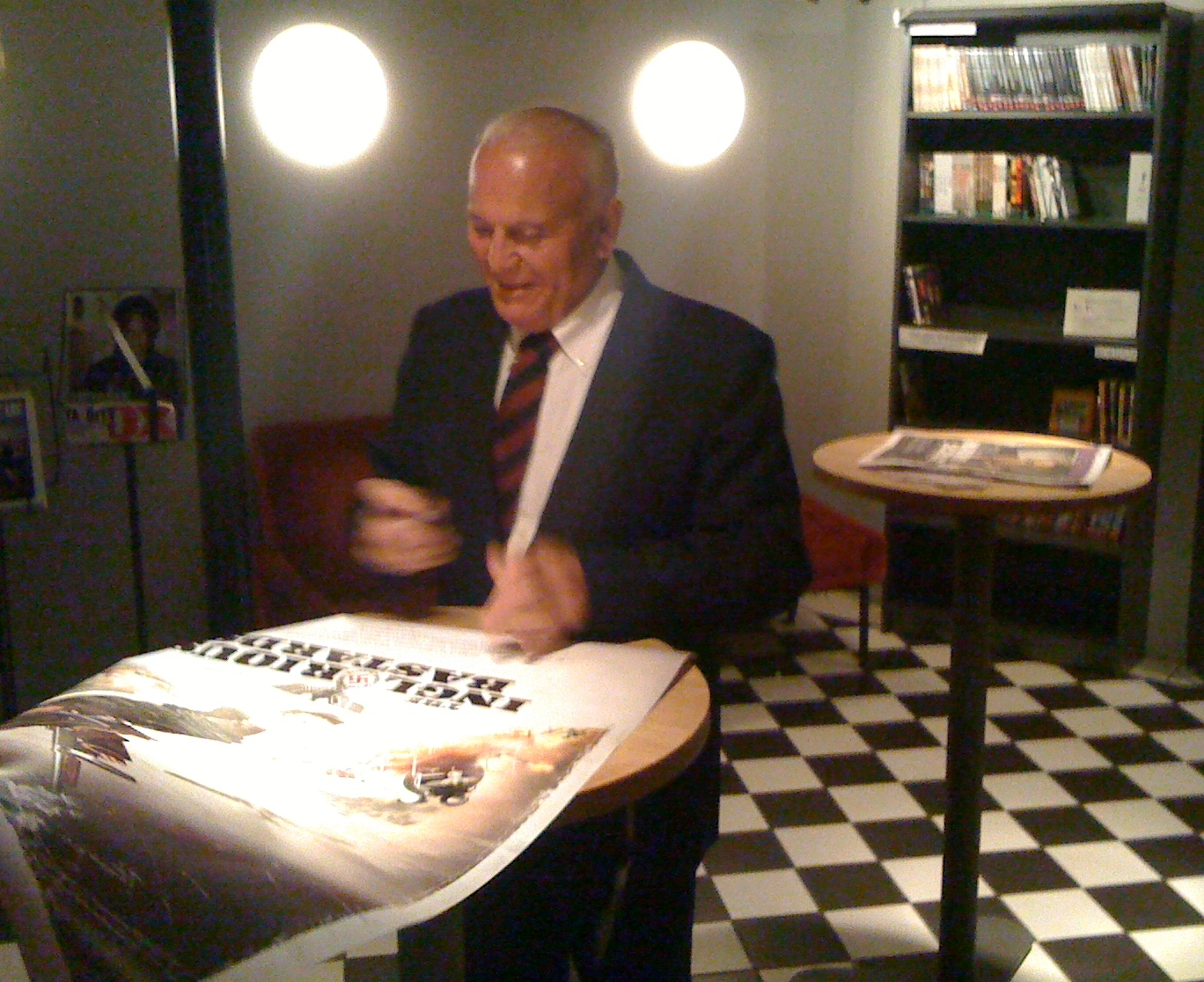
- Castellari signing The Inglorious Bastards posters at FFF (Lund International Fantastic Film Festival) in Lund, Sweden, 2009
- Born: Enzo Girolami; 29 July 1938 (age 88); Rome, Italy
- Occupations: Film director; screenwriter
- Years active: 1960–present

Signature
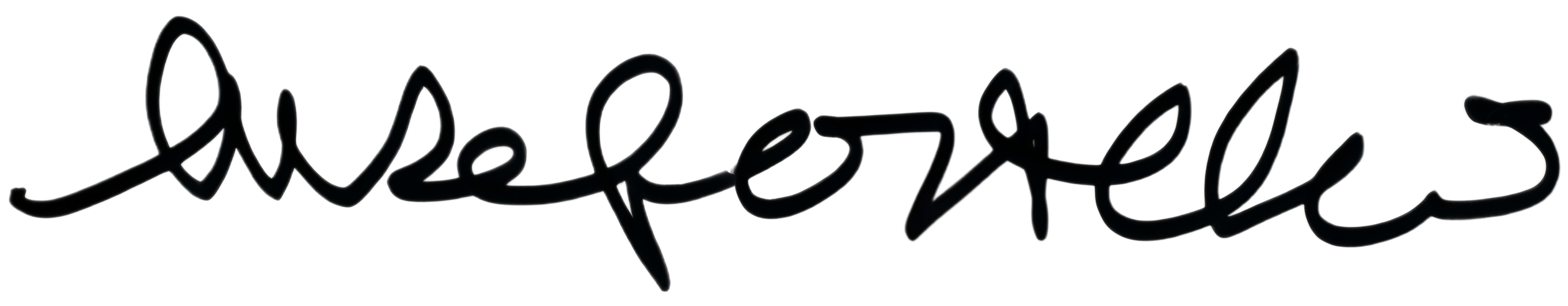

Enzo G. Castellari (né Enzo Girolami; born 29 July 1938) is an Italian film director, screenwriter and actor.

== Early life ==
Castellari was born in Rome into a family of filmmakers. His father was a boxer turned film maker Marino Girolami. His uncle is filmmaker Romolo Guerrieri and his brother was actor Ennio Girolami. He initially was a boxer like his father and went to school to get a degree in architecture.

== Career ==
Castellari began work on film assisting with various jobs on sets of his father's films. Among his early credits included uncredited roles in directing films such as Few Dollars for Django (1966) and A Ghentar si muore facile (1967). Many of Castellari's early works are Spaghetti Westerns. He received his official credited directorial debut with Renegade Riders (1967), a film shot in Spain and influenced by Sidney J. Furie's film The Appaloosa (1966). After releasing the Western Kill Them All and Come Back Alone (1968), Castellari did a Macaroni war film titled Eagles Over London.

By the early 1970s, Castellari began exploring other genres as well such as the thriller Cold Eyes of Fear (1971), the comedy Hector the Mighty (1972), and the comedic swashbuckler The Loves and Times of Scaramouche (1976). He directed his first poliziotteschi film with High Crime starring Franco Nero. Nero and Castellari formed a relationship with the film and work together for seven features.

Castellari later noted his work with Nero, stating "I think that to have an actor like Franco Nero is one of the best things that can happen to a director...if it had been possible, I would have made all my films with him" Nero would work with Castellari on the Western Keoma which was only a mild success in Italy on its release, but would later be praised as one of Castellari's best films. Castellari created further poliziotteschi films in the late 1970s as well as the war film The Inglorious Bastards. Castellari was offered to direct the film Zombi 2, but turned it down as he did not feel he would be the right director for a horror film.

In the 1980s the popularity of the poliziotteschi faltered and Castellari's film Day of the Cobra with Franco Nero was not popular in the box office. Castellari followed it up with The Last Shark, a film about a small beach town terrorized by a bloodthirsty great white shark. The film was withdrawn from theaters after Universal Studios sued the production for being too similar to the film Jaws. Castellari next film 1990: The Bronx Warriors was a surprise hit that created a small wave of films from Italy inspired by the John Carpenter film Escape from New York. The mid-to-late 1980s work for Castellari was work made for foreign markets such as Light Blast (1985), Striker and Sinbad of the Seven Seas.

In the 1990s, Castellari's work was mostly dedicated to made-for-television productions. Castellari made a comeback film in 2010 with Caribbean Basterds, a film which received a theatrical release in Italy which was a rarity for locally made genre films at the time. Castellari cameoed as a German mortar squad commander in The Inglorious Bastards, and Quentin Tarantino cast Castellari in the cameo role of a German general in his film Inglourious Basterds (2009), which was inspired by Castellari's 1978 film.

In October 2014, Castellari was awarded at the Almería Western Film Festival.

In 2025, Castellari was honoured at the 58th Sitges Film Festival with the Time Machine Award (The Màquina del Temps).

== Filmography ==
Title	Year	Credited as				Notes	Ref(s)
Title	Year	Director	Writer	Producer	Other	Notes	Ref(s)
Renegade Riders	1966	Yes	Yes	Yes		Credited as E.G. Rowland	
Any Gun Can Play	1967	Yes	Yes				
One Dollar Too Many	1968	Yes					
Johnny Hamlet	1968	Yes	Yes				
Kill Them All and Come Back Alone	1968	Yes	Yes				
Eagles Over London	1969	Yes	Yes				
Cold Eyes of Fear	1970	Yes	Yes				
Hector the Mighty	1971	Yes	Yes				
Sting of the West	1972	Yes					
High Crime	1973	Yes	Yes			Reporter	
Street Law	1974	Yes					
Cry, Onion!	1975	Yes				Mexican in the market	
The Loves and Times of Scaramouche	1975	Yes	Yes				
Keoma	1976	Yes	Yes				
The Big Racket	1976	Yes	Yes			Cowardly Storekeeper	
The Heroin Busters	1978	Yes	Yes				
The Inglorious Bastards	1977	Yes				German Officer	
The House by the Edge of the Lake	1979	Yes					
The Shark Hunter	1979	Yes				Il killer	
Day of the Cobra	1980	Yes				Warehouse Thug	
The Last Shark	1981	Yes					
1990: The Bronx Warriors	1982	Yes	Yes			Vice President (daughter Stefania Girolami was Ann)	
The New Barbarians	1982	Yes	Yes			Credited as Enzo Girolami	
Escape from the Bronx	1983	Yes	Yes			Radio Operator	
Tuareg – The Desert Warrior	1984	Yes	Yes			Prison Guard	
Light Blast	1985	Yes	Yes				
Hammerhead	1987	Yes	Yes				
Jonathan of the Bears	1994	Yes	Yes				
Caribbean Basterds	2010	Yes					

== Bibliography ==
- Curti, Roberto (2013). Italian Crime Filmography, 1968–1980. McFarland. ISBN 9780786469765.
