= To Catch a Spy (disambiguation) =

To Catch a Spy is a 1971 comedy film starring Kirk Douglas.

To Catch a Spy may also refer to:

- To Catch a Spy (1957 film), the English title for Action immédiate
- To Catch a Spy, 2002 novel by Stuart M. Kaminsky
- "To Catch a Spy" (The Secret Service), episode in children's TV series
- To Catch a Spy, a 2021 Hallmark Movies & Mysteries television movie starring Colin Donnell.
