= Catch Me a Spy =

1969 novel by George Marton and Tibor Meray

- First US edition
- Author: George Marton; Tibor Meray
- Language: English
- Genre: Spy
- Publisher: W. H. Allen & Co. (UK); Harper & Row (US)
- Publication date: 1969
- Publication place: United Kingdom
- Media type: Print

Catch Me a Spy is a 1969 comedy spy thriller novel by George Marton and Tibor Meray.

== Adaptation ==
In 1971 it was turned into the film To Catch a Spy, also released as Catch Me a Spy, starring Kirk Douglas, Marlène Jobert and Trevor Howard.

== Bibliography ==
- Goble, Alan. The Complete Index to Literary Sources in Film. Walter de Gruyter, 1999.
