= Masculin Féminin =

1966 film by Jean-Luc Godard

Male Female: 15 Specific Events
- Theatrical release poster
- Directed by: Jean-Luc Godard
- Written by: Jean-Luc Godard
- Produced by: Anatole Dauman
- Starring: Chantal Goya; Jean-Pierre Léaud
- Cinematography: Willy Kurant
- Edited by: Agnès Guillemot
- Music by: Jean-Jacques Debout
- Production companies: Anouchka Films; Argos Films; Svensk Filmindustri; Sandrews
- Distributed by: Columbia Films (France); Sandrew Film & Teater AB (Sweden)
- Release dates: 22 March 1966 (France); 14 September 1966 (Sweden)
- Running time: 103 minutes
- Countries: France; Sweden
- Language: French
- Box office: 427,430 admissions (France)

Masculin féminin: 15 Specific Events (French: Masculin féminin: 15 faits précis, pronounced [maskylɛ̃ feminɛ̃ kɛ̃z fe pʁesi]) is a 1966 French New Wave film, written and directed by Jean-Luc Godard. An international co-production between France and Sweden, the film stars Chantal Goya, Jean-Pierre Léaud, Marlène Jobert, Catherine-Isabelle Duport and Michel Debord.

Léaud plays Paul, a romantic young idealist who chases budding pop star Madeleine (played by Goya, a real-life yé-yé singer). Despite markedly different musical tastes and political leanings, the two soon become romantically involved and begin a ménage à quatre with Madeleine's two roommates, Catherine (Duport) and Elisabeth (Jobert). The camera probes the young actors in a series of vérité-style interviews about love, sex, and politics. At times the main story is interrupted by various sequences and subplots, including a scene paraphrased from LeRoi Jones' play Dutchman.

Masculin Féminin was intended as a representation of 1960s France and Paris. The film contains references to various pop culture icons and political figures of the time, such as Charles de Gaulle, André Malraux, James Bond, and Bob Dylan. Arguably the most famous quotation from the film is "This film could be called The Children of Marx and Coca-Cola", which is actually an intertitle between chapters.

Masculin Feminin was met with critical acclaim and was featured at the 16th annual Berlin International Film Festival.

== Plot ==
Paul, a young idealist who recently fulfilled his military service, is looking for a job. In a café, he meets Madeleine Zimmer, a young singer who wishes to make a record. They witness a woman having an argument with her partner, which culminates in the woman drawing a gun and shooting him. Paul goes to meet with his friend Robert Packard, a journalist who has Paul sign a petition to free a group of artists and writers in Rio de Janeiro accused of voicing their opposition to state policy.

Paul begins working for a magazine. In a bathroom, Paul confronts Madeleine, saying that she promised him that they would go out that night. She asks him if "going out" means "going to bed", and he falls silent. She tells him that her promise was a lie. As the French presidential election of December 1965 approaches, Paul turns 21 years old and becomes romantically involved with Madeleine. Madeleine introduces him to her roommate Elisabeth Choquet. Also present is Catherine-Isabelle, whom Robert likes. Paul helps Robert put up posters around Paris and paint the phrase "Peace in Vietnam" along the side of a U.S. Army car. On a train, Paul and Robert witness a white woman and two black men antagonizing each other, which results in the woman firing a gun.

Madeleine is to have her first single released by RCA Records. On the day of its release, Paul brings her to the café and attempts to propose to her. Madeleine, anxious to see the release of her record, says they will discuss the matter later. Paul records a message for Madeleine in a coin-operated record booth. He is then approached by a man with a knife, who stabs himself. In a laundromat, Paul recounts to Robert his experience of feeling that he was being followed. Robert, reading a newspaper, tells Paul about Bob Dylan, who Robert says is a "Vietnik" (a portmanteau of "Vietnam" and "beatnik").

Paul starts living with Madeleine, Elisabeth and Catherine. He leaves his job at the magazine to become a pollster for IFOP. He interviews a young woman named Elsa, asking her about subjects such as politics, birth control and love. At the café, Paul tells Elisabeth that Madeleine is pregnant, but Elisabeth is skeptical. Madeleine arrives and sees the woman who shot her partner, now a prostitute. They also see a theatre director giving instructions to an actress. Paul, Madeleine, Elisabeth and Catherine go to a cinema to watch a film. During the screening, Madeleine tells Paul that she loves him. He leaves the cinema temporarily to spray-paint a slogan critical of Charles de Gaulle on a wall outside. Later, Robert has a conversation with Catherine, during which he asserts that she is in love with Paul. Godard, through Robert, constructs the idea of worker as a revolutionary and work as revolution.

One day, a man borrows a box of matches from Paul, and uses them to self-immolate, leaving behind a note that says "Peace in Vietnam". Paul and Catherine visit Madeleine in a recording studio, where she is recording a new song. She acts distant towards Paul, and after encountering a reporter, asks Paul to fetch a car for her. Paul calls the war ministry, and impersonating a military general, demands a car. One arrives, and he, Madeleine and Catherine depart the premises in it.

From January to March 1966, Paul continues conducting opinion polls about politics, love, and other topics. He determines that his lack of objectivity, even when unconscious, resulted in a lack of sincerity in the answers from the people he polled. At a police station, Catherine recounts to an officer that Paul purchased a high-rise apartment. Madeleine wanted to move Elisabeth in with them, which Paul opposed. Paul reportedly fell from a window, which Catherine asserts must have been an accident rather than a suicide. Madeleine, still pregnant, tells the officer that she is not sure what she will do next.

== Cast ==
- Chantal Goya as Madeleine Zimmer, a young singer
- Marlène Jobert as Elisabeth Choquet, Madeleine's roommate
- Catherine-Isabelle Duport as Catherine-Isabelle, Madeleine's other roommate
- Jean-Pierre Léaud as Paul, a romantic young idealist
- Michel Debord as Robert Packard, a journalist
- Yves Afonso as the man who dies by suicide by stabbing (uncredited)
- Elsa Leroy as "Mademoiselle 19 ans", a young French woman whom Paul interviews for an IFOP poll (uncredited)

Brigitte Bardot and Antoine Bourseiller make uncredited appearances as an actress and a director in the café. Françoise Hardy also makes an uncredited appearance as the wife of an American officer.

== Production ==
In 1965, Anatole Dauman, the head of Argos Films, wanted to re-edit and re-release Alexandre Astruc's 1952 44-minute film The Crimson Curtain. He decided that he also wanted another medium-length film to accompany Astruc's film and offered the project to Godard, suggesting that Godard adapt Guy de Maupassant's short story The Signal. Godard had been interested in filming The Signal for several years and agreed to the project. Eventually, Dauman suggested that Godard also adapt Maupassant's short story Paul's Mistress and secured the rights to both short stories. When filming began, Godard discarded both Maupassant short stories and Maupassant's publishers later agreed that the film was in no way an adaptation of the author's work. The only parts of either short stories that appear in the film is the fact that the main character's name is Paul and the "film within the film" that the main characters go to see at a cinema was initially inspired by The Signal.

Godard did not have a shooting script; instead he relied on a spiral notebook filled with ideas, sketches, and dialogue he had handwritten the previous evening. Godard was interested in working with singer Chantal Goya because she was neither a film nor stage actress when she was introduced to him by Daniel Filipacchi on 7 November 1965. Shooting began on November 22, 1965. Godard used natural lighting and a minimal crew throughout the production.

== Reception ==
Due to the portrayal of youth and sex, the film was prohibited to persons under 18 in France—"the very audience it was meant for," griped Godard.

At the time of the film's release, French journalist Georges Sadoul praised the film's ability to speak to young people, while H. Chapier criticized the film for its sexual content but praised Léaud's performance. British critic Tom Milne called it Godard's "most complex film to date." American critic Pauline Kael said that it was "that rare achievement: a work of grace and beauty in a contemporary setting." Andrew Sarris called it "the film of the season." Judith Crist said that it had "flashes of original wit and contemporary perceptions." Bosley Crowther gave a negative review of the film and called it "entertainment of only the most loose and spotty sort."

The film has since garnered widespread critical acclaim and it is often cited as one of Godard's greatest works. On the review aggregator website Rotten Tomatoes, the film holds an approval rating of 96% based on 47 reviews, with an average rating of 8.4/10. The website's critics consensus reads, "A '60s time capsule stuffed with ideas about politics, pop culture, and the battle of the sexes, Masculine-Feminine is one of Godard's classic black-and-white films." Metacritic, which uses a weighted average, assigned the film a score of 93 out 100, based on 14 critics, indicating "universal acclaim".

The film was selected for screening as part of the Cannes Classics section of the 2016 Cannes Film Festival.

=== Accolades ===
At the 16th Berlin International Film Festival, the film won the award for Best Feature Film Suitable for Young People. Jean-Pierre Léaud won the Silver Bear for Best Actor for his performance in the film.

== See also ==
- List of French-language films
- Yé-yé
