= Catriona MacColl =

British actress (born 1954)

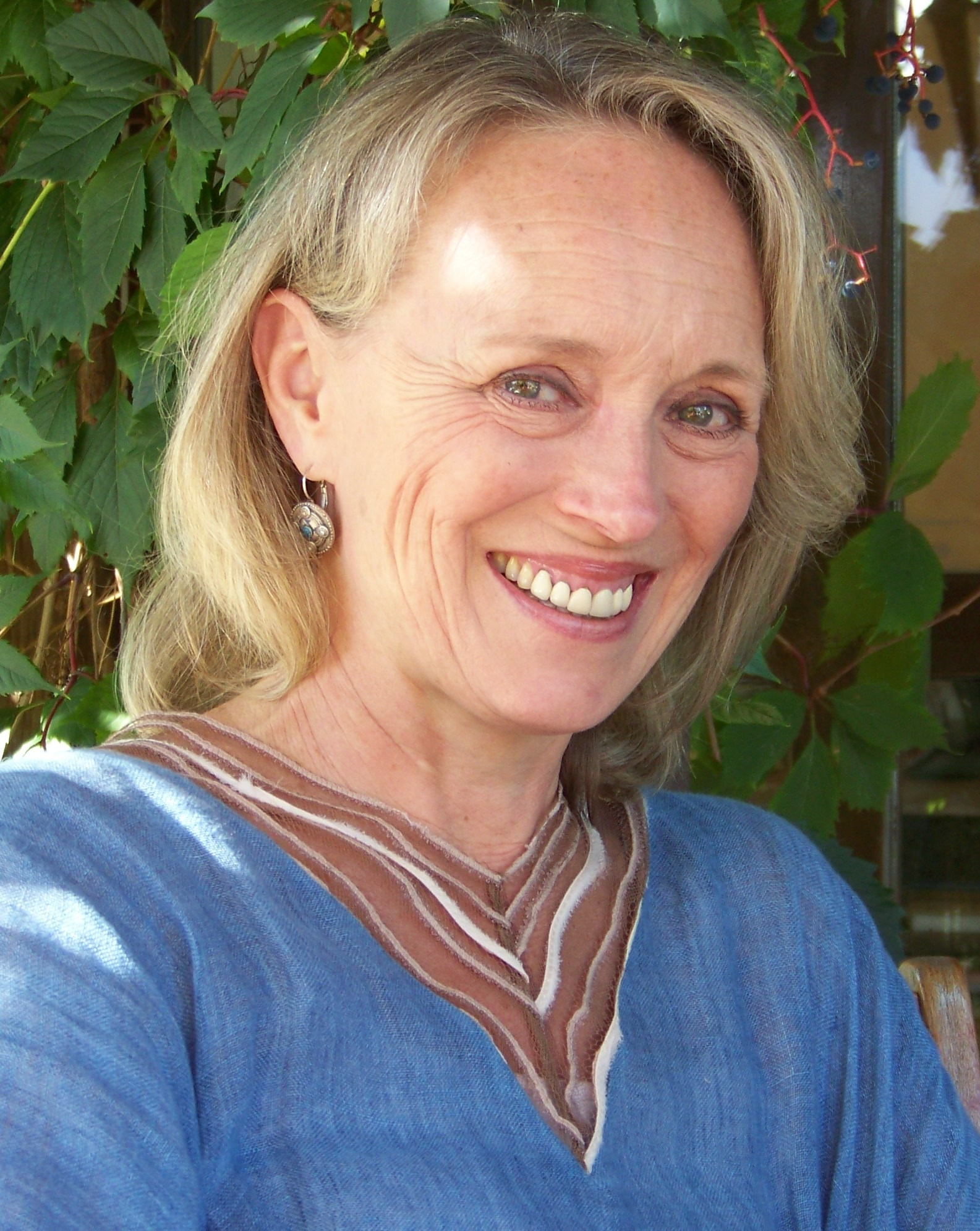
- MacColl in 2010
- Born: 3 October 1954 (age 71); London, England
- Other name: Katherine MacColl
- Education: Royal Ballet School
- Occupation: Actress
- Years active: 1978–present
- Known for: Gates of Hell trilogy
- Spouse: Jon Finch (m. 1982; div. 1987)

Catriona MacColl (born 3 October 1954), also credited as Katherine MacColl, is an English actress, who has worked extensively in both film and television across Europe.

She is perhaps best known for her work in Italian horror films, as she has appeared in Lucio Fulci's Gates of Hell trilogy; City of the Living Dead (1980), The Beyond (1981) and The House by the Cemetery (1981). She also portrayed the title role in Jacques Demy's Lady Oscar (1979), a live-action adaptation of the manga The Rose of Versailles.

== Early life ==
MacColl was born in London on 3 October 1954. In her youth, she trained professionally as a ballerina from the age of five, attending the Royal Ballet School. As a young adult, MacColl suffered a foot injury that prevented her from continuing her career path in dancing.

== Career ==
MacColl began her career in the late 1970s, making her debut in the French romantic drama Le Dernier Amant romantique, directed by Just Jaeckin, in which she received a small role. In 1975, she starred in a touring production of Death of a Salesman in her native Britain. The same year, she was in the company of the Théâtre national de Nice.

In 1979, she received her first leading role in Lady Oscar, a historical drama directed by Jacques Demy based on the Japanese manga The Rose of Versailles by Riyoko Ikeda. According to MacColl, because Lady Oscar was not widely released in Europe, her career stalled:

"I met all kinds of incredible French directors and of course they all knew Jacques. And they would all say: 'Oh, you’re the girl who played the lead in the Demy film that never came out?' So, they all knew who I was, but that really didn’t help me."

=== Gates of Hell trilogy ===
She appeared in the first of director Lucio Fulci's Gates of Hell trilogy, City of the Living Dead. MacColl was hesitant to do City of the Living Dead, because she felt the screenplay was badly written. "It seemed to me like a series of special effects without a story," she said in an interview in 2011. She called her agent to seek his advice. He told her to "take the film, because nobody is going to see it anyway." MacColl says her agent turned out to be wrong about that.

She subsequently starred in the other films of the trilogy, The Beyond and The House by the Cemetery (both 1981). She was asked by Fulci to star in his next film The New York Ripper, but she declined.

=== Subsequent work ===
She has also appeared in such films as Hawk the Slayer (1980), Afraid of the Dark (1991), A Good Year (2006), and the 2011 horror anthology film The Theatre Bizarre.

She also starred in the Swiss short comedy film Employé du mois. In 1988, she starred in Pierre Bourgeade's play The Eagle and the Serpent in London.

MacColl has had a successful career in television. In 1978 she made her television debut in the French series Il était un musicien. Her credits include the mystery series Sherlock Holmes and Doctor Watson, the short-lived BBC series Squadron, the mini-series The Last Days of Pompeii, Dempsey and Makepeace, The Hardy Boys, and the French soap opera Plus belle la vie.

== Personal life ==
MacColl was married to actor Jon Finch from 1982 to 1987 and lives in France.

== Filmography ==
Key
| † | Denotes titles that have not yet been released |

=== Film ===
Catriona MacColl film credits
| Year | Title | Role | Notes |
|---|---|---|---|
| 1978 | Le Dernier Amant romantique | | |
| 1979 | Lady Oscar | Oscar François de Jarjayes | |
| 1980 | Le Fils puni | Woman in Photocopier | |
| 1980 | City of the Living Dead | Mary Woodhouse | Credited as 'Katherine MacColl' |
| 1980 | Hawk the Slayer | Eliane | |
| 1981 | The Beyond | Liza Merril | Credited as 'Katherine MacColl' |
| 1981 | The House by the Cemetery | Lucy Boyle | Credited as 'Katherine MacColl' |
| 1982 | Les diplômés du dernier rang | Lucy | |
| 1983 | Power Game | Elizabeth | |
| 1988 | Trois places pour le 26 | Betty Miller | |
| 1988 | Mangeuses d'Hommes | Deborah | |
| 1989 | Jeniec Europy | Lady Lowe | |
| 1991 | Afraid of the Dark | Blind Woman | |
| 1992 | Le bal des casse-pieds | Jean-Jean's Mother | |
| 1998 | A Soldier's Daughter Never Cries | Mrs. Smith | |
| 2004 | Saint Ange | Francard | |
| 2006 | A Good Year | English Woman | |
| 2011 | The Theatre Bizarre | Mere Antoinette | Segment: "Mother of Toads" |
| 2013 | Chimères | Michelle | |
| 2013 | A Long Way from Home | Middle-Aged English Woman | |
| 2013 | The Love Punch | Wedding Guest | |
| 2014 | Horsehead | Catelyn | |
| 2021 | Borrowed Time | Kate Denard | |
| 2021 | Borrowed Time II | Kate Denard | |
| 2022 | Borrowed Time III | Kate Denard | |
| 2023 | You and Eye | Catherine | |
| 2023 | Isaac | Dr. Abner | |
| TBD | Kaia † | Eleonore Goldstein | Post-production |

=== Television ===
Catriona MacColl television credits
| Year | Title | Role | Notes |
|---|---|---|---|
| 1980 | Sherlock Holmes and Doctor Watson | Helen Grey | Episode: "The Case of the Three Uncles" |
| 1980 | La Peau de chagrin | Countess Foedora | TV miniseries |
| 1982 | Les amours des années grises | Patricia | Episode: "Histoire d'un bonheur" |
| 1982 | Squadron | Flt. Dr. Susan Young | 7 episodes |
| 1984 | The Last Days of Pompeii | Julia | TV miniseries |
| 1985 | Dempsey and Makepeace | Angie Hughes | Episode: "Hors de Combat" |
| 1989 | Katts and Dog | Lydia | Episode: "The Grand Hotel Caper" |
| 1989 | The Hitchhiker | Catherine | Episode: "Garter Belt" |
| 1990 | Counterstrike | Lorraine Sydberg | Episode: "The Lady of the Rhine" |
| 1996 | Strangers | Eva | Episode: "Touch" |
| 2006 | Plus belle la vie | Ann Boccara | Episode: #2.182 |
