= Antoine Saint-John =

French actor (born 1940)

Antoine Saint-John (11 August 1940 – July 2, 1990) (a.k.a. Domingo Antoine, Jean-Michel Antoine, Antoine Michel) was a French actor.

Born in Avignon, France, he found work as a stage actor until the early 1970s, when he began working on films. His most famous role was in Spaghetti Westerns Duck, You Sucker! (1971), where he played a Mexican colonel. He also appeared in John Milius's historical epic The Wind and the Lion (1975), and My Name is Nobody (1973). He was also the zombified artist Schweick in Lucio Fulci's cult horror film The Beyond (1981). He spoke fluent English and German.

== Filmography ==
Year	Title	Role	Notes
1971	La grande scrofa nera		
1971	Duck, You Sucker!	Gutierez / Col. Günther Reza	
1972	... All the Way, Boys!	One of Mr. Ears gang	
1973	My Name is Nobody	Scape	
1974	The Secret	Gardien	
1975	The Killer Must Kill Again	Killer	
1975	The Wind and the Lion	Von Roerkel	
1975	Folle à tuer	Marcellin	
1975	Le vieux fusil	German soldier killed in the kitchen	
1981	The Beyond	Schweick	
1986	Ginger and Fred	Bandaged man	
1987	Cross	Le premier kidnapper	(final film role)
