= Afraid of the Dark (film) =

1991 French-British drama film

- Directed by: Mark Peploe
- Written by: Mark Peploe; Frederick Seidel
- Produced by: Simon Bosanquet; Jean Nachbaur
- Starring: James Fox; Fanny Ardant; Paul McGann; Clare Holman
- Cinematography: Bruno de Keyzer
- Edited by: Scott Thomas
- Music by: Richard Hartley; Jason Osborn
- Production companies: Les Films Ariane; Telescope Films; Ciné Cinq
- Distributed by: Rank Films Organization (UK); Fine Line Features (US)
- Release dates: October 1991 (Tokyo International Fantastic Film Festival); 21 February 1992 (UK)
- Running time: 91 minutes
- Countries: United Kingdom; France
- Language: English
- Box office: $53,932

Afraid of the Dark is a 1991 French-British drama horror film directed by Mark Peploe and starring James Fox, Fanny Ardant and Paul McGann.

Afraid of the Dark had its world premiere at the Tokyo International Fantastic Film Festival in October 1991. It screened at the BFI London Film Festival on 21 November 1991 and went into general theatrical release in the UK on 21 February 1992.

== Plot ==
Lucas is an introverted 11-year-old boy who lives with his policeman father Frank and blind mother Miriam. He spends most of his time at a school for the blind where his mother teaches knitting. He also has a habit of spying on others. A recent spate of attacks on blind women has kept the community on edge. One day, Lucas goes to spy on Rose, his mother's blind friend, as she takes some photos for the local photographer. Lucas sees the photographer ominously take out a razor blade and touch Rose with it. Thinking he is the wanted slasher, Lucas runs in to save Rose and wounds the photographer in the eye.

He awakes and realizes he was having a nightmare. Lucas overhears his parents whispering about the eye operation he needs. He continues to have strange visions of the killer as his mind begins to confuse reality and delusion.

== Cast ==
- James Fox as Frank
- Fanny Ardant as Miriam
- Paul McGann as Tony Dalton
- Clare Holman as Rose
- Robert Stephens as Dan Burns
- Susan Wooldridge as Lucy Trent
- David Thewlis as Locksmith / Tom Miller
- Ben Keyworth as Lucas
- Catriona MacColl as Blind Woman
- Hilary Mason as Basement Woman
- Sheila Burrell as Meg
- Gwyneth Strong as Blind Mother with Baby
- Star Acri as 1st Girl at Wedding
- Niven Boyd as Ice-Cream Man
- Tiffany Bryant as Tess
- Frances Cuka as Mrs. Dalton

== Critical reception ==
Afraid of the Dark received mixed critical reviews. TV Guide praised the film, though it admitted the film "does not succeed in linking its themes of voyeurism, oedipal complexes and fear of physical harm and then those in Lucas's overly mature imagination. The perversions he dreams up are far too sophisticated for a little boy. Nonetheless, Afraid of the Dark does its job as a horror film and makes one consider some difficult and ugly issues as well."

In a positive review, Michael Wilmington of the Los Angeles Times wrote, "'Afraid of the Dark' isn't an intellectually shallow terrorize-the-yuppies shocker. In many ways, it's a critique of the new contemporary family thrillers, of the ways movies like Fatal Attraction or The Hand That Rocks the Cradle push our buttons and feed our paranoia." Empire wrote, "Deftly avoiding self conscious experimentation and artsy intellectuality, writer/director Peploe constructs a mesmerising world of harsh contrasts and alarming juxtapositions."

Variety commented the film is "a tricky mix of slasher movie and psychodrama that's strong on tease but weak on final delivery."
