= Leontine (film) =

1968 film

- Directed by: Michel Audiard
- Written by: Michel Audiard; Henri Viard; Jean-Marie Poiré
- Produced by: Alain Poiré
- Starring: Françoise Rosay; Bernard Blier; Marlène Jobert
- Cinematography: Georges Barsky
- Edited by: Monique Isnardon; Robert Isnardon
- Music by: Georges Van Parys; Stéphane Varègues
- Production company: Gaumont
- Distributed by: Gaumont Distribution
- Release date: 6 September 1968
- Running time: 80 minutes
- Country: France
- Language: French

Leontine (French: Faut pas prendre les enfants du bon Dieu pour des canards sauvages, lit. 'You shouldn't take God's children for wild ducks', a phrase translating as "Don't take people for fools") is a 1968 French crime comedy film written and directed by Michel Audiard, and starring Françoise Rosay, Bernard Blier and Marlène Jobert.

It was the first film directed by Michel Audiard, until then known as a screenwriter and more specifically as a dialogue writer. It was shot at the Saint-Maurice Studios and on location around Paris and Menton on the French Riviera. The film's sets were designed by the art director Jean d'Eaubonne and Raymond Gabutti.

== Plot ==
Rita is an ambitious young gangster's moll in Paris, kept by the elegant Fred who acquires a load of gold ingots in transit. She betrays Fred to another gang boss, Charles, on the understanding that she will get 50%, but Charles, once he has the gold, rats on the deal. Rita goes to ask help from her aunt Léontine, living in retirement on the Riviera after being the mistress of major gangsters. Léontine comes to Paris and Charles, already tracked by Fred who wants his gold back, tries to eliminate this new menace. His first ploy, sending his handsome young nephew Tiburce to murder her, fails as Rita falls in love with him. When a full-scale night assault on Leontine's house ends with the corpses of his men going into the central heating furnace, Charles is ready to compromise and agrees to make a generous settlement if the two young people get married. On the day of the wedding he is still prevaricating, so Leontine shoots him dead and the festivities commence. She has cheated Fred out of his remaining booty, which can go to set up Rita.

== Cast ==
- Françoise Rosay as Leontine
- Bernard Blier as Charles
- Marlène Jobert as Rita
- André Pousse as Fred
- Robert Berri as one of Charles's men
- Gérald Bruneau as The Viking
- Michel Charrel as one of Charles's men
- Mario David as Jacky
- Sylvain Levignac as one of Charles's men
- Roger Mailles as one of Charles's men
- Raoul Saint-Yves as Raoul
- Jean Saudray as one of Charles's men
- Dominique Zardi as a killer
- Paul Frankeur as Ruffin
- Robert Dalban as Casimir
- Claude Rollet as Tiburce

== Bibliography ==
- Oscherwitz, Dayna & Higgins, MaryEllen. The A to Z of French Cinema. Scarecrow Press, 2009.
