= Roberta Weiss =

Canadian actress (born 1961)

- Born: November 15, 1961 (age 64); Medicine Hat, Alberta, Canada
- Other names: Roberta Bizeau
- Education: York University
- Occupation: Actor
- Years active: 1979–1993
- Spouse: Roscoe Born (m. 1994–2000)
- Children: 1

Roberta Jane Weiss (born November 15, 1961) is a Canadian actress. She sometimes works professionally as Roberta Bizeau. Weiss played Flame Beaufort on NBC's soap opera Santa Barbara.

== Early life and education ==
Weiss enrolled in the Manitoba School of Theatre and Allied Arts at the age of 16, later moving to Toronto to study theatre arts at York University. She gained national attention in Canada in an advertising campaign for Crispy Crunch.

== Career ==
In 1986 she starred in the films Abducted and High Stakes. In 1988 Weiss appeared as a scantily-clad island girl in the controversial cult French sex-comedy film Mangeuses d'Hommes. She also played the lead in the controversial film How to Make Love to a Negro Without Getting Tired, which Peter Rainier of the Los Angeles Times called "a flat parody." Weiss played "incendiary con artist" Flame Beaufort on NBC's soap opera Santa Barbara from 1990 to 1991, and later appeared in Family Passions, a soap opera produced in Canada with German funding. On Counterstrike, she played the manipulative and murderous art gallery owner Eve in the 1993 episode "French Twist."

== Personal life ==
Weiss married her Santa Barbara co-star Roscoe Born on September 30, 1994. Weiss is Jewish.

== Filmography ==
Roberta Weiss film and television credits
Year	Title	Role	Notes	Ref.
1979	Autumn Born	Melissa	Theatrical film	
1982	The Littlest Hobo	Rebecca	1 episode	
1983	The Terry Fox Story	Jeannie (uncredited)	Television film	
1983	The Dead Zone	Alma Frechette	Theatrical film	
1983	Cross-Country	Alma Jean	Theatrical film	
1985	The Hitchhiker	Roseanne Lucas	1 episode	
1985	Perry Mason Returns	Laura Gordon	Television film	
1986	Abducted	Renee	Theatrical film	
1986	Courage	Roberta	Television film	
1987	High Stakes	Terri Carson	Theatrical film	
1988	Alfred Hitchcock Presents	Tirina Clark	1 episode	
1988	Man Eaters	Elizabeth	Theatrical film	
1988	Shades of Love: Tangerine Taxi	Evan Moore	Television film	
1989	How to Make Love to a Negro Without Getting Tired	Miz Littérature	Theatrical film. French: Comment faire l'amour avec un nègre sans se fatiguer	
1990	La danse du scorpion (Frame-Up Blues)	Camille de Vito	Television film	
1990	Charles in Charge	Miss Spelling	1 episode	
1993	Counterstrike	Eve Jeffries	Episode: "French Twist"	
