= Tibor Méray =

Hungarian journalist (1924–2020)

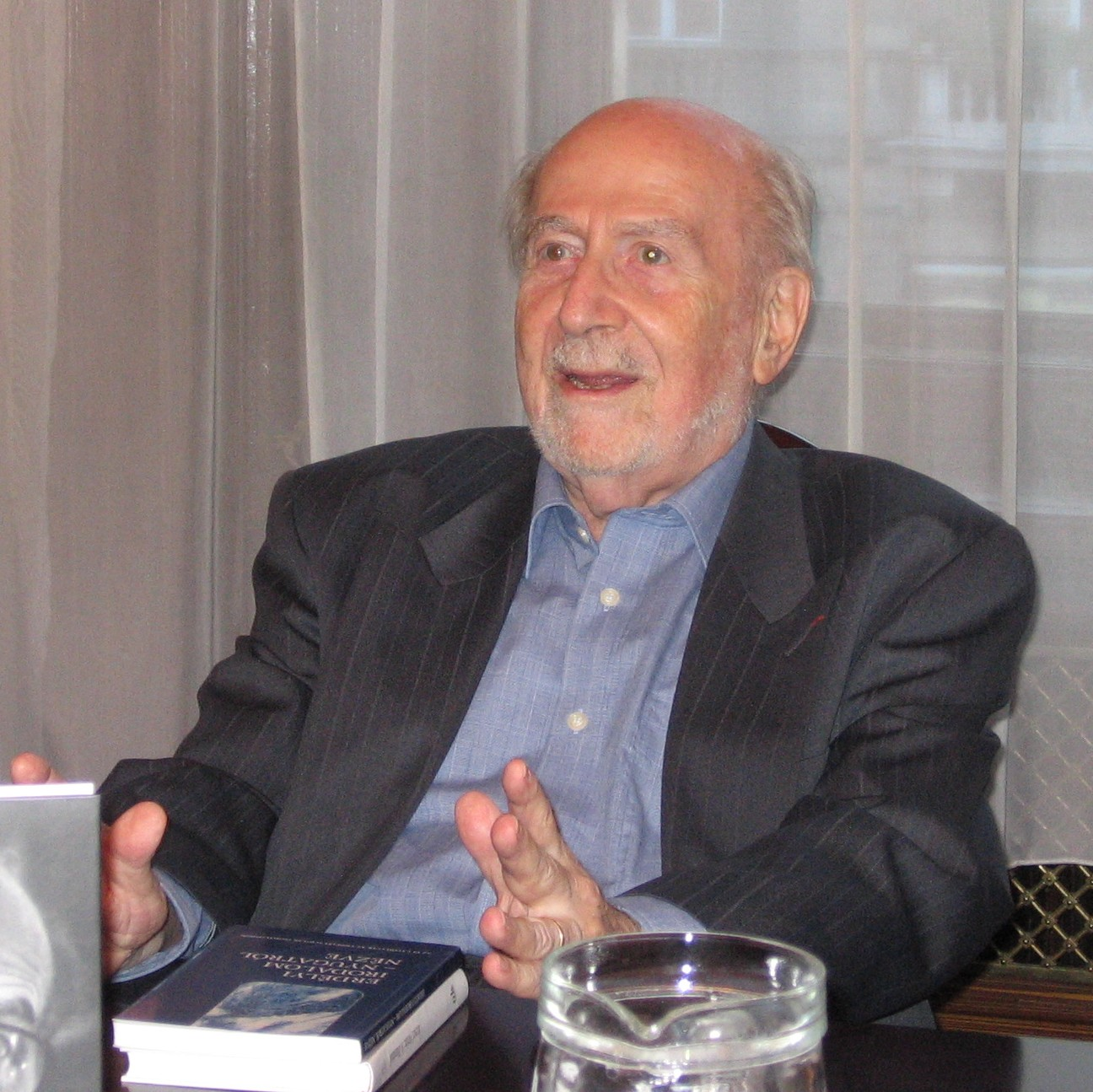
- Born: 6 April 1924; Budapest, Hungary
- Died: 12 November 2020 (aged 96); Paris, France
- Writing career
- Genre: journalist
- Notable awards: Attila József Prize (1951, 1952); Kossuth Prize (1953); Legion of Honour (1997)

Tibor Méray (6 April 1924 – 12 November 2020) was a Hungarian journalist and writer, worked for various newspapers (Szabad Nép, Csillag) during the Communist regime. He was a war correspondent for Szabad Nép (official daily of the ruling communist Hungarian Working People's Party and predecessor of the Népszabadság) during the Korean War.

As a supporter of the politics of Imre Nagy, he fled the country after the abortive uprising of 1956 and became a staunch anti-Communist, living in Paris, France. After working for several journals, he was editor-in-chief of the Irodalmi Újság, an important emigrant Hungarian-language weekly in Paris, from 1971 to 1989.

He co-wrote the 1969 comedy spy novel Catch Me a Spy, which was later adapted into a 1971 film To Catch a Spy starring Kirk Douglas.

Tibor Méray died on 12 November 2020 in Paris.
