= Gates of Hell trilogy =

Horror franchise

- Created by: Lucio Fulci; Dardano Sacchetti
- Original work: City of the Living Dead (1980)

Print publications
- Comics: List of comics

Films and television
- Film(s): List of films

The Gates of Hell trilogy (Italian: Trilogia della morte) is the unofficial name for a trilogy of films directed by Lucio Fulci. While the films are not direct sequels, they are thematically connected.

== Films ==
All three films star Katherine MacColl as a leading character, were written by Fulci and Dardano Sacchetti with Giorgio Mariuzzo co-writing The Beyond and The House by the Cemetery.

City of the Living Dead and The Beyond were both scored by Fabio Frizzi while The House by the Cemetery had a score composed by both Walter Rizzati and Alessandro Blonksteiner.

1. City of the Living Dead (1980)
2. The Beyond (1981)
3. The House by the Cemetery (1981)

== Comics ==
Eibon Press published comic adaptations of the films.

1. Romano, Stephen; Fulci, Lucio; Sacchetti, Dardano, Lucio Fulci's Gates of Hell, Eibon Press, ISBN 9781737994169
2. Romano, Stephen; Fulci, Lucio, Lucio Fulci's Gates of Hell Book 2: Son of the Deacon, Eibon Press, ISBN 9781958344088
3. Romano, Stephen; Fulci, Lucio, Lucio Fulci's Gates of Hell Book 3: Tears of Blood, Eibon Press, ISBN 9781958344095

== See also ==
- Zombi (film series)
- House (film series)
