= Mangeuses d'hommes =

1988 film by Daniel Colas

Mangeuses d'Hommes
- Directed by: Daniel Colas
- Written by: Daniel Colas (play and screenplay)
- Produced by: Jacques Biard; Marc-Andre Grynbaum; Patrice Martineau
- Starring: Catriona MacColl; Daniel Colas; Coralie Seyrig; Marc Sinden; Ray Lonnen; Roberta Weiss; Daniel Russo
- Cinematography: Jean Orjollet
- Edited by: Pierre Didier
- Music by: Aldo Frank
- Distributed by: BEL AIR-Pictures (Los Angeles); RT Productions; Slav 1
- Release date: 1988
- Running time: 127 min.
- Country: France
- Language: French

Mangeuses d'hommes (English language release title Man Eaters) is a 1988 French-language sex comedy/horror film directed by Daniel Colas

It its based on a farce of the same name, first performed on stage in Paris from 1981 on, running for over five years and written by Colas.

It is loosely based on the story of the survivors of the 1972 Andes plane crash who were forced to eat the bodies of their fellow passengers. It stars Catriona MacColl, Colas himself, Coralie Seyrig, Marc Sinden, Ray Lonnen, Roberta Weiss and Daniel Russo.

== Tagline ==
The film was advertised as follows: "Two shipwrecked castaways discover the island they have landed on is shared by three beautiful women living alone."

== Premise and controversy ==
The 'island girls' decide to fatten up one of the men (Charles, played by Sinden) as a future store of food and use the other (Hubert, played by Colas) for menial tasks. The method of killing Charles for the feast is for Deborah (played by MacColl) to have sex with him until he dies. This caused some controversy and a review wrote " "In France this will be regarded as Art. Everywhere else will regard it as almost hard-core pornography."

== Production ==
The film was shot in Sierra Leone (according to Catriona MacColl in an interview).

== Reception ==
The film "despite its title, largely spares the audience the physical details of cannibalism." It has been considered a variation on the theme of the Amazons.
