= The Secret (1974 film) =

1974 film by Robert Enrico

- Directed by: Robert Enrico
- Written by: Robert Enrico; Pascal Jardin (dialogue)
- Based on: Francis Ryck The novel "Le Compagnon indésirable"
- Starring: Jean-Louis Trintignant; Marlène Jobert; Philippe Noiret
- Cinematography: Étienne Becker
- Edited by: Eva Zora (as Ava Zora)
- Music by: Ennio Morricone
- Production company: Président Films
- Distributed by: Valoria Films
- Release date: 1974
- Running time: 102 minutes
- Countries: France; Italy
- Language: French

The Secret (French title Le Secret) is a 1974 French-Italian crime film directed by Robert Enrico and starring Jean-Louis Trintignant, Marlène Jobert and Philippe Noiret.

== Plot ==
At the start, we see "David" (Jean-Louis Trintignant) as a prisoner in some sort of torture chamber, a row of cells whose occupants, in straitjackets, are chained to their beds. David manages to escape from custody. On the run, he arrives at the home of a couple living in an isolated farmhouse (Marlène Jobert and Philippe Noiret). He claims that he is in possession of an important secret, one that he came across by chance, that is so terrible that the authorities will do anything to protect it. He predicts, correctly, that the state will soon mobilize all its resources to find him, using as a cover story the claim that a paranoid killer is on the loose from an asylum. The couple are unsure whether to believe him, but give him some assistance. Whether David is a fugitive of the secret police apparatus or is an escaped psychopath described by the police and press remains a mystery until the last moment of the film, when the authorities reveal their hand and "tie up loose ends".

== Cast ==
- Jean-Louis Trintignant as David Daguerre
- Marlène Jobert as Julia Vandal
- Philippe Noiret as Thomas Berthelot
- Jean-François Adam as Claude Vandal
- Solange Pradel as Greta
- Antoine Saint-John as Gardien
- Michel Delahaye as Le Médecin
- Maurice Vallier as Bertram
- Frédéric Santaya as Homme oiseaux
- Jean-Claude Fal as Le Forestier
- Patrice Melennec as Gendarme
- Pierre Danny as Chef commando
