= Squadron (TV series) =

- Created by: Peter May; Alastair Balfour; Joe Waters
- Starring: Michael Culver; Malcolm Stoddard; Catriona MacColl
- Theme music composer: Anthony Isaac
- Country of origin: United Kingdom
- Original language: English
- No. of series: 1
- No. of episodes: 10

Production
- Producer: Joe Waters
- Running time: 50 minutes

Original release
- Network: BBC1
- Release: 19 October – 21 December 1982

Squadron is a British television series produced by the BBC in 1982.

The series dealt with the adventures of the fictional 373 Rapid Deployment Squadron of the Royal Air Force. The Squadron operated a mix of operational RAF aircraft including the Harrier GR Mk 3, Hercules C Mk 1, Puma HC Mk 1 and the first episode, Phantom FGR Mk 2. One series of ten episodes was made. The leading cast members included Michael Culver, Malcolm Stoddard, Derek Anders, and Catriona MacColl.

== Credits ==
=== Regular Cast ===
- Michael Culver – Group Captain James Christie
- Malcolm Stoddard – Wing Commander Peter Tyson
- Alan Hunter – Squadron Leader Mike Fairchild
- Derek Anders – Squadron Leader Dave Grayson
- Richard Simpson – Group Captain Harry Hall
- Carl Rigg – Squadron Leader Clive Adams
- Catriona MacColl – Flight Lieutenant Dr. Susan Young

=== Crew ===
- Producer: Joe Waters
- Theme music: Anthony Isaac
- Script Editor: Mervyn Haisman

== Episodes ==
No.	Title	Directed by	Written by	Original release date
1	"Operation Flamingo"	Tristan de Vere Cole	Peter May & Alastair Balfour	19 October 1982
2	"Memorial Flight"	Christopher Baker	Mervyn Haisman	26 October 1982
3	"Independence Day"	Andrew Morgan	N. J. Crisp	2 November 1982
4	"Mascot"	Tristan de Vere Cole	Adrian Reid	9 November 1982
5	"The Veteran"	Renny Rye	Raymond Thompson	16 November 1982
6	"Deadline"	Tristan de Vere Cole	Peter May	23 November 1982
7	"One of Our Harriers Is Missing"	Christopher Baker	Kenneth Clarke	30 November 1982
8	"Operation Hawk"	Renny Rye	Raymond Thompson	7 December 1982
9	"Survival"	Joe Waters	N. J. Crisp	14 December 1982
10	"Cyclone"	Andrew Morgan	N. J. Crisp	21 December 1982
