= Noah Cowan =

Canadian executive director (1967–2023)

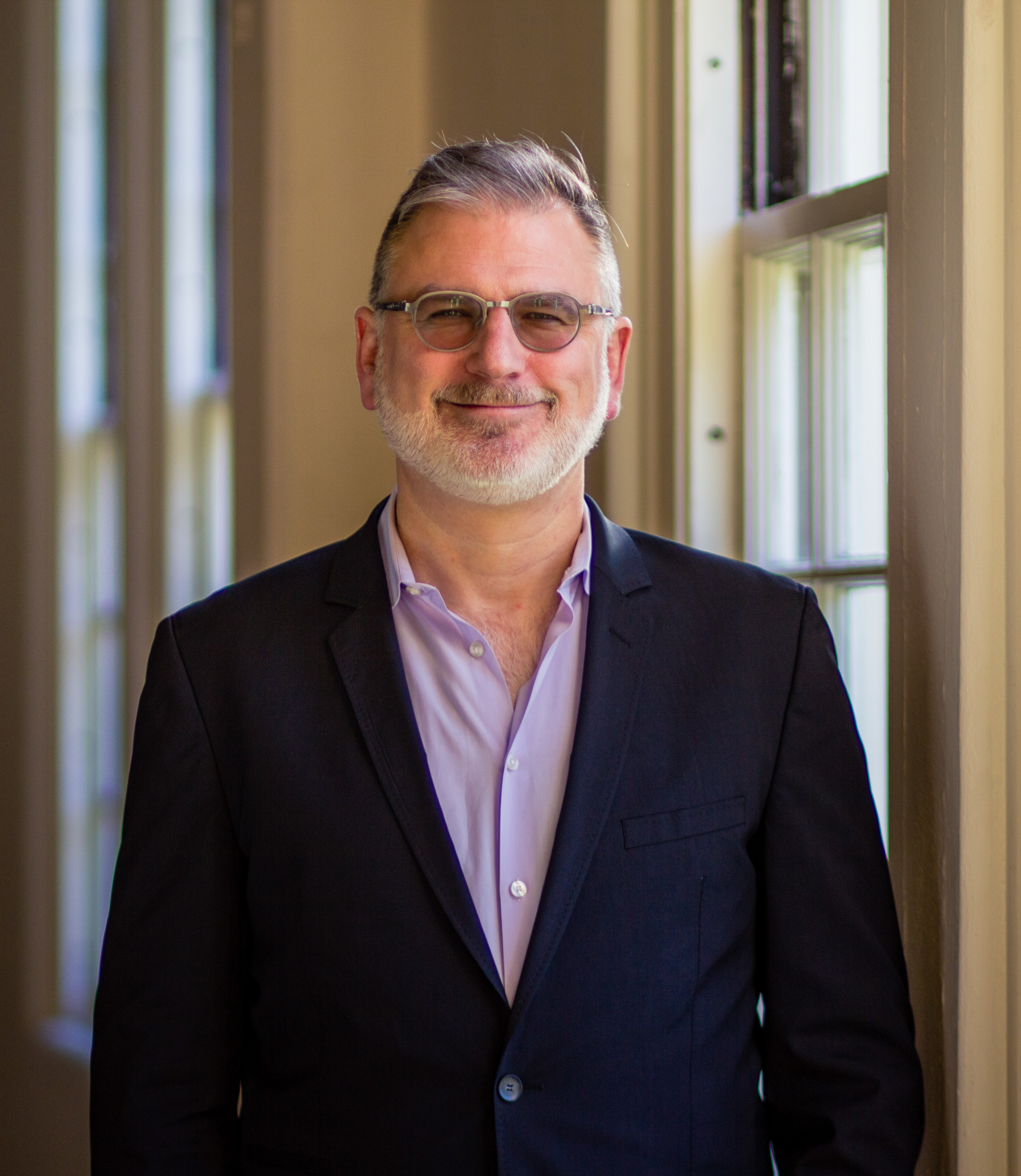
- Cowan in 2018
- Born: July 22, 1967; Hamilton, Ontario, Canada
- Died: January 25, 2023 (aged 55); Los Angeles, California, U.S.
- Education: McGill University (1989); University of Toronto Schools (1985)
- Occupation: Executive Director of SFFILM
- Years active: 2014–2023

Noah Cowan (July 22, 1967 – January 25, 2023) was a Canadian artistic director, who served as the executive director of SFFILM from March 2014 to May 2019. He oversaw the organization's exhibition, education, and filmmaker services. Before joining SFFILM, Cowan was the artistic director of TIFF Bell Lightbox, and also worked as the co-director of the Toronto International Film Festival from 2004 to 2008.

== Early career ==
Cowan was raised in Toronto, Ontario, Canada. He attended University of Toronto Schools before studying philosophy at McGill University, receiving a Bachelor of Arts in 1989. Cowan was Jewish.

Cowan began his career performing various roles at the Toronto International Film Festival. His first venture as a programmer was the Midnight Madness program, launched in 1989. He subsequently created national cinema retrospectives India Now! (with David Overbey) and The New Beat of Japan for the organization.

== Cowboy Booking International and Cowboy Pictures ==
Cowan developed Cowboy Booking International, a consolidating global sub-distributor for film sales agents such as Celluloid Dreams, Fortissimo Film Sales, Films Transit, Flach Pyramide and Christa Saredi Films, and producers such as Good Machine and Telling Pictures. Cowboy pioneered the application of a consistent fee structure for the growing number of film festivals worldwide to access international art films and documentaries.

In 1995, Cowan and John Vanco launched and served as co-presidents of Cowboy Pictures, an art house cinema distributor. Cowboy-released films were acclaimed by a number of organizations including the New York Film Critics Circle and The Academy Awards. Cowboy partnered with Antidote Films in 1999 to create Code Red Films, a vehicle to cross-collateralize several art film releases over three years. Titles distributed by Cowboy and Code Red included: The Life And Times Of Hank Greenberg, Fat Girl, George Washington, La Cienaga, Promises (nominated for Best Documentary at the 2002 Academy Awards) and The Endurance: Shackleton's Legendary Antarctic Expedition. Cowboy also acted as a releasing sub-distributor for Miramax Films, bringing to market their Rolling Thunder titles acquired in collaboration with Quentin Tarantino. Titles included Hard Core Logo, The Beyond, Mighty Peking Man.

== Global Film Initiative ==
In 2002, Cowan founded and served as executive director of the Global Film Initiative in New York City, a not-for-profit organization that seeks to create global understanding though film, with philanthropist Susan Weeks Coulter. In partnership with The Museum of Modern Art, the foundation funded, acquired, distributed and created educational material for socially meaningful cinema from the developing world. Global Lens, the Initiative's touring program, reached more than 50 communities per year, with a focus on screenings at museum-based youth programs. The Initiative wound down its activities in 2014.

== Later career ==
=== Toronto International Film Festival ===
From 2004 to 2008, Cowan acted as co-director of the Toronto International Film Festival. He helped launch Future Projections, which aimed to be a city-wide meeting of the visual arts and cinema. Under Cowan's direction, Future Projections collaborated with the Royal Ontario Museum, Power Plant Contemporary Art Gallery, Art Gallery of Ontario, and MOCCA.

=== TIFF Bell Lightbox ===
In 2008, Cowan became artistic director of TIFF Bell Lightbox, a multi-purpose film institution and the home of the Toronto International Film Festival. Cowan oversaw the film exhibition and film education functions of the project, which created film retrospectives on Raj Kapoor and Gregg Araki. On the Lightbox stage, he interviewed Guillermo del Toro, Christopher Doyle, Geena Davis and Susan Sarandon, among others. His writing appeared in 180°, Lightbox's seasonal programming guide. He also served as the primary curator of Lightbox's museum space, beginning with Essential Cinema, a gallery show detailing the inspiration behind 100 key films in cinema history. Cowan was the Toronto curator for several exhibitions including Tim Burton (a project of the Museum of Modern Art, New York) and Fellini: Spectacular Obsessions (which premiered at the Jeu du Paume in Paris in 2009).

Before his departure, Cowan completed two large-scale projects: A Century Of Chinese Cinema, a 100-film retrospective of Chinese cinema history that also included a new visual arts commission, New Women, from Yang Fudong, debuted in June 2013. Cowan co-curated the David Cronenberg: Evolution exhibition in October 2013 and David Cronenberg Transformation, the accompanying museum show at the Museum Of Contemporary Canadian Art of visual artists responding to Cronenberg’s work. He contributed to catalogues for both shows, oversaw an Alternative Reality Game (Body/Mind/Change, created by Lance Weiler) and the David Cronenberg Virtual Exhibition.

=== SFFILM ===
In March 2014, Cowan became executive director of San Francisco Film Society (which he rebranded as SFFILM in 2016). He led a staff of 33 full-time employees and over 100 seasonal employees and interns each year and built unique partnerships with key cultural institutions and locally meaningful brands across San Francisco, including SFMOMA, Yerba Buena Center for the Arts, Dolby, Lucasfilm and Pixar. While doubling the organization's revenue, Cowan worked with his team to create a revamped annual charity gala as a major national award season event, including a $250,000 net annual Fund-A-Need campaign for education initiatives. He successfully moved SFFILM Festival's theater footprint to transit-friendly neighborhoods, resulting in a significant shift to younger and more diverse audience demographics and doubled foundation support for artist development activities, initiating unique new programs with Alfred P. Sloan, Westridge, Flora Family, Compton and Time Warner Foundations, He also launched SFFILM Invest, a major initiative to bring philanthropic and equity-based investments to contemporary American independent films; initial slate generated $1 million in investments. He left SFFILM in May 2019.

Cowan had worked as an independent consultant to film festivals, movie theaters, producers and media-related NGOs from October 2019.
