= Chantal Goya =

French singer and actress (born 1942)

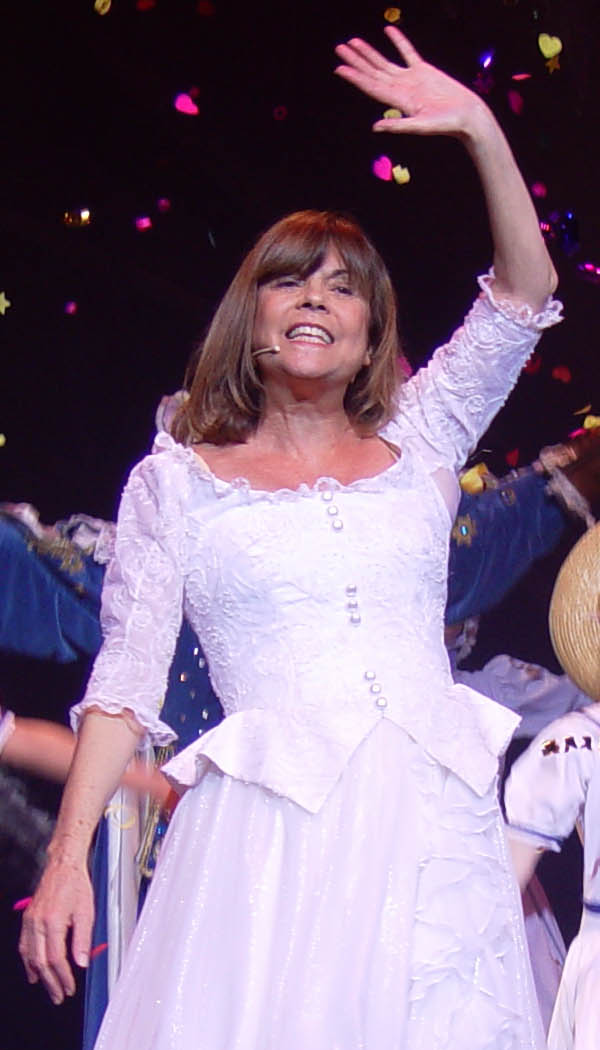
- Goya in 2007

Background information
- Born: Chantal de Guerre; 10 June 1942 (age 84); Saigon, French Indochina (present-day Ho Chi Minh City, Vietnam)
- Origin: France
- Occupations: Singer, actress
- Years active: 1963–present

Chantal de Guerre (French pronunciation: [ʃɑ̃tal də ɡɛʁ]; born 10 June 1942), known as Chantal Goya ([ɡɔja]), is a French singer and actress.

Goya started her career as a yé-yé singer, singing a mid-1960s hybrid of girl-group pop and French chanson. She also enjoyed a career as a French New Wave actress; she had a starring role as Madeleine in the 1966 Jean-Luc Godard film Masculin, féminin and in Jean-Daniel Pollet's L'amour c'est gai, l'amour c'est triste (Love is joy, love is sad).

Since 1975, she has become mostly known as a singer for children. Together with her husband, songwriter and composer Jean-Jacques Debout, and with a team of designers and costume people, she does shows for and with children. The main themes are dreams and traveling. Her usual character is called Marie-Rose.

== Life ==
Chantal was born in French Indochina in 1942 to French parents. During the Indochina war she moved to France with her family in 1954 and lived in the Vosges mountains, and at the beginning of the 1960s, she moved to Paris with her family. She met singer/composer Jean Jacques Debout when she was 18. The couple remain married.

After having received her baccalaureat, Chantal started studying journalism in England. During this period in Paris, one of her friends took her to the reception of Eddie Barclay's wedding. Jean-Jacques Debout was one of the artists invited to this reception. At that time, he had been recording 45 rpm records since 1957, and had received some success, like "Les boutons dorés" (The golden buttons). He was a friend of the ye-ye girl Sylvie Vartan for whom he wrote and composed the hit "Tous mes copains" (All my friends). In 1963, Vartan was in a relationship with the ye-ye and rock-n-roll singer Johnny Hallyday and she would marry him in 1965. Debout, who was in love with Vartan, remained single in his personal life. At this reception, he saw Chantal who was sitting at the back of the living room, and he fell in love at first sight with her. He went to tell her that she would be famous by the age of 30, have two children, and singing at the Opera. Chantal didn't believe him and went to London to finish her studies.

Upon her return in France, Debout was waiting for her at the station and sang to her a song he had written and composed when she was in England, called "Nos doigts se sont croisés" (Our fingers had been crossed), and Chantal fell in love with him. With this song, Debout participated in and won the Festival de la Rose d'Or d'Antibes (Music Festival of Antibes's golden rose).

In 1964, Chantal first became a model for fashion photographers in the teenage girls' magazine "Mademoiselle Âge Tendre" (Little Miss Tender Age). That year, Debout decided to rename her Chantal Goya because he thought that she looked like a little boy painted by the Spanish painter Francisco Goya. Daniel Filipacchi was the owner of the magazine and also the record producer of the French division of RCA Records. He suggested that Debout write and compose songs in return for a record contract for her. The first 45 EP record of Chantal Goya released at the end of 1964 and it includes the song "C'est bien Bernard" (It's Bernard himself) which became her first hit success.

In the fall of 1964, Chantal was invited to the TV show Rendez-vous sur le Rhin, presented by Albert Raisner, to sing her first song "C'est bien Bernard," which the influential film director Jean-Luc Godard was watching. At that time, he was writing the storyline of his movie "Masculin, féminin" (Masculine, feminine) and directly saw that she fit well with the role of Madeleine Zimmer in his movie. He offered the role to her, and though she was surprised by this proposition, she accepted the role alongside Jean-Pierre Léaud in the role of Paul, and Marlène Jobert in the role of Elisabeth. Although the movie was deemed unsuitable for audiences under the age of 18 upon its release on 22 March 1966, it sold 427,430 tickets at the box office in France.

She had another success in France with the song "Une écharpe, une rose" (A scarf, a rose) which was also a success in Japan. But, afterwards, the records that she recorded had less success in France. She also played in less movies. But her husband Jean-Jacques Debout still wrote and composed songs for the TV-Shows produced by Maritie and Gilbert Carpentier.

Also, in 1973, Chantal Goya sang the duet Les petites filles modèles with Sylvie Vartan, song written and composed by Jean-Jacques Debout in the TV-show Top à produced by Maritie and Gilbert Carpentier and devoted to Sylvie Vartan.

In 1975, Jean-Jacques Debout hosted, composed lyrics and music and sang in a TV-show Numero Un produced by Maritie and Gilbert Carpentier. He invited the French actress Brigitte Bardot to perform, however she fell ill and was unavailable on the day of recording. The closing number ended up being a song he wrote and composed called Adieu les jolis foulards, which was sung by Chantal Goya and children.

This song, in which she plays the role of a French teacher who teaches in a school in Martinique and must return to France, is her first song specifically for children. The performance resulted in many phone calls and letters to the TV station TF1 from people wishing to purchase the song. Maritie Carpentier convinced Chantal Goya to make a record of Adieu les Jolis Foulards, certain it would be a big success.

For months, Chantal Goya and Jean-Jacques Debout pitched the song to record labels in Paris, with little success. Until they met François Dacla, the director of the French arm of RCA Records, at a José Féliciano performance. They performed the song in his office in Paris the next day. Moved by the song, François Dacla released and produced the single, and Chantal Goya became a children's singer.

== Partial filmography ==
- Charade (1963) (uncredited)
- Masculin, féminin (1966)
- Wenn Ludwig ins Manöver zieht (1967)
- L'échelle blanche (1969)
- Tout peut arriver (1969)
- L'amour c'est gai, l'amour c'est triste (1971)
- Les Gaspards (1974)
- Trop c'est trop (1975)
- Absolument fabuleux (2001)

== Selected discography ==
=== Albums ===
- Allons chanter avec Mickey (1977)
- La Poupée (1978)
- Bécassine (1979)
- C'est Guignol (1980)
- Comme Tintin (1981)
- Le Soulier Qui Vole(1981)
- La Planète Merveilleuse (1982)
- Babar (1983)
- Le Mystérieux Voyage (1984)
- Félix le Chat (1985)
- Bravo Popeye (1986)
- Le monde tourne à l'envers (1987)
- Isabelle, c'est la fille de Babar (1988)
- L'Étrange histoire du château hanté (1989)
- Rythme et couleur (1990)
- Mes personnages enchantés (1993)
- Le Soulier qui vole 95 (1995)
- Le Grenier aux trésors (1997)
- Absolument Goya (2002)

=== Singles ===
- C'est bien Bernard (1964)
- Une écharpe une rose (1965)
- Si tu gagnes au flipper (1965)
- D'abord dis-moi ton nom (1966)
- Laisse moi (1966)
- Pense pas trop (1967)
- Les boules de neige (1972)
- Ma Poupee De Chine

=== Compilations ===
- Les années 60 (1998)
- Féminin: The Complete '60s Recordings (RPM Records 2013)

== Songs ==
- "C'est bien Bernard"
- "Une écharpe, une rose"
- "Tu m'as trop menti"
- "Laisse-moi"
- "Adieu les jolis foulards"
- "Davy Crockett"
- "Let's sing along with Mickey Mouse"
- "La muñeca"
- "Bécassine is my cousine"
- "Sorrow"
- "Pandi-Panda, a lovely Chinese bear"
- "Snoopy"
- "Félix le chat"
- "Bravo Popeye"
- "Ce Matin, Un Lapin"
- "Prends une rose"
