= Hawk the Slayer =

1980 British fantasy film by Terry Marcel

- UK quad poster
- Directed by: Terry Marcel
- Screenplay by: Terry Marcel; Harry Robertson
- Story by: Terry Marcel; Harry Robertson
- Produced by: Harry Robertson
- Starring: Jack Palance; John Terry; Bernard Bresslaw; Harry Andrews; Cheryl Campbell; Annette Crosbie; Roy Kinnear; Catriona MacColl; Patrick Magee; Ferdy Mayne; Graham Stark
- Cinematography: Paul Beeson
- Edited by: Eric Boyd-Perkins
- Music by: Harry Robertson
- Production companies: Chips Productions; Marcel/Robertson Productions Limited
- Distributed by: ITC Entertainment
- Release date: 18 December 1980 (London)
- Running time: 94 minutes
- Country: United Kingdom
- Language: English
- Budget: £600,000

Hawk the Slayer is a 1980 sword and sorcery adventure film directed by Terry Marcel and starring John Terry and Jack Palance. It follows Hawk and Voltan, two warring brothers. Hawk, wielding a magical sword, assembles a small force of fighters to rid the land of Voltan. The film was received negatively upon its initial release, but has since developed a cult following. Sequels were planned, but never produced.

== Plot ==
Voltan infiltrates his father's castle and demands the key to the ancient power but is denied. The wicked Voltan mortally wounds his own father when the latter refuses to turn over the magic of the "last elven mind stone". As the old man lies dying, another son, Hawk, enters the castle, and is bequeathed a great sword with a pommel shaped like a human hand which attaches itself to the mind stone, creating the powerful “Mindsword”. The sword is now imbued with magical powers and can respond to Hawk's mental commands. Hawk then vows to avenge his father by killing Voltan.

Voltan torments the whole countryside. Some time later a warrior, Ranulf, is struggling to run away from Voltan's forces. Ranulf arrives at a remote convent. Ranulf tells the nuns that he survived Voltan's attack on his village and his people, which resulted in the brutal deaths of women and children. Ranulf is seriously injured, losing his hand, and is nursed back to health by the nuns.

Voltan calls out to his wizard to stave off the pain he has in his wounded face. The wizard performs a spell on his face, telling him “your face will not pain you for a while” and “there is one who stands between us and the final victory; you will prepare the way to his death.”

Voltan appears at the convent, interrupting the nuns' mass and kidnapping the Abbess, demanding a large sum of gold as a ransom. After Voltan and his henchmen leave with the Abbess, the nuns tell Ranulf to seek the High Abbot at the Fortress of Danesford.

Ranulf arrives at the fortress of Daneford. The High Abbot tells him to find the warrior called Hawk. The High Abbot gives Ranulf a token to give to Hawk when he finds him.

Hawk is traveling through the land and discovers Ranulf has been captured by brigands. Hawk rescues him and Ranulf convinces Hawk to rescue the Abbess.

Hawk locates his old friends: Gort, a giant who wields a war hammer; Crow, an elf who uses a bow; and Baldin, a dwarf skilled with a whip. The five warriors steal gold from a slave trader to pay the ransom.

Voltan's son Drogo leads some men to the convent to collect the gold, but Hawk and his team fend them off. Later they attack Voltan's camp and kill some more of his men before retreating. A nun insists they should just pay the ransom, but Hawk doubts that Voltan will free the Abbess even after the ransom is paid as Voltan had treacherously murdered Hawk's wife, Eliane. The nun makes a deal with Voltan to drug Hawk's team, which allows Voltan to capture them. A sorceress, another friend of Hawk's, helps the heroes escape, but Baldin is mortally wounded as a result.

The heroes now attack the convent for the last time for Hawk to exact his revenge on Voltan; Crow is wounded and Ranulf is killed, Hawk battles his way to Voltan, taking down Voltan's men mercilessly, until he confronts Voltan, who has managed to take Gort and the Abbess's sisters prisoner. Hawk asks for them to be set free in exchange for Hawk becoming Voltan's prisoner. Voltan agrees but Hawk manages to free Gort, and the two fight Voltan and his remaining men, killing them all.

Hawk and Gort head off to find new adventures leaving Crow to be tended to by the nuns. An evil wizard carries off Voltan's body.

== Cast ==
- John Terry as Hawk
- Jack Palance as Voltan, Hawk's evil brother
- Bernard Bresslaw as Gort, a giant
- Ray Charleson as Crow, an elf
- Peter O'Farrell as Baldin, a dwarf
- W. Morgan Sheppard as Ranulf
- Patricia Quinn as Woman, a Sorceress
- Cheryl Campbell as Sister Monica
- Annette Crosbie as Abbess
- Catriona MacColl as Eliane
- Shane Briant as Drogo
- Harry Andrews as High Abbot
- Christopher Benjamin as Fitzwalter
- Roy Kinnear as Innkeeper
- Patrick Magee as Priest
- Ferdy Mayne as Old Man (Hawk & Voltan's Father)
- Graham Stark as Sparrow
- Warren Clarke as Scar
- Derrick O'Connor as Ralf
- Peter Benson as Black Wizard

== Production ==
Hawk the Slayer was the brainchild of Terry Marcel and Harry Robertson. Working together, they discovered that they were both fans of sword and sorcery. They wanted to make a low-budget film to capitalize on the growing interest in the genre. Large-scale adaptations such as Thongor and Conan the Barbarian were either struggling to find backing, or undergoing budget negotiations. Marcel and Robertson initially planned to finance the feature with private money, and Roger Corman was to distribute it, but Lew Grade said he would guarantee the movie.

Marcel has stated that the film was originally intended to be historical, and not include sorcery. However, in the course of writing the script, he added the magical mind stone to the story.

The feature was shot over the course of six weeks in Buckinghamshire (particularly within Burnham Beeches), United Kingdom.

The score is by the film’s co-writer and co-producer Harry Robertson who had previously scored several Hammer Films including Countess Dracula and Twins of Evil. It is reminiscent of Jeff Wayne's song "The Eve of the War" from the album The War of the Worlds, an extremely popular album at the time. It therefore contains a lot more electronic sounds than Robertson’s previous scores. The character of Hawk is given a leitmotif, a five note electronic whistle, not unlike the one given to Clint Eastwood’s characters in the Sergio Leone westerns.

== Release and reception ==
The film opened at the Odeon Marble Arch on 18 December 1980. The film did well when it was released in the United Kingdom, but the collapse of the distribution company ITC prevented a theatrical release in the United States. The movie's American premiere was on television, as part of The CBS Late Movie series, on December 3, 1982.

== Legacy ==
=== Sequels ===
The producers wanted to make multiple sequels. In a 1980 interview, Marcel said, "I'll be going on a trip looking for locations for the next one. Whether ITC does it or not, we will be making Hawk the Destroyer in February [1981]". The film was never made, however.

In 2015, a film titled Hawk the Hunter was reported to be in development with a $5 million budget, partially crowdfunded via Kickstarter. Marcel said that the movie would be a prequel, exploring the origins of Hawk and Voltan, and the idea that there was more than one magical stone. He also planned a television series titled Hawk the Destroyer, and a video game by British developer Rebellion Developments was slated to be produced. The fundraiser was unsuccessful, however. In 2017, a message was posted to the official Facebook page of the sequel, stating, "Hawk the Hunter has been left behind as a distant dream."

=== RiffTrax version ===
RiffTrax released a version of the film with a humorous commentary track on video on demand on October 16, 2014.

=== Comic ===
In 2022, a Hawk the Slayer comic was published in supplements to Judge Dredd Megazine #440–#444, and separately as a limited series. The story takes place after the events of the film. The comic was written by Garth Ennis and features art by Henry Flint.

=== In other media ===
In the sitcom Spaced, Bilbo (Bill Bailey) is a passionate fan of the film.

On their 2013 single "Nothing's Gonna Stop Us", British rock band The Darkness sample a line of dialogue spoken by Drogo in the movie.
