= Abducted (film) =

1985 Canadian thriller film

- RCA VHS artwork
- Directed by: Boon Collins
- Written by: Boon Collins; Lindsay Bourne
- Produced by: Harold J. Cole
- Starring: Dan Haggerty; Roberta Weiss
- Cinematography: Robert McLachlan
- Edited by: Bruce Lange
- Music by: Michel Rubini
- Production company: Erin Films
- Distributed by: Interpictures Releasing
- Release date: December 12, 1986
- Running time: 90 minutes
- Country: Canada
- Language: English

Abducted is a 1986 Canadian thriller film directed by Boon Collins and starring Dan Haggerty, Lawrence King-Phillips, and Roberta Weiss. The film follows Vern, a mountain man who abducts jogger Renee and holds her prisoner at his cabin.

== Plot ==
Renee, a young jogger, is running through a sprawling nature preserve in British Columbia when she senses she is being followed. She is ultimately attacked by Vern, a mountain man who forces her to accompany him deep into the wilderness. When Vern tries to force Renee to climb a large mountain, she flees and hides through the night, but is captured by Vern again at dawn. The two travel further into the woods, with Renee nearly drowning after she falls from a log spanning a river.

The two eventually reach a very remote cabin, where Vern attempts to rape Renee, but stops himself short of doing so. Vern continues to hold Renee captive. While fishing on the river with Vern, Renee walks upstream and is approached by a man named Joe Evans. When Renee tells Joe she is being held a prisoner, Joe accompanies her to speak to Vern, and it is revealed that Joe is in fact Vern's father—the two men live together in the woods. Joe promises to return Renee to civilization, despite Vern's wish to keep her.

En route to bring Renee back to safety, the trio witness a helicopter flying overhead before encountering two hunters. Renee begins to scream for help, causing Vern to shoot one of the hunters, while the helicopter pilot saves the other hunter, leaving Renee in Vern and Joe's clutches. Joe reneges on his promise to return Renee, fearing that law enforcement will now be seeking them for the hunter's murder.

Vern grows increasingly disturbed and possessive of Renee despite his father's attempts to control his volatile temper. Vern eventually bludgeons Joe and abandons him, leaving him to die, and flees with Renee. Vern continues to sexually threaten Renee, psychologically tormenting her. Renee manages to steal Vern's rifle and flees into the woods, but falls down a hillside and over a cliff, landing in a river below. Renee swims to safety while Vern fires at her from above. She manages to flee to railroad tracks, where Vern confronts her, only to be shot by Joe, who has survived his wounds. Joe watches in rueful silence as Renee follows the rail tracks back to civilization.

== Cast ==
- Dan Haggerty as Joe Evans
- Roberta Weiss as Renee
- Lawrence King-Phillips as Vern
- William Nunn as Hunter
- Stephen E. Miller as Guide

== Production ==
=== Development ===
The film was loosely based on a kidnapping case in the United States that writer-director Boon Collins had read an article about, in which a female biathlon runner was abducted by a father and son.

=== Casting ===
Collins cast actor Dan Haggerty in the role of Joe Evans; Haggerty, who at the time had recently been in legal trouble for a drug bust, had played the titular Grizzly Adams in The Life and Times of Grizzly Adams film and television series. In the role of Renee, the abducted protagonist, Collins cast Roberta Weiss in Toronto, feeling that she had a "serious" demeanor that worked for the role. Collins cast Lawrence King-Phillips, a friend of his sister's when the two studied together at Ryerson University, as the maniacal Vern.

=== Filming ===
Principal photography took place immediately north of Vancouver, British Columbia on a budget of under CA$200,000. The shoot lasted approximately 17 days.

== Release ==
Abducted has a one-week theatrical release in Canada beginning December 12, 1986.

=== Home media ===
RCA Columbia Home Entertainment released the film on VHS in the United Kingdom.

Canadian International Pictures released the film for the first time on Blu-ray in 2024.

== Reception ==
=== Critical response ===
VideoHound's Golden Movie Retriever characterized it as a "weird and unbelievably tedious" film whose primary value is that it contains spectacular wilderness footage.

Peter Clements, David Appleby and Don White received a Genie Award nomination for Best Overall Sound at the 8th Genie Awards in 1987.

== Related works ==
Collins released a sequel film, Abducted II: The Reunion, in 1994.
