= City of the Living Dead =

1980 supernatural horror film by Lucio Fulci

- Italian theatrical release poster
- Italian: Paura nella città dei morti viventi
- Literally: Fear in the city of the living dead
- Directed by: Lucio Fulci
- Written by: Lucio Fulci; Dardano Sacchetti
- Produced by: Mino Loy
- Starring: Christopher George; Katherine MacColl; Carlo de Mejo; Antonella Interlenghi; Giovanni Lombardo Radice; Daniela Doria; Fabrizio Jovine; Janet Agren
- Cinematography: Sergio Salvati
- Edited by: Vincenzo Tomassi
- Music by: Fabio Frizzi
- Production companies: Dania Film; Medusa Distribuzione; National Cinematografica
- Distributed by: Medusa Distribuzione
- Release date: 11 August 1980 (Italy)
- Running time: 93 minutes
- Country: Italy
- Languages: English; Italian
- Box office: ₤985 million (547,773.91 US Dollars)

City of the Living Dead (Italian: Paura nella città dei morti viventi, lit. 'Fear in the city of the living dead', also released as The Gates of Hell) is a 1980 Italian supernatural horror film co-written and directed by Lucio Fulci. It stars Christopher George, Katherine MacColl, Carlo de Mejo, Antonella Interlenghi, Giovanni Lombardo Radice, and Janet Agren. The film follows a priest whose suicide opens a gateway to hell that releases the undead, leading a psychic and a reporter team up to close it before All Saints' Day.

City of the Living Dead was developed after the financial success of Fulci's previous film, Zombi 2, leading him to work with screenwriter Dardano Sacchetti to write a new horror film inspired by the works of H.P. Lovecraft. The film was greenlit during production of Contraband, which Fulci left to begin working on City of the Living Dead. Principal photography was shot predominantly on location in the United States, in New York City and Savannah, Georgia, with interiors shot in Rome.

City of the Living Dead was theatrically released in Italy in August 1980, which grossed ₤985 million. It was followed by a release throughout Europe, including a screening at the Paris International Festival of Fantastic and Science-Fiction Film, where Fulci won the Audience Award, and in the United States in April 1983. Upon release, the film received criticism for its performances, plot, and graphic violence, but like many of Fulci's films, has developed a cult following. It is the first film in Fulci's Gates of Hell trilogy.

== Plot ==
In New York City, during a séance held in the apartment of medium Theresa, Mary Woodhouse experiences a vision of a priest, Father Thomas, hanging himself in a cemetery of a village called Dunwich. Mary breaks the circle and collapses to the floor when the images overwhelm her. The group presumes Mary is dead and calls the police, who suspect foul play. Theresa warns the police chief of an imminent evil. Journalist Peter Bell begins to investigate Mary's death and visits her grave as she is about to be buried. However, she is still alive, and Peter saves her after hearing her cries. Peter and Mary visit Theresa, who says that according to the ancient book of Enoch, the events Mary witnessed in her visions presage the eruption of the living dead into our world. Father Thomas' death has opened the gates of Hell, and the invasion will commence on the upcoming All Saints Day.

In Dunwich, Bob, a young vagrant, visits an abandoned house but flees after seeing a carcass. Across town, Gerry, a psychiatrist, is in consultation with Sandra, a neurotic patient. Emily Robbins, his 19-year-old girlfriend and personal assistant, later tells him that she will meet with Bob, whom she has been trying to help. That evening, Emily finds Bob at a derelict garage exhibiting unusual behavior. Father Thomas then appears as Bob runs away, smothering Emily to death with a maggot-covered hand. The next morning, Emily's body is found. Emily's father tells the sheriff and Gerry of his suspicions about Bob due to the latter's history of crime. Meanwhile, Peter and Mary leave New York and embark upon their search for Dunwich.

That evening, Bob returns to the deserted house and has a vision of Father Thomas. After Emily's funeral, her younger brother John-John sees her ghostly image outside his bedroom window. At Sandra's house, the corpse of an elderly woman, Mrs. Holden, appears on her kitchen floor. Sandra calls Gerry for help, but the body disappears as soon as Gerry arrives. The two search the house but are disturbed by many occurrences, such as a window breaking, with the glass then dripping human blood.

Meanwhile, Bob has taken refuge in the garage of a local man, Mr. Ross. Ross's teenage daughter Ann finds Bob and offers him marijuana. Ross bursts in and attacks Bob, fearful he is trying to seduce his daughter. Ross kills Bob by impaling his head through a drilling lathe.

The following morning, Peter and Mary arrive at the graveyard that Mary saw in her vision. They begin searching for Father Thomas' tomb and meet Gerry and Sandra. They go back to Gerry's office to discuss Father Thomas' death when the four are showered with maggots. Gerry then receives a call from John-John explaining Emily has returned and killed his parents. They rush over to the Robbins' house and try to find the sheriff. While Sandra tries to get John-John to safety, Emily rips her scalp off. John-John runs through the town's streets and is saved by Gerry, who hands the boy over to the police.

While drinking at a bar, Mr. Ross is attacked by the re-animated dead people of the town, led by Bob. Ross and two other men are killed, as a state-of-emergency is declared over the radio. Mary, Peter, and Gerry arrive back at the graveyard as the clock strikes midnight and All Saints Day begins. They descend into Father Thomas' family tomb, discovering a cave of skeletal remains and cobwebbed putrescences. Appearing as a zombie, Sandra kills Peter before Gerry impales her with a metal spike. Mary and Gerry continue until they face Father Thomas, commanding an army of the undead. Before he can kill Mary, Gerry grabs a wooden cross and disembowels Father Thomas. The priest and the other revived corpses burst into flames and disappear. Mary and Gerry exit into the graveyard in the morning to see John-John and the police. Mary is relieved to see John-John alive but becomes frightened and screams as he runs towards her.

== Cast ==
- Christopher George as Peter Bell
- Catriona MacColl as Mary Woodhouse
- Carlo De Mejo as Gerry
- Janet Agren as Sandra
- Antonella Interlenghi as Emily Robbins
- Giovanni Lombardo Radice as Bob
- Daniela Doria as Rosie Kelvin
- Fabrizio Jovine as Father William Thomas
- Luca Venantini as John-John Robbins
- Michele Soavi as Tommy Fisher
- Venantino Venantini as Mr. Ross
- Robert Sampson as Sheriff Russell
- Adelaide Aste as Teresa
- Enzo D'Ausilio as Deputy
- Luciano Rossi as New York Police Officer

Uncredited

- Lucio Fulci as Dr. Joe Thompson
- Nat Bush as Sgt. Clay
- Michael Gaunt as First gravedigger
- Perry Pirkkanen as Second gravedigger

== Production ==
=== Development and writing ===
After Zombi 2 grossed over 1.5 billion lire in Italy, director Lucio Fulci began working on a new horror script with screenwriter Dardano Sacchetti. Elements of the story are influenced by the work of H.P. Lovecraft, such as naming the town the film is set in Dunwich, after Lovecraft's The Dunwich Horror. Sacchetti noted that Fulci had just reread Lovecraft before working on the film's script, stating he wanted to re-create a Lovecraftian atmosphere. In Sacchetti's original writings, the story is not set in Dunwich, but Salem. This script also includes characters not used in the film, such as Mike, a homeless man who is devoured by cats and reappears later in the film as a zombie.

Sacchetti recalled that, after completing the script, it was shelved for some time, due to their commitments to other projects. Fulci did not want to work with Zombi 2 producer Fabrizio De Angelis again and convinced Renato Jaboni of Medusa Distribuzione and Luciano Martino and Mino Loy of Dania and National Cinematografica to contribute. The project was greenlit during the production of Contraband, which Fulci left with his assistant director, Roberto Giandalia, to finish principal photography.

=== Casting ===
Early choices for the cast included Zombi 2 star Tisa Farrow as Mary Woodhouse, Fiamma Maglione as Sandra, Aldo Barberito as Father Thomas and Robert Kerman as Mr. Ross; they were replaced by Catriona MacColl, Janet Agren, Fabrizio Jovine and Venantino Venantini, respectively. Agren and Christopher George were specifically hired to increase the film's commercial prospects; Fulci's on-set relationship with the latter was turbulent, leading him to nickname George "the dog with the cigar".

MacColl had recently made her film debut in the title role of the manga adaptation Lady Oscar, and would be cast as the lead in Fulci's later films The Beyond and The House by the Cemetery. When she was approached for the film, she felt that the script was "badly written" and almost declined taking part. "It seemed to me like a series of special effects without a story", she said in an interview in 2011. She called her agent from her hotel room to seek his advice; he told her to take the role, because "nobody was going to see the film anyway"—a prediction that MacColl later noted would prove to be incorrect.

=== Filming ===
Film historian and critic Roberto Curti stated that, according to the Public Cinematographic Register, filming was published as beginning on March 24, but it was more likely that filming had not begun until April 1980. The shooting schedule allowed for shooting on location in New York City and six weeks in Savannah, Georgia, as well as two weeks in Rome at De Paolis Studios for interiors and special effects scenes. The decision to shoot in Savannah was dictated by the film's low budget, particularly to avoid conflict with unions regarding the importation of most of the film's cast and crew.

The scene where Peter smashes open Mary's coffin with a pickaxe was shot in New York, but the interior of the coffin was shot in Rome. MacColl recalled that she would blink every time the pickaxe hit the coffin: "It was just a nervous reaction. And Lucio was getting crosser and crosser. He pulled me out of the coffin and shouted: 'I'll show you how easy it is!' So he climbed into the coffin and did the same shot without blinking. 'If I can do it, you can do it', he said."

=== Special effects ===
The special effects scenes included a scene where the cast is attacked by maggots via two wind machines and 10 kg of maggots. To surprise Fulci, one crew member took some of the maggots and placed them in his pipe tobacco, which Fulci only learned about after a few puffs of what he was smoking, angering him immensely. Fulci would later theorize that this incident led to his future illness, as he underwent heart surgery in 1985, suffered a ventricular aneurysm, contracted viral hepatitis and developed Cirrhosis of the liver.

Many of the film's gory and graphic scenes were not included in the original scripts or story, such as the scene where a character vomits their own intestines. This scene was performed by having Daniela Doria spit up baby veal intestines and then having her head replaced with a replica for further vomiting.

== Release ==
City of the Living Dead was distributed theatrically in Italy by Medusa Distribuzione on 11 August 1980. It grossed a total of 985,238,798 Italian lire domestically, a figure described by Curti as "somewhat disappointing". The film was distributed theatrically throughout Europe, including West Germany on September 11, 1980 and France on December 10, 1980, as well as the Netherlands, Spain and Portugal. The German edit of the film distributed by Alemannia/Arabella was about 10 minutes shorter than the Italian version, removing some dialogue scenes but keeping the gory scenes intact. In Paris, the film was screened as Frayeurs at the Festival international du film et de science-fiction. At the festival, the film won the "Grand Prix du Public" (The Audience Award).

The film was released in the United Kingdom on May 7, 1982, where it was passed by the BBFC after the drilling scene was cut. In 2001, the BBFC passed the film uncut with an 18 certificate. In the United States, the film was released on 8 April 1983 and was originally promoted as Twilight of the Dead, which resulted in a cease and desist order from United Film Distribution Company, due to the title's similarity to their own film, George A. Romero's Dawn of the Dead. This resulted in the distributor, Motion Picture Marketing, withdrawing the film and re-releasing it with a new title, The Gates of Hell.

=== Home media ===
In West Germany, the film became part of a press campaign against the home video distribution of violent films. This was part of a June 1984 news report on channel ZDF titled Mama, Papa, Zombie - Horror für den Hausgebrauch, about the availability of violent films to minors. Prior to this screening, horror films such as Maniac and The Beyond were released uncensored in Germany. However, following this report, City of the Living Dead was banned in West Germany, while VHS tapes of the film released in 1983 (under the title Ein Zombie hing am Glockenseil) were confiscated after a 1986 hearing by the District Court of Munich. Continuous re-releases of the film in West Germany with content removed led to truncated releases of the film as late as 2001 in Germany.

The film was released on DVD in the United States by Anchor Bay in 2000, and on DVD and Blu-ray by Blue Underground in 2010. In 2018, Arrow Video released a limited edition 4K remaster of both the City and the Gates versions in the United Kingdom. In 2020, the Gates version was given a Blu-ray release in the United States as an online exclusive item.

== Reception ==
=== Contemporary ===
A reviewer in the Italian newspaper La Stampa referred to the film as "not recommended for easily impressionable viewers" and added that the film was a sign that Fulci had "reached expressive maturity", with a story that grew progressively to make an "expressive nightmarish atmosphere", concluding that the film was a "grand guignol spectacle". Giovanna Grassi of Corriere della Sera found the film too dependent on gore, lacking atmosphere, and "incoherent and stretched beyond measure". The review went on to praise actor Giovanni Lombardo Radice and Frizzi's score. A review by Pierre Gires of L'Écran fantastique found that the film left viewers in a series of "bloody and hallucinatory events that leave little room to breathe" and was "very well edited, with a lively pace". The review concluded that the film was a "definitive film after which it will be useless to revisit the same subject matter", and that it "ranks Lucio Fulci amongst the best craftsmen of the certain branch of the fantastique".

Geoff Andrews of Time Out found the film "laughably awful" with a "nonsensical plot", and that it "could just conceivably be the disreputable movie that surrealists would have loved." John Pym of the Monthly Film Bulletin called it a "silly, meandering horror" film, concluding that "there is not much to discuss and little to recommend." Alan Jones of Starburst praised the film as being "what popular cinema was all about", adding that "Shadow, claustrophobic atmosphere [and] full on menace is the crux of this and there is no doubt in my mind that Fulci is the master of such manipulation." Jones went on to call out negative reception of Fulci, stating that anyone who described Fulci as a hack annoyed him, noting that "in each of his recent films he has made, there are so many worthwhile merits. At this stage in the game his talent cannot be called merely accidental."

In the United States, some critics derided the acting in the film, including J.A. Conner of the Santa Cruz Sentinel ("intense overacting"), Tom Brown of the Times Recorder ("horribly acted") and Eleanor Ringel of The Atlanta Constitution, with the latter stating that the only appeal of the film was in seeing the predominantly European cast attempting to adjust to "Fulci's muddled vision of Middle America". More critics dismissed the film due to its violent scenes, such as Jay Carr of the Boston Globe ("a film only a diehard necrophile could love"), Dick Fleming of The Daily Times ("scenes purely for the sake of shock value") and Ringel declaring it an "idiotic sleaze fest with nothing to offer but an abundance of filmed animal innards".

=== Retrospective ===
On review aggregator website Rotten Tomatoes, City of the Living Dead currently has an approval rating of 40% based on 15 reviews, with an average rating of 5.80/10.

Bill Gibron of PopMatters called City of the Living Dead one of the most infamous of the films known for their "splatter excess and nihilistic artistic merit" that were released during the onset of the home video era but went on to say, "With a premise that promises more than the movie can ever deliver, The City of the Living Dead might be a disappointment to those hoping for an all out zombie holocaust. Instead, it’s really nothing more than a cinematic stepping stone in Lucio Fulci's growth as the Godfather of Gore." Anton Bitel of Little White Lies felt that the film's plot was "muddied" and that its ending "defies all interpretation" and concluded that City of the Living Dead was ultimately "strange and maddening" and awash in an "uncanny vibe of hermetic irrationality." Ian Berriman of SFX opined that the film's characters were "ciphers" and that its plot was "generally a flimsy pretext for surrealistic outbursts of the irrational" but conceded that it was an otherwise "tremendously atmospheric film" with gore set pieces that were "simply jaw-dropping."

== Bibliography ==
- Curti, Roberto (2019). Italian Gothic Horror Films, 1980-1989. McFarland. ISBN 9781476672434.
- Whitman, Glen; Dow, James (2014). Economics of the Undead: Zombies, Vampires, and the Dismal Science. Rowman & Littlefield. ISBN 9781442235038.
