= Jean-Jacques Debout =

French singer-songwriter (born 1940)

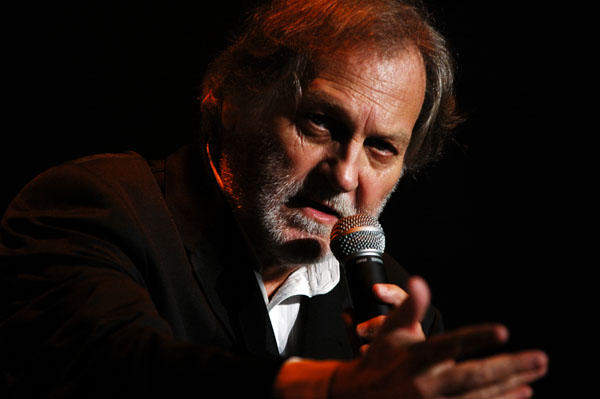
- Debout performing in 2009

Background information
- Born: 9 March 1940 (age 85); Paris, France
- Occupation(s): Singer, songwriter, musician
- Years active: 1963 – present

Jean-Jacques Debout (born 9 March 1940, in Paris) is a French singer-songwriter. In addition to his albums, he has written for a number of renowned artists like Johnny Hallyday, Sylvie Vartan, Dalida, and Chantal Goya. He has also composed a great number of films.

== Personal life ==
He is married to French singer and actress Chantal Goya. They have two children, Jean-Paul and Clarisse.

== Discography ==
- 1965: Les boutons dorés
- 1967: Les cloches d'Ecosse
- 1974: Redeviens Virginie
- 1976: Si tu reviens
- 1989: Depuis 1959... Avec toi
- 1991: Paul et Virginie
- 1996: Best of
- 1997: A Long Island
- 2003: Les Enfants du Paradis
- 2012: Bourlingueur des étoiles
- 2013: Sous le soleil des Guinguettes (peaked in FR: #14, BEL (Wa): #87)
- 2014: Sur le chemin du bonheur

== Filmography ==
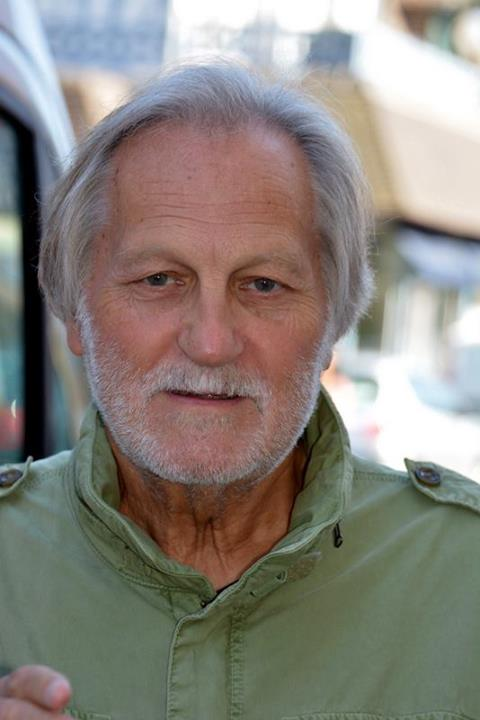
Jean-Jacques Debout (2013)

- 1962: The Dance
- 1963: D'où viens-tu Johnny?
- 1964: Cherchez l'idole as himself
- 2009: Partir as Paul Marais

soundtracks

- 1963: D'où viens-tu Johnny?
- 1966: Masculin, féminin
- 1971: L'amour c'est gai, l'amour c'est triste
- 1979: Le temps des vacances
- 1983: Les parents ne sont pas simples cette année
- 2001: Absolument fabuleux
- 2004: Michel Strogoff
- 2010: Gigola

Themes of TV series and TV films

- 1972: Églantine
- 1979: Les malheurs de Sophie
- 1980: Les Misérables
- 1980: Capitaine Flam
- 1981: Bouba, le petit ourson
- 1984: Les Trois Mousquetaires
- 1984: Les quatre filles du docteur March
- 1987: David le gnome
- 1998: Michel Strogoff
- 2001: Conan, le fils du futur
