= Marlène Jobert =

French actress and author (born 1940)

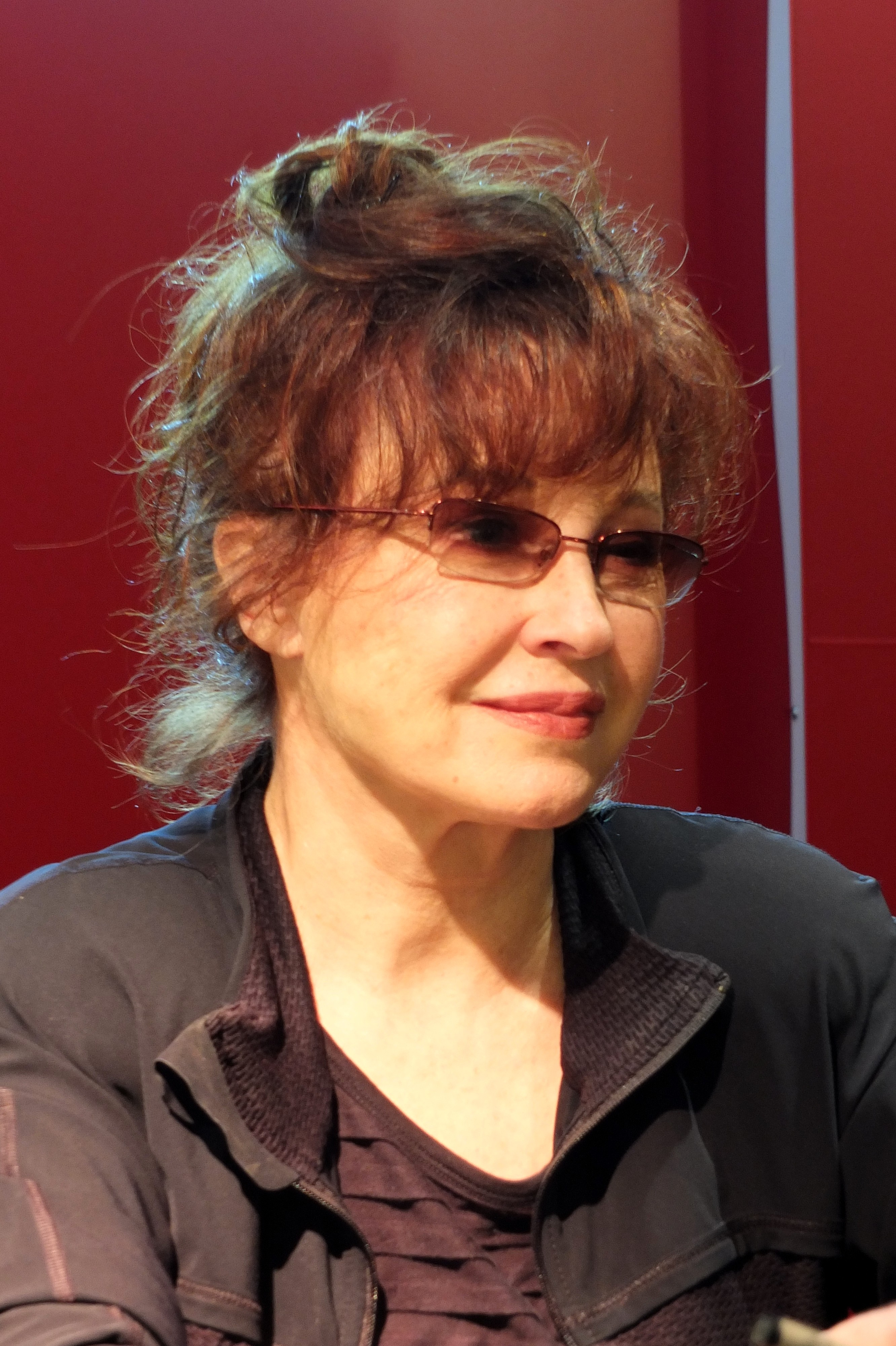
- Marlène Jobert in 2012
- Born: 4 November 1940 (age 86); Algiers, French Algeria
- Occupations: Actress, author
- Years active: 1966–1998
- Spouse: Walter Green
- Children: 2, including Eva Green
- Relatives: Elsa Lunghini (niece); Joséphine Jobert (niece)
- Awards: César d'honneur (2007)

Marlène Jobert (French: [maʁlɛn ʒɔbɛʁ]; born 4 November 1940) is a French author and retired actress.

== Life and career ==
Jobert was born in Algiers, French Algeria, to Charles Jobert, born in Dijon, Côte-d’Or, who served in the French Air Force, and his wife, Éliane Andrée Azulay, born in Birkhadem, who was daughter of Abraham Azulay, born in Algiers, a Sephardi Jewish chair-maker, and his Spanish wife María Joaquina García Martín, born in Bonares, Province of Huelva, Andalusia. She came to Metropolitan France aged eight.

Jobert debuted as an actress on stage and television. In 1968, she achieved stardom by playing starring roles in the successful comedy Faut pas prendre les enfants du bon Dieu pour des canards sauvages and in the drama L'Astragale. She co-starred with Charles Bronson in Rider on the Rain and with Jean-Paul Belmondo in The Married Couple of the Year Two.

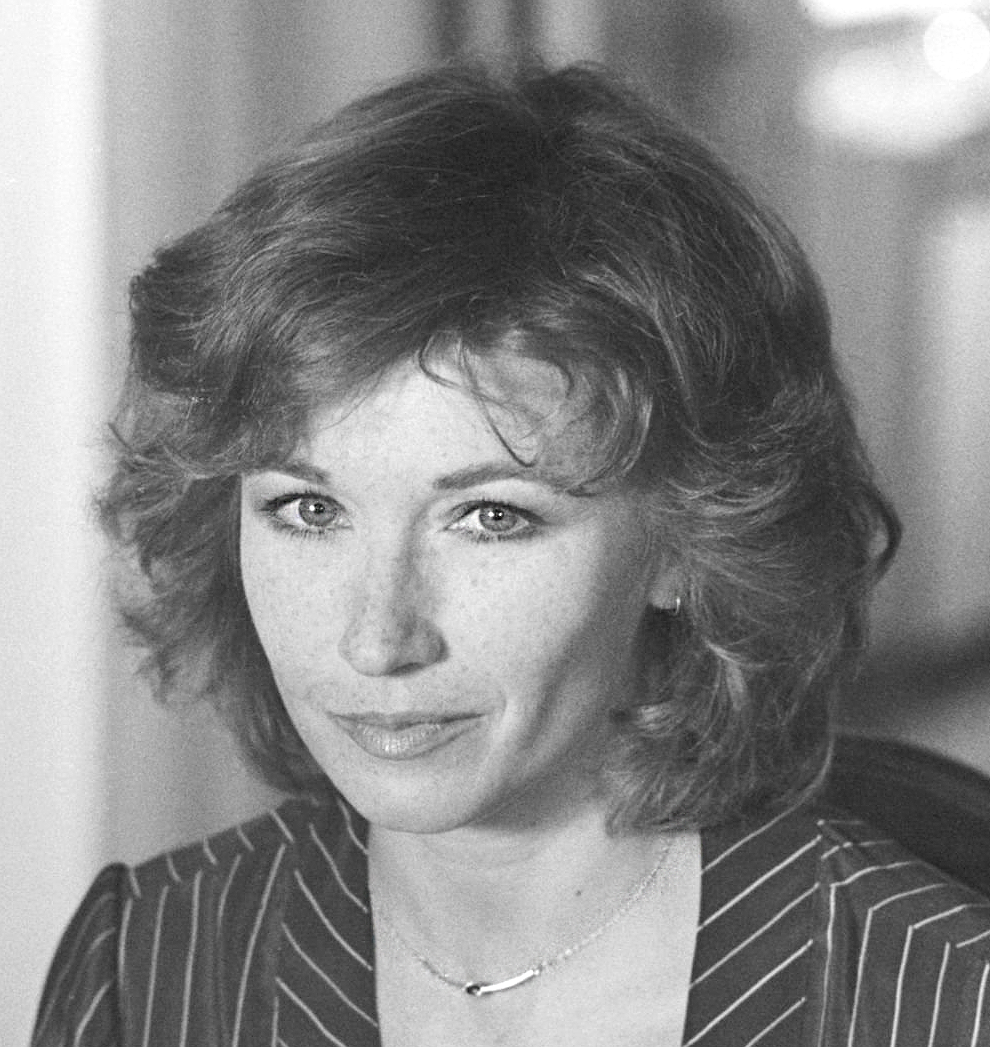
Jobert in 1978

During the 1970s, Jobert was one of France's popular movie actresses. But during the next decade, she gradually withdrew from film work and concentrated on a new career in children's literature. She is the author and/or narrator of (mainly children's) audio books. She also has written a series of books which cautiously lead on to the appreciation of classical music, e.g. of Mozart, Chopin, and Tchaikovsky.

Jobert and spouse Swedish dental surgeon Dr. Walter Green have twin daughters: Eva Green, who is also an actress, and Joy Green, who is a horse breeder in Italy. Her niece Joséphine Jobert is an actress known for the television show Death in Paradise.

== Selected filmography ==
- Therese Desqueyroux (1962), at the end of the film in the scene at the Parisian café
- Martin Soldat (aka Kiss Me General) (1966),Director: Michel Deville
- Masculin Féminin (1966), with Jean-Pierre Léaud, Chantal Goya. Director: Jean-Luc Godard
- Very Happy Alexander (Alexandre le bienheureux) (1968), with Philippe Noiret, Françoise Brion. Director: Yves Robert
- Leontine (1968), with Françoise Rosay, Bernard Blier. Director : Michel Audiard
- L'Astragale (1968), with Horst Buchholz, Magali Noël. Director: Guy Casaril
- Rider on the Rain (Le Passager de la Pluie) (1970), with Charles Bronson, Annie Cordy, Jill Ireland. Director: René Clément
- Last Known Address (Dernier Domicile Connu) (1970), with Lino Ventura. Director: José Giovanni.
- The Married Couple of the Year Two (Les Mariés de l'An 2) (1971), with Jean-Paul Belmondo, Laura Antonelli. Director: Jean-Paul Rappeneau
- Touch and Go (La Pourdre d'escampette) (1971), with Michael York, Michel Piccoli. Director: Philippe de Broca
- To Catch a Spy (1971), with Kirk Douglas, Trevor Howard. Director: Dick Clement
- Ten Days' Wonder (La Décade prodigieuse) (1972), with Orson Welles, Anthony Perkins, Michel Piccoli. Director: Claude Chabrol
- We Won't Grow Old Together (Nous Ne Vieillirons Pas Ensemble) (1972), with Jean Yanne. Director: Maurice Pialat
- Juliette and Juliette (Juliette et Juliette) (1974), with Annie Girardot and Pierre Richard. Director: Remo Forlani
- The Secret (Le Secret) (1974), with Jean-Louis Trintignant, Philippe Noiret. Director: Robert Enrico
- Pas si méchant que ça (The Wonderful Crook) (1975), with Gérard Depardieu. Director: Claude Goretta
- Folle à tuer (Mad Enough to Kill) (1975), with Tomas Milian, Thomas Waintrop. Director: Yves Boisset
- The Good and the Bad (Le Bon et les Méchants) (1976), with Jacques Dutronc, Jacques Villeret, Bruno Cremer, Brigitte Fossey. Director: Claude Lelouch
- Julie pot de colle (Julie Gluepot) (1977), with Jean-Claude Brialy, Alexandra Stewart. Director: Philippe de Broca
- The Accuser (L'Imprécateur) (1977), with Jean Yanne, Michel Piccoli, Robert Webber. Director: Jean-Louis Bertucelli
- Va voir maman, papa travaille (Your Turn, My Turn) (1978), with Philippe Léotard. Director: François Leterrier
- A Dangerous Toy (Il Giocattolo) (1979), with Nino Manfredi. Director: Giuliano Montaldo
- Grandison (1979), with Jean Rochefort, Helmut Qualtinger. Director: Achim Kurz
- The Police War (1979), with Claude Brasseur, Claude Rich, Jean-François Stévenin. Director: Robin Davis
- Effraction (1983), with Jacques Villeret, Bruno Cremer. Director: Daniel Duval
- Les Cavaliers de l'orage (1984), with Gérard Klein, Vittorio Mezzogiorno, Wadeck Stanczak. Director: Gérard Vergez
