= To Catch a Spy =

- Original British quad poster by Arnaldo Putzu
- Directed by: Dick Clement
- Written by: Dick Clement; Ian La Frenais
- Based on: Catch Me a Spy by George Marton & Tibor Méray
- Produced by: Pierre Braunberger; Steven Pallos
- Starring: Kirk Douglas; Marlène Jobert; Trevor Howard; Tom Courtenay
- Cinematography: Christopher Challis
- Edited by: John Bloom
- Music by: Claude Bolling
- Production companies: The Bryna Company; Ludgate Films; Capitole Films; Les Films de la Pléiade
- Distributed by: Rank Film Distributors
- Release date: 6 September 1971
- Running time: 94 minutes
- Countries: United Kingdom; France; United States
- Language: English

To Catch a Spy is a 1971 comedy spy film directed by Dick Clement and starring Kirk Douglas, Marlène Jobert, Trevor Howard, Richard Pearson, Garfield Morgan, Angharad Rees and Robert Raglan. It was written by Clement and Ian La Frenais. The story is based on the 1969 novel Catch Me a Spy by George Marton and Tibor Méray.

It was a co-production between Britain, the United States and France, which was filmed in Bucharest, Romania. It was also part filmed on Loch Awe and Loch Etive, Scotland, where the gunboat scenes were filmed, and featured Kirk Douglas running through a herd of Highland cattle which were owned by David Fellowes. It was also released as Catch Me a Spy and Keep Your Fingers Crossed.

== Plot ==
Fabienne, a young French-born British schoolteacher marries and heads to Bucharest in the Eastern Bloc for their honeymoon. Her husband is arrested by secret police and soon turns out to have been detained by Soviet intelligence as a spy. She intends to head to Moscow to try and help him, but instead is drugged and sent on a plane back to England by a seemingly suspicious waiter.

Back in London she lobbies her uncle, the Shadow Foreign Secretary and his friend the head of British Intelligence, to help get her husband back. He explains that they have deliberately arrested her husband in order to have a bargaining chip to exchange for a top Soviet agent who has recently been unmasked by the British. Unbeknownst to Fabienne, her husband, a corrupt businessman, is in league with the Soviet intelligence and has married her on their instructions. The exchange in Germany goes wrong, however, when during the handover the Soviet spy - laden down with capitalist consumer goods from the West - sinks through the ice and drowns.

As the British now have nobody to exchange for her husband, Fabienne sets out to capture an enemy agent on her own initiative. She manages to trap a man in a trench coat who has been following her all day, only for him to prove to be an incompetent British agent ordered to trail her for her own security by his chiefs. When Andrej the Bucharest waiter reemerges, having been caught rummaging through her room and demanding she hand over a microfilm that he inserted into her luggage when he had her drugged in Bucharest, she decides he will be the ideal person to exchange. However, before she can take action they both end up being abducted by enemy agents, only escaping in the Scottish countryside. He reveals to her that he is not really a spy, but he makes money smuggling manuscripts of books by Soviet dissidents to the West.

Because the Soviets want to get their hands on him, they plant evidence in his hotel room indicating that he is one of their spies. Special Branch arrest him and agree to a new prisoner exchange, over Fabienne's protests. The final exchange on a lake on the East German border descends into chaos and a motorboat chase.

== Cast ==
- Kirk Douglas as Andrej
- Marlène Jobert as Fabienne
- Trevor Howard as Sir Trevor Dawson
- Tom Courtenay as Baxter Clarke
- Patrick Mower as John Fenton
- Bernadette Lafont as Simone
- Bernard Blier as Webb
- Sacha Pitoëff as Stefan
- Richard Pearson as Haldane
- Wilfrid Brambell as Beech
- Garfield Morgan as the husband
- Angharad Rees as Victoria
- Isabel Dean as Celia
- Jonathan Cecil as British attaché
- Robin Parkinson as British officer
- Jean Gilpin as ground stewardess
- Robert Raglan as ambassador
- Bridget Turner as woman in plane
- Trevor Peacock as man in plane
- Clive Cazes as Rumanian in plane
- Ashley Knight as 1st schoolboy
- Philip DaCosta as 2nd schoolboy
- Robert Gillespie as man in lift
- Sheila Steafel as woman in lift
- Bunny May as lift operator
- Fiona Moore as Russian birl
- Bernice Stegers as Russian girl
- Dinny Powell as 1st heavy
- Del Baker as 2nd heavy
- Ishaq Bux as Arab at party (uncredited)
- Cheryl Hall as Clarke's girlfriend (uncredited)

== Production ==
It was shot at Twickenham Studios and on location in London, Loch Leven and in Bucharest. The school football match was shot at Vincent Square. The film's sets were designed by the art director Carmen Dillon. It was made as a co-production between several British, American, and French companies, including Kirk Douglas's Bryna Productions, Nat Wachsberger's two film production companies, England-based Ludgate Films and France-based Capitole Films, as well as Pierre Braunberger's French film production company Les Films de la Pléiade. In May 1971, Rank Film Distributors picked up the option to distribute To Catch a Spy in the United Kingdom, while Films Around the World would do the same for the American market.

The "gunboats" in the film were:- Lalage, a 70 ft WW2 Fairmile harbor defense launch, the East German boat, and the Calshot Salar, a 60 ft WW2 Royal Air Force "three leg" pinnace, the British boat.

Lalage was owned and operated by Captain Jack Glover of Dumbarton, who in addition was an extra in the film, as was his brother Hans Glover. Tragically, Captain Glover drowned in 1982 while undertaking a boat salvage operation in the river Leven. Lalage eventually foundered off the Little Cubrae island after striking rocks during a severe storm and became a total loss.

Calshot Salar, was owned by Dr W."Bill" Souter and operated during filming by a Canadian, Captain Robin Blair-Crawford, who also had a position as an actor in the movie and in addition was the lead safety diver at Loch Etive. At the insistence of her owner Calshot Salar had her original RAF number painted on the hull for the movie. After numerous adventures in both home and overseas waters Calshot Salar was sold and eventually became a houseboat at Shoreham.

== Critical reception ==
TV Guide wrote the film "features a good cast, an exciting speedboat chase, a few chuckles, and every spy cliche in the book"; and Radio Times noted "a sometimes clever and witty script by the ace TV team of Dick Clement and Ian La Frenais. However, it's rather let down by Clement's uncertain direction. Another problem is that, as a Bucharest waiter who is actually a spy, Kirk Douglas's peculiar intensity isn't best suited to a comedy. Trevor Howard and Tom Courtenay seem more at home with the spy spoof material."

== See also ==
- List of American films of 1971

== Bibliography ==
- Simon James. London Film Location Guide. Anova Books, 2007.
