= Frederick Stafford =

Czechoslovak-born actor (1928–1979)

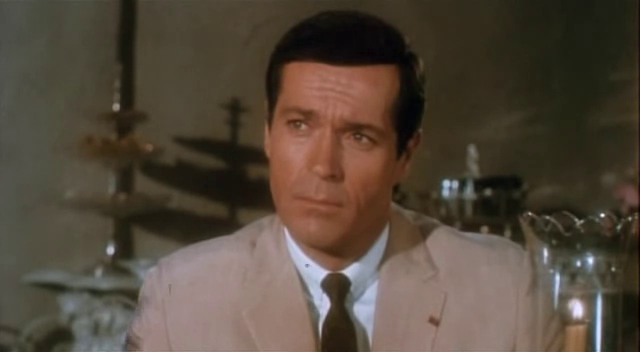
- Stafford in Topaz (1969)
- Born: Friedrich Strobel von Stein; 11 March 1928; Piešťany, Czechoslovakia (present-day Slovakia)
- Died: 28 July 1979 (aged 51) near Lake Sarnen, Switzerland
- Occupation: Actor
- Years active: 1965–1977
- Spouse: Marianne Hold (m. 1964)
- Children: 1

Frederick Stafford (born Friedrich Strobel von Stein; 11 March 1928 – 28 July 1979) was a Slovak-Australian actor. He was known as a leading man in Eurospy films, particularly as Hubert Bonnisseur de la Bath / OSS 117, and for his starring role in the Alfred Hitchcock film Topaz (1969).

== Biography ==
=== Early life ===
By some accounts, Stafford claimed to have played water polo at the 1948 Summer Olympics.

He was the son of a Slovak factory owner. He studied chemistry and spent time in Switzerland. He was worried about the Russians taking over Czechoslovakia and in 1948 decided to leave. It would take too long to move to the US or Canada so he went to Australia in 1949. While there he changed his name to "Frederick Stafford". "I always liked the name," he later said.

He became a taxi driver, a lumberjack and a businessman. He qualified as a doctor of chemistry after university in Sydney and Perth. Fluent in five languages, in the 1950s he held a series of positions in the pharmaceutical industry.

By 1962 he was a regional manager for Bristol Meyers headquartered in Hong Kong. He travelled for them in the Middle East and Far East. Two years later in Bangkok he met a German actress Marianne Hold and married her seven days later.

=== Film career ===
In 1964 French director André Hunebelle discovered Stafford on holiday at a hotel in Bangkok and asked him "How would you like to make movies with me?" Stafford replied, "Why not?"

According to another account "I married an Austrian girl in Bangkok in 1964 and among the bouquets at the wedding was one from a French film producer. He said he wanted me to star in his films. That's how it all began. I was rushed off to Brazil to make my first film in Rio de Janeiro, and have been busy ever since."

He played a starring role in his first film, replacing Kerwin Mathews as an agent code-named OSS 117 in OSS 117 Mission for a Killer (1965) with Mylène Demongeot. The film was the eleventh biggest movie of the year in France.

"Getting into a different industry didn't have a big effect on me," said Stafford later. "I don't think it made a difference because I didn't get into business at an early age when a man is still being formed... I don't know if there is such a thing as luck... Maybe in a lottery but you have to get out and buy the ticket first."

He followed this with the similar Agent 505: Death Trap in Beirut (1965) and a second OSS117 film, Atout cœur à Tokyo pour OSS 117 (1966).

Stafford made a macaroni combat war film in Italy, Dirty Heroes (1967) with John Ireland. He followed it with Estouffade à la Caraïbe (1967), and L'Homme qui valait des milliards (1967).

Stafford made two more Italian war films, The Battle of El Alamein (1969) with Michael Rennie.

=== Topaz ===
These movies brought the attention of Alfred Hitchcock, who signed him in 1968 to play the leading role as agent André Devereaux in Topaz (1969). Universal signed him to a non exclusive contract for seven years. In the role of the secret agent, he led an ensemble of first-rate European actors who were his film partners in a very complex role: Dany Robin was his wife, Claude Jade played his daughter, Michel Subor as his son-in-law, Michel Piccoli and Philippe Noiret were the spies he had to expose and Karin Dor played the role of the Cuban mistress. His contractor was played by the American John Forsythe.

The film was not a success. The casting of Stafford, whose performance was found lacking by critics, was largely blamed for its failure. Channel4 claimed, "Heading the international cast is a very wooden Stafford, who is no Cary Grant."

He made Eagles Over London (1969) with Van Johnson.

In March 1970 Stafford claimed that Harry Saltzman wanted him to play James Bond in On Her Majesty's Secret Service but he was unable to accept due to his commitment to make Topaz. He said "although at first I thought no one could take over from Sean. But after seeing the latest Bond film... I know I can." He added "I certainly didn't realise this film business would keep my interest like it has. It is a real change from chemistry, and at present I can't see myself going back to that."

=== Later career ===
He made a comeback in 1972 as Commissario Luca Micelli in the Italian giallo Shadows Unseen.

Five years after Topaz, he starred with French actress Claude Jade (who had played his daughter in Topaz) in the Italian thriller Special Killers (1973). In that movie, Stafford's character has a brief platonic romance with Jade's character despite a 20-year age difference.

His last successes were the Italian movies Metti che ti rompo il muso (1975), White Horses of Summer (1975, starring Jean Seberg, his co-star from 1966's Estouffade à la Caraïbe), Werewolf Woman (1976) and the Spanish-Italian-French coproduction Hold-Up (1977). He also made La trastienda and Sfida sul fondo.

In 1977, Stafford returned to Australia after 15 years. He announced he intended to make four films in Australia including one about the pyjama girl murder; Our Man in Sydney, a detective thriller, and Andamooka, about life on the Australian opal fields.

== Personal life ==
He married German actress Marianne Hold whom he met while they were in Bangkok. His son is the singer Roderick Stafford, who was born in 1964.

== Death ==
Stafford died in 1979 in a collision of two aircraft above Lake Sarnen, Switzerland. A Morane-Saulnier Rallye piloted by Czech-born Pavel Krahulec, in which Stafford was a passenger, collided with a Piper aircraft piloted by businessman Alois Fischer of Thoune, Switzerland.

== Films ==
Year	Title	Roles	Director	co-starring	Notes
1965	OSS 117 Mission for a Killer	Hubert Bonnisseur de la Bath, alias OSS 117	André Hunebelle	Mylène Demongeot, Raymond Pellegrin	
1966	Agent 505: Death Trap in Beirut	Richard Blake / Agent 505	Manfred R. Köhler	Geneviève Cluny, Harald Leipnitz, Willy Birgel	
1966	Atout coeur à Tokyo pour OSS 117	Hubert Bonisseur de La Bath, alias OSS 117	Michel Boisrond	Marina Vlady	
1967	Dirty Heroes	Joe Mortimer, Sesame	Alberto De Martino	Daniela Bianchi, Curd Jürgens, Adolfo Celi, Michel Constantin, John Ireland	
1967	The Looters	Sam Morgan	Jacques Besnard	Jean Seberg	
1967	L'Homme qui valait des milliards	Jean Sarton	Michel Boisrond	Anny Duperey, Peter van Eyck, Raymond Pellegrin	
1969	The Battle of El Alamein	Lt. Giorgio Borri	Giorgio Ferroni	George Hilton, Robert Hossein, Michael Rennie, Princess Ira von Fürstenberg	
1969	Eagles Over London	Captain Paul Stevens	Enzo G. Castellari	Van Johnson, Francisco Rabal	
1969	Topaz	Andre Devereaux	Alfred Hitchcock	Dany Robin, Claude Jade, Karin Dor, John Vernon, John Forsythe, Michel Piccoli, Philippe Noiret	
1972	Shadows Unseen	Commissioner Luca Miceli	Camillo Bazzoni	Marilù Tolo, Reinhard Kolldehoff, Raymond Pellegrin, Judy Winter	
1973	La ragazza di via Condotti (Special Killers)	Sandro Mattei	Germán Lorente	Claude Jade, Michel Constantin	
1973	Metti che ti rompo il muso	Rocky Miller	Giuseppe Vari	Silvia Monti, Massimo Mollica	
1974	Hold-Up	Robert Cunningham	Germán Lorente	Nathalie Delon, Marcel Bozzuffi	
1975	White Horses of Summer	Nicholas Kingsburg	Raimondo Del Balzo	Jean Seberg	
1975	La trastienda	Doctor Navarro	Jorge Grau	Rosanna Schiaffino	
1976	Werewolf Woman	Inspector Modica	Rino Di Silvestro	Dagmar Lassander	
1976	Sfida sul fondo	Valdesio	Melciade Coletti	Dagmar Lassander	(final film role)
