= Euro War =

Subgenre of war films

Euro War, also known as Macaroni Combat, Macaroni War, Spaghetti Combat, or Spaghetti War, is a broad subgenre of war film that emerged in the mid-1960s. The films were named Euro War because most were European co-productions, most notably and commonly by Italians, as indicated by the subgenre's other nicknames that draw parallels to those films within the mostly Italian Spaghetti Western genre.

The typical team was made up of an Italian director, Italo-Spanish technical staff, and a cast of Italian and Spanish actors and sometimes German and French, sometimes a minor or fading Hollywood star. The films were primarily shot in Europe and later, the Philippines.

== History ==
From the mid-1960s, much like in the case of the Italian spaghetti western in relation to American Hollywood Westerns, the Macaroni Combat film mimicked the success of American and British films such as The Guns of Navarone, The Dirty Dozen and Where Eagles Dare. Like spaghetti westerns, Euro War films were characterized by their production in the Italian language, low budgets, added violence, and a recognizable highly fluid and minimalist cinematography. This was partly intentional and partly the context and cultural background of the filmmakers. Throughout the 1960s and 1970s the films were almost all set during World War II with a few about mercenaries in Africa following the success of Dark of the Sun and later, The Wild Geese. In the 1980s most entries in the genre were set during the Vietnam War following the success of The Deer Hunter and Apocalypse Now.

Some were also made to capitalize the success of Vietnam War rescue mission movies like Missing in Action, Uncommon Valor and Rambo: First Blood Part II. Some were also made to capitalize on the success of movies having American involvement in Middle East missions against terrorist activities like The Delta Force and Death Before Dishonor, Delta Force Commando. Some were also made to capitalize on the success of Soviet Afghan war movies like Rambo III and Delta Force Commando 2. Two popular examples of the Italian-made World War II films were Anzio (1968) and Hornets' Nest (1970) with their A-list cast members. Today, one of the better-known films to fit the Macaroni Combat archetype is the 1978 film The Inglorious Bastards directed by Enzo G. Castellari. Influenced heavily by the aforementioned 1967 American film, The Dirty Dozen, it would later inspire Quentin Tarantino's 2009 film Inglourious Basterds, an American-produced film influenced by the genre as a whole.

== Films ==
- Some Like It Cold (1960)
- Under Ten Flags (1960)
- Then There Were Three (1961)
- The Best of Enemies (1961)
- La guerra continua (Warriors Five) (1962)
- Torpedo Bay (1962)
- Marcia o Crepa (The Legion's Last Patrol / Commando) (1962)
- The Shortest Day (1962)
- I due colonnelli (Two Colonels) (1962)
- The Changing of the Guard (1962)
- Attack and Retreat (Italiani brava gente) (1964)
- War Italian Style (1966)
- Dirty Heroes (1967)
- Desert Commandos (1967)
- Hell in Normandy (1967)
- Commandos (1968)
- Suicide Commandos (1968)
- Quella dannata pattuglia (The Battle of the Damned) (1968)
- Anzio (1968)
- Battle of the Last Panzer (1969)
- The Red Berets (1969)
- Eagles Over London (1969)
- Salt in the Wound (1969)
- Bridge over the Elbe (1969)
- The Battle of El Alamein (1969)
- 36 Hours to Hell (1969)
- Desert Assault (1969)
- Hora cero: Operación Rommel (A Bullet For Rommel / The Battle Giants) (1969)
- La legione dei dannati (Battle of the Commandos / Legion of the Damned) (1969)
- Five for Hell (1969)
- War Devils (1969)
- Churchill's Leopards (1970)
- Hornets' Nest (1970)
- Heroes in Hell (1973)
- The Heroes (1973)
- Hell River (1974)
- The Inglorious Bastards (1978)
- Battle Force (1978)
- The Wild Geese Attack Again (1978)
- Tough to Kill (1978)
- From Hell to Victory (1979)
- The Last Hunter (1980)
- Odd Squad (1981)
- Tiger Joe (1982)
- Last Blood (1983)
- Code Name: Wild Geese (1984)
- Kommando Leopard (1985)
- Operation Nam (1986)
- Strike Commando (1987)
- Delta Force Commando (1988)
- Last Platoon (1988)
- Strike Commando 2 (1988)
- Striker (1988)
- Born to Fight (1989)
- Casablanca Express (1989)
- Leathernecks (1989)

== Personalities ==
=== Actors ===
- Lewis Collins
- Richard Harrison
- George Hilton
- Klaus Kinski
- Guy Madison
- Frederick Stafford
- Bo Svenson
- Lee Van Cleef
- David Warbeck
- Fred Williamson
- Jack Palance
- Rod Taylor

=== Directors ===
- Enzo G. Castellari
- Umberto Lenzi
- Antonio Margheriti
- Roberto Bianchi Montero

== See also ==
- Partisan film
