= From Hell to Victory =

- French theatrical poster
- Directed by: Umberto Lenzi
- Story by: Umberto Lenzi
- Produced by: Edmondo Amati
- Starring: George Peppard; George Hamilton; Horst Bucholz; Anny Duperey; Jean-Pierre Cassel; Ray Lovelock; Sam Wanamaker; Capucine
- Cinematography: Jose Luis Alcaine
- Edited by: Vincenzo Tomasi
- Music by: Riz Ortolani
- Production companies: José Frade Producciones; Les Films Princesse; Les Productions Jacques Roitfeld; New Films
- Distributed by: Titanus (Italy); Warner Bros. (France)
- Release date: 30 May 1979 (France)
- Running time: 100 minutes
- Countries: France; Italy; Spain
- Languages: English; German; French

From Hell to Victory (Italian: Contro 4 bandiere, French: De l'enfer à la victoire, Spanish: De Dunkerke a la victoria) is a 1979 Euro War film directed by Umberto Lenzi and produced by Edmondo Amati. The international cast stars George Peppard, George Hamilton, Horst Buchholz, Anny Duperey, Jean-Pierre Cassel, Ray Lovelock, Sam Wanamaker, and Capucine. The screenplay by frequent Lenzi collaborators Gianfranco Clerici and José Luis Martínez Mollá is based on a story co-authored by the director. The film was a co-production between Italy, Spain, and France.

The plot follows a group of six friends of different nationalities who are forced apart on different sides during World War II. It depicts a number of historical wartime episodes including the Battle of Dunkirk and the Liberation of Paris.

== Plot ==
On August 24, 1939, six friends take drinks in a suburb of Paris; Americans Brett Rosson and Ray MacDonald, the French Maurice Bernard and Fabienne Bodin, German Jürgen Dietrich, and Englishman Dick Sanders. Despite the looming threat of war, the six resolve to meet again annually at this same location. Eight days later, Germany invades Poland, and the six are forced to go their separate ways.

In the spring of 1940, Germany conquers France. Dick and Maurice narrowly survive the evacuation of Dunkirk, whereupon Maurice promptly joins the Free French Forces while Dick is assigned to a new Royal Air Force (RAF) unit. Fabienne has joined a French resistance cell, Ray is embedded in the RAF command as a war correspondent, and Jürgen is an officer in the German occupation force. Brett’s estranged son Jim enlists in the United States Army, intent on becoming a commando. Brett, an agent with the Office of Strategic Services (OSS), is initially ambivalent about Jim’s decision, but eventually decides to put in his requested recommendation, hoping it will help them reconnect. Maurice and Ray briefly reunite in London, where Ray is living with his daughter Mary, a Women's Auxiliary Air Force (WAAF) officer, and the two wonder where the rest of their group is, and whether they’ll ever be able to reunite.

Jürgen and Fabienne eventually meet when he saves her from arrest by the Gestapo. The two make love, but Fabienne maintains that the two cannot be together because their countries are enemies, much to Jürgen’s disappointment. Meanwhile, Jim is dispatched with his unit behind enemy lines to sabotage German supply lines, a mission that leads to his meeting Maurice. The operation is successful, but the rest of the unit is killed in the process, and Jim and Maurice are forced into hiding with local French partisans.

They are smuggled to the château of Nicole Levin, an old flame of Brett’s and partisan sympathizer. Nicole hopes she and Brett might meet again, but her hopes are cut short when Waffen SS troops arrive to arrest Nicole on suspicion of her guerrilla activities. Nicole gives Jim his father’s old cigarette case and asks him to speak to Brett for her. As Maurice and Jim hide in the cellar, Nicole is killed along with her servants when they try to intervene. Meanwhile in the skies above London, Dick is shot down and killed defending the city from the Blitz, only hours after briefly reuniting with Brett. Brett receives his cigarette case along with a letter from Jim, who expresses a desire to spend more time with him once the war is over.

In the lead-up to the D-Day invasion of June 6, 1944, Brett successfully leads a mission in the Nazi-occupied Netherlands to destroy a V-2 rocket fuel manufacturing plant, significantly damaging German defensive capabilities and ensuring a successful invasion. Ray is unable to accompany his daughter to the front due to medical treatment for complications from his alcoholism, but manages to come to terms with it and part on good terms with Mary. Fabienne, meanwhile, bombs a German base, calling Jürgen beforehand to meet her across the street to spare him. She is subsequently found out and arrested trying to escape.

In the final Allied push for Paris, three of the friends unknowingly cross paths as American infantry skirmish with German panzer units commanded by Jürgen. Maurice and Jim fend off the tanks on the ground as Brett and his OSS men call in air support from a nearby hill. Despite Jürgen’s attempt to rush the American trenches and overwhelm them, the arrival of reinforcements overwhelms his panzers. Brett unknowingly kills Jürgen by firing on his command tank with a bazooka, and Jim is mortally wounded by a stray explosion. He dies with his father and Maurice by his side.

Paris is liberated on August 25, 1944, freeing Fabienne from prison. Brett and Maurice arrive, alone, at the same spot they had met five years prior. As Brett offers a toast to Dick, Ray, Jürgen, and Fabienne, the latter arrives on foot. The three embrace, together at last.

== Cast ==
- George Peppard as Brett Rosson
- George Hamilton as Maurice Bernard
- Horst Buchholz as Jürgen Dietrich
- Ray Lovelock as Jim Rosson
- Anny Duperey as Fabienne Bodin
- Sam Wanamaker as Ray MacDonald
- Capucine as Nicole Levine
- Jean-Pierre Cassel as Dick Sanders
- George Claisse as Karl Wessel
- May Heatherly as WAAF Lt. Mary Jennings
- Howard Vernon as SS Major Karl
- Ritza Brown as Amanda
- Franco Fantasia as Captain Vanderkreut
- Andrè Lawrence as Jean
- Lambert Wilson as Patrice
- Henri Voletti as Pierre
- Franco Fantasia as Lars
- Stelio Candelli as Diver

== Production ==
The screenplay is credited to Anthony Fritz, while the Monthly Film Bulletin noted that some sources credits Umberto Lenzi, Gianfranco Clerici and Jose Luis Martinez Molls. Some internationally distributed versions credit Umberto Lenzi under the pseudonym "Hank Milestone".

Exterior filming locations include Paris and Spain, with interiors at Cinecittà Studios. The opening sequence was shot in Casa de Campo park in Madrid. The film also uses stock footage from several other Euro War films, including Eagles Over London and The Inglorious Bastards.

== Reception ==
The Monthly Film Bulletin noted that they had to "admire the resourcefulness of a relatively low-budget production which still runs to a quite respectable crowd of extras and such details as a genuine vintage fire engine in the London blitz scene" and that "taken on the level of a ripping yarn, From Hell to Victory is really quite amiable, although the routine script and direction make everything much more predictable than it need have been".
