= G.I. Bro =

G.I. Bro may refer to:

- Quel maledetto treno blindato, an Italian war film released as G.I. Bro in the United States
- Al Phillips, retired professional wrestler
- Booker Huffman, professional wrestler
