= Hold-Up (1974 film) =

Hold Up
- Directed by: Germán Lorente
- Screenplay by: Adriano Asti; Germán Lorente
- Starring: Frederick Stafford
- Cinematography: Mario Capriotti
- Edited by: Carlo Reali
- Music by: Franco Micalizzi
- Release date: 1974
- Countries: Italy; Spain; France
- Language: Italian

Hold Up (Italian: Hold-Up - Istantanea di una rapina, Spanish: Atraco en la Costa Azul) is a 1974 Italian-Spanish-French crime film directed by Germán Lorente and starring Frederick Stafford and Nathalie Delon.

== Cast ==
- Frederick Stafford as Robert Cunningham
- Nathalie Delon as Judith
- Marcel Bozzuffi as Steve Duggins
- Alberto de Mendoza as Ashley
- Enrico Maria Salerno as Mark Gavin
- Calisto Calisti as policeman
- Manuel de Blas as criminal

== Reception ==
Italian film critic Roberto Curti described the film as "A sort of companion piece to Special Killers [...] a rather bland film noir which doesn’t do much with its intriguing idea and flashback-ridden plot, barely reminiscent of Cornell Woolrich's classic novel The Black Curtain."
