= The Beast (1974 film) =

1974 film directed by Sergio Corbucci

- Official Teaser Poster
- Directed by: Sergio Corbucci
- Written by: Luciano Vincenzoni; Sergio Donati
- Produced by: Carlo Ponti
- Starring: Giancarlo Giannini; Michel Constantin; Giuseppe Maffioli; Giuliana Calandra
- Cinematography: Giuseppe Rotunno
- Edited by: Eugenio Alabiso
- Music by: Guido & Maurizio De Angelis
- Production companies: Champion; PECF
- Distributed by: Warner-Columbia Filmverleih
- Release date: 20 November 1974
- Running time: 100 minutes
- Countries: Italy; France
- Language: Italian

The Beast (Italian: Il bestione) is an Italian comedy directed by Sergio Corbucci and stars Gabriella Giorgelli, Michel Constantin and Giancarlo Giannini.

== Plot ==
An older and younger truck driver, Sandro and Nino, begin to work with each other. They alternate driving their company's vehicle across central and Eastern Europe. After witnessing the harsh treatment of an older colleague, forced to retire on medical grounds and led to suicide by his illness and indigence after a life of hard work, Nino convinces Sandro to take up loans and start their own delivery company. They struggle however to honor their debt, due to market fluctuations. This forces them to accept smuggling a criminal, originally misrepresented just as a parcel. Abandoning him just beyond the border, the two drivers are pursued by his criminal accomplishes while trying hard to keep their schedule with their customer.

The professional relationship gradually develops into mutual respect and shared background among the two men, with Sandro eventually beginning to date Nino's daughter. Eventually their first trip as independent delivery company is successful, although just barely so. By the end of the movie, three co-protagonists are made very familiar to the audience: the two men, as well as their truck ("il bestione" i.e. "The Beast"), personification of blue-collar work.

== Cast ==
- Giancarlo Giannini as Nino Patrovita
- Michel Constantin as Sandro Colautti
- Giuseppe Maffioli as Super Shell
- Giuliana Calandra as Amalia
- Dalila Di Lazzaro as Magda
- Enzo Fiermonte as Matteo Zaghi
- Jole Fierro as the former wife of Colautti
- Philippe Hersent as Owner of CISA Car Company
- Carlo Gaddi as Camorrista
- Gabriella Giorgelli as Zoe
- Attilio Duse as Truck driver
- Anna Mazzamauro as Friend of Amalia
- Giorgio Trestini as Andrea
- Imma Piro as Lella Colautti
- Franco Angrisano as Mafioso
- Romano Puppo as Dutch Driver
- Franca Scagnetti as Receptionist
- Sergio Testori as Dutchman

== Release ==
The film premiered on 20 November 1974 in Paris and screened in West Germany on 14 February 1975 as Die Cleveren Zwei with an Warner-Columbia Filmverleih distribution.
