= Shadows Unseen =

Shadows Unseen Abuso di potere
- Directed by: Camillo Bazzoni
- Starring: Frederick Stafford
- Cinematography: Claudio Ragona
- Edited by: Roberto Perpignani
- Music by: Riz Ortolani
- Release date: 1972
- Country: Italy
- Language: Italian

Abuso di potere (internationally released as Shadows Unseen) is a 1972 Italian crime film directed by Camillo Bazzoni. The film, despite the original plot, contains several references to actual events, such as the killing of journalist Mauro De Mauro.

== Cast ==
- Frederick Stafford as Commissioner Luca Miceli
- Marilù Tolo as Simona
- Franco Fabrizi as Commissioner Resta
- Reinhard Kolldehoff as Chief of Police (credited as René Kolldehoff)
- Raymond Pellegrin as Nicola Dalò
- Umberto Orsini as Enrico Gagliardi
- Corrado Gaipa as Günther Rosenthal
- Claudio Gora as District Attorney
- Ninetto Davoli as Giorgio the Pusher
- Judy Winter as Rosaria Cruciani
- Elio Zamuto as Sgt. Mortesi
- Guido Leontini as Turi Delogo
- Quinto Parmeggiani as Gagliardi's editor-in-chief
- Gianfranco Barra as Fish Seller
