= The Looters =

1967 film

- Directed by: Jacques Besnard
- Written by: Michel Lebrun (adaptation); Pierre Foucaud (adaptation); Michel Lebrun (dialogue)
- Based on: Albert Conroy (novel) (as Martin Albert)
- Starring: Frederick Stafford; Jean Seberg
- Cinematography: Marcel Grignon
- Edited by: Jacques Pignier
- Music by: Michel Magne
- Production companies: Production Artistique et Cinématographique; CMV Produzione Cinematografica
- Distributed by: Valoria Films
- Release date: 9 August 1967
- Running time: 101 minutes
- Countries: Italy; France
- Language: French

The Looters is a 1967 Italian-French adventure film directed by Jacques Besnard and starring Frederick Stafford and Jean Seberg. The film was shot in France, Italy and northern Colombia.

It was also known as Estouffade à la Caraïbe and Revolt in the Caribbean.

== Plot ==
Morgan, a lapsed burglar, is drugged and shanghaied on board a yacht by beautiful Colleen. When he comes to, the athletic young man learns that Colleen and her friends want him to break open the vaults of a Caribbean island where a ruthless dictator has deposited a treasure stolen from his people.

== Cast ==
- Frederick Stafford as Sam Morgan
- Jean Seberg as Colleen O'Hara
- Maria-Rosa Rodriguez as Estella
- Fernard Bellan as Targo
- Vittorio Sanipoli as Kosta
- Marco Guglielmi as Dietrich
- Mario Pisu as Patrick O'Hara
- Cissé Karamoko as Himself (as Cisse Karamoko)
- José Noguero as Himself
- César Torres as Miguel
- Paul Crauchet as Valés
- Serge Gainsbourg as Clyde

== See also ==
- List of French films of 1967
