= 36 ore all'inferno =

- Original film poster
- Directed by: Roberto Bianchi Montero
- Produced by: Franco Galli
- Starring: Richard Harrison; Pamela Tudor; George Wang
- Release date: 1969
- Country: Italy
- Language: Italian

36 ore all'inferno or 36 Hours to Hell is a 1969 Italian war action film. It stars Richard Harrison and Pamela Tudor.
