= 13 Days to Die =

1965 film

Der Fluch des schwarzen Rubin
- Directed by: Manfred R. Köhler; Alberto Cardone (second unit)
- Written by: Manfred R. Köhler
- Produced by: Wolf C. Hartwig
- Starring: Thomas Alder; Horst Frank; Peter Carsten
- Cinematography: Klaus von Rautenfeld
- Edited by: Herbert Taschner
- Music by: Gert Wilden
- Release date: 17 April 1965
- Countries: Italy; West Germany
- Languages: Italian; German

13 Days to Die (German: Der Fluch des schwarzen Rubin, lit. 'The Curse of the Black Ruby') is a 1965 Italian and West German spy film drama, directed by Manfred R. Köhler and Alberto Cardone.

The film was based on an updated pre-World War II German pulp fiction character named Rolf Torring.

== Cast ==
- Thomas Alder as Rolf Torring
- Horst Frank as Perkins
- Chitra Ratana as Princess Chitra
- Peter Carsten as Hans Warren
- Carlo Tamberlani as Barrington
- Yu Sam as Prinz Gulab
- Serge Nubret as Pongo
- Ma Suphin as Dienerin
- Jacques Bézard as Francis
- Alberto Cevenini
