= Agent 505: Death Trap in Beirut =

1966 film directed by Manfred R. Köhler

- Film poster
- Directed by: Manfred R. Köhler
- Written by: Manfred R. Köhler
- Produced by: Wolf C. Hartwig; Mario Siciliano
- Starring: Frederick Stafford
- Cinematography: Rolf Kästel
- Music by: Ennio Morricone; Bruno Nicolai
- Distributed by: Variety Distribution
- Release date: July 20, 1966
- Running time: 93 minutes

Agent 505: Death Trap in Beirut/Agent 505 - Todesfalle Beirut/From Beirut with Love is a 1966 West German/French/Italian international co-production Eurospy film shot in Lebanon. It was produced and directed by Manfred R. Köhler. The film stars Frederick Stafford in his second film and Renate Ewert in her final feature film.

== Plot ==
Interpol Agent 505 Richard Blake battles a mysterious criminal known as "the Sheik" who plans to eliminate the population of Beirut by dropping radioactive mercury on the city under the guise of cloud seeding.

== Cast ==
- Frederick Stafford ... Richard Blake, Agent 505
- Geneviève Cluny ... Denise Letienne
- Chris Howland ... Bobby O'Toole
- Harald Leipnitz ... Fred Köhler
- Willy Birgel ... Omar Abdullah
- Renate Ewert ... Room Maid
- Gisella Arden ... Monique Köhler
- Pierre Richard ... Inspector Bernard
- Renato Lupi ... Anthony Leandros
- Carla Calò ... Boss
- Danny Taborra ... Police Director
- Patrick Bernhard ... Thug

== Soundtrack ==
The film was scored by Ennio Morricone. The film's score is divided into three different music styles; the film's intro sequence is heavy on brass instruments, while the remainder of the film is scored using both swing music and a combination of a guitar cue and flutes.

== Analysis ==
The film was cited by author Derrick Bang as an example of a genre of spy movies derived from James Bond.
