= La Part des lions =

- Directed by: Jean Larriaga
- Screenplay by: André Tabet; Georges Tabet
- Story by: Jean Larriaga
- Produced by: Sergio Gobbi
- Starring: Robert Hossein; Charles Aznavour; Michel Constantin; Raymond Pellegrin
- Cinematography: Roland Dantigny
- Edited by: Gabriel Rongier
- Music by: Georges Garvarentz
- Production companies: Paris Cannes Production; DC 7
- Release dates: September 9, 1971 (France); December 9, 1973 (Italy)
- Running time: 89 minutes
- Countries: France; Italy

La Part des lions (lit. 'The Lions' Share') is a 1971 crime film written and directed by Jean Larriaga and starring Robert Hossein, Charles Aznavour, Michel Constantin, Raymond Pellegrin and Elsa Martinelli.

It was a French and Italian co-production between Paris Cannes Production and DC 7.

== Plot ==
Maurice Ménard and Éric Chambon are two childhood friends. Ménard is a petty thief who is involved with a ruthless gang of bank robbers, while Chambon is a writer who will follow his long time friend until the loss of both of them.

== Cast ==
- Robert Hossein as Maurice Ménard
- Charles Aznavour as Éric Chambon
- Michel Constantin as Inspector Michel Grazzi
- Raymond Pellegrin as Marcati
- Elsa Martinelli as Annie
- Albert Minski as Jacques
- Michel Peyrelon as David
- René-Jean Chauffard as Bank Director
- Louis Arbessier as Cornille
- Robert Berri as Le patron du bistrot
- Marcel Pérès as Un clochard
- Coline Serreau

== Production ==
La Part des lions was directed by Jean Larriaga. His career was a director was short-lived and prior to his directorial debut with La Part des lions, he co-wrote Claude Mulot's The Blood Rose (1970) and has been an editor and assistant director at Gaumont. Sergio Gobbi said that Larriaga was persistent on developing La Part des lions saying that Larriaga had "followed me everywhere with his script. And to have some peace, I said yes." The film was originally known as L'Amicide, a word formed by combining "ami" (lit. 'friend') and homicide. The film began shooting on May 10, 1971.

La Part des lions was an international co-production between France and Italy through the Paris-based Paris Cannes Production and the Rome-based DC 7.

== Release ==
La Part des Lions was released in France on September 8, 1971. It had 768,707 spectators in France and reached 52nd place in the annual box office.

It was released in Italy on December 9, 1973 as L'ultima rapina a Parigi.
