= Dirty Heroes =

1967 film

- Directed by: Alberto De Martino
- Screenplay by: Dino Verde; Vincenzo Flamini; Alberto De Martino
- Produced by: Edmondo Amati
- Starring: Frederick Stafford
- Cinematography: Giovanni Bergamini
- Edited by: Otello Colangeli
- Music by: Ennio Morricone; Bruno Nicolai
- Production companies: Jacques Roitfeld; Fida Cinematografica; KG Divina-Film GmbH & Co.
- Release dates: 21 December 1967 (Italy); 8 May 1968 (France); 12 July 1968 (West Germany)
- Running time: 106 minutes
- Countries: Italy; West Germany; France

Dirty Heroes (Italian: Dalle Ardenne all'inferno) is a 1967 Italian war film directed by Alberto De Martino and starring Frederick Stafford.

== Cast ==
- Frederick Stafford - Joe Mortimer, Sesame
- Daniela Bianchi - Kristina von Keist
- John Ireland - Captain O'Connor
- Curd Jürgens - General Edwin von Keist
- Michel Constantin - Sgt Rudolph Petrowsky
- Helmuth Schneider - SS-General Hassler
- Howard Ross - Randall
- Fajda Nicol - Magda (as Faida Nichols)
- Anthony Dawson - American Colonel (as Anthony M. Dawson)
- Jacques Monod - Partisan
- Adolfo Celi - Luc Rollman

== Production ==
Ennio De Concinii's credit as script supervisor is unconfirmed and Louis Agotay is credited as coauthor of screenplay only by German sources.

== See also ==
- Eagles Over London
