= Target for Killing =

1966 film

- Film poster
- Directed by: Manfred R. Köhler
- Written by: Anatol Bratt
- Produced by: Karl Spiehs
- Starring: Stewart Granger
- Cinematography: Siegfried Hold; Tonino Delli Colli
- Music by: Marcello Giombini
- Production companies: Intercontinental Produktion; Produzioni Europee Associati (PEA)
- Release date: 30 September 1966
- Running time: 93 minutes
- Countries: Austria; Germany; Italy
- Language: German
- Box office: 300,225 admissions (France); 1,006,226 admissions (Spain)

Target for Killing (German: Das Geheimnis der gelben Mönche, Italian: Tiro a segno per uccidere) is a 1966 Austrian-German-Italian crime film directed by Manfred R. Köhler and starring Stewart Granger. It was shot between Maghreb, Yugoslavia and Rome.

== Cast ==
- Stewart Granger as James Vine
- Karin Dor as Sandra Perkins
- Rupert Davies as Kommissar Saadi
- Curd Jürgens as Gérard van Looch / Giant
- Adolfo Celi as Henry Perkins
- Scilla Gabel as Tigra
- Klaus Kinski as Caporetti
- Molly Peters as Vera
- Erika Remberg as Stewardess
- Luis Induni as Dr. Yang
- José Marco Rosello as Cloyd
- Demeter Bitenc as Killer
- Allen Pinson as Co-Pilot
- Slobodan Dimitrijević as Killer
- Wilbert Gurley as Zonga
