= Michel Constantin =

French actor and volleyball player (1924–2003)

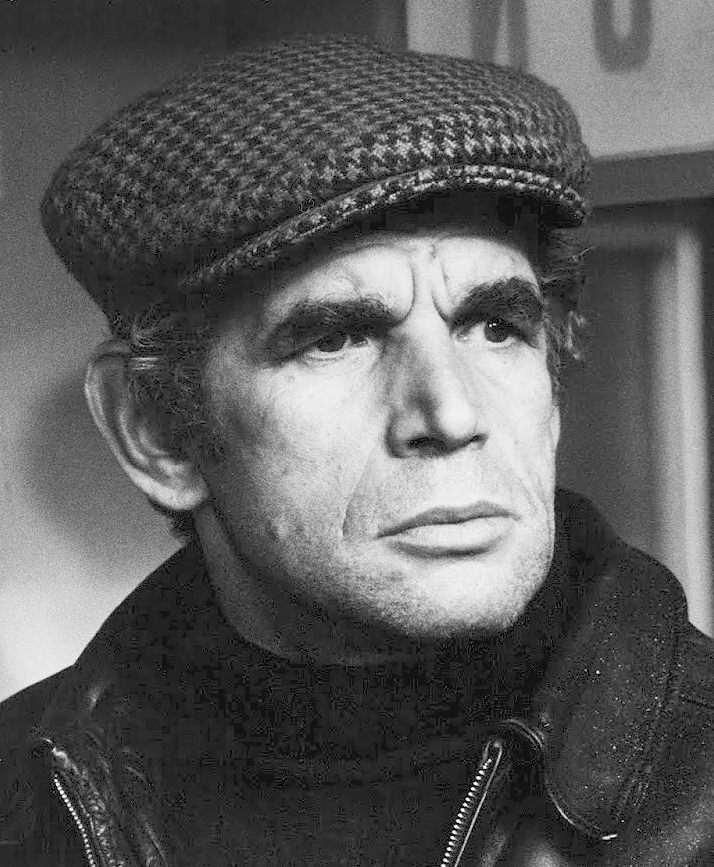
- Constantin in 1974.

Personal information
- Nickname: "le Kalmouk"
- Born: Constantin Hokhloff; 13 July 1924; Paris, France
- Died: 28 August 2003 (aged 79); Draguignan, France
- Height: 6 ft 1 in (1.85 m)

Volleyball information
- Position: Setter

Career
Years	Teams
1944–1947; 1947–1948; 1948–1957	CO Billancourt; Racing Club de France; CO Billancourt

Michel Constantin (born Constantin Hokhloff; 13 July 1924 – 28 August 2003) was a French actor and professional volleyball player. He was the men's national volleyball champion from 1954 to 1956, before making his film debut as a convict in the 1960 prison thriller The Hole. Thanks to his stature and striking features, he became a popular character actor in crime films, often playing thugs and gangsters. He appeared in several films alongside his friend Charles Bronson during the 1970s.

== Early life ==
Born Constantin Hokhloff in Paris, he was the son of a White Russian emigre father and his Polish wife. Hokhloff's father was a former officer in the Russian Army, of Kalmyk descent. He had met Hokhloff's mother while he was stationed in Warsaw, Congress Poland. After the Russian Civil War, the coupled moved to Paris, along with many other White emigres.

During World War II, he worked at the Renault factories in Boulogne-Billancourt, where his family lived, and later managed a knitting needle factory.

== Volleyball career ==
Thanks to his height (1.85 meters) and athletic ability, Constantin was recruited by the volleyball team of Club olympique de Billancourt (CO Billancourt) in 1943. He switched teams to Racing Club de France for the 1947–48 season, but returned to CO Billancourt the following season. As setter, he led the team to French national championships in 1954, 1955 and 1956. It was during this period that he changed his name to Michel Constantin.

During this time, he was also a freelance reporter for the sports journal L'Équipe.

== Acting career ==
Constantin appeared as an extra in the 1956 film Plucking the Daisy, but made his first significant acting debut in the 1960 prison thriller The Hole. Director Jacques Becker and screenwriter José Giovanni sought to recruit a cast of non-professional actors to play the various convicts. Becker's son Jean knew Constantin from his volleyball days, and recommended him for the part. The film was a critical and commercial success, and enabled Constantin's transition into an acting career.

He achieved popularity as a character actor in crime and action films, typically playing thugs and gangsters, and appearing alongside the likes of Lino Ventura and Charles Bronson. In addition to José Giovanni, he also worked with notable directors like Jean-Pierre Melville, Georges Lautner, Nelly Kaplan, Jean Delannoy, Yves Boisset, Jacques Deray, Jean-Pierre Mocky and Henri Verneuil.

Constantin was also a host of the TF1 game show Anagram during the 1980s.

== Personal life ==
Constanin married schoolteacher Maud Serres in 1957. They had a daughter, Sophie (1962–2026), and were longtime residents of Sainte-Maxime. They remained together until her death in 1996.

He was an avid player of contract bridge, and a long-time vice president of the Sainte-Maxime Bridge Club.

=== Death ===
Aged 79, Constanin died of a heart attack on August 28, 2003, two days before his oft-costar and friend Charles Bronson. His remains were cremated and his ashes were scattered on the beach of the Giens Peninsula, where he had met his wife. The French Minister of Culture, Jean-Jacques Aillagon, wrote

"It is with deep sadness that I learned of the passing of Michel Constantin, an iconic actor of quality French cinema. His imposing presence and the rich tones of his voice permeated the films of great French directors such as Jean Becker, Robert Enrico, Jean-Pierre Melville, and Georges Lautner . His striking physique, combined with an undeniable talent for frequently portraying characters with unconventional behavior, allowed him to win the public's lasting affection and leave his mark on a great, popular, and high - quality French cinema.

== Legacy ==
Every year since 2011, the Sainte -Maxime Bridge Club has organized the Michel Constantin Memorial Tournament.

A street in the village of Le Pradet in bears his name.

== Partial filmography ==
- Plucking the Daisy (1956) - Un spectateur du strip-tease (uncredited)
- The Hole (Le Trou) (1960) - Jo Cassine
- A Man Named Rocca (1961) - Le chef des racketteurs américains
- The Law of Men (1962) - Paulo
- Maigret Sees Red (1963) - Cicero
- The Gorillas (1964) - Otto, le légionnaire (uncredited)
- The Wise Guys (Les Grandes Gueules) (1965) - Skida
- Ne nous fâchons pas (1966) - Jeff
- Le deuxième souffle (1966) - Alban
- Dirty Heroes (Dalle Ardenne all'inferno) (1967) - Sgt Rudolph Petrowsky
- La Loi du survivant (1967) - Stan
- Jerk à Istambul (1967) - Vincent
- Mise à sac (1967) - Georges
- The Southern Star (1969) - Jose
- Les Étrangers (1969) - Chamoun
- A Very Curious Girl (La Fiancée du pirate) (1969) - André
- L'ardoise (1970) - Théo Gilani
- Last Known Address (Dernier domicile connu) (1970) - Greg
- Children of Mata Hari (La Peau de Torpedo) (1970) - Coster
- Vertige pour un tueur (1970) - René
- Violent City (1970) - Killain
- The Cop (Un condé) (1970) - Viletti
- Cold Sweat (1970) - Whitey
- Laisse aller... c'est une valse (1971) - Michel
- La Part des lions (1971) - Inspecteur Michel Grazzi
- Il était une fois un flic (1972) - Commissaire Campana
- Les Caïds (1972) - Weiss
- La Scoumoune (1972) - Xavier Saratov
- The Outside Man (Un homme est mort) (1972) - Antoine
- Les Hommes (1973) - Marius Fantoni 'Fanto'
- Le mataf (1973) - Bernard Solville
- Special Killers (1973) - Inspector Palma
- La Valise (1973) - Capt. Augier
- OK patron (1974) - Mario (uncredited)
- Un linceul n'a pas de poches (1974) - Culi
- The Beast (Il bestione) (1974) - Sandro Colautti
- La guerre du pétrole n'aura pas lieu (1975, writer)
- The Track (1975) - Capitaine Nimier
- Au-delà de la peur (1975) - Guilloux
- Sahara Cross (1977)
- The Inglorious Bastards (Quel maledetto treno blindato) (1978) - Veronique
- Ça fait tilt (1978) - Raymond Legris
- Plein les poches pour pas un rond... (1978) - Steff, le taxi
- Signé Furax (1981) - Grougnache
- Cappotto di legno (1981) - Don Vincenzo Talascio
- Tir groupé (1982) - Alexandre Gagnon
- Deux heures moins le quart avant Jésus-Christ (1982) - Le secutor
- Ronde de nuit (1984) - L'instructeur de stand de tir (voice)
- Les Morfalous (1984) - Adjudant Édouard Mahuzard
- Le téléphone sonne toujours deux fois!! (1985) - Le directeur du cinéma
- La baston (1985) - Raoul
- La loi sauvage (1988) - Victor
- Ville à vendre (1992) - Docteur Bernier
