= Eagles Over London =

1969 film by Enzo G. Castellari

- Italian film poster
- Directed by: Enzo G. Castellari
- Screenplay by: Tito Carpi; Vincenzo Flamini; Jose Luis Martinez Molla; Enzo G. Castellari; Gilles Dumoulin
- Story by: Tito Carpi; Vincenzo Flamini; Jose Luis Martinez Molla; Enzo G. Castellari; Gilles Dumoulin
- Produced by: Edmondo Amati
- Starring: Frederick Stafford; Van Johnson; Francisco Rabal; Evelyn Stewart; Luigi Pistilli
- Cinematography: Alejandro Ulloa
- Edited by: Vincenzo Tomassi
- Music by: Francesco De Masi
- Production companies: Fida Cinematografica; Atlantida Films; Productions Jacques Roitfeld
- Release date: 1969
- Running time: 107 minutes
- Countries: Italy; Spain; France

Eagles Over London (Italian: La battaglia d'Inghilterra, lit. 'The Battle of Britain'), is a 1969 Euro War film directed and co-written by Enzo G. Castellari, and starring Frederick Stafford, Van Johnson, Francisco Rabal, Ida Galli, and Luigi Pistilli.

== Plot ==
During the Dunkirk evacuation in 1940, a team of German saboteurs assume the identities of dead British soldiers and are transported to England. Their first objective is to cripple British air defences by destroying radar stations. Though the identities and whereabouts of the saboteurs are unknown, a team of British soldiers is set up to track them down and abort their mission. While the Battle of Britain rages overhead, the final confrontation takes place as the German team are about to blow up the RAF Fighter Command control centre.

== Cast ==
- Frederick Stafford as Cpt. Paul Stevens
- Van Johnson as Air-Marshal George Taylor
- Francisco Rabal as Martin Donovan
- Evelyn Stewart as Flight Officer Meg Jones
- Luigi Pistilli as Maj. Kruger
- Renzo Palmer as Sgt. Donald Mulligan
- Luis Dávila as Jacques
- Christian Hay as Gaston
- Jacques Berthier as Col. Smith
- Teresa Gimpera as Sheila
- George Rigaud and Alfredo Mayo as British Officers
- Eduardo Fajardo as German Officer
- David Areu as Trooper Baker
- Edy Biagetti as Karl
- Ángel del Pozo as British Airman

== Production ==
When Enzo G. Castellari finished the film Kill Them All and Come Back Alone, he asked the producers what their next film would be. They replied a war epic about the Battle of Britain with the Harry Saltzman version yet to be released. Enzo thought that was a great idea but the producers had their sights on Alberto De Martino directing. The producers stipulated that stock footage of the actual Battle of Britain needed to be used in the film and that it should be used in a split-screen method. They asked Enzo if he would direct the special effects sequences and cut it with the stock footage using a split-screen method. Enzo had never heard of "split screen" so he was shown the American films The Thomas Crown Affair and The Boston Strangler. He shot the effects sequences and mixed it using a triple split screen method. An example is having a British plane shoot on the left side, having a German plane being hit on the right side, and having stock footage in the middle. When shown this split-screen footage, the producers were so impressed they decided to have Enzo direct the entire picture. After this, Enzo sat down with a writing partner for a week to rewrite the overlong script to make it more action-oriented and less of a "soap opera".

The film is entirely fictional and historically inaccurate. For instance, the RAF never shot down 94 German planes in a single day; London was never "blitzed" in one sortie by "1,000 planes"; and the RAF Control Centre was never attacked in any way. Actually, the Air Ministry building (Adastral House) was badly damaged by a bomb. 46 people were killed and at least 200 others suffered serious injuries with five members of the Women's Auxiliary Air Force (WAAF) killed on the upper floors of the Air Ministry). The director uses Messerschmitt Bf 109s (or near-replicas of them) as RAF "Hawker Hurricanes", and Supermarine Spitfires as Luftwaffe "Bf 109s". The fictional "bombers" that are supposed to be Heinkel He 111 are in reality CASA 2.111 similar planes built in Spain under licence.

== Releases ==
Simitar Entertainment released the film on VHS in 1994. Echo Bridge Home Entertainment also released the film on VHS in 2001. Severin released the film for the first time ever in America on Region 0 DVD and Blu-ray in 2009. The film was released for Region 2 on 7 June 2010.

Severin release is uncut International version but it is few minutes shorter than original Italian.

== Reception ==
In a contemporary review, The Monthly Film Bulletin stated that the film "shows a glimmer of originality but it is sluggishly developed and peppered with desultory split-screen work" and "the action is efficiently mounted and apart from the appearance of some rather swarthy-looking British Tommies, wartime Britain looks slightly more authentic [...] than the film's many nationalities might have led one to expect."

In a retrospective review, Sight & Sound noted the plotline of Nazi saboteurs active in Britain "has been used in films from Ealing's Went the Day Well? to The Eagle Has Landed, but those movies lacked the formal flamboyance that Castellari brings to his material." The review concluded "It's Boy's Own stuff but it's carried off with such style that it never descends into kitsch."

== Aftermath and influence ==
Roughly thirty per cent of the film Eagles Over London was cut into the macaroni combat film From Hell to Victory. Castellari said that he and his wife went to see From Hell to Victory in theatres and it upset him that footage he shot was reused in another film.

== See also ==
- Euro War
- War film
