= The Battle of El Alamein (film) =

- Film poster
- Directed by: Giorgio Ferroni (as Calvin Jackson Padget)
- Screenplay by: Ernesto Gastaldi; Remigio Del Grosso
- Story by: Ernesto Gastaldi
- Produced by: Luciano Martino; Mino Loy
- Starring: Frederick Stafford; George Hilton; Enrico Maria Salerno
- Cinematography: Sergio D'Offizi
- Edited by: Eugenio Alabiso
- Music by: Carlo Rustichelli
- Production companies: Zenith Cinematografica; Les Films Corona
- Distributed by: Titanus
- Release date: 23 January 1969 (Italy)
- Running time: 96 minutes
- Countries: Italy; France
- Languages: Italian; French

The Battle of El Alamein is a 1969 war film directed in 1969 by Giorgio Ferroni. It was an international co-production between Italy and France. The film depicts the Second Battle of El Alamein.

== Plot ==
Made with the cooperation of the Italian army, the film is told through a company of the 185th Infantry Division "Folgore" commanded by Lieutenant (Lt.) Giorgio Borri. The inexperienced Lt. Borri is assisted by his brother, Sergeant Major (Sgt. Maj.) Claudio Borri, a seasoned veteran of the Bersaglieri. Barri's British counterpart is Lt. Graham, with the two first coming face to face when Barri is captured. The film also features Field Marshal Erwin Rommel, Marshal of Italy Ettore Bastico and Generals (Gen.) Bernard Law Montgomery, Georg Stumme and Wilhelm Ritter von Thoma.

== Cast ==
- Frederick Stafford as Lt. Giorgio Borri
- George Hilton as Lt. Graham
- Michael Rennie as Gen. Bernard Law Montgomery
- Robert Hossein as Field Marshal Erwin Rommel
- Enrico Maria Salerno as Sgt. Maj. Claudio Borri
- Marco Guglielmi as Captain Hubert
- Ettore Manni as Italian Captain
- Gérard Herter as Brigadier General Schwartz
- Ira Fürstenberg as Marta
- Giuseppe Addobbati as Gen. Georg Stumme
- Manlio Busoni as Gen. Ettore Bastico
- Salvatore Borgese as Kapow
- Luciano Catenacci as Sgt. O'Hara
- Nello Pazzafini as Italian Sergeant
- Tom Felleghy as Wilhelm Ritter von Thoma

== Release ==
The Battle of El Alamein was released in Italy on January 23, 1969.
