= Manfred R. Köhler =

German film director and screenwriter (1927–1991)

Manfred R. Köhler (8 March 1927 in Freiberg, Germany - 1991) was a German dubbing director who graduated to being a screenwriter and film director specialising in action films and popular entertainment in the 1960s. He was billed with his middle initial to differentiate himself between the cinematographer and actor Manfred Köhler.

== Career ==
Köhler began his film career with Internationalen Film-Union (IFU) synchronising the dubbing into German of various foreign films. He went to Munich, where he built the Beta Technik dubbing studio then became an independent operator with his own dubbing studio, the Cinesonor.

In the mid-1950s he directed two documentary films for IFU. In the 1960s he began writing and directing films for the international market with Wolf C. Hartwig's Rapid Film company.

He finished his career by writing the screenplay for two television films based on the German musicals Die Zirkusprinzessin and Die Blume von Hawaii.

== Filmography ==
(director and screenwriter unless otherwise indicated)

- Wenn es Sonntag ist (1955) (short subject)
- Land aus Feuer und Schnee (1955) (short subject)
- Coffin from Hong Kong (1964)
- 13 Days to Die (1965)
- Target for Killing (1966)
- Agent 505: Death Trap in Beirut (1966)
- Murderers Club of Brooklyn (dialogue only) (1967)
- The Blood Demon (screenplay only) (1967)
- The Blood of Fu Manchu (story and screenplay only) (1968)
- The Last Mercenary (screenplay only) (1968)
- Rebus (screenplay only) (1969)
- Island of Lost Girls (screenplay only) (1969)
- Die Zirkusprinzessin (1970) (TV Movie)
- Die Blume von Hawaii (1971) (TV movie)
- Daughters of Darkness (screenplay only) (1971)
- Dead Pigeon on Beethoven Street (German dialogue only) (1974)
