= Special Killers =

1973 Italian-French-Spanish film

- Poster "Meurtres à Rome" (La ragazza di via Condotti)
- Directed by: Germán Lorente
- Written by: Germán Lorente; Adriano Asti; Miguel de Echarri
- Produced by: Roberto Sabbatini
- Starring: Frederick Stafford; Femi Benussi
- Cinematography: Mario Capriotti
- Music by: Enrico Simonetti
- Production companies: Zafes Film; Midega Film; Mandala Film
- Release dates: 11 August 1973 (Italy); 7 December 1977 (France)
- Running time: 97 minutes
- Countries: Spain; France; Italy
- Language: Italian

Special Killers (Italian title: La ragazza di via Condotti, French title: Meurtres à Rome or Le crime de la via Condotti, Spanish title: La chica de via Condotti) is a 1973 Italian-French-Spanish crime-thriller film directed by Germán Lorente. The film stars are Frederick Stafford, Femi Benussi, Claude Jade and Michel Constantin.

== Plot ==
An attractive brunette, Simone Mattei (Patty Shepard) is drunk and argues with her husband Sandro (Frederick Stafford). This visits his best friend Tiffany (Claude Jade) and complains her his suffering in the marriage crisis. While Sandro stays at Tiffany, Simone makes love with a lover. The tough guy penetrates her and starts at the same time to strangle her. He keeps on strangling the beauty until she is dead. An hour later, Sandro, who is a private investigator, finds his dead wife Simone. He comments the murder with "poor little bitch", but beside the victim he also discovers a photo showing a man on a motorcycle and a woman with glasses in the background. Now he wants to find the murderer. His girlfriend Tiffany, who works as a photographer, makes a "Blow-up" from the photograph. Tiffany recognizes as the woman with glasses a certain Laura Damiani (Femi Benussi). Sandro and Tiffany are looking for her and they found her as stripper in a night club in Rome. While Tiffany has an unrequited crush on him, Sandro start to fall in love with Laura, mistress of an unscrupulous lawyer (Alberto de Mendoza). And Laura is mixed up in blackmail, crimes and shady business.

== Cast ==
- Frederick Stafford as Sandro
- Femi Benussi as Laura
- Claude Jade as Tiffany
- Michel Constantin as Palma
- Alberto de Mendoza as Russo
- Simón Andreu as Mario
- Manuel de Blas as Franco Bertoni
- Patty Shepard as Simone
- Dada Gallotti as Gina Necioni
- Pupo de Luca as Taxi Driver
- Giuseppe Castellano as Broccole
- Arturo Dominici as District Attorney
- Giacomo Furia as Bartender
