= The Inglorious Bastards =

1978 film by Enzo G. Castellari

- Italian theatrical release poster
- Italian: Quel maledetto treno blindato
- Directed by: Enzo G. Castellari
- Screenplay by: Sandro Continenza; Sergio Grieco; Romano Migliorini; Laura Toscano; Franco Marotta; Alberto Piferi
- Produced by: Roberto Sbarigia
- Starring: Bo Svenson; Peter Hooten; Fred Williamson; Michael Pergolani; Jackie Basehart; Michel Constantin; Debra Berger; Raimund Harmstorf; Ian Bannen
- Cinematography: Giovanni Bergamini
- Edited by: Gianfranco Amicucci
- Music by: Francesco De Masi
- Production company: Film Concorde
- Distributed by: Capitol International
- Release date: November 2, 1978 (Italy)
- Running time: 99 minutes
- Country: Italy
- Language: English

The Inglorious Bastards (Italian: Quel maledetto treno blindato, lit. 'That damned armored train') is a 1978 Italian Euro War film directed by Enzo G. Castellari and starring Bo Svenson, Peter Hooten, Fred Williamson, Jackie Basehart, and Ian Bannen. The film concerns a group of prisoners who are drafted into a special war mission in 1944 while attempting to flee to Switzerland.

The film attracted critics' attention again after Quentin Tarantino used the title for his 2009 film Inglourious Basterds. The Tarantino film is not a remake of The Inglorious Bastards, but contains a few references to it, including the appearances of Svenson as an American colonel and Castellari as a Wehrmacht general (although credited as "himself").

== Plot ==
In France in 1944, American soldiers Berle, a deserter; Nick Colasanti, a petty thief; Fred, nicknamed "Assassin"; Tony, a mutineer; and Lieutenant Yeager (arrested for refusing to comply with orders to kill, among others, women and children) are sentenced to death for their crimes and are shipped to a prisoners' camp near the Ardennes.

During the journey to the camp, the five criminals take advantage of a flat tire and a Luftwaffe air raid to escape. Yeager takes command and plans to defect to neutral Switzerland.

The group stops at an abandoned French factory to rest and replenish their supplies. They capture a German soldier hiding in the building who tells the group he is also a convicted criminal sentenced to death and on the run. Despite the desire of Tony and Fred to kill him, Yeager takes him along in case the Nazis attack again.

The group meets a German patrol, and the captured soldier immediately proves helpful, convincing the patrol the Americans are his prisoners. They kill some of the German soldiers and escape. When the group encounters German nurses bathing in a river, Nick suggests they pretend to be German soldiers. The nurses realize the men are Americans when they see Fred and start shooting at them. Tony, Nick, Berle and Fred escape to a nearby camp.

When German soldiers arrive at the camp, Yeager sends the captured German to talk to them. The captured German discovers the group are actually Americans disguised as Germans and is killed trying to alert Yeager's group. Yeager's group return fire and kill the disguised Americans, who had been ordered to carry out an important espionage mission. With no other option, Colonel Buckner assigns Yeager's group the task instead.

When Fred and Buckner are captured, Yeager, Tony, a French resistance fighter named Berle and Nick attack a Nazi fortification and free them. Colonel Buckner then explains the mission to destroy an armored train shipping a prototype of the V-2 missile.

During their attack, Nick is unable to contact the others and is killed. Berle is killed by the train driver, and when all hope of succeeding seems lost, Lieutenant Yeager blows up the train with himself on board, destroying the missiles and the station assaulted by the Nazis.

Fred, wounded, escapes into the countryside. Colonel Buckner also survives along with Tony, who returns to Nicole.

== Cast ==
- Bo Svenson as Lieutenant Robert Yeager
- Fred Williamson as Private Fred Canfield
- Peter Hooten as Tony
- Michael Pergolani as Nick Colasanti
- Jackie Basehart as Corporal Berle
- Raimund Harmstorf as Adolf Sachs
- Ian Bannen as Colonel Charles Thomas Buckner
- Michel Constantin as Veronique
- Debra Berger as Nicole
- John Loffredo as Sergeant
- Mike Morris as Wehrmacht Colonel Hauser
- Donald O'Brien as Waffen-SS Commander
- Manfred Freyberger as Waffen-SS Colonel Schrader
- Bill Vanders as Wehrmacht General

== Production ==
The original working title was Bastardi senza gloria (literally: "Inglorious Bastards"). The first attempt to make this movie took place in 1976 in the United States and involved an approach proposed by Bo Richards to filmmaker Ted V. Mikels. Mikels rejected it on the grounds that a movie pitched as a Dirty Dozen follow-up was a decade late, and any insistence on preserving a title containing the word "bastard" would spell box office failure at the time.

Filming took place in locations throughout Lazio, including Barbarano Romano and Castello Orsini-Odescalchi, and at Cinecittà Studios in Rome. Halfway through principal photography, the production's entire armory of prop firearms were seized by authorities, on the grounds that they could end up in the hands of terrorists, due to the recent kidnapping and murder of Prime Minister Aldo Moro by the Red Brigades. Castellari was forced to construct new blank-fire prop guns from scratch to complete the film on time.

== Releases ==
The film was released in the United States as The Inglorious Bastards; it was also issued as Hell's Heroes and as Deadly Mission on home video. The American success of the blaxploitation genre led distributors to reedit this film and distribute it as G.I. Bro; in this version, scenes were cut to make Fred Williamson the lead character. The tagline on this version was "If you're a kraut, he'll take you out!"

The reissue title for this film was Counterfeit Commandos. Severin Films released a three-disc set that features a newly remastered transfer of the film, an interview with Quentin Tarantino (the director of the similarly titled film Inglourious Basterds) and director Enzo G. Castellari, trailers, a tour of shooting locations, a documentary on the making of the film with interviews with Bo Svenson, Fred Williamson, and Enzo G. Castellari, and a CD with the soundtrack. Both spellings appear on the DVDs: one uses the word "Bastards" while the other uses "Basterds."

== Reception ==
The film holds a 100% rating on review aggregation website Rotten Tomatoes based on five reviews.

In a contemporary review, the Monthly Film Bulletin stated that the film is "totally lacking in realism or historical perspective" as well as that it "does boast some tolerably rousing action passages, notably the climactic sequence on the train."

== See also ==
- Filthy Thirteen
- Macaroni Combat
- Spaghetti Western
- War film
