= United States v. Shynkarenko =

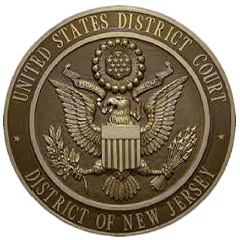
- Court: United States District Court for the District of New Jersey
- Full case name: United States v. Maksym Shynkarenko
- Docket nos.: 2:08-cr-00625

Court membership
- Judge sitting: William H. Walls

Maksym Shynkarenko, a citizen of Kharkiv, Ukraine, was indicted on September 16, 2008 by the grand jury for the United States District Court for the District of New Jersey on one count of conspiracy to transport and ship child pornography; sixteen counts of transportation and shipment of child pornography; one count of conspiracy to advertise child pornography; 12 counts of advertising child pornography; one count of engaging in a child exploitation enterprise; and one count of money laundering under the relevant 18 U.S.C. Sections: 2251, 2252A, 1956, and 2.

The charges were based on Shynkarenko's alleged involvement in a conspiracy that included the founding and operating of for-profit hardcore child pornography websites. Shynkarenko was arrested in January 2009 while on vacation in Thailand, and detained for extradition to the United States. Following a three-year battle to avoid extradition, he appeared in U.S. federal court in Newark, NJ on June 11, 2012.

== Background ==
The indictment of Maksym Shynkarenko is based on his alleged role in a conspiracy involving the founding and operating of several websites that offered still images and videos of child pornography to subscribers. According to the indictment, Shynkarenko and his three co-conspirators operated a two-tiered system of websites, with the first tier consisting of websites displaying samples of child pornography. These websites, named "Hualama" and "Ciampics" were used to prompt potential customers to enter their personal and credit card information in exchange for access to the second tier websites. The second tier websites, which included, but were not limited to, "Illegal.CP", "Hottest Childporn Garden" and "Pedo Heaven", consisted of subscription-based websites that, for a monthly fee of $79.99, offered users access to thousands of images and videos depicting the sexual abuse and exploitation of minors that was often graphic, and often perpetrated by adults.

Under this two-tiered system, once the credit card information was received by Shynkarenko and his three co-conspirators, they would run a series of internal checks on the credit card to ensure that the customer would not pose a risk to the enterprise. Once the credit card was approved and payment was received, an e-mail was sent to the purchaser containing a username and password that allowed them to access the child pornography materials for a specified period of time. According to the indictment, the proceeds of user subscriptions were then laundered, with Shynkarenko and his three co-conspirators obtaining the processing services of legitimate credit card companies such as "Cardservice International" and "Forcetronix" by using fake merchant names to conceal the criminal nature of the enterprise. The funds received through this process were then deposited in a number of bank accounts located in New Jersey, Estonia, Latvia, and Ukraine, among others, to be subsequently wired from those enterprise accounts to the personal bank accounts of Shynkarenko and his three co-conspirators.

== Investigation ==
The investigation of Maksym Shynkarenko began with the discovery of the website "Illegal.CP" by U.S. Immigration and Customs Enforcement's Homeland Security Investigation (ICE HSI) agents in 2005 during an ongoing investigation of a known pedophile in Long Branch, New Jersey. During a search of this individual's computer, agents recovered e-mails that contained advertisements for the website "Illegal.CP" that clearly depicted it as a for-profit child pornography enterprise. An undercover ICE HSI agent subsequently purchased a 20-day subscription to "Illegal.CP" to investigate, and determined that the website contained thousands of images of what appeared to be child pornography, and also made offers to purchase videos provided by users. ICE HSI agents in New Jersey began a three-stage investigation of the website in 2005 consisting of Operations "Emissary", "Emissary Two", and "Thin ICE".

The first stage of the investigation, Operation Emissary, uncovered the identities of hundreds of individuals who had subscribed to "Illegal.CP" between November 2005 and February 2006. The second stage, "Emissary Two", took place in late 2006 as agents recovered a database containing the identities of hundreds of additional subscribers who had their credit cards processed by the website. Finally, Operation Thin ICE focused on the operators of the website – allegedly Shynkarenko and his 3 co-conspirators – and recovered evidence on additional individual subscribers. These leads were provided along with master search warrants drafted by the New Jersey U.S. Attorney's Office to the ICE HSI and U.S. Attorney's Offices throughout the United States for the arrests of those identified as having subscriptions to the website. Ultimately, the investigation of "Illegal.CP" has resulted in the convictions of 560 individuals in 47 states.

== Illegal.CP ==
The information on the website "Illegal.CP" that was uncovered during the investigation by the ICE HSI provides insight into the alleged methods of Shynkarenko and his co-conspirators. According to the ICE HSI, Shynkarenko would advertise to potential customers through e-mails and "pop ups" that contained banners identifying the site "Illegal.CP", and more than a dozen images of minors engaging in sexual acts with other minors and adults. The ads contained text used to attract new customers, stating "[n]ow you are [sic] few minutes away from the best children porn site on the net!" and "[i]f you join this site you will get tons of uncensored forbidden pics... forbidden stories, and, of course, many videos.", as well as displaying positive comments from a purported current customer of the website, with the words "join now" included on the top and bottom of the page. Once an individual subscribed, they would receive an e-mail providing a username and password for the website, and information on the website's operating procedure. The e-mail would inform new subscribers that credit charges would appear on the subscriber's credit card statement as the name "ADSOFT" to avoid detection, and would include a charge of $79.99. Once the "Illegal.CP" website was accessed, the initial page contained the following statement: "Our site is illegal in all countries... Even if you have problems with police you can always say that someone had stolen the information from your credit card and used it. It is very difficult to establish that you were the person to pay for it". The subscriber would then have access to thousands of still images and videos of child pornography, and be able to supply their own personal videos to the website for money.

== Conclusion ==
In June 2012, Shynkarenko was extradited to the US to face charges of distribution of child pornography; he accepted a guilty plea to a single count in January 2014 and was sentenced to 30 years in June 2014. The Associated Press referred to Shynkarenko as "most significant distributor of child pornography ever prosecuted in the U.S."
