= Judge Rosen =

Judge Rosen may refer to:

- James Rosen (jurist) (1909–1972), judge of the United States Court of Appeals for the Third Circuit
- Gerald Ellis Rosen (born 1951), judge of the United States District Court for the Eastern District of Michigan
- Max Rosenn (1910–2006), judge of the United States Court of Appeals for the Third Circuit
