= Erich Emminger =

German politician (1880–1951)

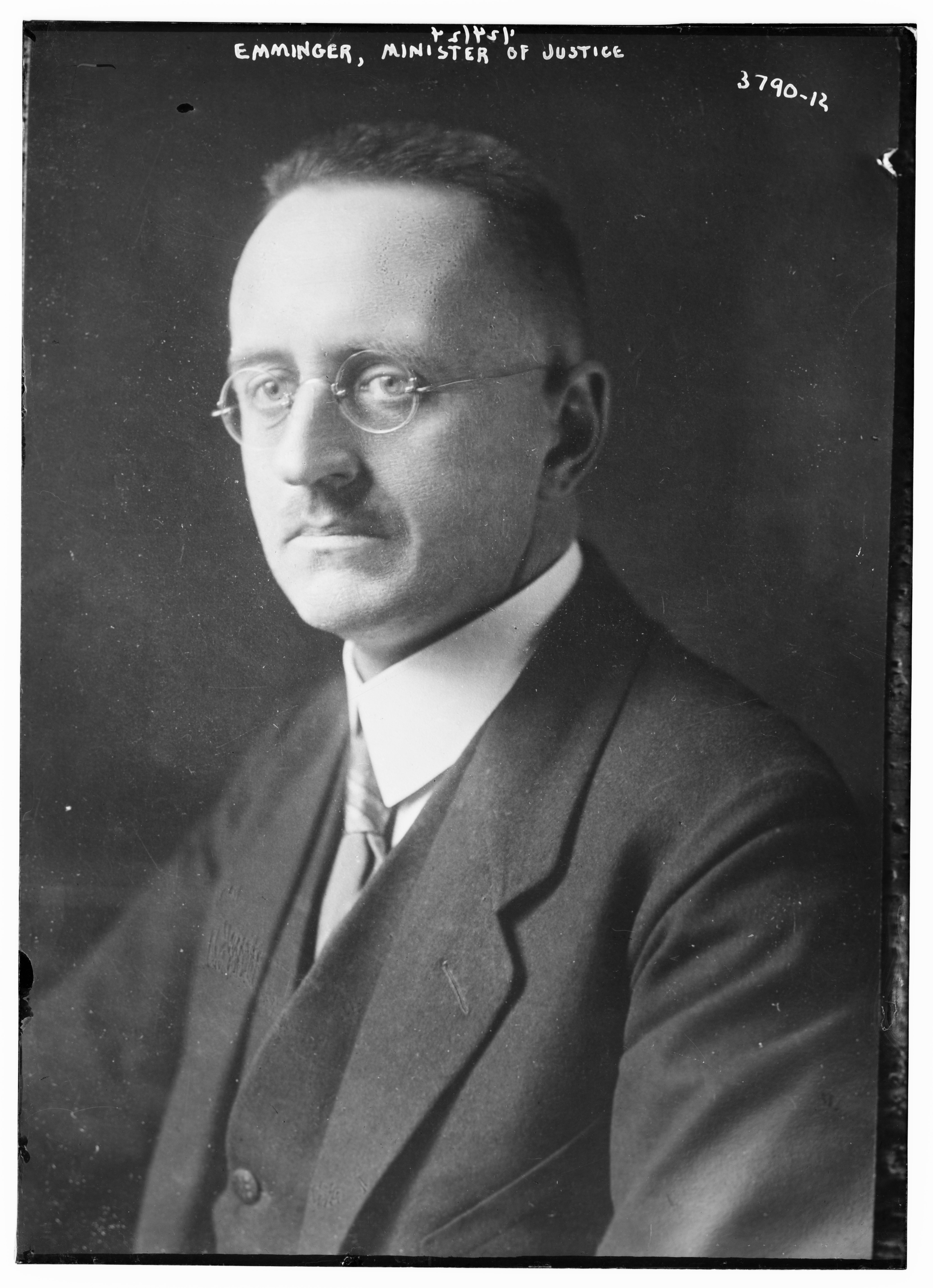
- Emminger in 1924

Minister of Justice
- In office 30 November 1923 – 15 April 1924
- Chancellor: Wilhelm Marx
- Preceded by: Gustav Radbruch
- Succeeded by: Curt Joël (acting)

Member of the Reichstag
- In office 24 June 1920 – 14 July 1933
- Constituency: Upper Bavaria–Swabia

Personal details
- Born: 25 June 1880 Eichstätt, Kingdom of Bavaria, German Empire
- Died: 30 August 1951 (aged 71) Munich, Bavaria, West Germany
- Party: Centre (Before 1918); BVP (From 1918)
- Education: Münster University
- Profession: Lawyer

Erich Emminger (25 June 1880 – 30 August 1951) was a German lawyer and Catholic politician of the Center Party (Zentrum) and later of the Bavarian People's Party (BVP).

He served as Minister of Justice in the Weimar Republic from 30 November 1923 until 15 April 1924 under Chancellor Wilhelm Marx.

== Early life ==
Erich Emminger was born on 25 June 1880 in Eichstätt, Bavaria. His parents were Johann Adolf Erich Emminger (1856–1909), a Gymnasialprofessor, and his wife Marie Therese (1854–99), née Müller, daughter of an Augsburg notary. Emminger married Maria Schärft in 1906. Their children included Otmar Emminger, who became president of the Deutsche Bundesbank.

Following his training as a lawyer at Münster, Emminger practiced law at Augsburg (1906–08) and Nuremberg (1908–09). In 1909 he became a civil servant (state prosecutor and district judge). He participated in World War I first as a voluntary soldier and later as a Kriegsgerichtsrat (judge-advocate).

== Political career ==
Emminger was a member of the Catholic Center Party (Zentrum) and, from 1913 to 1918 held a seat in the Imperial Reichstag for the constituency of Weilheim. In 1918, he joined the Bavarian People's Party (BVP) and represented it in the Weimar Reichstag 1920-33.

Emminger was Minister of Justice in the first cabinet of Chancellor Wilhelm Marx, which took office on 30 November 1923. His tenure was defined by the passage of the three decrees of 22 December 1923, 4 January and 13 February 1924, which were based on the Marx Enabling Act (Marxsches Ermächtigungsgesetz) of 8 December 1923. These significantly changed civil and criminal law and the judiciary system with an eye towards speeding up proceedings. The reform of 4 January became known as the so-called Emminger Reform that among other things abolished the jury as trier of fact and replaced it with the mixed system of judges and lay judges in Germany's judiciary which still exists today. Jury courts (Schwurgerichte), formerly based on jurors, kept their name but were in fact replaced by lay judges. Since the reforms were successful, they were kept in place by later legislation once the enabling act had lapsed.

Late 1923 was among the most tumultuous times of the Weimar Republic, bringing the peak of hyperinflation and the ongoing Occupation of the Ruhr. One of Emminger's main goals as a politician and lawyer became a revaluation of the currency to partially offset the adverse social consequences of hyperinflation. As a minister he prevented the planned revaluation ban (Aufwertungsverbot) from becoming law and continued to fight for revaluation as a Reichstag delegate.

Emminger left office on 15 April 1924 and his State Secretary, Curt Joël, took over as acting Minister of Justice. He remained a member of the judiciary committee (Rechtsausschuss) of the Reichstag and in 1927-31 served as chairman of the Central Board of the German-Austrian Working Group (Zentralvorstand der deutsch-österreichischen Arbeitsgemeinschaft), which worked towards a harmonisation of German and Austrian laws. He also contributed to a reform of the criminal law.

Emminger was re-elected to the Reichstag in 1933 but the Nazi takeover ended his political activities. He worked as a judge at the State Supreme Court (Oberste Landesgericht) of Bavaria in 1931-35 and then at the Provincial High Court (Oberlandesgericht). From 1946 until his retirement in July 1949, he was Senatspräsident there.

Emminger died in Munich on 30 August 1951.

== Publications ==
- Die Aufwertungsfrage im aufgelösten Reichstage (The Revaluation Question in the Dissolved Reichstag), 1924
