= Michael Chagares =

American judge (born 1962)

Mike Chagares
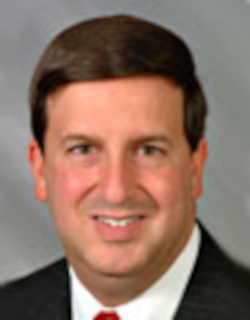

Chief Judge of the United States Court of Appeals for the Third Circuit
- Incumbent
- Assumed office December 4, 2021
- Preceded by: D. Brooks Smith

Judge of the United States Court of Appeals for the Third Circuit
- Incumbent
- Assumed office April 20, 2006
- Appointed by: George W. Bush
- Preceded by: Michael Chertoff

Personal details
- Born: Michael Arthur Chagares; May 1, 1962 (age 64) Pittsburgh, Pennsylvania, U.S.
- Party: Libertarian (former); Republican
- Spouse: Margaret Chagares
- Education: Gettysburg College (BA); Seton Hall University (JD)

Michael Arthur Chagares (born May 1, 1962) is an American lawyer who has served as the chief judge of the United States Court of Appeals for the Third Circuit since 2020. He was appointed to the court by President George W. Bush in 2006.

== Education ==
Chagares received his Bachelor of Arts degree from Gettysburg College in 1984 and his Juris Doctor from Seton Hall University School of Law in 1987.

== Legal career ==
Chagares began his legal career as a law clerk for Judge Morton Ira Greenberg of the United States Court of Appeals for the Third Circuit from 1987 to 1988. Chagares was in private practice the next two years before joining the United States Department of Justice as an assistant United States attorney in 1990. He rose to become chief of the Civil Division for the U.S. Attorney's Office for the District of New Jersey in 1999, but left the Justice Department in 2004 to return to private practice at Cole Schotz in Hackensack, New Jersey.

Since 1991, Chagares has been an adjunct professor at Seton Hall University School of Law.

== Federal judicial service ==
Chagares was nominated to the Third Circuit by President George W. Bush on January 25, 2006, to fill the seat vacated by Michael Chertoff, who resigned to become Secretary of Homeland Security. Chagares's nomination generated no controversy and moved unusually swiftly through the United States Senate, and he was confirmed just over two months later on April 4, 2006, by a 98–0 vote. He received his commission on April 20, 2006. On November 17, 2021, it was announced that Chagares will become the next Chief Judge of the Third Circuit, effective on December 4, 2021.

== Writings ==
Chagares co-authored the non-fiction book New Jersey Federal Civil Procedure.

Legal offices
| Preceded by Michael Chertoff | Judge of the United States Court of Appeals for the Third Circuit; 2006–present | Incumbent |
| Preceded by D. Brooks Smith | Chief Judge of the United States Court of Appeals for the Third Circuit; 2021–present | Incumbent |
