= Lay judge =

Person assisting a judge in a trial

A lay judge, sometimes called a lay assessor, is a person assisting a judge in a trial. Lay judges are used in some civil law jurisdictions. Lay judges are appointed volunteers and often require some legal instruction. However, they are not permanent officers. They attend proceedings about once a month, and often receive only nominal or "costs covered" pay. Lay judges are usually used when the country does not have juries. Lay judges may be randomly selected for a single trial (as jurors are), or politically appointed. In the latter case they may usually not be rejected by the prosecution, the defense, or the permanent judges. Lay judges are similar to magistrates of England and Wales, but magistrates sit about twice as often.

== In different countries ==
=== Austria ===
In criminal proceedings, lay judges sit alongside professional judges on cases carrying a maximum punishment of more than five years, as well as for political crimes. Lay judges are also used in labor, social, and commercial law disputes.

=== Brazil ===
In Brazil, Law Nº 9.099/1995 created the "Juizados Especiais" (Special Petty Courts), with restricted jurisdiction to settle small claims (understood as those with a "lawsuit worth" lower than 40 times the country's minimum wage) and/or criminal misdemeanors (listed in the Executive Order Nº 3.688/1941). In this procedure, lay judges act under supervision of judges to preside over the court as well as to act as conciliators. Their decisions, called "pareceres", are submitted to the judge for homologation before it has any effects on the parties. According to the law, lay judges must be selected among lawyers with more than 5 years of experience.

=== Finland ===
In Finland, two (previously and sometimes also today three) lay judges (lautamies, nominative pl. lautamiehet) are called in for serious or complicated cases in district courts, to accompany a professional, legally trained judge. The professional judge is the chair of the panel, but otherwise the judges have equal rights. The aim is to introduce their "common sense of justice" into the process. Simpler cases are handled by one or three professional judges, and all Appeals Court, Supreme Court and administrative court judges are necessarily professional.

Lay judges are appointed by local municipal councils, in practice by negotiations between political parties, from among volunteers. Each municipality elects a number of lay judges depending on its size, with two as the minimum. The minimum qualifications are Finnish citizenship, full citizenship rights (a lay judge may not be a dependent or in bankruptcy), 25–64 years of age when elected, and general suitability for the position. Lay judges must resign at the age of 68 at the latest. Officials of the judicial, law enforcement or corrections authorities, such as prosecutors, attorneys, policemen, distrainers or customs officers, may not be elected as lay judges.

New legislation (2009) has limited the role of lay judges. They are employed only in serious criminal cases, which comprised 6% of cases in 2013, while 29% of cases were handled in writing and 65% with a single professional judge. Almost all (>94%) cases concerning homicide, child molestation and sabotage are handled by lay judges. Formerly they always sat in, for instance, family law proceedings. On average, lay judges sit in session for 12 days a year, or 20 days at maximum.

=== Germany ===
Except for most crimes for which the trier of fact is a single professional judge, and serious political crimes which are tried before a panel of professional judges, in the judiciary of Germany all charges are tried before mixed tribunals on which lay judges (Schöffen; a kind of lay judge) sit side by side with professional judges. Section 263 of the German Code of Criminal Procedure requires a two-thirds majority for most decisions unfavorable to the defendant; denial of probation by simple majority is an important exception. In most cases lay judges do not directly examine documents before the court or have access to the case file.

The only statutory criterion is that lay judges must be citizens who have not been convicted of, or been under investigation for, a serious crime. However, people "ought not" to be chosen if they are under 25 years old or over 70 years old, very high government officials, judges, prosecutors, lawyers, policemen, ministers, or priests, or do not live in the community at the time of selection, or have been a lay judge in the past two terms. In addition, people may refuse to serve if they are over 65 years old, members of the federal or state legislatures, doctors, nurses, druggists if working alone, or housewives if overburdened, or have served as a lay judge in the preceding term. Applications can be made to become a lay judge by interested citizens, but this does not occur often, and welfare institutions, sports clubs, financial and health insurance institutions, trade unions, industrial companies and other public authorities are primarily called upon to nominate candidates. It appears that motivation includes social responsibility, image cultivation, advertising, and participation in fine allocation.

Lay judges are selected by a selection committee from lists that are approved by municipal councils (Gemeinderat) with a two-thirds majority of attending local councilors. The selection committee consists of a judge from the Amtsgericht, a representative of the state government, and ten "trusted citizens" (Vertrauenspersonen) who are also elected by two-thirds of the municipal council, and selects from the list of candidates the number needed to staff the various tribunals. The practice was similar in East Germany.

Lay judges have historically been predominantly middle-aged men from middle-class backgrounds, largely due to a selection procedure in which personal acquaintance, political affiliation and occupation all play an important role. A study conducted in 1969 found that, of the lay judges in its sample, approximately 25% were civil service employees, compared to only about 12% being blue-collar workers. A study published in 2009 put this number at 27% civil service employees versus 8% of the general population, and noted the relatively high numbers of housewives, the relatively low number of private sector employees, and relative old age of lay judges.

=== Greece ===
Under the Constitution of Greece and the Code of Criminal Procedure, all felonies except for a select few felonies of special nature (such as terrorism) must be tried by a "Mixed Jury Court" composed of three professional judges including the President of the Court and four lay judges.

=== Hungary ===
The Fundamental Law of Hungary states that "non-professional judges shall also participate in the administration of justice in the cases and ways specified in an Act." In these cases, the court adjudicates in a panel which is composed of 1 professional judge and 2 lay judges or 2 professional judges and 3 lay judges. Lay judges are elected by city councils and can be Hungarian citizens between the age of 30 and 70 years who have not been convicted.

=== Israel ===
While all criminal cases in Israel are tried by professional judges without any lay participation, cases in the Labor Courts of Israel, which hear labor disputes and cases involving Israel's social security system, are heard by professional judges sitting alongside lay judges. Cases in the Regional Labor Courts are heard by a single professional judge alongside two lay judges, one of whom has experience in the labor sector and another with experience in management, while appeals to the National Labor Court, which hears appeals from the Regional Labor Courts, are heard by three professional judges alongside a lay judge from the labor side and a lay judge from the management side. Lay judges in Israeli labor courts are appointed by the Minister of Justice and the Minister of Labor, and serve for a three-year period. They have equal voting power to the professional judges.

The military court system of the Israel Defense Forces also employs officers as lay judges. Hearings in district military courts are generally presided over by a professional military judge and two officers who serve in units based in the court's regional district who generally do not have a legal background. Hearings in the Military Court of Appeals, the supreme military court of Israel, are generally presided over by two professional judges and one officer acting as a lay judge.

=== Japan ===
A system for trial by jury was first introduced in 1923 under Prime Minister Katō Tomosaburō's administration. Although the system generated relatively high acquittal rates, it was rarely used, in part because it required defendants to give up their rights to appeal the factual determinations made. The system lapsed by the end of World War II. In 2009, as a part of a larger judicial reform project, laws came into force to introduce citizen participation in certain criminal trials by introducing lay judges. Lay judges comprise the majority of the judicial panel. They do not form a jury separate from the judges, as in a common law system, but participate in the trial as inquisitorial judges in accordance with the civil law legal tradition. They actively analyze and investigate evidence presented by the defense and prosecution.

=== Norway ===
In the district courts of Norway, lay judges sit alongside professional judges in mixed courts in most cases. In most cases, two lay judges sit alongside one professional judge. The court leader (Sorenskriver) may decree that a case have three lay judges sitting alongside two professional judges if its workload is particularly large or if there are other significant reasons. Decisions are made by simple majority.

Lay judges also serve in criminal cases in the appellate courts. From 1. January 2018, the Court of Appeal is convened with two professional- and five lay judges. Before 1. January 2018, if the crime carried a maximum sentence of six years imprisonment or more, the lay judges were replaced with a jury. The jury was chosen from the same list as the lay judges, meaning that lay judges in the appellate courts also served as jurors. If the jury found the defendant guilty, the jury spokesperson, and three other jurors selected at random, served as lay judges during the sentencing. In the few cases where a professional judges overturn the jury's verdict, regardless of whether the original verdict was one of guilt or innocence, the case was retried with three professional judges and four lay judges.

In the Supreme Court, there are no lay judges.

Lay judges are not totally representative of the population. Only 2.8% are under 30 years of age and 60% are 50 or more.

=== Serbia ===
In Serbian courts, certain criminal and civil cases are heard by panels composed of professional and lay judges, while others are heard solely by professional judges. In non-litigious civil proceedings regarding housing rights, cases are heard by one professional judge and two lay judges. In criminal proceedings, cases which are punishable by more than eight and up to twenty years' imprisonment are heard by a single professional judge and two lay judges, while cases involving offenses punishable by between thirty and forty years' imprisonment are heard by panels composed of two professional judges and three lay judges.

=== Sweden ===
In first- and second-tier Swedish courts, both in the general and the administrative hierarchy, politically appointed lay judges (nämndemän) sit alongside professional judges in district and appellate general and administrative courts, but decide virtually no civil cases. Lay judges are always in the majority in district courts, whereas the professional judges are in the majority in the appellate courts.

Municipal assemblies appoint lay judges for the district courts and the county councils appoint lay judges for the appellate and county administrative courts. They are appointed for a period of 4 years, and may not refuse appointment without valid excuse such as an age of 60 years. Typically, a lay judge will serve one day per month in court during his or her tenure.

In principle, any adult can become a lay judge. Lay judges must be Swedish citizens and over 18 years old. People that cannot be lay judges are judges, court officers, prosecutors, police, attorneys, and professionals engaged in judicial proceedings. In practice, lay judges in Sweden are elderly, wealthy, and better-educated. Lay judges are usually politicians with the local authority from which they are appointed, appointed in proportion to political party representation at the last local elections.

The use of lay judges in Sweden goes back to the Middle Ages.

=== Denmark ===
Approximately 15,000 lay judges currently serve in all Danish courts except the Supreme Court. Lay judges are selected from the population for a period of four years, and have essentially equal influence to the professional judges in determining guilt and sentencing. In regional courts, two lay judges sit alongside one professional judge, and decisions are made by simple majority.

Civil participation in the judicial system, including criminal justice, is mandated by section 65 of the Constitution of Denmark.

=== Taiwan ===
President Tsai Ing-wen discussed the implementation of lay judges within the Taiwanese legal system in 2016, and later convened the National Conference on Judicial Reform, which met through 2017. In July 2020, the Legislative Yuan passed the National Judges Act to regulate lay judges. The system is scheduled to be implemented in January 2023.

== Historical examples ==
=== Germany ===
There have been lay judges in Germany since early times. A Swabian ordinance of 1562 called for the summons of jurymen (urtheiler), and various methods were in use in Emmendingen, Oppenau, and Oberkirch. Hauenstein's charter of 1442 secured the right to be tried in all cases by 24 fellow equals, and in Friburg the jury was composed of 30 citizens and councilors. The modern jury trial was first introduced in the Rhenish provinces in 1798, with a court consisting most commonly of 12 citizens (Bürger).

The system whereby citizens were tried by their peers chosen from the entire community in open court was gradually superseded by an "engine of tyranny and oppression" in Germany in which the process of investigation was secret and life and liberty depended upon judges appointed by the state. In Constance the jury trial was suppressed by decree of the Habsburg monarchy in 1786. The Frankfurt Constitution of the failed Revolutions of 1848 called for jury trials for "the more serious crimes and all political offenses", but was never implemented. An 1873 draft on criminal procedure produced by the Prussian Ministry of Justice proposed to abolish the jury and replace it with the mixed system, causing a significant political debate.

The Kingdom of Hanover during the Confederation was the first to provide a mixed system of judges and lay judges in 1850, which was quickly adopted by a number of other states, with the Hanoverian legislation providing the model for the contemporary Schöffengericht (lay judge or mixed court). The German code on court constitution called Gerichtsverfassungsgesetz (GVG) of 27 January 1877 provided that the Schwurgericht (jury court) would consist of three judges and twelve jurymen, alongside the mixed court, with the jury court reserved for serious crimes except political crimes. Lay judges were in use in the Bavarian People's Court of November 1918 to May 1924, and the infamous Nazi People's Court.

The jury was abolished by the Emminger Reform of 4 January 1924, ostensibly as an emergency, money-saving measure in a period of acute financial stringency, during an Article 48 state of emergency and its enabling act caused by events surrounding the occupation of the Ruhr. The emergency decree abolished the jury in the Schwurgericht and replaced it with a mixed system of three professional judges and six lay judges, but kept the original name. In 1934, nomination of Jews and Communists as lay judges was forbidden, and selection was restricted to Nazi supporters. Between 1948 and 1950 in American-occupied Germany and the Federal Republic of Germany, Bavaria returned to the jury trial as it had existed before the emergency decrees, but they were again abolished by the 1950 Unification Act (Vereinheitlichungsgesetz) for the Federal Republic. In 1974 the number of lay judges in the Schwurgericht was further reduced from six to two and in 1993 the number of professional judges was reduced from three to two.

Nowadays, Schwurgericht appears as embodiment for three special task areas of the Große Strafkammer (Grand Penal Chamber) at a Landgericht (medium court level of a German federal state's jurisdiction), and again consists of three professional and two lay judges.

Its three competences are

1. mainly heavy crimes resulting in death of a person (except negligence), or similar heavy crimes like inducing nuclear explosion, and crimes that may result in a punishment over four years, acting as first instance for those crimes,
2. for preventive detention decisions or official consignment to a mental hospital, and
3. if complexity or difficulty of the case requires a third professional judge.

While a Große Strafkammer can usually decide before or at start of a trial to limit itself to two professional judges and two lay jurymen, it cannot do so if it has to function in the above-mentioned three cases.

In 1979, the United States tried the East German LOT Flight 165 hijacking suspects in the United States Court for Berlin in West Berlin, which declared the defendants had the right to a jury trial under the United States Constitution, and hence were tried by a West German jury.

=== Soviet Union ===
Trial by jury was first introduced in the Russian Empire as a result of the Judicial reform of Alexander II in 1864, and abolished after the October Revolution in 1917.

Lay judges were in use in the Soviet Union. After a 1958 reform they were elected for 2 years at general meetings of colleagues at their place of work or residence, or at higher levels appointed by the soviet. The incidence of lay judges overruling professional judges was rare, and was officially reported in only 1 case by the late 1960s. Unlike the juries of the United States, lay judges were not selected from panels that are cross-sections of the entire population, but selected by institutions in each district.

The jury trial was reintroduced in Russia in 1993, and extended to another 69 regions in 2003.

=== Yugoslavia ===
Lay judges were in use in the Federal Republic of Yugoslavia, including the Autonomous Province of Kosovo and Metohija. Yugoslav trial courts consisted of 1 judge and 2 lay judges or 2 judges and 3 lay judges. Yugoslav law did not specify the qualifications (or disqualifications), and it was noted in the report by United Nations Special Rapporteur Elisabeth Rehn that in a particular case they were both retired police officers and one was reportedly a former head of the Criminal Investigation Department.

Lay judges in the district and regional courts were traditionally appointed by the assembly of the relevant socio-political community. In 1991, Serbia completely centralized the Kosovar judges' appointment and dismissal, including lay judges.

== See also ==
- Jury
- Judge
- Lay assessor
- Side judge
