= Emminger Reform =

Emergency decree of the Weimar Republic

The Emminger Decree or Emminger Reform (German: Emminger-Verordnung, Lex Emminger, or Emmingersche Justizreform; formally the Verordnung über Gerichtsverfassung und Strafrechtspflege (Court Organisation and Criminal Justice Regulations)) was an emergency decree in the democratic Weimar Republic by Justice Minister Erich Emminger (BVP) on 4 January 1924 that among other things abolished the jury as trier of fact and replaced it with a mixed system of judges and lay judges in Germany's judiciary which still exists today.

== Background ==
The modern jury trial was first introduced in the Rhenish provinces in 1798, with a court consisting most commonly of 12 citizens (Bürgers). A Swabian ordinance of 1562 had also called for the summons of jurymen (urtheiler), and various methods were in use in Emmendingen, Oppenau, and Oberkirch. Hauenstein's charter of 1442 secured the right to be tried in all cases by 24 fellow equals, and in Friburg the jury was composed of 30 citizens and councilors. In Constance the jury trial was suppressed by decree of the Habsburg monarchy in 1786. The Frankfurt Constitution of the failed Revolutions of 1848 called for jury trials for "the more serious crimes and all political offenses" but was never implemented.

Germany's system whereby citizens were tried by their peers chosen from the entire community in open court was gradually superseded by a system of professional judges, in which the process of investigation was more or less confidential and judgements were issued by judges appointed by the state. There was an 1873 proposal by the Prussian Ministry of Justice to abolish the jury and replace it with the mixed system. The jury system was implemented in the German Empire by the Gerichtsverfassungsgesetz (GVG) of 27 January 1877 with the jury court (Schwurgericht) consisting of 3 judges and 12 jurymen. The Weimar Republic was created in 1919, when German Empire Chancellor Friedrich Ebert signed the Weimar Constitution into law on 11 August 1919.

On 11 January 1923, the Belgian and French Armies initiated the Occupation of the Ruhr that would last until 25 August 1925, in response to the Weimar Republic's default on its World War I reparations in the aftermath of World War I. In May 1923, Justice Minister Rudolf Heinze (DVP) under Chancellor Wilhelm Cuno attempted to replace the jury system with large lay judge (Schöffen) courts but was defeated in the Reichstag. An Article 48 (of the Weimar Constitution) state of emergency was proclaimed by President Ebert on 26 or 27 September 1923, lasting until February 1924, in tandem with the announcement by Chancellor Gustav Stresemann of the end to the resistance against the Occupation of the Ruhr. Hyperinflation in the Weimar Republic would reach its peak in November 1923. On 8 December 1923, the Reichstag passed an enabling act (Marxsches Ermächtigungsgesetz) empowering the government to take all measures it deemed necessary and urgent, with regard to the state of emergency, lasting until 15 February 1924. Acts passed pursuant to Article 48 emergencies and their enabling acts are referred to as Notverordnung, or emergency decrees.

== Abolition ==
On 4 January 1924, Justice Minister Erich Emminger (BVP) under Chancellor Wilhelm Marx (Centre Party) issued the Verordnung über Gerichtsverfassung und Strafrechtspflege (Emminger Reform), which abolished juries in the Schwurgericht, replacing them with a mixed system of three professional judges and six lay judges, but kept the original name. The reform was presented as an emergency, money-saving measure in a period of acute financial stringency. Although a special meeting of the German Bar (Deutscher Anwaltverein) demanded the revocation of the decrees, and the Social Democrats called the reform a flagrant usurpation of the clearly expressed wishes of the Reichstag, the decrees did not cause much commotion.

== Aftermath ==
The use of lay judges was completely eliminated on the first day of World War II, with the exception of the infamous People's Court. The jury system has never been reintroduced in Germany, but between 1948 and 1950, prior to the foundation of the Federal Republic of Germany, Bavaria returned to jury trial, as it had existed before the Emminger Decrees. In 1974 the number of lay judges in the Schwurgericht was further reduced from six to two.

== See also ==
- LOT_Flight_165_hijacking#Trial
- United States Court for Berlin
