= Keoma (film) =

1976 film

- Italian film poster
- Directed by: Enzo G. Castellari
- Screenplay by: Mino Roli; Nico Ducci; Luigi Montefiori; Enzo G. Castellari; Dialogue: Joshua Sinclair (uncredited)
- Story by: Luigi Montefiori
- Produced by: Manolo Bolognini
- Starring: Franco Nero; William Berger; Olga Karlatos; Woody Strode
- Cinematography: Aiace Parolin
- Edited by: Gianfranco Amicucci
- Music by: Guido & Maurizio De Angelis
- Production company: Uranos Cinematografica
- Distributed by: F.A.R. International Films
- Release date: 25 November 1976 (Italy)
- Running time: 101 minutes
- Country: Italy
- Languages: Italian; English
- Box office: ₤1.571 billion (Italian lira)

Keoma is a 1976 Italian spaghetti Western film directed by Enzo G. Castellari and starring Franco Nero. It is frequently regarded as one of the better "twilight" spaghetti Westerns, being one of the last films of its genre, and is known for its incorporation of newer cinematic techniques of the time (such as slow motion and close/medium panning shots) and its vocal soundtrack by Guido & Maurizio De Angelis.

== Plot ==
After the American Civil War, ex-Union soldier Keoma Shannon, part-Indian and part-White, returns to his hometown to find his half-brothers in alliance with a petty tyrant named Caldwell. Caldwell and his gang rule over the town with an iron fist. With the help of his father and George, an old Black friend, he vows revenge. Keoma also shows compassion when he saves a pregnant woman from a group sent by Caldwell's group to be quarantined in a mine camp full of plague victims. Keoma is constantly visited by the apparition of an older woman ("the Witch") who saved him during the massacre of an Indian camp.

== Cast ==
- Franco Nero as Keoma Shannon
- William Berger as William H. Shannon
- Olga Karlatos as Liza Farrow
- Woody Strode as George
- Orso Maria Guerrini as Butch Shannon
- Gabriella Giacobbe as The Witch
- Antonio Marsina as Lenny Shannon
- John Loffredo as Sam Shannon
- Donald O'Brian as Caldwell
- Leon Lenoir as León Lenoir, The Doctor
- Wolfango Soldati as Wolf, Confederate Soldier
- Victoria Zinny as Brothel Owner
- Riccardo Pizzuti as Slade
- Alfio Caltabiano as Clay

== Production ==
While participating in the filming of 21 Hours at Munich, Franco Nero was approached by his longtime friend and collaborator Enzo G. Castellari and producer Manolo Bolognini on the proposition of appearing in a spaghetti Western, despite dwindling demand for films of that genre. At the time, no stories or scripts had been written - Nero, Castellari, and Bolognini did, however, decide to name their pet project Keoma, which was a Native American name that, according to Bolognini, meant "freedom" (in reality, the name means "far away").

Keoma was reportedly planned as a sequel to Sergio Corbucci's Django, which Bolognini co-produced. The original treatment was written by actor George Eastman (Luigi Montefiori) and developed into a script by Mino Roli and Nico Ducci, neither of whom was an experienced writer of spaghetti Westerns. Roli and Ducci's screenplay arrived three days after shooting began and was quickly thrown out by Castellari and Nero, unanimously believing that it was not appropriate for a Western. Castellari proceeded to rewrite the script on a daily basis throughout filming, taking suggestions from cast and crew members, as well as being influenced by the works of Shakespeare and Sam Peckinpah, among other sources. Most of the dialogue as it appears in the film was written by actor John Loffredo, although Nero also contributed a substantial number of his own lines, including his final exchange with "the Witch". In a 2012 interview, Nero explained that he lifted a line from a book called The Cowboy and the Cossack, by Nero's friend Claire Huffaker, for the scene with the Witch.

The film was shot over a period of eight weeks, with most principal photography being done at the Elios Studios in Rome, where Corbucci had previously filmed Django. The studio's set was in dire need of repair, which made it easier for Castellari to film as they did not have to redress the sets. The film was also shot on location at Lago di Camposecco.

According to Nero, the music by Guido & Maurizio De Angelis was inspired by Leonard Cohen.

== Release ==
Keoma premièred in Italy on November 25, 1976, and was considered a mild success in Italy at the time. The film grossed a total of 1,571,995,000 Italian lira in Italy on its theatrical release.

It was later released on Blu-ray by Mill Creek Entertainment as a double feature with The Grand Duel using a restored print.

Some countries promoted the film as a Django film. These included France (Django Rides Again) and West Germany (Django's Great Return). In the UK, the film was released in 1977 by Intercontinental Films as The Violent Breed, while Vadib Productions released the film in the United States as Keoma, the Avenger in 1978. Spanish promotion for the film lists Sergio Leone as a producer, but he is not credited anywhere else.

== Reception ==
Contemporarily, the Monthly Film Bulletin reviewed a dubbed 85-minute version of the film, which noted that the film was "too severely cut to follow its plot easily let alone its multiple Freudian undercurrents", but stated that "visually it has many impressive if conventional aspects", noting the introduction and various flashback scenes. The review also praised Franco Nero as "endlessly enjoyable" and concluded that Keoma "is an effective reminder that the Italian Western was always formally more intriguing than its critics would have one believe."

In a retrospective review, AllMovie gave the film four stars out of five, and referred to the film as one of the "finest efforts" of the spaghetti Western genre. The review noted that the "plentiful gunplay is choreographed with balletic grandeur, the camera work is sweeping and lyrical" and Luigi Montefiore's script "is heavy with spiritual metaphor while still adhering to established Western tenets." AllMovie also commented on the score as "the film's sole drawback", finding it "often tone-deaf".

== See also ==
- List of Italian films of 1976
