= Robert Kirsch (judge) =

American judge (born 1966)

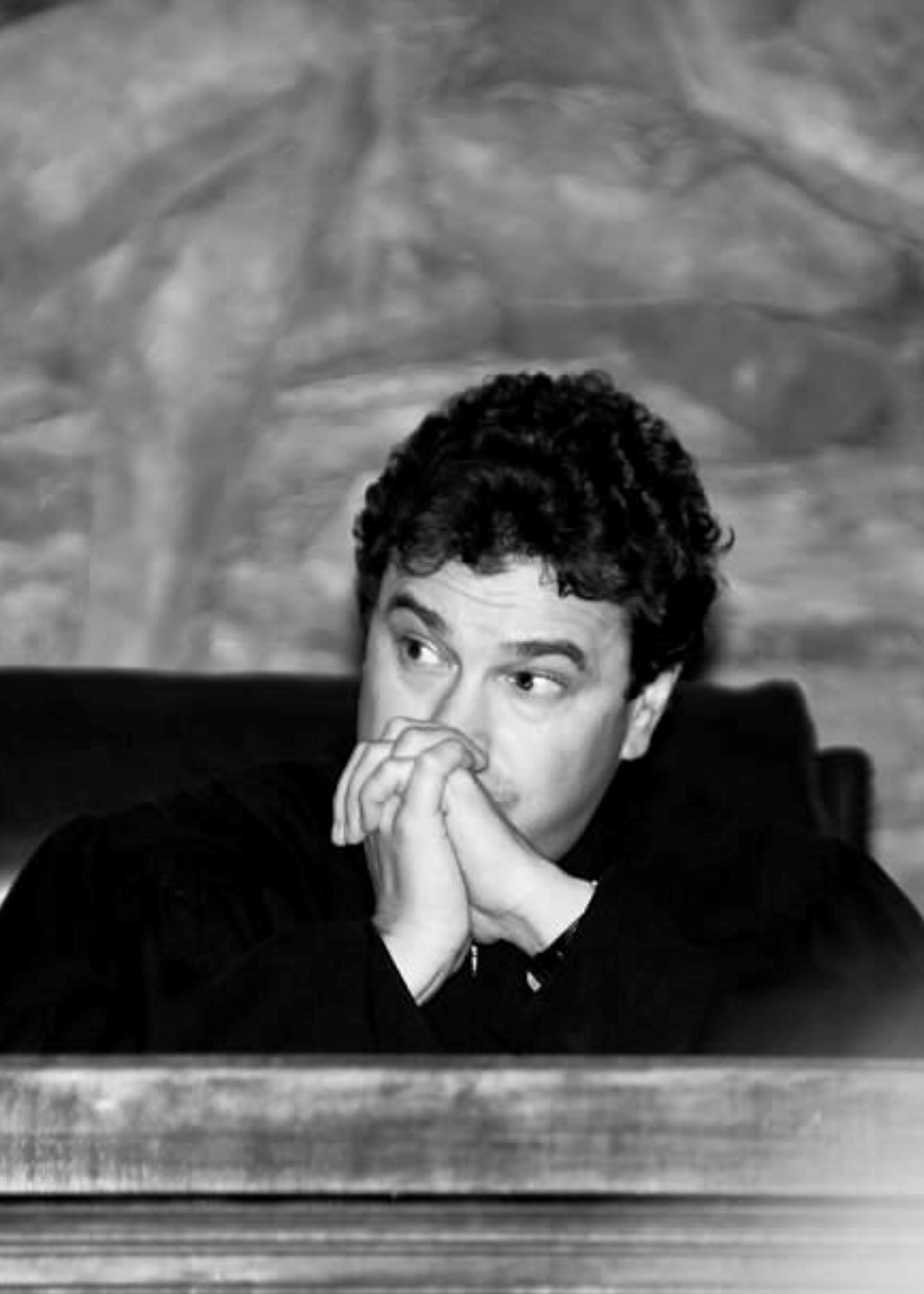
- Kirsch on the bench at the Union County Superior Court in 2021

Judge of the United States District Court for the District of New Jersey
- Incumbent
- Assumed office May 8, 2023
- Appointed by: Joe Biden
- Preceded by: Freda L. Wolfson

Judge of the New Jersey Superior Court for Union County
- In office 2010 – May 8, 2023

Personal details
- Born: Robert Andrew Kirsch; 1966 (age 59–60) Livingston, New Jersey, U.S.
- Party: Republican (before 2021); Independent (2021–present)
- Education: Emory University (BA); Fordham University (JD)

Robert Andrew Kirsch (born 1966) is a United States district judge of the United States District Court for the District of New Jersey. He was an appellate court judge on the New Jersey Superior Court from 2010 to 2023.

== Education ==
Born in Livingston, New Jersey, Kirsch grew up in South Orange, New Jersey, and attended Columbia High School. He received a Bachelor of Arts from Emory University where he graduated magna cum laude in 1988. He received his Juris Doctor from Fordham University School of Law in 1991.

== Career ==
From 1991 to 1993, Kirsch served as a law clerk for Judge William J. Zloch of the United States District Court for the Southern District of Florida. In 1993, he joined the Civil Division of the U.S. Department of Justice in Washington, D.C through Attorney General Honor's Program. He served as a trial attorney for the Department of Justice until 1997.

From 1997 to 2010, Kirsch served as an Assistant United States Attorney in the U.S. Attorney's Office for the District of New Jersey. During his time there, Kirsch focused on prosecuting white collar crime and earned numerous awards, including the US Customs Service award for Outstanding Service and a nomination for the Attorney General's Director's Award for Superb Performance.

Between 2010 and 2023, Kirsch served as an appellate judge on the New Jersey Superior Court for Union County. In this role, he served as a judge for the Family Division, Civil Division, and Criminal Division.

Since joining the bench, Judge Kirsch has frequently participated in panels, lectured, and given presentations to local bar associations and law schools including Columbia University School of Law, Seton Hall Law School, and New York University School of Law.

=== Notable cases ===
==== United States v. Puff ====
While serving as an Assistant United States Attorney, Kirsch served as a prosecutor in United States v. Puff. In this capacity, he investigated and prosecuted individuals for their roles in a Ponzi and mortgage fraud scheme, which defrauded more than 400 investors and financial institutions of more than $100 million.

United States v. Urciuoli

In 2007 and 2008, Kirsch also investigated and prosecuted a number of officers in a prominent information technologies firm for defrauding investors by falsely inflating stated revenue and profits and defrauding investors of more than $5 million. The criminal defendant was convicted of wire fraud and obstruction of justice, and was sentenced to nine years in prison.

=== Federal judicial service ===
Kirsch was recommended for the court seat by Senator Robert Menendez. On December 21, 2022, President Joe Biden announced his intent to nominate Kirsch to serve as a United States district judge of the United States District Court for the District of New Jersey. On January 3, 2023, his nomination was sent to the Senate. President Biden nominated Kirsch to the seat vacated by Judge Freda L. Wolfson, who retired on February 1, 2023. On January 25, 2023, a hearing on his nomination was held before the Senate Judiciary Committee. On April 20, 2023, his nomination was reported out of committee by a 13–8 vote. On May 2, 2023, the United States Senate invoked cloture on his nomination by a 57–42 vote. Later that day, his nomination was confirmed by a 57–42 vote. He received his judicial commission on May 8, 2023.

In 2023, a report by the Transactional Records Access Clearinghouse named Kirsch as one of the most productive judges on the United States District Court for the District of New Jersey, citing the fact that he had closed more than 99% of cases assigned to him during his first year on the bench.

== Personal life ==
Kirsch was a Republican until 2021, when he changed his registration to unaffiliated after the January 6 United States Capitol attack.

Legal offices
Preceded by Freda L. Wolfson	Judge of the United States District Court for the District of New Jersey; 2023–present	Incumbent
