= Renée Marie Bumb =

American judge (born 1960)

Renée Bumb

Chief Judge of the United States District Court for the District of New Jersey
- Incumbent
- Assumed office February 1, 2023
- Preceded by: Freda L. Wolfson

Judge of the United States District Court for the District of New Jersey
- Incumbent
- Assumed office June 12, 2006
- Appointed by: George W. Bush
- Preceded by: William H. Walls

Personal details
- Born: 1960 (age 65–66) Bellevue, Ohio, U.S.
- Education: Ohio State University (BA); University of Chicago (MA); Rutgers University, Newark (JD)

Renée Marie Bumb (born 1960) is the chief United States district judge of the United States District Court for the District of New Jersey.

== Early life and education ==
Bumb was born in Bellevue, Ohio. She graduated from Ohio State University with her Bachelor of Arts degree in 1981 and later from the University of Chicago where she earned her Master of Arts degree in 1983. Bumb attended Rutgers School of Law–Newark and graduated with a Juris Doctor in 1987.

== Career ==
Bumb was a law clerk for Judge Garrett Brown Jr. of the United States District Court for the District of New Jersey from 1987 to 1988. She was in private practice in New Jersey from 1988 to 1991. She was an assistant United States attorney of the District of New Jersey from 1991 to 2006.

=== Federal judicial service ===
In 2006, Bumb was nominated to the United States District Court for the District of New Jersey by President George W. Bush on January 25, 2006, to a seat vacated by Judge William H. Walls. Bumb was confirmed by the United States Senate on June 6, 2006, by an 89–0 vote. She received her commission on June 12, 2006. She became chief judge on February 1, 2023, after the retirement of Freda L. Wolfson.

== Sources ==
Legal offices
Preceded by William H. Walls	Judge of the United States District Court for the District of New Jersey; 2006–present	Incumbent
Preceded by Freda L. Wolfson	Chief Judge of the United States District Court for the District of New Jersey; 2023–present	Incumbent
