= Judgment in Berlin =

1984 book by Herbert Jay Stern

- Author: Herbert Jay Stern
- Language: English
- Genre: Non-fiction
- Publisher: Palgrave Macmillan
- Publication date: 1984
- ISBN: 9780876634417

Judgment in Berlin is a 1984 book by federal judge Herbert Jay Stern about a hijacking trial in the United States Court for Berlin in 1979, over which he presided.

From the end of World War II in Europe in May 1945 until the reunification of Germany in October 1990, Berlin was divided into four sectors: the American Sector, the French Sector, the British Sector, and the Soviet Sector, each named after the occupying power. The Soviet sector, informally called East Berlin, was considered by East Germany, then a member of the Warsaw Pact, to be part of its territory and in fact its capital, and the American, French, and British Sectors, collectively called West Berlin, were in some respects governed as if they were a part of West Germany, a member of NATO. Seldom did the American government exercise power directly in the American sector, except as it affected American military forces stationed in Berlin. In particular, the judgeship of the United States Court for Berlin was vacant except during the trial over which Judge Stern presided.

In 1978, after prodigious diplomatic efforts, NATO had convinced the Warsaw Pact states to sign an international convention on hijacking, in which each signatory state promised to punish hijackers who landed in their territory.

On 30 August 1978, Hans Detlef Alexander Tiede and Ingrid Ruske, both East Germans, used a starting pistol (not an actual gun) to hijack a Polish passenger aircraft (LOT Polish Airlines Flight 165) from Gdańsk bound for East Berlin's Schönefeld Airport and diverted it instead to the U.S. Air Force base at Tempelhof Airport in West Berlin. The West German government was very reluctant to prosecute Tiede and Ruske because of the West German policy of supporting the right of East Germans to flee oppression in the GDR. However, the NATO members did not want to lose the hijacking treaty on which they had worked for so long. Consequently, the case was prosecuted in the never-before-convened United States Court for Berlin.

Over the prosecutor's objections, Judge Stern ruled that the defendants were entitled to be tried by a jury, a procedure abolished in Germany in 1924. The case against Tiede's co-defendant Ingrid Ruske was dismissed because she had not been notified of her Miranda rights before signing a confession. The jury found Tiede guilty of hostage-taking, but not guilty of acts against the safety of civil aviation, deprivation of liberty and battery. He was sentenced to time served — about nine months.

A significant subtext in the book is Stern's refusal to accept assertions made by representatives of the United States Department of State that, as the authority appointing the judge for the United States Court for Berlin, it also had the right to control the judge's decision, i.e., tell Stern what to decide. The "time served" sentence, writes Stern, was the only method by which he could protect Tiede from the State Department. Not surprisingly, the State Department and the U.S. Mission to Berlin had a different view of the facts and circumstances.

In 1988, Stern's book was used as the basis for a film of the same name that starred Martin Sheen as Judge Stern, Harris Yulin as Bruno Ristau, and Sean Penn as Witness X.
