= Freda L. Wolfson =

American judge (born 1954)

Chief Judge of the United States District Court for the District of New Jersey
- In office May 16, 2019 – February 1, 2023
- Preceded by: Jose L. Linares
- Succeeded by: Renée Marie Bumb

Judge of the United States District Court for the District of New Jersey
- In office December 4, 2002 – February 1, 2023
- Appointed by: George W. Bush
- Preceded by: Nicholas H. Politan
- Succeeded by: Robert Kirsch

Magistrate Judge of the United States District Court for the District of New Jersey
- In office 1986–2002

Personal details
- Born: 1954 (age 71–72) Vineland, New Jersey, U.S.
- Party: Democratic
- Education: Rutgers University (BA, JD)

Freda Linsenbaum Wolfson (born 1954) is a former United States district judge of the United States District Court for the District of New Jersey.

== Early life and education ==
Born in Vineland, New Jersey, Wolfson graduated from Douglass College in Rutgers University with a Bachelor of Arts degree in 1976 and later from Rutgers Law School in Newark with a Juris Doctor in 1979. A daughter of Holocaust survivors, she credited the experiences of her parents as leading her to pursue a career in law.

== Career ==
Following law school graduation, Wolfson worked in private practice in New Jersey from 1979 to 1986 at the firms Lowenstein, Sandler, Kohl, Fisher & Boylan and Clapp & Eisenberg. Following her retirement from the federal bench, Wolfson rejoined her previous law firm, now known as Lowenstein Sandler, as a partner in the firm and as chair of the firm's alternative dispute resolution group.

=== Federal judicial service ===
Wolfson began her federal judicial career as a United States magistrate judge of the United States District Court for the District of New Jersey. Wolfson was appointed to an eight-year term in 1986 and was re-appointed again in 1994 before serving another full eight-year term before her becoming an Article III judge in 2002.

Wolfson was nominated to the United States District Court for the District of New Jersey by President George W. Bush on August 1, 2002, to a seat vacated by Judge Nicholas H. Politan. Wolfson was confirmed by the Senate on November 14, 2002. She received her commission on December 4, 2002. She became Chief Judge on May 16, 2019, after the retirement of Jose L. Linares. She retired on February 1, 2023, and returned to private practice.

== Sources ==
Legal offices
| Preceded by Nicholas H. Politan | Judge of the United States District Court for the District of New Jersey; 2002–2023 | Succeeded by Robert Kirsch |
| Preceded by Jose L. Linares | Chief Judge of the United States District Court for the District of New Jersey; 2019–2023 | Succeeded by Renée Marie Bumb |
