= Joshua Sinclair =

American actor, writer, filmmaker and physician

- Born: John Louis Loffredo; New York City, New York, U.S.
- Other names: Gianni Loffredo; Gianluigi Loffredo
- Education: University of Virginia; Johns Hopkins University
- Occupations: Actor; writer; producer; director; physician
- Years active: 1970–present

John Louis Loffredo, known by the pen name Joshua Sinclair, is an American writer, actor, filmmaker and physician.

== Early life ==
John Louis Loffredo was born in New York City. He initially planned to be a missionary, and began writing screenplays at the age of 14.

=== Film career ===
In the early 1970s, he moved to Rome, and made his film acting debut in Vittorio De Sica's The Garden of the Finzi-Continis. He appeared in various films, notably several collaborations with Enzo G. Castellari and Roberto Rossellini. He was sometimes credited under the Italianized stage names Gianni Loffredo and Gianluigi Loffredo.

Later in the decade, he moved to Austria.

In 1978, he wrote and produced the film Just a Gigolo, starring David Bowie and Marlene Dietrich. He contributed to the screenplay for Enzo G. Castellari's Spaghetti Western Keoma (1976), Casanova & Co. (1977), and Judgment in Berlin (1988); and wrote The Golden Lady (1979).

In 1985, Sinclair published the historical novel Shaka Zulu, based on the life of the 19th-century Zulu King. The following year, the novel was adapted into a SABC miniseries of the same name in 1986. In 2001, he wrote and directed a sequel telefilm, Shaka Zulu: The Citadel.

In 2018, he wrote and directed the film A Rose in Winter, a biopic of Edith Stein (Saint Teresa of the Cross).

=== Medicine ===
In the 1980s, Sinclair left acting to pursue a career in medicine. He graduated from the University of Virginia and Johns Hopkins University, as an M.D. with a specialization in tropical medicine. As a member of Médecins Sans Frontières, he worked at Grant Medical College in India (where he worked with Mother Teresa) and Chris Hani Baragwanath Hospital in South Africa.

== Filmography ==
| Year | Title | Role | Notes |
|---|---|---|---|
| 1970 | The Garden of the Finzi-Continis | | |
| 1971 | La lunga spiaggia fredda | Thomas | |
| 1971 | Lady Frankenstein | John | |
| 1971 | A Season in Hell | Young Rimbaud | |
| 1972 | The Assassination of Trotsky | Sam | |
| 1972 | Winged Devils | | |
| 1973 | I Kiss the Hand | Stefano Ferrante | Actor |
| 1973 | Non ho tempo | | |
| 1975 | Il messia | Guardia Romana | Uncredited |
| 1976 | The Big Racket | Rudy | |
| 1976 | Keoma | Sam Shannon | Actor, writer |
| 1977 | The Heroin Busters | Gianni | |
| 1977 | Hitch-Hike | Oaks | |
| 1977 | Casanova & Co. | | Writer |
| 1978 | The Inglorious Bastards | The Sergeant | |
| 1978 | Ring | Don Farracone | |
| 1978 | Just a Gigolo | | Writer, Co-Executive Producer |
| 1979 | The Golden Lady | | Writer |
| 1980 | The Last Shark | Mayor William Wells | Actor |
| 1982 | 1990: The Bronx Warriors | Ice | Actor |
| 1986 | Shaka Zulu | | Television series, based on Sinclair's own novel, Writer |
| 1987 | Hangmen | Phillipe Fosterlan | |
| 1988 | Judgment in Berlin | Alan Sherman | Actor, writer, producer |
| 2001 | Shaka Zulu - Last Great Warrior | Director | |
| 2007 | Jump! | Director | |
| 2018 | A Rose in Winter | | Director, writer |
