= Leonard I. Garth =

American judge (1921–2016)

Senior Judge of the United States Court of Appeals for the Third Circuit
- In office June 30, 1986 – September 22, 2016

Judge of the United States Court of Appeals for the Third Circuit
- In office August 6, 1973 – June 30, 1986
- Appointed by: Richard Nixon
- Preceded by: James Rosen
- Succeeded by: Morton Ira Greenberg

Judge of the United States District Court for the District of New Jersey
- In office December 18, 1969 – August 29, 1973
- Appointed by: Richard Nixon
- Preceded by: Thomas M. Madden
- Succeeded by: Herbert Jay Stern

Personal details
- Born: April 7, 1921 Brooklyn, New York, U.S.
- Died: September 22, 2016 (aged 95)
- Spouse: Sarah Kaufman (m. 1942; died 2015)
- Education: Columbia University (BA); Harvard University (LLB)

Leonard I. Garth (April 7, 1921 – September 22, 2016) was a United States circuit judge of the United States Court of Appeals for the Third Circuit and previously was a United States district judge of the United States District Court for the District of New Jersey.

== Early life and career ==
Garth was born in Brooklyn, New York, and graduated with a Bachelor of Arts degree from Columbia University in 1942. He served during World War II as a United States Army Lieutenant from 1943 to 1946. Upon his return, he received his Bachelor of Laws from Harvard Law School in 1952, and built a private practice in Paterson, New Jersey.

=== Federal judicial service ===
On July 22, 1969, Garth was nominated by President Richard Nixon to a seat on the United States District Court for the District of New Jersey vacated by Judge Thomas M. Madden. Garth was confirmed by the United States Senate on December 17, 1969, and received his commission on December 18, 1969. His service terminated on August 29, 1973, due to his elevation to the Third Circuit.

On July 19, 1973, President Nixon nominated Garth to a seat on the United States Court of Appeals for the Third Circuit vacated by Judge James Rosen. Garth was confirmed by the Senate on August 3, 1973, and received his commission on August 6, 1973. He assumed senior status on June 30, 1986, serving in that status until his death on September 22, 2016.

Concurrent with his federal court service, Garth was a lecturer at Rutgers Law School starting in 1978 and at Seton Hall University School of Law starting in 1980.

=== Notable case ===
Garth wrote the opinion in Sullivan v. Barnett, 139 F.3d 158 (3d Cir. 1998). This decision was reversed by the United States Supreme Court in American Manufacturers Mutual Insurance Company v. Sullivan, 526 U.S. 40 (1999).

== Notable clerks ==
Supreme Court Justice Samuel Alito clerked for Garth from 1976 to 1977 in his first job out of law school. Law professors who clerked for Judge Garth include former Co-Dean Ronald Chen of Rutgers Law School, Orin Kerr of Stanford Law School, Norman I. Silber of Hofstra Law School (and Research Scholar at Yale Law School), Louis Virelli of Stetson Law School, and Benjamin Levin of Washington University School of Law. Harvey Rishikof is Professor of Law and National Security Studies at the National War College and previously the Dean of Roger Williams University School of Law.

== Personal life ==
In 1942, he married Sarah Kaufman, and they had a daughter.

== See also ==
- List of Jewish American jurists
- List of United States federal judges by longevity of service

Legal offices
Preceded by Thomas M. Madden	Judge of the United States District Court for the District of New Jersey; 1969–1973	Succeeded by Herbert Jay Stern
Preceded by James Rosen	Judge of the United States Court of Appeals for the Third Circuit; 1973–1986	Succeeded by Morton Ira Greenberg
