= LOT Polish Airlines Flight 165 (1978) =

1978 aircraft hijacking

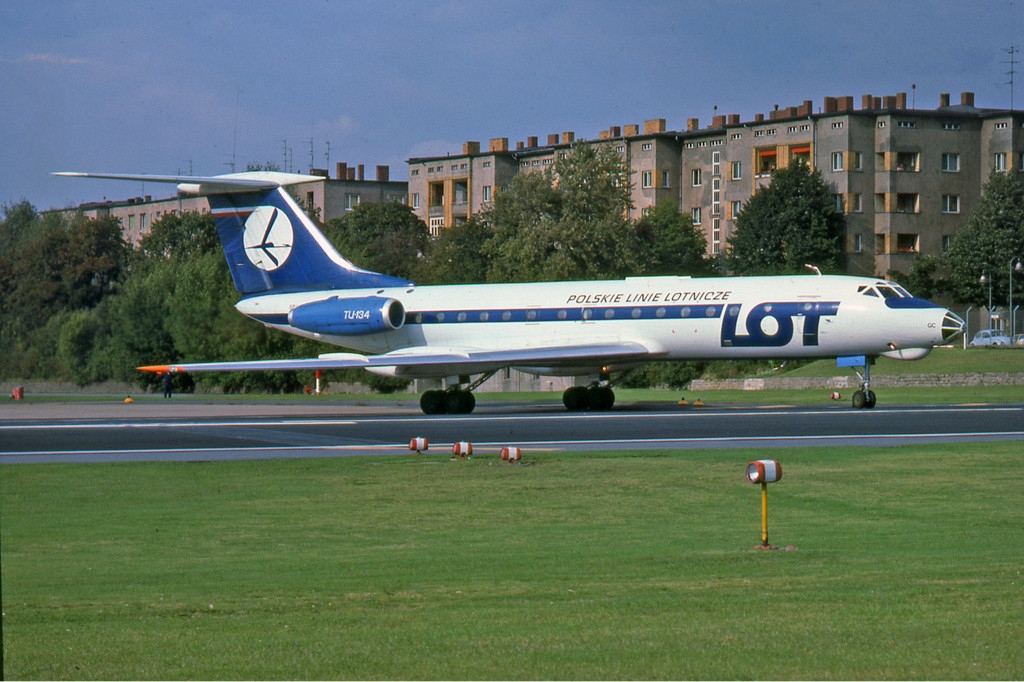
- The hijacked Tu-134 at Tempelhof on 30 August 1978, shortly after the hijacking.

Hijacking
- Date: 30 August 1978
- Summary: Hijacking
- Site: U.S. Air Force, Tempelhof Airport, West Berlin

Aircraft
- Aircraft type: Tupolev Tu-134
- Operator: LOT Polish Airlines
- Registration: SP-LGC
- Flight origin: Gdańsk Airport
- Destination: Schönefeld Airport
- Occupants: 69
- Passengers: 62
- Crew: 7
- Fatalities: 0
- Injuries: 0
- Survivors: 69

LOT Polish Airlines Flight 165 was a LOT Polish Airlines flight that was hijacked on 30 August 1978. The hijackers from East Germany (GDR) were trying to flee from the GDR and seek political asylum in West Germany (FRG). The plane landed safely, and the primary hijacker was tried and convicted by a West German jury in the United States Court for Berlin and sentenced to time served, the nine months he had already served during pretrial detention. This was the only case heard before the United States Court for Berlin.

== Background ==
The GDR citizens Hans Detlef Alexander Tiede (aka Detlev Tiede) and his friend Ingrid Ruske and her 12-year-old daughter had travelled to Poland to meet with Ruske's West German boyfriend Horst Fischer, who had planned to bring forged West German papers to enable their escape by ferry to West German Travemünde. However, Fischer did not turn up, and after four days of waiting for him Ruske and Tiede – not having any information as to his whereabouts – concluded that Fischer must have been arrested when travelling through East Germany. Their conclusion was right, as Fischer had indeed been arrested and would later be sentenced to eight years of jail in East Germany for preparing their Republikflucht ("desertion from the Republic"), a crime under GDR law.

Ruske and Tiede then concluded that they were trapped and that prison awaited them if they returned to East Germany. So they developed a plan to hijack a plane headed for East Berlin's Schönefeld Airport and force a landing at the U.S. Air Force base at Tempelhof Airport in West Berlin. They bought a toy starting pistol at a Polish flea market, and then booked three tickets on LOT Polish Airlines Flight 165 from Gdańsk, Poland, to East Berlin.

== Hijacking ==
On 30 August 1978, Tiede and Ruske hijacked a Polish LOT Tupolev Tu-134 airliner with 62 passengers operating Flight 165 from Gdańsk to East Berlin. Tiede, armed with the toy starting pistol, took a flight attendant hostage and succeeded in forcing the aircraft to land at Tempelhof Airport in West Berlin.

Of the 62 passengers, there were 50 GDR citizens, 10 Polish citizens, a man from Munich and a woman from West Berlin. The passengers were given the opportunity to remain in West Berlin or to return to East Berlin. Not only did Tiede, Ruske and her daughter claim sanctuary in West Berlin, but so did another seven East Germans: a radiology assistant from Erfurt, a couple with two children and a couple from Leipzig, although the radiology assistant returned to East Germany the next day. The remaining passengers were interviewed and taken to East Berlin on a bus.

== Trial ==
The West German Federal Government was unwilling to prosecute Tiede and Ruske because of the West German policy of supporting the right of East Germans to flee oppression in the GDR. The United States government had successfully persuaded the East German government to sign a hijacking treaty. Consequently, the case was prosecuted in the United States Court for Berlin, with charges bought under the terms of The Hague Convention as incorporated into the laws of the United States, as the plane landed at a US Air Force base.

US federal judge Herbert Jay Stern ruled that the defendants were entitled to be tried by a jury, as guaranteed by the Sixth Amendment to the United States Constitution, a procedure abolished in Germany by the Emminger Reform of 1924. The case against Tiede's co-defendant Ingrid Ruske was dismissed because she had not been notified of her legal rights before signing a confession. Tiede was acquitted on three charges, including hijacking and possession of a firearm, but convicted of taking a hostage. The jury found Tiede guilty of hostage-taking, but not guilty of acts against the safety of civil aviation, deprivation of liberty and battery. The minimum sentence for hostage-taking was three years. However, Stern sentenced Tiede to time served during pretrial detention, about nine months. Stern accounted for Tiede's emergency situation and plight to face imprisonment in East Germany for attempted Republikflucht.

== In popular culture ==
The 1984 book which Judge Stern wrote about the event, Judgment in Berlin, was made into a movie of the same name in 1988. Martin Sheen depicted him.

== See also ==
- Eastern Bloc emigration and defection
- Pan Am Flight 103 bombing trial, another trial by judges from a judiciary other than the host nation
