= Michael Chertoff =

American government official (born 1953)

Mike Chertoff
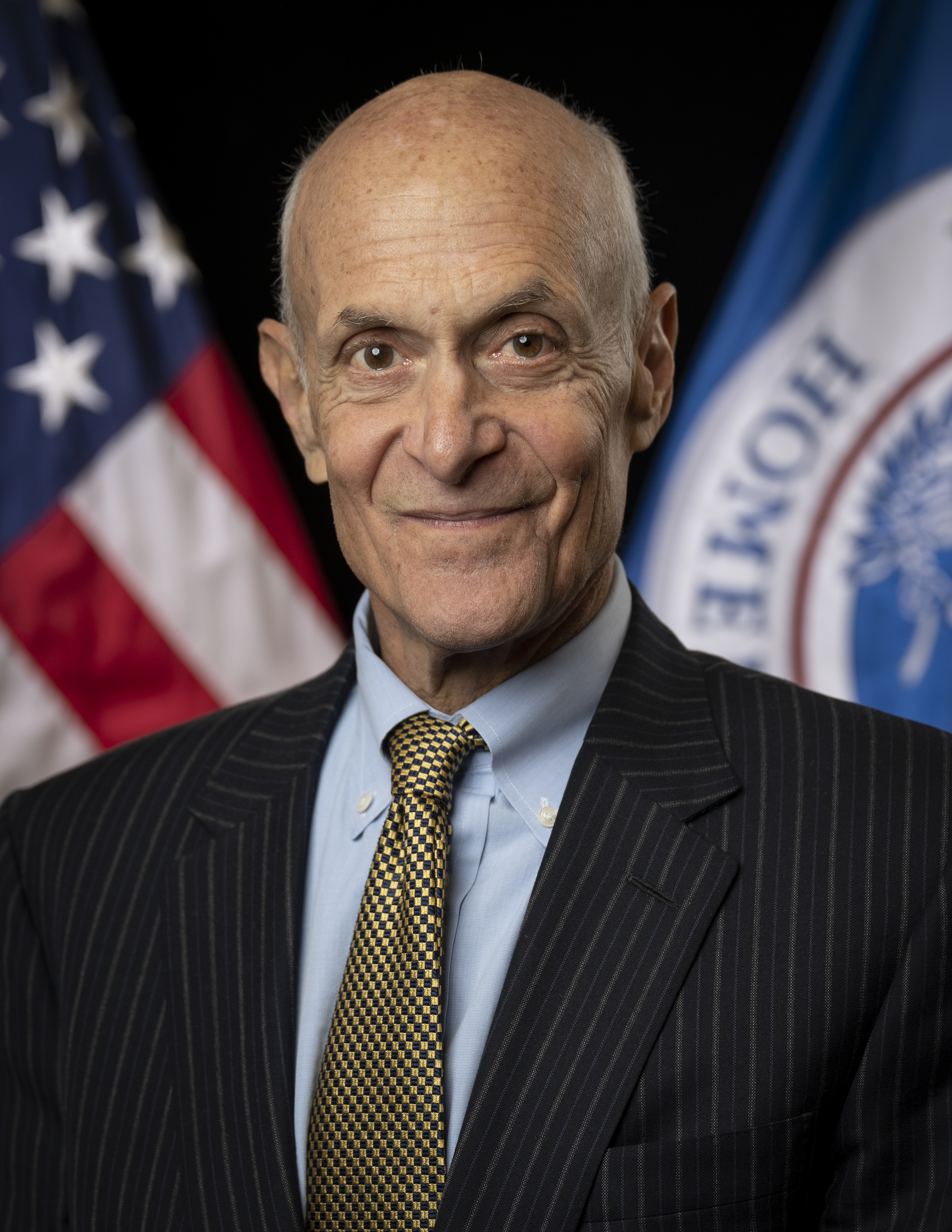
- Official portrait, 2022

2nd United States Secretary of Homeland Security
- In office February 15, 2005 – January 21, 2009
- President: George W. Bush; Barack Obama
- Preceded by: James Loy (acting); Tom Ridge
- Succeeded by: Janet Napolitano

Judge of the United States Court of Appeals for the Third Circuit
- In office June 10, 2003 – February 15, 2005
- Appointed by: George W. Bush
- Preceded by: Morton Ira Greenberg
- Succeeded by: Michael Chagares

United States Assistant Attorney General for the Criminal Division
- In office January 20, 2001 – June 10, 2003
- President: George W. Bush
- Preceded by: James Robinson
- Succeeded by: Christopher A. Wray

United States Attorney for the District of New Jersey
- In office 1990–1994
- President: George H. W. Bush; Bill Clinton
- Preceded by: Samuel Alito
- Succeeded by: Faith S. Hochberg

Personal details
- Born: November 28, 1953 (age 72) Elizabeth, New Jersey, U.S.
- Party: Republican
- Spouse: Meryl Justin (m. 1988)
- Children: 2
- Education: Harvard University (BA, JD)

Michael Chertoff (born November 28, 1953) is an American attorney who was the second United States secretary of homeland security to serve under President George W. Bush. Chertoff also served for one additional day under President Barack Obama. He was the co-author of the USA PATRIOT Act. Chertoff previously was a United States circuit judge of the United States Court of Appeals for the Third Circuit, a federal prosecutor, and Assistant U.S. Attorney General. He succeeded Tom Ridge as U.S. Secretary of Homeland Security on February 15, 2005.

Since leaving government service, he co-founded the Chertoff Group, a risk-management and security consulting company. He has also worked as senior of counsel at the Washington, D.C. law firm of Covington & Burling. He is also the chair and a member of the board of trustees at the international freedom watchdog Freedom House.

== Early life and education ==
Michael Chertoff was born to Gershon Baruch Chertoff (1915–96), a rabbi and Talmudic scholar who was the leader of Congregation B'nai Israel in Elizabeth, New Jersey, and Livia Chertoff (née Eisen), a Polish–born Israeli American who was the first flight attendant for El Al. His paternal grandparents are Paul Chertoff, a rabbi and professor of Talmud, and Esther Barish Chertoff.

Chertoff attended the Jewish Educational Center in Elizabeth as well as the Pingry School. He graduated from Harvard College with a Bachelor of Arts degree in 1975. During his sophomore year, he studied abroad at the London School of Economics and Political Science. He then attended Harvard Law School, where he worked as a research assistant for John Hart Ely on his book Democracy and Distrust. Chertoff received a Juris Doctor, magna cum laude, in 1978.

== Career ==
Following his law school graduation, Chertoff served as a law clerk to Judge Murray Gurfein of the United States Court of Appeals for the Second Circuit and later for United States Supreme Court Justice William J. Brennan, Jr. from 1979 to 1980.

Chertoff worked in private practice with Latham & Watkins from 1980 to 1983 before being hired as a prosecutor by Rudolph Giuliani, then the United States Attorney for the Southern District of New York. Chertoff worked on Mafia and political corruption–related cases. In the mid-1990s, Chertoff returned to Latham & Watkins for a brief period, founding the firm's office in Newark, New Jersey.

In September 1986, together with United States Attorney for the Southern District of New York Rudolph Giuliani, Chertoff was instrumental in the crackdown on organized crime in the Mafia Commission Trial.

In 1990, Chertoff was appointed by President George H. W. Bush as United States Attorney for the District of New Jersey. Among his most important cases, in 1992 Chertoff achieved conviction of second-term Jersey City mayor Gerald McCann on charges of defrauding money from a savings and loan scam. McCann served two years in federal prison.

In 1993, he was a prosecutor in the fraud case against Eddie Antar, founder of the Crazy Eddie electronics store chain.

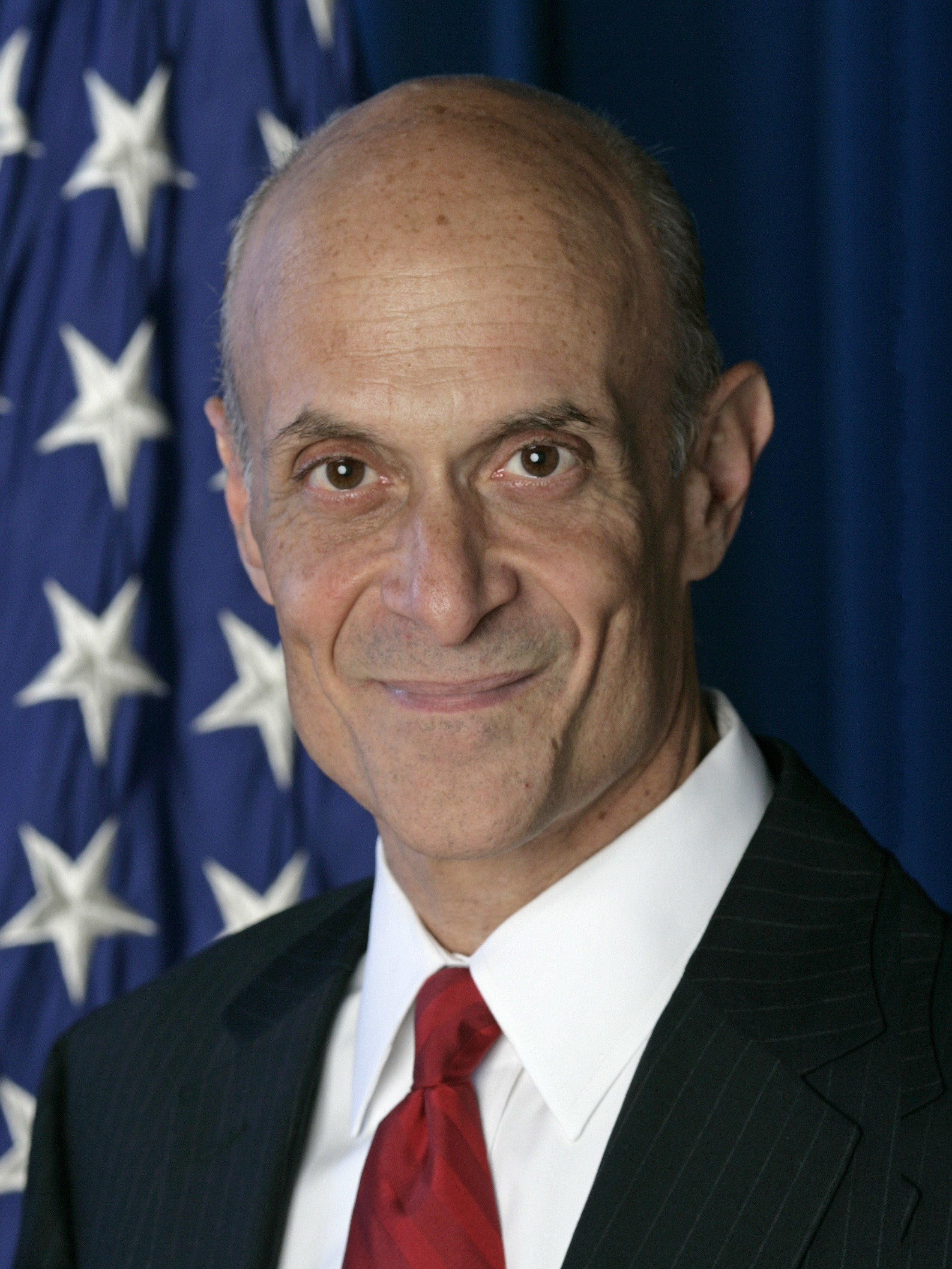
Chertoff's Homeland Security secretary portrait

Chertoff was asked to stay in his position when the Clinton administration took office in 1993, at the request of Democratic Senator Bill Bradley. He was the only United States Attorney who was not replaced due to the change in administrations. He continued to work with the U.S. Attorney's office until 1994, when he entered private practice, returning to Latham & Watkins as a partner.

Despite his friendly relationship with some Democrats, Chertoff was appointed as the special counsel for the Senate Whitewater Committee studying allegations against President Clinton and his wife in what was known as the Whitewater investigation. No charges were brought against the Clintons.

In 2000, Chertoff worked as special counsel to the New Jersey Senate Judiciary Committee, investigating racial profiling in New Jersey. He also did some fundraising for George W. Bush and other Republicans during the 2000 election cycle. He advised Bush's presidential campaign on criminal justice issues.

Chertoff was appointed by Bush to head the criminal division of the Department of Justice, serving from 2001 to 2003. Chertoff was the senior Justice Department official on duty at the F.B.I. command center right after the September 11 attacks. He led the federal prosecution's case against suspected terrorist Zacarias Moussaoui. In 2002 and 2003, Chertoff provided legal advice to the CIA on the use of coercive interrogation methods against terror suspects such as Abu Zubaydah.

Chertoff also led the prosecution's case against accounting firm Arthur Andersen for destroying documents relating to the Enron collapse. The prosecution of Arthur Andersen was controversial, as the firm was effectively dissolved, resulting in the loss of 26,000 jobs. The United States Supreme Court overturned the conviction, and the case has not been retried.

=== Federal judicial service ===
On March 5, 2003, Chertoff was nominated by President Bush to a seat on the United States Court of Appeals for the Third Circuit vacated by Morton I. Greenberg. He was confirmed by the Senate 88–1 on June 9, 2003, with Senator Hillary Clinton of New York casting the lone dissenting vote; he received his commission the following day. Senator Clinton said that she had dissented to register her protest for the way Chertoff's staff mistreated junior White House staffers during the Whitewater investigation. Chertoff served as a federal judge from 2003 to 2005.

=== Secretary of Homeland Security ===
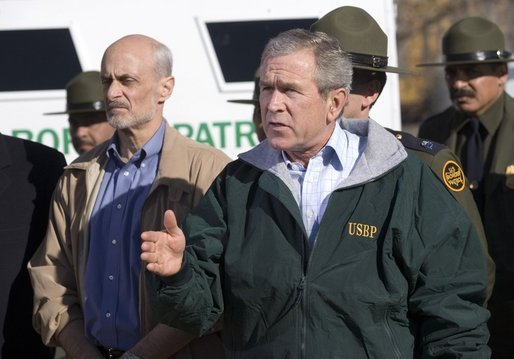
President Bush discussing border security with Chertoff near El Paso, Texas, November 2005

Bush nominated Chertoff as Secretary of Homeland Security in January 2005, citing his experience with post-9/11 terror legislation. He was unanimously approved for the position by the United States Senate on February 15, 2005.

Hurricane Katrina occurred while Chertoff was Secretary of Homeland Security. The department was criticized for its lack of preparation in advance of the well-forecast hurricane; most criticism was directed toward the Federal Emergency Management Agency. DHS in general, and Chertoff in particular, were criticized for responding poorly to the disaster, ignoring crucial information about the catastrophic nature of the storm and devoting little attention to the federal response to what became the most costly disaster in American history.

Chertoff was the Bush administration's point man for pushing the comprehensive immigration reform bill, a measure that stalled in the Senate in June 2007.

Chertoff was asked by the Obama administration to stay in his post until 9 a.m. on January 21, 2009, (one day after President Obama's inauguration) "to ensure a smooth transition".

==== Construction of border fence ====
Under Chertoff's leadership, the Department of Homeland Security constructed hundreds of miles of fencing along the border between the United States and Mexico. Secretary Chertoff exercised his waiver authority on April 1, 2008, to "waive in their entirety" the Endangered Species Act, the Migratory Bird Treaty Act, the National Environmental Policy Act, the Coastal Zone Management Act, the Clean Water Act, the Clean Air Act, and the National Historic Preservation Act to extend triple fencing through the Tijuana River National Estuarine Research Reserve near San Diego. On April 8, 2008, Chertoff issued additional waivers allowing the Department of Homeland Security to "bypass environmental reviews to speed construction of fencing along the Mexican border". The New York Times reported that pursuant to the Secure Fence Act of 2006, "the department was authorized to build up to 700 miles of fencing along the 2,000-mile Southwest border, where most illegal immigrants cross". Congress had granted Chertoff waiver authority in 2005, but the Times described his actions as an expansion of his waiver authority. According to Times columnist Adam Liptak, Chertoff's action excluded the Department of Homeland Security from having to follow laws "protecting the environment, endangered species, migratory birds, the bald eagle, antiquities, farms, deserts, forests, Native American graves and religious freedom." In an editorial, the Times criticized Chertoff for his use of waiver authority, stating: "To the long list of things the Bush administration is willing to trash in its rush to appease immigration hard-liners, you can now add dozens of important environmental laws and hundreds of thousands of acres of fragile habitat on the southern border."

A report issued by the Congressional Research Service, the non-partisan research division of the Library of Congress, said that the unchecked delegation of powers to Chertoff was unprecedented:

After a review of federal law, primarily through electronic database searches and consultations with various CRS experts, we were unable to locate a waiver provision identical to that of §102 of H.R. 418—i.e., a provision that contains 'notwithstanding' language, provides a secretary of an executive agency the authority to waive all laws such secretary determines necessary, and directs the secretary to waive such laws.

On June 23, 2008, the Supreme Court of the United States declined to hear a constitutional challenge to the 2005 law that gave Chertoff waiver authority.

==== Actions regarding illegal immigration ====
In September 2007, Chertoff told a House committee that the DHS would not tolerate interference by sanctuary cities that would block the "Basic Pilot Program", which requires some types of employers to validate the legal status of their workers.

In 2008 it was reported that the residential housekeeping company Chertoff had hired to clean his house employed undocumented immigrants.

=== Post-DHS career ===
Since leaving government service, Chertoff has worked as senior of counsel at the Washington, D.C. law firm of Covington & Burling.

He formed The Chertoff Group (TCG) on February 2, 2009, to work on crisis and risk management.

Chertoff was part of a legal team that represented Russian/Ukrainian Dmitro Firtash against extradition to the United States.

=== Political endorsements ===
In the 2016 presidential election, Chertoff endorsed Hillary Clinton.

In 2024, Chertoff endorsed Jon Bramnick for New Jersey Governor.

== Selected publications ==
- (2009) Homeland Security: Assessing the First Five Years
- (2018) Exploding Data: Reclaiming Our Cyber Security in the Digital Age

== See also ==
- List of Harvard University politicians
- List of Jewish American jurists
- List of law clerks for the third seat of the Supreme Court of the United States
- List of Jewish United States Cabinet members

Legal offices
Preceded by Samuel Alito	United States Attorney for the District of New Jersey; 1990–1994	Succeeded by Faith S. Hochberg
Preceded by Morton Ira Greenberg	Judge of the United States Court of Appeals for the Third Circuit; 2003–2005	Succeeded by Michael Chagares
Political offices
Preceded by Tom Ridge	United States Secretary of Homeland Security; 2005–2009	Succeeded by Janet Napolitano
U.S. order of precedence (ceremonial)
Preceded by Carlos Gutierrez as Former U.S. Cabinet Member	Order of precedence of the United States as Former U.S. Cabinet Member	Succeeded by Henry Paulson as Former U.S. Cabinet Member
