= Nicholas H. Politan =

American judge (1935–2012)

Judge of the United States District Court for the District of New Jersey
- In office November 9, 1987 – January 4, 2002
- Appointed by: Ronald Reagan
- Preceded by: Herbert Jay Stern
- Succeeded by: Freda L. Wolfson

Personal details
- Born: Nicholas H. Politan; November 13, 1935 Newark, New Jersey, U.S.
- Died: February 20, 2012 (aged 76) Atlantis, Florida, U.S.
- Education: Rutgers University (BA, LLB)

Nicholas H. Politan (November 13, 1935 – February 20, 2012) was a United States district judge of the United States District Court for the District of New Jersey.

== Education and career ==
Born in Newark, New Jersey, Politan attended Newark Arts High School. He received an Artium Baccalaureus degree from Rutgers University–Newark in 1957 and a Bachelor of Laws from Rutgers School of Law – Newark in 1960. He was a law clerk for Judge Gerald McLaughlin of the United States Court of Appeals for the Third Circuit from 1960 to 1961. He was in private practice in Lyndhurst, New Jersey from 1961 to 1964, then in Jersey City, New Jersey until 1972, and then in Lyndhurst until 1987. He was a director and chairman of the executive committee of the County Trust Company in Lyndhurst from 1980 to 1987.

== Federal judicial service ==
On August 7, 1987, Politan was nominated by President Ronald Reagan to a seat on the United States District Court for the District of New Jersey vacated by Judge Herbert Jay Stern. Politan was confirmed by the United States Senate on November 6, 1987, and received his commission on November 9, 1987. Politan served in that capacity until his retirement on January 4, 2002.

== Death ==
A longtime resident of West Orange, New Jersey, Politan died on February 20, 2012, in Atlantis, Florida.

== Sources ==
Legal offices
Preceded by Herbert Jay Stern	Judge of the United States District Court for the District of New Jersey; 1987–2002	Succeeded by Freda L. Wolfson
