= Judgment in Berlin (film) =

1988 American drama film

- Theatrical release poster
- Directed by: Leo Penn
- Written by: Joshua Sinclair; Leo Penn
- Produced by: Joshua Sinclair; Ingrid Windisch
- Starring: Martin Sheen; Sam Wanamaker; Max Gail; Harris Yulin; Sean Penn
- Edited by: Teddy Darvas
- Distributed by: New Line Cinema
- Release date: May 6, 1988
- Running time: 96 minutes
- Countries: United States; West Germany
- Language: English
- Box office: $229,556

Judgment in Berlin is a 1988 American drama film directed and written by Leo Penn, produced by Joshua Sinclair, who also co-wrote the film and acted in it, and Ingrid Windisch, and starring Martin Sheen, Sam Wanamaker, and Sean Penn, the director's son. It is based on the book Judgment in Berlin by Herbert J. Stern.

It was shot at the Tempelhof Studios in Berlin and on location around the city.

== Synopsis ==
Based on the Cold War true story of three East Berlin men who hijacked a plane to escape to the West. After being caught, they stand trial in Germany, where an American judge must decide if the political circumstances and economic hardships of life in the German Democratic Republic justified the hijacking of a plane into West Berlin.

== Cast ==
Listed in credits order:

- Martin Sheen as Herbert J. Stern: US federal judge
- Sam Wanamaker as Bernard Hellring: defence attorney
- Max Gail as Judah Best: defence attorney
- Jurgen Heinrich as Uri Andreyev: Soviet official
- Heinz Hoenig as Helmut Thiele: hijacker
- Carl Lumbly as Edwin Palmer: US State Dept prosecutor
- Max Volkert Martens as Hans Schuster: electrical engineer
- Cristine Rose as Marsha Stern: wife of Herbert
- Marie-Louise Sinclair as Kim Becker: West German legal counsel
- Joshua Sinclair as Alan Sherman: US State Dept prosecutor
- Jutta Speidel as Sigrid Radke: waitress
- Harris Yulin as Bruno Ristau: US Dept. of Justice official
- Sean Penn as Guenther X: refugee
- Burt Nelson as Patrick J. Heller: Colonel USAF
- Malgorzata Gebel as Beata Levandovska: flight attendant (as Malgoscha Gebel)
- Ed Bishop as Dyson Wilde: US State Dept. official

== See also ==
- Judgment in Berlin, 1984 book on which the film is based
