= William H. Walls =

American judge (1932–2019)

Senior Judge of the United States District Court for the District of New Jersey
- In office January 31, 2005 – July 11, 2019

Judge of the United States District Court for the District of New Jersey
- In office October 11, 1994 – January 31, 2005
- Appointed by: Bill Clinton
- Preceded by: Harold A. Ackerman
- Succeeded by: Renée Marie Bumb

Judge of the New Jersey Superior Court
- In office 1979–1994

Personal details
- Born: November 28, 1932 Atlantic City, New Jersey, U.S.
- Died: July 11, 2019 (aged 86)
- Education: Dartmouth College (A.B.); Yale Law School (LL.B.)

William Hamilton Walls (November 28, 1932 – July 11, 2019) was a United States district judge of the United States District Court for the District of New Jersey.

== Education and career ==
Born in Atlantic City, New Jersey, Walls received an Artium Baccalaureus degree from Dartmouth College in 1954 and a Bachelor of Laws from Yale Law School in 1957. He was a law clerk from 1957 to 1959. He was in private practice in Newark, New Jersey, from 1959 to 1962, and was an assistant corporation counsel for Newark from 1962 to 1968. He was a judge on the Newark Municipal Court from 1968 to 1970, and was a corporation counsel for Newark from 1970 to 1973. He was in private practice in Newark from 1972 to 1975, and was a business administrator for the City of Newark from 1974 to 1977. He was a judge on the Essex County Court from 1977 to 1978, and on the New Jersey Superior Court from 1979 to 1994.

== Federal judicial service ==
On September 14, 1994, Walls was nominated by President Bill Clinton to a seat on the United States District Court for the District of New Jersey vacated by Harold A. Ackerman. Walls was confirmed by the United States Senate on October 7, 1994, and received his commission on October 11, 1994. He assumed senior status on January 31, 2005.

In 2017, Walls, who has a reputation for severe sentencing in political corruption cases, presided over the trial (which ended with a hung jury and mistrial) of US Senator Bob Menendez. The Justice Department declined to pursue the charges in a new trial.

== See also ==
- List of African-American federal judges
- List of African-American jurists

Legal offices
Preceded by Harold A. Ackerman	Judge of the United States District Court for the District of New Jersey; 1994–2005	Succeeded by Renée Marie Bumb
