= Herbert Jay Stern =

American judge (born 1936)

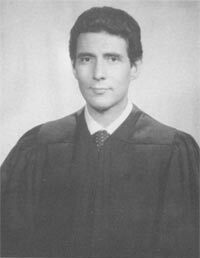

Judge of the United States Court for Berlin
- In office 1979

Judge of the United States District Court for the District of New Jersey
- In office December 28, 1973 – January 4, 1987
- Appointed by: Richard Nixon
- Preceded by: Leonard I. Garth
- Succeeded by: Nicholas H. Politan

United States Attorney for the District of New Jersey
- In office 1971–1973
- President: Richard Nixon
- Preceded by: Frederick B. Lacey
- Succeeded by: Jonathan L. Goldstein

Personal details
- Born: Herbert Jay Stern; November 8, 1936 (age 89) New York, New York, U.S.
- Education: Hobart College (BA); University of Chicago (JD)

Herbert Jay Stern (born November 8, 1936) is a trial lawyer, with a national practice in civil and criminal litigation, as well as mediation and arbitration. Earlier in his career, Stern served as a United States district judge of the United States District Court for the District of New Jersey and as the United States Judge for Berlin.

He presided over a hijacking trial that was the only case ever tried in an American court in the occupied American Sector of West Berlin.

He was part of the team that successfully handled several major corruption and organized crime trials in New Jersey.

== Early life and education ==
Born on November 8, 1936, in New York, New York, He attended Hobart College. After graduating with honors in 1958 with a Bachelor of Arts degree, he was also awarded The Ford Foundation National Honor Scholarship for three years and went on to earn a J.D. degree from the University of Chicago Law School in 1961. He was admitted to the New York bar in 1961 and the New Jersey bar in 1971.

== District Attorney and United States Attorney ==
Stern served from 1962 to 1965 as an assistant district attorney, New York County, assigned to the Homicide Bureau, which conducted the grand jury investigation of the assassination of Malcolm X.

In January 1966, he was appointed Special Attorney in the Organized Crime and Racketeering Section of the United States Department of Justice in the state of New Jersey. Stern conducted a Special Grand Jury and uncovered corruption and other wrongdoing both in municipal government, including the then Mayor of Woodbridge Township, New Jersey, and the trade union movement. (United States v. Colonial Pipeline Co. et. United States v. Peter Weber) through 1969. In December 1970, Stern became the Acting United States Attorney for New Jersey. From 1971 to 1973, he served as the United States Attorney for the District of New Jersey, pursuant to the appointment of the President of the United States. He personally conducted/supervised several major corruption and organized crime trials in New Jersey, including the Mayors of Newark, Jersey City and Atlantic City; two successive State Treasurers and Secretaries of State of New Jersey, as well as U.S. Congressman Cornelius E. Gallagher.

== Federal judicial service ==
Stern was nominated by President Richard Nixon on December 7, 1973, to the seat on the United States District Court for the District of New Jersey vacated by Judge Leonard I. Garth. He was confirmed by the United States Senate on December 19, 1973, and received his commission on December 28, 1973. His service terminated on January 4, 1987, due to his resignation.

=== Service with the Court for Berlin ===
During his thirteen-year tenure on the bench, Stern presided over a variety of civil and criminal cases. However, his judicial service is best remembered for the unique case of United States v. Tiede, an aircraft hijacking prosecution that was the sole case ever tried in the United States Court for Berlin, over which he was specially designated to preside by the Secretary of State. In a published opinion, United States v. Tiede, 86 F.R.D. 227 (D. Berlin 1979), Stern held that––even though the case involved prosecution of German citizens in an unusual forum outside the United States––the defendants were still parties to an American criminal proceeding and entitled to the United States Constitution's guarantee of trial by jury. Stern later authored Judgment in Berlin, a book about his experiences in the Tiede case which was made into a motion picture starring Sean Penn and Martin Sheen, who portrayed Stern.

== Post-judicial career ==
After his resignation from the federal bench, Stern entered private practice as an attorney. He is the founding partner of his own law firm Stern, Kilcullen & Rufolo, LLC. located in Florham Park, New Jersey.

Judge Stern has been the recipient of numerous honors and other positions

- Honorary Doctor of Law, Seton Hall Law School, 1973
- Honorary Doctor of Humane Letters, Newark State College, 1973
- Honorary Doctor of Letters, Montclair State College, 1973
- Honorary Doctor of Civil Law, Bloomfield College, 1973
- Honorary Doctor of Laws, Hobart College, 1974
- Deans Award for Exceptional Public Service, Akron University School of Law, 1986
- Co-director and Founder, Advocacy Institute, University of Virginia School of Law, 1980 to 2002.
- Adjunct Professor, Rutgers and Seton Hall Law Schools.
- Schwartzer Fellow, University of Chicago Law School, 1985
- Advisory Committee, University of Chicago Law School, 1974–1977
- Special Counsel to the Independent Counsel in the Iran-Contra Affair, February 1988 (United States v. Oliver North, et al.)
- Honorary Trustee, Hobart and William Smith Colleges
- Appointed Federal Monitor, by the U.S. Department of Justice, of the University of Medicine and Dentistry of New Jersey.
- Lead Donor of Stern Hall, Hobart College

Judge Stern has received numerous civic awards, among which are:

- Recipient of the Torch of Learning Award of the American Friends of the Hebrew University, April 28, 1987
- Recipient of the Freedom Foundation at Valley Forge George Washington Honor Medal for Excellence in the category of books for 1984
- Recipient of International Platform Association's Clarence Darrow Award, 1985
- First President, Association of the Federal Bar of New Jersey
- Recipient of William J. Brennan, Jr. Award, University of Virginia School of Law
- Recipient of the William J. Brennan, Jr. Award presented by The Association of the Federal Bar of the State of New Jersey, June 11, 1987
- Recipient of Citizen's Award from the New Jersey Academy of Medicine, 1997.
- Recipient of one of America's Ten Outstanding Young Men, The United States Jaycees, 1973.

Judge Stern has written numerous articles, treatises and books including:

- Subject of the book, Tiger in the Court, by Paul Hoffman, Playboy Press, 1973
- Author, Judgment in Berlin, Universe Books, 1984; 2nd edition, Skyhorse Publishing, 2021
- Author, Trying Cases To Win, a 5 volume work on trial practice, Wiley Law Publications,1991, 1992, 1993, 1995 and 1999; Co author, Trying Cases to Win: Evidence Weapons for Winning. Aspen Publishers, 2000, 2003, 2004
- Author, Diary of a DA, Skyhorse Publishing, 2012
- Author, Trying Cases to Win: In One Volume, ABA Publishing, 2013
- Co-author of two-volume novels: Wolf, Skyhorse Publishing, 2020
- Sins of the Fathers, Skyhorse Publishing, 2022
- Author, Trying Cases to Win: In One Volume. Student Edition, West Academic, 2020

Judge Stern has served in numerous arbitrations under the American Arbitration Association, the International Court in Paris, private mediations, the Arbitration Institute of the Stockholm Chamber of Commerce, and the London Court of International Arbitration (LCIA). Sampling is as follows:

- Party Arbitrator in a dispute between PepsiCo and OCAAT concerning all of Pepsi's bottling in Venezuela which was taken by Coca Cola
- Arbitrator in dispute between Roche Holdings and K.V. Pharmaceuticals
- Arbitrator in dispute between Bechtel International, Inc. and Cliffs and Associates Limited
- Arbitrator in dispute between Raytheon and Pilatus Aircraft
- Arbitrator in dispute between Allied Signal and Breed Technologies, Inc.
- Mediator in dispute between Union Carbide, Shell Oil and Montediso
- Arbitrator in dispute between Tyco Submarine Systems and Atlantic Crossings, Ltd.
- Arbitrator in dispute between Honeywell International, Inc. and Isola Laminate Systems, Corp.
- Arbitrator in dispute between Messier v. Viivendi Universal, et al.
- Arbitrator in dispute between Damon Mezzacappa and Lazard, LLC, et als.
- Arbitrator in dispute between Sears and MorganStanley
- Arbitrator in dispute between Avanti Launch Services Limited and Space Exploration Technologies Corp.
- Arbitration in dispute between HS Orka hf. and Noroural Grundartangi ehf. et al.
- Arbitration in dispute between Wendy's International LLC and Mawarid Food Company Ltd; and Mawarid Holding Company Limited

== See also ==
- List of Jewish American jurists

== Sources ==
- Narvaez, Alphonso A., "Judge's Years with U.S.: From Malcolm X to Berlin", The New York Times, Nov. 9, 1986.

== Publications ==
- Herbert J. Stern, Prosecution of Local Political Corruption Under the Hobbs Act: The Unnecessary Distinction Between Bribery and Extortion, 3 Seton Hall L. Rev. 1 (1971).
- Stern, Herbert Jay, Judgment in Berlin, New York: Universe Books, 1984.

Legal offices
Preceded by Frederick B. Lacey	United States Attorney for the District of New Jersey; 1971–1973	Succeeded by Jonathan L. Goldstein
Preceded by Leonard I. Garth	Judge of the United States District Court for the District of New Jersey; 1973–1987	Succeeded by Nicholas H. Politan
