= Morton Ira Greenberg =

American judge (1933–2021)

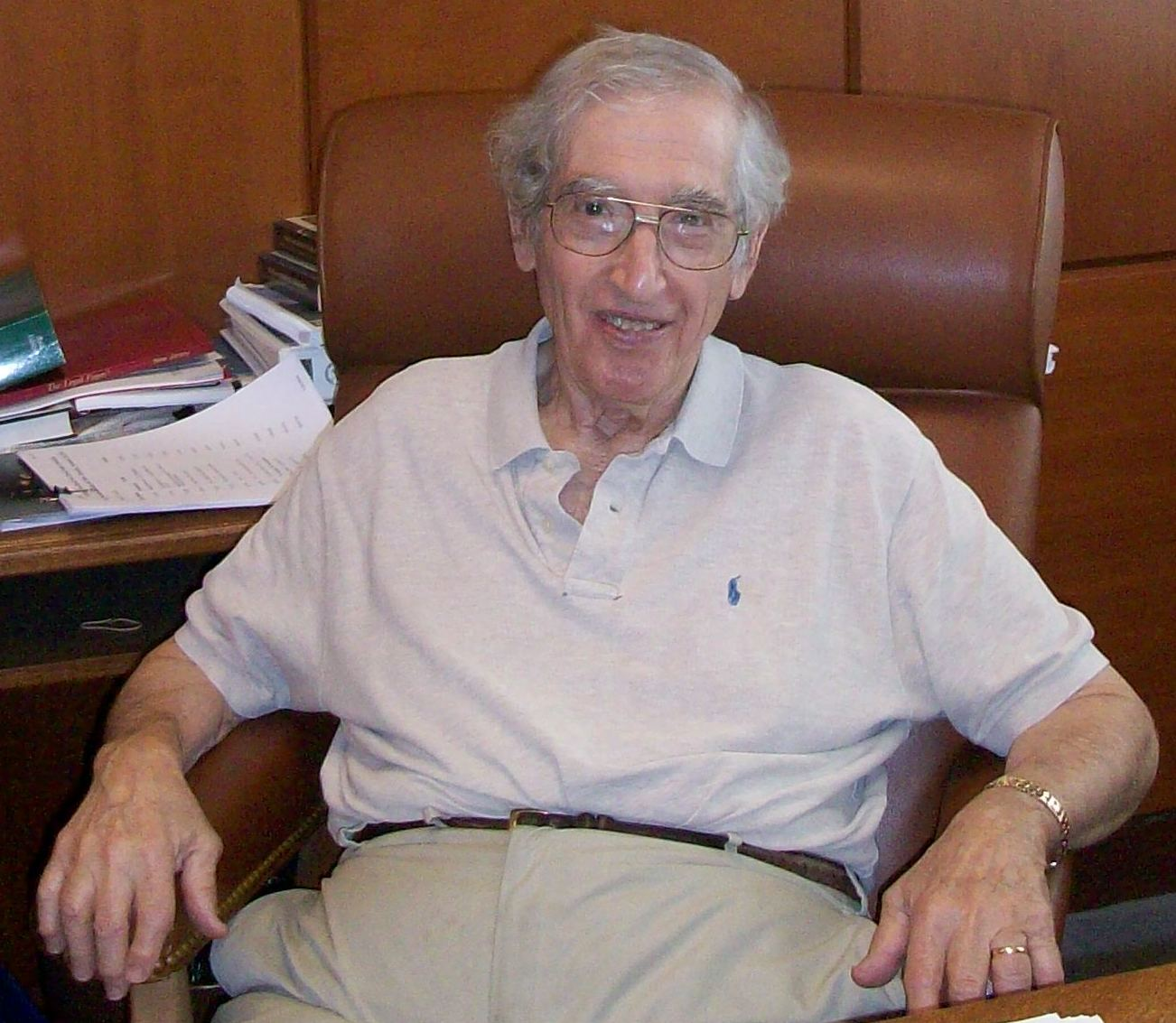
- Judge Morton I Greenberg, Third Circuit

Senior Judge of the United States Court of Appeals for the Third Circuit
- In office June 30, 2000 – January 28, 2021

Judge of the United States Court of Appeals for the Third Circuit
- In office March 23, 1987 – June 30, 2000
- Appointed by: Ronald Reagan
- Preceded by: Leonard I. Garth
- Succeeded by: Michael Chertoff

Personal details
- Born: March 20, 1933 Philadelphia, Pennsylvania, U.S.
- Died: January 28, 2021 (aged 87) Princeton, New Jersey, U.S.
- Education: University of Pennsylvania (BA); Yale University (LLB)

Morton Ira Greenberg (March 20, 1933 – January 28, 2021) was a United States circuit judge of the United States Court of Appeals for the Third Circuit. He was nominated by President Ronald Reagan on February 11, 1987 and was confirmed by the United States Senate on March 20, 1987. He assumed senior status on June 30, 2000.

== Education and career ==
Greenberg was born in Philadelphia, in 1933 but moved to Atlantic City, New Jersey, at a young age. Greenberg was Jewish. After graduating high school, he attended the University of Pennsylvania, where he received a Bachelor of Arts degree in 1954. He then attended Yale Law School, where he received a Bachelor of Laws in 1957. At Yale, he was a member of the Yale Law Journal.

After leaving Yale, he moved to Trenton, New Jersey, and began working in the Office of the New Jersey Attorney General during the administration of Democratic Governor Robert B. Meyner, where he remained until 1960. In 1960, he left the Attorney General's Office and entered private practice in Cape May, New Jersey. From 1970 to 1971, he was the County Attorney for Cape May County, New Jersey. In 1971, he returned to the Attorney General's Office as the Assistant Attorney General for the State of New Jersey. In 1973, he was appointed a judge of the Superior Court of New Jersey. He served in the trial divisions—first in the law division then in the chancery division—until 1980, when he was appointed a judge in the New Jersey Appellate Division.

=== Federal judicial service ===
Greenberg was nominated by President Ronald Reagan to fill a seat on the United States Court of Appeals for the Third Circuit vacated by Judge Leonard I. Garth on February 11, 1987, and was confirmed by the United States Senate on March 20, 1987. He received his commission on March 23, 1987, and assumed senior status on June 30, 2000.

=== Notable decisions ===
==== Kreimer v. Morristown ====
Richard R. Kreimer, a homeless man residing in various public places throughout Morristown, New Jersey, filed a pro se complaint in the District Court of New Jersey, claiming that his expulsion from the Joint Free Public Library of Morristown and Morris Township was unconstitutional, as it violated his First and Fourteenth Amendment rights. The district court accepted Kreimer’s arguments, holding that the library’s rules and regulations (especially those requiring proper hygiene) violated the First Amendment as they were unconstitutionally overbroad and unconstitutionally vague. The library’s policies violated the Fourteenth Amendment by making unconstitutional distinctions between patrons (i.e. against homeless persons).

In an opinion delivered by Greenberg, the Third Circuit reversed, finding that libraries are "limited public fora." Given that the library would not have been open without the consent of a majority of voters, the municipality had an interest in assuring the library would be used for its intended purpose; "the communication of the written word." Libraries, by nature, are meant to be places of quiet thoughtful writing, reading or contemplation, and policies designed to protect the intended uses of libraries do not violate the constitution. Any patron who disrupted others and prevented them from using a library to the fullest extent through their actions or inactions (e.g. inability to maintain public hygiene standards) could be subject to expulsion.

==== Dissent in LePage's v. 3M ====
LePage's sued 3M for anti-trust violations in a case involving 3M's product scotch tape, which 3M had a monopoly over. LePage's asserted that 3M was "bundling" its products together in order to maintain its advantage in the tape market. LePage's won a jury verdict, and 3M appealed to the Third Circuit Court of Appeals. The court heard the case en banc, with Judge Dolores Sloviter writing the opinion affirming the verdict for LePage's. Judge Greenberg dissented from the full Court's opinion. He argued that companies should be able to give rebates to volume purchasers and that the majority was simply punishing 3M for being more efficient than LePage's. He was joined in his dissent by Chief Judge Anthony Joseph Scirica and later Supreme Court Justice, Samuel Alito.

==== ACLU v. Mukasey ====
In 1998, a federal district court issued a preliminary injunction forbidding the U.S. government from implementing the new Child Online Protection Act. The U.S. Supreme Court eventually upheld this injunction on appeal. This preliminary injunction, however, only lasted until a full trial could be held. In 2007, the full trial was completed, and the district court ruled the law unconstitutional. The government appealed the decision to the Court of Appeals for the Third Circuit. The Third Circuit, in an opinion written by Judge Greenberg, held that the law was not "narrowly tailored" to achieve its purpose of protecting children from pornography. For example, web publishers would have to incur "high costs" in order to avoid prosecution, even when web publishers only served adults. The Supreme Court refused to hear an appeal from Judge Greenberg's ruling, making his decision the last word as to the constitutionality of the law.

== See also ==
- List of Jewish American jurists

== Sources ==
Legal offices
Preceded by Leonard I. Garth	Judge of the United States Court of Appeals for the Third Circuit; 1987–2000	Succeeded by Michael Chertoff
