= James Rosen (jurist) =

American judge (1909–1972)

Judge of the United States Court of Appeals for the Third Circuit
- In office September 22, 1971 – November 18, 1972
- Appointed by: Richard Nixon
- Preceded by: William H. Hastie
- Succeeded by: Leonard I. Garth

Personal details
- Born: James Rosen; October 23, 1909 Brooklyn, New York, U.S.
- Died: November 18, 1972 (aged 63) West New York, New Jersey, U.S.
- Education: Rutgers Law School (LLB)

James Rosen (October 23, 1909 – November 18, 1972) was a United States circuit judge of the United States Court of Appeals for the Third Circuit.

== Education and career ==
Born in Brooklyn, New York, Rosen received a Bachelor of Laws from Newark Law School (now Rutgers Law School) in 1930. He was in private practice in Union City, New Jersey from 1931 to 1959. He was a judge of Hudson County, New Jersey from 1959 to 1964, and then on the New Jersey Superior Court from 1964 to 1971.

== Federal judicial service ==
On July 19, 1971, Rosen was nominated by President Richard Nixon to a seat on the United States Court of Appeals for the Third Circuit vacated by Judge William H. Hastie. He was confirmed by the United States Senate on September 21, 1971, and received his commission on September 22, 1971. Rosen served in that capacity until his death on November 18, 1972, in West New York, New Jersey.

== Sources ==
Legal offices
Preceded by William H. Hastie	Judge of the United States Court of Appeals for the Third Circuit; 1971–1972	Succeeded by Leonard I. Garth
