= United States Court for Berlin =

U.S. court, 1965–1990

The United States Court for Berlin was a United States Article II court that had jurisdiction over American-occupied Berlin. It was in existence from 1955 until the Two plus Four Treaty in 1990.

The United States High Commissioner for Germany (Note: created by Executive Order 10062 of 6 June 1949 pursuant to the Foreign Service Act of 1946) functioned until the abolition of the Allied High Commission on 5 May 1955 pursuant to the Bonn–Paris conventions. (Note: However, the conventions did not deal with the status of Berlin, in which the Allied Kommandatura continued to exercise supreme authority until 1991.) On 28 April 1955, only a few days before the occupation regime terminated in the rest of Germany, the High Commissioner promulgated Law No. 46 establishing the United States Court for Berlin.

The Court was only convened once, in 1979, to hear the jury trial of the LOT Flight 165 hijacking defendants. The case (U.S. v. Tiede) was notable in holding that the reach of the United States Constitution was a legal rather than a political question, citing jurisprudence dating back to Ex parte Milligan, where the United States Supreme Court had declared, "The Constitution of the United States is a law for rulers and people, equally in war and in peace, and covers with the shield of its protection all classes of men, at all times, and under all circumstances."

During his appointment, Judge Herbert Jay Stern was subjected to intense diplomatic pressure, which he alluded to when he sentenced Tiede to time served, and noted that there was "probably not a great future" for the Court. This was confirmed at the end of the criminal trial, when a group of West Germans filed a civil suit with it alleging that a US military housing development violated a German zoning law. Walter J. Stoessel Jr. (at that time the United States Ambassador to West Germany) advised Stern that his appointment was only for the criminal case that had been heard, and it was accordingly terminated. The claimants later attempted to bring its suit in the United States District Court for the District of Columbia, where it was dismissed.

Stern wrote a book about his experience that was published in 1984. The book, Judgment in Berlin, was adapted into a movie of the same name four years later.

== Bibliography ==
- McCauliff, C.M.A. (1980). "Reach of the Constitution: American Peace-Time Court in West Berlin". Notre Dame Law Review. 55 (5): 682–707.
- Fullerton, Maryellen (1986). "Hijacking Trials Overseas: The Need for an Article III Court". William & Mary Law Review. 28 (1): 1–87.
