= Franco Angeli =

Italian artist (1935–1988)

- Born: Giuseppe Franco Angeli; 14 May 1935; San Lorenzo, Rome, Kingdom of Italy
- Died: 12 November 1988 (aged 53); Rome, Italy
- Occupation: Artist
- Known for: Paintings

Giuseppe Franco Angeli (14 May 1935 – 12 November 1988) was an Italian artist.

== Early life ==
Giuseppe Franco Angeli, the son of Erminia Angeli and Gennaro Gennarini, was born in Via dei Piceni in the Quartiere San Lorenzo district of Rome on 14 May 1935. Like his brothers Omero and Otello, he took his mother's surname. At the age of nine, following his father's death, Angeli began working as a storeroom boy. He also worked in a car body repair shop and was an upholsterer for a time. All these aspects of his early life affected his art career and style. Later in life, his style included the use of fabrics, templates, and scraps of cloth reminiscent of his past upholstery work.

== Art ==
From 1955 to 1957, Angeli was a self-taught artist. Though Angeli had never taken formal art classes, he began painting in 1957 during military service in Orvieto. He justified his position by stating that "when you feel a deep malaise, you must look for a way not to be lonely. In short, you need to end an interest that will accompany you in life."

=== Influences ===
While stationed in Rome, Angeli met a sculptor named Edgardo Mannucci. Mannucci had connections with a painter called Alberto Burri and Angeli found the painter's work fascinating. He adapted Burri's techniques in his own work, eventually borrowing the worn-out materiality of the Catrami (Tars). In fact, the overall aesthetic of broken or ruined things became a key aspect of his work. Significantly, the aesthetic appeared in the subject of his painting E da una ferita scaturì la bellezza (Out of a Wound, Beauty Pours Forth; 1957), a work based on his memories of the bombing of San Lorenzo on 19 July 1943. In his opinion, "matter for me is a fragment of this huge wound that devastated Europe; my first paintings were like that—like a wound from which I removed pieces of a bandage." From this inherently political groundwork, Angeli's art found its own political charge. His membership in the Italian Communist Party left marks in his initial approaches to painting. These marks faded after he departed the party and drew closer to the more radical leftist and Maoist movements.

=== First steps ===
In March 1959, in a joint exhibition at the Galleria La Salita with Tano Festa and Giuseppe Uncini, Angeli exhibited his works for the first time. The magazine Azimuth, founded by Piero Manzoni and Enrico Castellani, featured him alongside Agostino Bonalumi, Jasper Johns, Yves Klein, Robert Rauschenberg, and Mimmo Rotella. In January 1960, the Galleria La Salita gave him his first solo exhibit. His featured works consisted of veils of oil paints and nylon stockings stretched tight and covered with gauze. A critic called Cesare Vivaldi described the effects of those evoked memories and absences as the "tears of things". In 1960, Angeli took part in a collective show, again at the Galleria La Salita, entitled 5 pittori. Roma 60 (5 Painters. Rome 60). The artists were Angeli, Festa, Lo Savio, Schifano, Uncini; the show was curated by Pierre Restany.

=== Artistic evolution ===
In 1962, Angeli took part in "New Perspectives of Italian Painting", an exhibition at the Galleria Comunale d'Arte Moderna in Bologna. Angeli showed a series of works with symbols of power—initially swastikas, crosses, and half-moons. For instance, the series entitled Cimiteri (Cemeteries) from the early 1960s used sequences of white crosses, which recall the power of Mauri's Schermi (Screens) and the Achrome (Achromes) by Manzoni, with whom he was in close contact. As time went on, Angeli began to portray fragments of history and recorded traces of contemporary events. One work, called O.A.S. (1961), alluded to the illegal paramilitary French organization during the Algerian war. Another work, Cuba (1960), drew from the United States embargo shortly after Fidel Castro's revolutionary forces had overthrown Batista's dictatorship. Further, 25 Luglio (1963), which means 25 July, commemorates the fall of Italy's fascist regime in 1943.

In February 1963, Angeli showed his works along with a poem by Nanni Balestrini in an art exhibition of 13 pittori a Roma ("13 painters"), in the Galleria La Tartaruga. In May of the same year, he presented at the Galerie J in Paris with Christo, Conner, Kudo, Todd, and Mauri in an exhibition curated by Restany - L'Object Pressenti. Shortly afterward in June, he held a solo show at the Galleria La Tartaruga with a series of works focusing on the value of the symbol to acquire a different dimension. This allowed him to go beyond the legacy of Arte informale. In 1963, he collaborated with Mario Diacono and Elio Pagliarani to produce limited editions of books with handwritten texts and original drawings. For a solo show at the Galleria dell'Ariete, Milan in January 1964, Angeli resorted to stereotypical ideological urban symbols emblematic of the rhetorical, celebratory character of Rome's archaeological ends. These works became the "Capitoline Fragments", which he presented in a Roman exhibition at the Studio d'arte Arco d'Alibert in October 1964. In March, he featured in a show with Umberto Bignardi, Festa, Giosetta Fioroni, Jannis Kounellis, Sergio Lombardo, Renato Mambor, and Cesare Tacchi at the Galleria La Tartaruga. In June, he showed his work for the first time at the Venice Biennale (32nd International Art Exhibition). In the two works he selected for that show, La Lupa (She-Wolf) and Quarter Dollar, his use of the veil obscured the significance of the underlying symbol. Those two paintings faded from the public's memory with little impact.

In April 1965, Galleria Odyssia, Rome presented an exhibition called "A Generation", which featured Angeli as a prominent artist. In the autumn he had two simultaneous solo shows—one at the Galerie J, Paris, and the other at Galleria Zero, Verona—and also presented at the 10th National Art Quadrennial in Rome and in L'art actuel en Italie: semaines italiennes at the Municipal Casino, Cannes. He produced a series of dazibaos: Compagni, Berlino 1945 (Comrades, Berlin, 1945), Compagno vietnamita (Vietnamese Comrade), Occupazione di un monumento equestre (Occupation of an Equestrian Monument), and Abbraccio eterno (Eternal Embrace). These works caused the critic Dario Micacchi to describe Angeli's painting approach as "seeing and making reality be seen politically".

Angeli's 1966 solo show Half Dollar at the Studio d'arte Arco d'Alibert exemplified his views on coins, which he saw as "the small symbolic world that he had been seeking for years. He had previously thought he had found this in bags, coats of arms and stone inscriptions." In October, the exhibition America America (Half Dollar) opened at the Galleria dell'Ariete with veiled, gilded eagles in hues of blue, white and red. The same title appeared in a solo show at the Studio d'arte Arco d'Alibert in March (1967). In April of that year, he took part in the collective show of eight Roman painters at the Galleria De Foscherari, Bologna, and in June he attended as one of "Eleven Italian Artists from the 1960s" in an exhibition at the Spoleto Festival of Two Worlds, where he met Marina Ripa di Meana, with whom he had a long love affair.

=== Film ===
In September, he took part in the 9th São Paulo Art Biennial and made his first film, Giornate di lettura (Reading Days), followed by a long period in which he combined video, photography, and the visual arts. This approach appears in films such as Schermi (Screens; 1968), New York (1969), Viva il Primo Maggio (Hurrah for the First of May; 1968), and Souvenir (1984).

In 1966, Sandro Franchina shot a film entitled Morire gratis (Die for Free), which told the story of how Angeli's sculpture, the Lupa capitolina (Capitoline She-Wolf), traveled by car from Rome to Paris. In March 1968, in a solo exhibition at the Galleria La Tartaruga, Angeli showed a series of works with metal inserts, grids, arrows, and three-dimensional panels that prefigured the lowered ceiling of the installation, Opprimente (Oppressive), that the Galleria La Tartaruga created for "The Theatre of Exhibitions", a landmark event involving a host of artists such as Fioroni, Emilio Prini and Paolo Icaro, Pier Paolo Calzolari, Castellani, Paolo Scheggi, Mario Ceroli, Mambor, Tacchi, Alighiero Boetti, and Mauri.

=== Other works ===
In 1968, Angeli's preoccupation with the Vietnam war and the student protests caused him to produce works such as Università Americana (American University; 1967) and Corteo (Protest March; 1968), which he created using the technique of social reportage.

In January 1969, he made his first trip to the United States. He arrived ahead of the collective exhibition entitled Italian Art Show: Franco Angeli, Cesare Tacchi, Tano Festa and Lorri Whiting, which was installed in the Contemporary Arts Gallery of the Loeb Student Center in New York throughout October and November. Two other exhibitions in Italy, a solo show at the Galleria dell'Ariete in January and Anno '60 (The Year 1960) at the Galleria Christian Stein in April, drew him back to his homeland.

In the early 1970s, Angeli continued to focus on realistic political events. He produced a series of landscapes, including Canto popolare delle Ande (Andean Folk Song), a geometrically inspired work dedicated to the coup in Chile on 11 September 1973. He returned to the Vietnam war in Anonimo Euroasiatico (Anonymous Eurasian; 1969) and Compagni (Giap e Ho Chi Minh) (Comrades [Giap and Ho Chi Minh]; 1971), while he also addressed the military coup in Greece.

In 1975, he met Livia Lancellotti, his life partner. The two of them had a daughter, Maria, in 1976. In the late 1970s and early 1980s, some "childishly joyful toy airplanes, bearing death in Vietnam" began to appear in his landscapes. His works started to recall the bombings of the Second World War.

== Later life ==
Angeli's deep interest in social and popular culture issues continued in his works throughout the 1980s, when he returned to the theme of war in a series of exotic landscapes with pyramids, obelisks, and airplanes that eventually became Esplosioni (Explosions; 1986). The stylized forms had spires, capitals, and deserted squares as if in "a grandiose, excruciating sense of excavation in which history and life resurface as perfect, intact geometric solids radiating fresh, fragrant pure colors—green, blue, and red." The theme of "puppets", which he developed in 1984, became a kind of self-portrait that foreshadowed the last stage of his life.

Franco Angeli died in Rome of an AIDS-related illness on 12 November 1988. The manner in which he died was subsequently examined by police as part of a wider investigation into heroin trafficking, following the deaths of several members of Rome's cultural elite in similar circumstances.
