= Silkworm (disambiguation) =

The silkworm (Bombyx mori) is the larva or caterpillar of a moth that is very important economically as the producer of silk.

Silkworm or The Silkworm may also refer to:

- Silkworm (missile), a Chinese-built anti-ship cruise missile
- Silkworm (band), an indie rock band
- Silk Worm, a 1988 video game
- SilkWorm, a channel network switch made of fibre produced by Brocade Communications Systems
- The Silkworm (film), a 1973 Italian thriller film directed by Mario Sequi
- The Silkworm, a 2014 mystery novel written by J. K. Rowling under the pen-name "Robert Galbraith"
