= Crime After School =

Crime After School may refer to:

- Crime After School (1959 film), a West German drama film
- Crime After School (1975 film), a West German-Hungarian crime drama film
