= Evelyne Kraft =

Swiss actress (1951–2009)

- Kraft as Samantha Ah Wei in The Mighty Peking Man (1977)
- Born: 22 September 1951; Zürich, Zürich District, Canton of Zürich, Switzerland
- Died: 13 January 2009 (aged 57); Islisberg, Canton of Aargau, Switzerland
- Other names: Evelyne Elgar
- Occupations: businesswoman, former actress
- Years active: 1972–1981
- Children: 3

Evelyne Kraft (22 September 1951 – 13 January 2009) was a Swiss businesswoman and former actress. She was best known for her roles in the films Lady Dracula and The Mighty Peking Man.

== Background ==
Born in Zürich, Switzerland on 22 September 1951, Kraft made her acting debut in 1972 as Evelyne Elgar alongside Anita Ekberg in the Italian horror film Casa d'appuntamento. This was followed by the role of a mechanic, Jacqueline, in Rudolf Zehetgruber's 1973 German comedy film Ein Käfer auf Extratour (1973) and other roles in Die Fabrikanten, The Maddest Car in the World, Crime After School, and The Fifth Commandment. Kraft also acted in the TV series Ein Fall für Männdli episode Die Verrückte. She gained fame for the portrayal of the title heroine in Franz Josef Gottlieb's 1977 West German film Lady Dracula.

She starred in two Hong Kong Shaw Brothers films, Deadly Angels and The Mighty Peking Man, both in 1977. Kraft played her last role in the 1981 Soviet-French-Swiss co-production Teheran 43 as Jill the false secretary, before retiring from acting.

She later married the heir to a real estate company and had three children. In 1995, she presided over her husband's construction timber company, with business and charity interests based in Nigeria. She also dedicated herself to animal welfare and global poverty concerns.

She died due to sudden heart failure with her family by her side in Islisberg on 13 January 2009.

== Filmography ==
=== Films ===
Year	Title	Role	Note
1972	Casa d'appuntamento	Eleonora	
1973	Ein Käfer auf Extratour	Jacqueline 'Jac' Hegglin	
1973	Die Fabrikanten	Janine Schluep	
1975	The Maddest Car in the World	Schwester Engelmunda	
1975	Crime After School	Sabine	
1977	Lady Dracula	Comtesse Barbara von Weidenborn / Lady Dracula	
1977	Deadly Angels	Miss Eve	
1977	The Mighty Peking Man	Samantha Ah Wei	
1977	Arrête ton char... bidasse!	Karin	
1978	The Fifth Commandment	Evelyn Pages	
1981	Teheran 43	False Secretary	

=== Television ===
Years	Title	Episode	Role
1973	Ein Fall für Männdli	Die Verrückte	Maria Krespi
1976	Klimbim		Herself
1978	Am laufenden Band		Herself
1978	Wie würden Sie entscheiden?	Gitta und die guten Sitten	Gitta
