= Alan Heyman =

South Korean musicologist (1931–2014)

- Born: Alan Charles Heyman; 16 March 1931; New York City
- Died: 1 March 2014 (aged 82); Seoul
- Citizenship: South Korea
- Education: University of Colorado (B.A. 1952); Columbia University (M.A. 1959)
- Known for: Scholar and composer of Korean traditional music

Korean name
- Hangul: 해의만
- Hanja: 海義滿
- RR: Hae Uiman
- MR: Hae Ŭiman

Alan Charles Heyman (16 March 1931 – 1 March 2014), Korean name Hae Eui-man (Korean: 해의만), was a South Korean musicologist and composer. Born in the United States, he first came to South Korea in 1953 with the United States Army during the Korean War, and after completing a graduate degree in music education at Columbia University, moved to South Korea permanently in 1960 to devote himself to research and composition. He led traditional Korean music troupes on tours of North America and Europe, and made significant contributions to the preservation of Korean traditional music, for which he was recognised with awards from national and international organisations. He gave up his U.S. citizenship to become a South Korean citizen in 1995, and remained in the country until his death in 2014.

== In the Korean War ==
Heyman was born in New York City on 16 March 1931 to Charles and Lillian Heyman., who were both Jewish. He went on to attend the University of Colorado, where he majored in music while also studying a pre-medical course, graduating in 1952. After his graduation, Heyman was drafted into the United States Army. He initially knew nothing about Korea; when informed by his senior officer that he would be stationed in Uijeongbu near the South Korean capital Seoul, he asked, "Excuse me sir, in what part of Japan is Uijeongbu?" He would go on to serve as an army medic and lab technician.

Heyman was first exposed to East Asian music during his Korean War service. In 1953, he was attached to a field hospital unit stationed in Gangwon Province. Chinese and North Korean forces stationed on a nearby mountain would often play loud drum, gong, and taepyeongso music over a loudspeaker late at night, using the sound as a non-lethal weapon to try to keep their enemies sleep-deprived. Most of Heyman's comrades found the noise irritating. However, it had the opposite effect on Heyman himself, who was enthralled by the music, describing it as "refreshing and interesting". During the war, he also met the woman who would become his first wife, a nurse.

Heyman returned to the U.S. in 1954. At that point, Heyman did not know the name of the instrument that had so fascinated him, the taepyeongso. He would not find out until after his tour of duty had ended and he had entered Columbia University to start studying towards his master's degree in music education: a fellow graduate student from South Korea informed Heyman, based on the description he provided, that the sound he heard was that of the taepyeongso, which he analogised to a "conical oboe". That same friend would encourage Heyman to go back to South Korea and pursue his interest in Korean music.

== Return to South Korea ==
In 1960, the year after U.S. civilians could officially live in South Korea again, Heyman moved to Insa-dong in Seoul. He states that he was the only passenger on the Northwest Airlines flight which brought him back to the country. He enrolled in the Korea Traditional Musical Arts Conservatory near his house, offering free English lessons in exchange for his studies. He also married the nurse whom he had met during the war. He took on a variety of other odd jobs to support his family. As he was not yet fluent in the Korean language at the time, he faced numerous difficulties in his studies, though he later stated, "Luckily, in music one can learn much by example and observation, without the need for language." Aside from the taepyeongso, he also learned to play a number of other traditional Korean musical instruments, including the gayageum, the piri, and the janggu, as well as Korean dances such as the talchum and dances related to nongak. Among his teachers was Im Bang-ul. Though he eventually attained fluency in Korean, he later admitted he did not read hanja very well.

Heyman was initially nervous whether he could find success in his chosen field, but his confidence and reputation grew after a 1962 performance he gave, the first in which a foreigner had performed Korean traditional music on stage. He recalled that "the audience was flabbergasted. They couldn't believe that they were seeing a foreigner perform Korean music." He even performed for South Korean president Yun Bo-seon. In 1964, with the sponsorship of the Asia Society, he organised a twenty-seven city tour of the U.S. for traditional Korean music group Sam Chun Li. Among the highlights, they performed at the Lincoln Center and on national television on The Tonight Show. However, the tour's success was damaged by negative rumours about their shows spread by a rival musical group, which resulted in cancellations by 17 out of 27 universities where they had scheduled performances; their sponsors refused to pay the musicians their contracted wages, and Heyman had to make up the difference out of his own pocket.

In 1973, Heyman led another troupe of National Gugak Center musicians on a tour of Europe. Again he ended up incurring unexpected expenses: the troupe arrived in Berlin and took a bus through East Germany on the way to the rest of Europe, but on the way back to Berlin a South Korean consular official in Paris demanded they fly instead of taking the bus, fearing that East German authorities might detain the musicians and turn them over to the North Koreans. Around that time, Heyman also considered moving back to the United States to take a position as an instructor in traditional Korean music and dance at Brown University, but the university cancelled its plans to hire him at the last minute. Instead he chose to remain in South Korea. His first wife died after a protracted struggle with liver cancer in 1985, leaving him with large debts as the couple had lacked medical insurance to pay for her treatments.

== Naturalisation and later life ==
Heyman applied for naturalisation as a South Korean citizen in 1995, after more than thirty years of living in the country. He first faced a grueling naturalisation test, in which only two students passed the written portion; however, the oral portion was much simpler for him, as his interviewer asked him only to tell the tale of Heungbu and Nolbu, which he knew quite well from his pansori studies. As South Korea did not permit dual citizenship at the time, he then gave up his U.S. citizenship. He took the Korean name Hae Eui-man. In September 2010, he donated a large amount of the research materials he had collected over the years to the National Gugak Center.

In his old age, Heyman suffered from declining health, in particular spinal problems, but maintained good humour about his physical limitations. Heyman died at his home in Hwagok-dong, Seoul on the evening of 1 March 2014. His wake was held at Severance Hospital in Sinchon-dong two days later. He was survived by his second wife Ok-ja Choi, son Seong-gwang Hae, also a scholar of Korean music, another son Seon-ju Hae, an entrepreneur, and daughter Laam Hae, a professor at York University in Canada.

== Music and scholarship ==
In the 1960s, Heyman also began taking an interest in the music of Donald Sur, a Hawaii-born composer whose works drew inspiration from the traditional music of his Korean immigrant forebears, as well as that of Alan Hovhaness and Lou Harrison, who had both visited South Korea and were influenced by the music they encountered there. However, he was an opponent of attempts to adapt Korean music to Western sensibilities in the name of modernisation. In 1985, he was particularly critical of Hwang Byungki's efforts in this regard in the composition Migung, calling it "Hwang's one and only venture into the abstract madness of modern music, and it is surely hoped that it will remain just that", and recounting an anecdote of a woman who ran "screaming from the concert hall" upon hearing it performed.

Among the odd jobs that Heyman took to support himself and his wife during his music studies in the 1960s, he composed film scores for various films set in South Korea; by 1968, he had nearly a dozen such credits to his name, mostly documentaries. One non-documentary one was Northeast of Seoul, a 1972 thriller directed by David Lowell Rich. His English translation of Im Sok-jae's Mu-ga: The Ritual Songs of Korean Mudangs, sponsored by the Korea Literature Translation Association, was published by Asian Humanities Press in 2003. In the last years of his life, Heyman worked on what he described as his "magnum opus", translating historical materials relating to the past half-century of the Korean National Folk Arts Festival.

Heyman received various awards recognising his contributions to the study, preservation, and documentation of Korean traditional music. He received a UNESCO cultural award in 1991. In 1995, he was awarded the South Korean government's Order of Cultural Merit. President Lee Myung-bak awarded Heyman the Silver Crown Order of Cultural Merit in April 2011 in recognition of his contributions to the National Gugak Center. That month he also received an award from the National Gugak Center on the occasion of their 60th anniversary. In June 2011, he was inducted into the Royal Asiatic Society Korea Branch as an honorary lifetime member.
