= Desert of Fire =

Desert of Fire may refer to:

- Desert of Fire (miniseries), a TV miniseries
- Desert of Fire (1971 film), an Italian adventure film
