= Nelson de la Rosa =

Dominican actor (c. 1967/68–2006)

Nelson de la Rosa Martínez
- Born: 1967 or 1968; Dominican Republic
- Died: October 22, 2006 (aged 38); Providence, Rhode Island
- Other name: Mahow
- Occupation: Actor
- Years active: 1987–2006
- Spouse: Jennifer De Leonel

Nelson de la Rosa Martínez (c. 1967/1968 – October 22, 2006), a.k.a. Mahow, was a Dominican actor and one of the shortest men of the 20th and 21st centuries. Nelson measured 71 centimeters tall (about 2 feet 4 inches). His stature was caused by Seckel syndrome.

== Acting career ==
De la Rosa starred in the 1987 Italian horror film Ratman, which was shot in the Dominican Republic. During the 1990s, De la Rosa was a recurring guest on several talk and variety programs, such as Venevision's Súper Sábado Sensacional in Venezuela, Don Francisco's Sábado Gigante, many Univision programs, and Susana Giménez's show. De la Rosa additionally appeared in similar shows internationally, including, but not limited to programs from Puerto Rico, Mexico, and Spain. He married, and had a son.

De la Rosa appeared in the 1996 remake The Island of Dr. Moreau, where he shared scenes with Marlon Brando, among others. De la Rosa's performance is later cited as the inspiration for the Austin Powers character Mini-Me, as well as Kevin who accompanies Dr. Alphonse Mephesto in South Park. De la Rosa also appeared in the video for the song "Coolo" by the Argentine hip hop group Illya Kuryaki and the Valderramas.

Prior to his death, De la Rosa had been approached by many American media operators to gain permission for a documentary about his life. No documentaries have been released, however.

== Life ==
De la Rosa befriended then-Boston Red Sox pitcher and fellow Dominican Pedro Martínez, who began to take De la Rosa to games as a good luck charm during the 2004 MLB playoffs.

He was a main attraction in the "Hermanos Mazzini" and "Las Águilas Humanas" circuses, which marketed him as the Guinness World Record-holder for world's smallest man at 54 cm (21.25 inches), though this organization does not endorse this claim.

== Death ==
He died at the age of 38, October 22, 2006, in Providence, Rhode Island, USA, reportedly from heart failure. He is survived by his wife, Jennifer De Leonel, and son, who at the time was 9 years old. His remains were transferred to the Dominican Republic, and buried in the Cristo Redentor Cemetery.
