= Mario Sequi =

- Born: 30 June 1913; Cagliari, Sardinia, Italy
- Died: 1992 (aged 78–79); Rome, Lazio, Italy
- Occupations: Director, Writer
- Years active: 1938–1975 (film)

Mario Sequi (30 June 1913 – 1992) was an Italian film director and screenwriter. A Sardinian by birth, he was married to the actress Lia Franca. He began his career in the 1930s as a production manager in the 1930s before becoming a director after the Second World War.

== Selected filmography ==
=== Production manager ===
- I Met You Too Late (1940)
- Il vetturale del San Gottardo (1941)
- C'è un fantasma nel castello (1942)
- Orizzonte di sangue (1942)
- The White Angel (1943)

=== Assistant director ===
- O sole mio (1946)
- Peddlin' in Society (1946)

=== Director ===
- L'isola di Montecristo (1948)
- The Monastery of Santa Chiara (1949)
- Altura (1949)
- Tragic Spell (1951)
- The Tramplers (1965)
- The Cobra (1967)
- The Tigers of Mompracem (1970)
- The Silkworm (1973)

== Bibliography ==
- Bayman, Louis. The Operatic and the Everyday in Postwar Italian Film Melodrama. Edinburgh University Press, 2014.
