= Felice Quinto =

Italian photographer

- Born: 1929; Milan
- Died: 16 January 2010 (aged 80–81); Rockville, Maryland
- Occupation: Photographer
- Known for: Paparazzi pioneer

Felice Quinto (1929 – 16 January 2010) was an Italian photographer. He was known for his photographs of celebrities and often referred to as the "king of paparazzi." It is reported that he was the inspiration of the paparazzi character in Federico Fellini's 1960 film La Dolce Vita.

== Biography ==
Quinto was born in Milan in 1929. He later moved to Rome.

=== Career in Europe ===
Quinto began working as a photographer c. 1956. After striking up a friendship with director Federico Fellini, he was offered a role in Fellini's upcoming film, La Dolce Vita. Quinto declined the offer for financial reasons, although he did take a role as an extra. He has been reported as being the inspiration for that film's character Paparazzo.

In 1960, Quinto took pictures of actress Anita Ekberg and a married movie producer sharing a kiss. Ekberg, who had coincidentally starred as a starlet targeted by paparazzi in La Dolce Vita, is reported to have later shot at him with a bow and arrow in the early morning as he waited outside her house; the shots injured Quinto in his hand.

Two years later, Quinto took a picture of Elizabeth Taylor in a "compromising" position with Richard Burton while she was filming Cleopatra. The proof of Taylor's relationship with Burton while both were still married caused a scandal to erupt, with Taylor being condemned by both the United States House of Representatives and the Vatican. The image has been credited as establishing the reputation of the paparazzi, described by Maureen Callahan of The New York Post as being "documentarians of postmodern culture".

=== Life in America ===
In 1963, Quinto moved to the United States to work for the Associated Press (AP) after marrying Geraldine Del Giorno. As a photographer for the AP, he covered the funeral of John F. Kennedy and marches in the Civil Rights Movement. He then went on to work at Studio 54.

Quinto retired in 1993.

On 16 January 2010, Quinto died of pneumonia in Rockville, Maryland.

== Legacy ==
Quinto has been called the "king of the paparazzi" and is noted as pioneering several common paparazzi techniques, including hiding in bushes, wearing disguises, and following his targets throughout the city.

== Publications ==
- Studio 54: the Legend. teNeues, 1997. Photographs by Quinto; text by Anthony Haden-Guest; concept and additional text by Niels Kummer. ISBN 9783823821182.
