= Ratman =

1988 film by Giuliano Carnimeo

- Original poster
- Directed by: Giuliano Carnimeo
- Written by: Dardano Sacchetti
- Produced by: Fabrizio De Angelis
- Starring: David Warbeck; Janet Ågren; Eva Grimaldi; Luisa Menon; Werner Pochath; Nelson de la Rosa
- Cinematography: Roberto Girometti
- Edited by: Vincenzo Tomassi
- Music by: Stefano Mainetti
- Distributed by: Fulvia Film
- Release date: 1988
- Running time: 82 minutes
- Country: Italy
- Language: Italian

Ratman (Italian: Quella villa in fondo al parco) is a 1988 Italian exploitation horror film directed by Giuliano Carnimeo.

== Plot ==
Two models, Marlis and Peggy, are on a Caribbean Island for a photoshoot. One night, Peggy is found dead and her body seems to be eaten by rats.

The victim's sister, Terry, arrives on the island and helped by Fred Williams, a mystery novel writer she meets at the airport, starts to investigate. Meanwhile, Marlis and the photographer find other corpses in the jungle. Searching for help, they stopped at an isolated house just to discover that the landlord is a scientist who created a ferocious mutant half-ape, half rat.

== Cast ==
- Eva Grimaldi as Marlis
- Cinzia De Carolis as Marlis (Italian dubbed)
- Pat Starke as Marlis (English dubbed)
- David Warbeck as Fred Williams
- Antonio Colonnello as Fred Williams (Italian dubbed)
- Janet Ågren as Terry
- Laura Gianoli as Terry (Italian dubbed)
- Carolyn De Fonseca as Terry (English dubbed)
- Luisa Menon as Peggy
- Aurora Cancian as Peggy (Italian dubbed)
- Werner Pochath as Mark
- Stefano Carraro as Mark (Italian dubbed)
- Nelson de la Rosa as Mousey
- Anna Silvia Grullon as Monique (as Ana Silvia Gruyllon)
- Pepito Guerra as Dr. Olman
- Franklin Dominguez as Police Inspector

== Release ==
Ratman was released in 1988.

== Reception ==
Todd Martin of Horror News Network had praised the film for its gore and acting of Nelson de la Rosa and Eva Grimaldi but criticized the film for its long and boring scenes where blood and gore were not the factors. John White of The Digital Fix gave the film 7 out of 10, criticizing its visual presentation but also mentioning that "Those who love bad monster movies will open their heart to Ratman."

== Home media ==
Ratman was released on DVD in the United Kingdom by Shameless Screen Entertainment on 31 March 2008. It was released uncut for the first time in its most complete version, containing its original aspect ratio of 1.85:1, and it also contains trailers for other Shameless DVD releases, a picture gallery and reversible cover art containing the new DVD release and the original poster-style cover.
