= Eva Grimaldi =

Italian actress and model

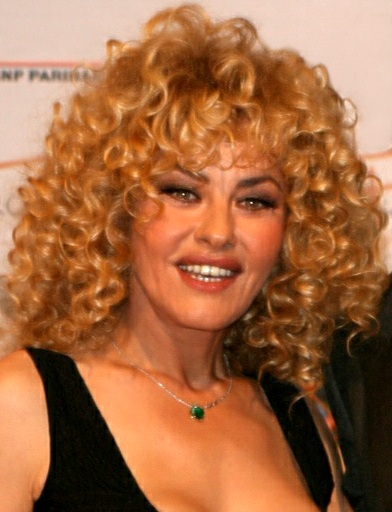
- Grimaldi in 2009
- Born: Milva Perinoni; 7 September 1961 (age 64); Nogarole Rocca, Verona, Italy
- Occupation: Actress
- Years active: 1986–present
- Spouse: Imma Battaglia (m. 2019)

Eva Grimaldi (born Milva Perinoni; 7 September 1961) is an Italian actress and model.

== Biography ==
Born in Nogarole Rocca, Italy, Grimaldi debuted as a nude model in Playmen and as a soubrette in the Antonio Ricci's TV-show Drive In. She made her film debut in Federico Fellini's Intervista, and starred in Giuliano Carnimeo's cult horror film Ratman and Marina Ripa di Meana's Cattive ragazze. From then, she appeared in numerous films and TV-series, including works by Mario Monicelli, Dino Risi, Damiano Damiani, Claude Chabrol, Jean-Marie Poiré and John Irvin. She was also very active on stage, working mainly with Pier Francesco Pingitore.

== Personal life ==
In 2019, she entered into civil union with politician and activist Imma Battaglia. In 2020, she revealed that her relationship with actor Gabriel Garko had been invented by the production company as a publicity stunt. She considers herself Roman Catholic.

== Filmography ==
=== Film ===
Year	Title	Role(s)	Notes
1986	Convent of Sinners	Sister Susanna Simonin	
1987	D'Annunzio	Viola	
1987	Rimini Rimini - Un anno dopo	Flaminia Longheroni	Segment: "La scelta"
1987	Non scommettere mai con il cielo	Sebastiano's mistress	Cameo appearance
1987	The Black Cobra	Elys Trumbo	
1987	Intervista	Photographed woman	Uncredited
1988	Mia moglie è una bestia	Huc	
1988	Pathos	Pearl	
1988	Ratman	Marlis	
1988	Delitti e profumi	Porzia	
1988	Intimo	Thea	
1989	La maschera del demonio	Anibas	
1989	Paganini	Elisa Bonaparte	
1990	Alcune signore per bene	Kiki	
1990	I'll Be Going Now	Ines	
1990	Quiet Days in Clichy	Yvonne	
1990	Dames galantes	Jeanne De Tignoville	
1991	Abbronzatissimi	Elide	
1991	Per sempre	Berenice Rondi	
1992	Cattive ragazze	Alma Denver	
1992	L'angelo con la pistola	Teresa	
1992	Mutande pazze	Stefania	
1993	Abbronzatissimi 2: Un anno dopo	Stella	
1994	Dear Goddamned Friends	Topona	
1995	Les Anges gardiens	Regina Podium	
1998	Simpatici & antipatici	Michela	
1998	Paparazzi	Herself	Cameo appearance
2005	The Fine Art of Love	Simba	
2015	Babbo Natale non viene da nord	Ingrid	
2016	Il traduttore	Mirna	
2018	Il mio uomo perfetto	Lidia	
2018	Respiri	Virginia	

=== Television ===
Year	Title	Role(s)	Notes
1986	Ferragosto OK	Pia	Television movie
1989	Classe di ferro	Carmen	2 episodes
1989	Le Retour d'Arsène Lupin	Arlètte Forlano	Episode: "Rencontre avec le docteur Freud"
1989	Il vigile urbano	Mercedes	Episode: "Suona che ti passa"
1990	Vendetta: Secrets of a Mafia Bride	Brenda	Main role
1996	La signora della città	Nadiuska	Television movie
1998	Ladri si diventa	Vanessa	Television movie
1999	Tre stelle	Anna Folena	Television movie
2001	Occhi verde veleno	Federica Felici	Television movie
2001–2003	Il bello delle donne	Elfride De Contris	Main role
2006	Ballando con le Stelle	Contestant	Talent show (season 3)
2007–2010	Caterina e le sue figlie	Eleonora Gatti	Recurring role
2008	Mogli a pezzi	Sofia La Capra	Main role
2010–2014	Il peccato e la vergogna	Liliana Pratesi	Main role
2011	Viso d'angelo	Miriam Capeci	Main role
2014	Pechino Express	Contestant	Reality show (season 3)
2021–2022	Grande Fratello VIP	Contestant	Reality show (season 6)
