= The Forgotten Pistolero =

1969 film

- German film poster
- Directed by: Ferdinando Baldi
- Screenplay by: Vincenzo Cerami; Pier Giovanni Anchisi; Mario di Nardo; Federico De Urrutia; Ferdinando Baldi
- Based on: Oresteia by Aeschylus (uncredited)
- Produced by: Manolo Bolognini
- Starring: Leonard Mann; Luciana Paluzzi; Peter Martell; Piero Lulli
- Cinematography: Mario Montuori
- Edited by: Eugenio Alabiso
- Music by: Roberto Pregadio
- Production companies: B.R.C. Produzione Film; Ízaro Films
- Distributed by: Produzioni Atlas Consorziate (P.A.C.)
- Release date: 17 October 1969
- Running time: 91 minutes
- Countries: Italy; Spain
- Language: Italian

The Forgotten Pistolero (Italian: Il pistolero dell'Ave Maria, lit. "The Gunman of Hail Mary") is a 1969 Italian Spaghetti Western film co-written and directed by Ferdinando Baldi. The film is a western adaptation of the Greek myth of Orestes, subject of three famous drama-plays by Aeschylus, Sophocles and Euripides. Ulrich P. Bruckner puts it among the "most interesting and most touching Spaghetti Westerns of the late sixties".

== Plot ==
A wounded man by the name of Rafael (Peter Martell) shows up one day at the home of loner Sebastian (Leonard Mann). Sebastian helps him recover and later saves him from a group of gunmen who want him alive. Rafael reveals himself to be his childhood friend and he explains that Maria, the woman who raised Sebastian until her death, was not his mother.

Fifteen years earlier, Sebastian's father, Mexican general Juan Carrasco (José Suárez), was murdered by his treacherous wife Anna (Luciana Paluzzi) and her lover Tomas (Alberto de Mendoza) as part of a plot to take over the hacienda for themselves. Maria, who was the nanny of his children Sebastian and Isabella, escaped with a young Sebastian and raised him as her own child. Sebastian's sister Isabella (Pilar Velázquez), however, witnessed Anna kill Juan and was forced by Tomas into a marriage with shopkeeper Juanito (Luciano Rossi), who is a meek but kind man who only wishes to make Isabella happy and tries to convince her to run away with him, but she refuses, preferring to stay in order to spite and torment her sinful mother.

Having reconnected with Sebastian and told him the truth about his past, Rafael hopes to rescue Isabella. Sebastian agrees and the two separately makes their way to Juárez. Meanwhile, Anna, whose relationship with Tomas has since soured, learns of her henchmen's failure to capture Rafael and realizes that Sebastian is alive. While Tomas wants to have the children killed to prevent the truth from coming out, Anna is unwilling to have any more deaths on her conscience.

In Juárez, Rafael reunites with Sebastian, but he is ambushed and captured by Anna's henchmen. Sebastian sees this and rescues Rafael once more. Fed up with Anna's misgivings, Tomas has Isabella abducted as a way to lure Sebastian into a trap and deal with both siblings once and for all, but with the help of Juanito, Sebastian rescues her. At their father's grave, Isabella learns that he is her long-lost brother and pleads to him to help her get revenge on Anna and Tomas. Together, they go to the Carrasco hacienda to confront their mother and stepfather.

A terrified Anna tries to save herself by putting the blame for Juan's murder on Tomas, but he shoots her and then Juanito when he tries to intervene. Sebastian rushes to disarm him and a candle is knocked over in the scuffle, setting fire to the mansion. As Tomas runs away, a dying Anna tells Isabella and Sebastian that she is not their biological mother. In shock, Isabella walks upstairs to the very spot where she witnessed the death of her father fifteen years ago and starts laughing hysterically. Having given chase to Tomas, Rafael gets stabbed, but is saved by Sebastian and runs to carry Isabella to safety while Sebastian guns down his stepfather. Together, they leave as the mansion is engulfed in flames.

== Cast ==
- Leonard Mann as Sebastian Carrasco
- Luciana Paluzzi as Anna Carrasco
- Peter Martell as Rafael Garcia
- Alberto de Mendoza as Tomas
- Pilar Velázquez as Isabella Carrasco
- Piero Lulli as Francisco
- Luciano Rossi as Juanito
- José Suárez as General Juan Carrasco
- Barbara Nelly as Conchita
- Enzo Fiermonte as Friar
- José Manuel Martín as Miguel

== Releases ==
Wild East Productions released this on a limited edition DVD in 2007 with The Unholy Four.

== See also ==
- List of Italian films of 1969
- List of Spaghetti Western films
