= Peter Martell =

Italian film actor

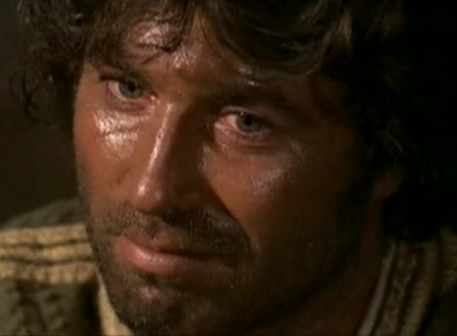
- Martell in The Forgotten Pistolero (1969)
- Born: Pietro Martellanza; 30 September 1938; Bolzano, Italy
- Died: 1 February 2010 (aged 71); Bolzano, Italy
- Occupations: Actor, model, sailor, stuntman

Pietro Martellanza (30 September 1938 – 1 February 2010), best known as Peter Martell, was an Italian film actor who had numerous bigger roles in Spaghetti westerns. Sometimes he was credited as Pete Martell or Peter Martel.

== Career ==
Born in Bolzano, he started his career in cinema as a stuntman. He was mainly active in the 1960s and 1970s, appearing in about 70 films. After a longer break he starred in some movies again from 2002 on.

Martell was chosen as the leading actor in God Forgives... I Don't!, but the day before the first shoot he broke his foot during a fight with his girlfriend and was replaced by Terence Hill, which started Hill's successful partnership with Bud Spencer. Martell was set to play Trinity when They Call Me Trinity (1970) was first announced, and George Eastman Bambino. The two characters were later portrayed by Terence Hill and Bud Spencer, who were then a popular comic duo following the release of Western film God Forgives... I Don't!.

== Filmography ==
Year	Title	Role	Notes
1963	The Commandant	Giovane ufficiale	
1965	La violenza e l'amore	Delinquente	
1966	Il pianeta errante	Dubrowski	
1966	Arizona Colt	Rancher	Uncredited
1966	My Name Is Pecos		
1967	Fury of Johnny Kid	Rodrigo Campos	
1967	Two Crosses at Danger Pass	Alex Mitchell	
1967	The Cobra	Mike Rand	
1967	Date for a Murder	Car mechanic	
1967	Come rubare un quintale di diamanti in Russia	Alain	
1967	Lola Colt	Rod Strater	
1968	Ringo the Lone Rider	Dan Blake / Capt. Bly / Ringo	
1968	Bandits in Milan	The Protector	
1968	Long Days of Hate	Tony Guy	
1968	God Made Them... I Kill Them	Don Luis del la Vega / Rod Douglas	
1968	May God Forgive You... But I Won't	Jack Smart	
1968	Il lungo giorno del massacro	Joe Williams	
1969	Probabilità zero	Sam the Brit	
1969	The Tough and the Mighty	Antonio Masala	
1969	The Forgotten Pistolero	Rafael Garcia	
1970	The Bloody Judge	Barnaby	
1970	The Unholy Four	Silver	
1971	Desert of Fire	Bill	
1971	Il suo nome era Pot	Kid 'Pot' Potter / Allegria / Cheerful	
1971	Savage Guns	Peter Martell	Uncredited
1972	The French Sex Murders	Antoine Gottvalles	
1972	Death Walks at Midnight	Stefano	
1974	Die Stoßburg	Kasimir	
1974	Laß jucken, Kumpel 3. Teil – Maloche, Bier und Bett	Mario	
1974	Liebesgrüße aus der Lederhose II. Teil: Zwei Kumpel auf der Alm	Mario	
1974	La pazienza ha un limite... noi no!	'Pupo' Bill McDonald	
1976	Street People	Pano	
1976	Safari Express	Howard Spring	
1986	Momo	Grauer Herr	Uncredited
1987	Tenerezza		
2002	Killer Barbys vs. Dracula	False Dracula	
2004	Tears of Kali	Lars Eriksson	(segment "Poona, India 1983")
2009	Melancholie der Engel	Heinrich	
