= The Perfect Crime (1978 film) =

1978 film

- Film poster
- Directed by: Giuseppe Rosati
- Written by: Giuseppe Rosati
- Starring: Leonard Mann; Janet Agren; Joseph Cotten; Adolfo Celli; Alida Valli; Paul Muller; Gloria Guida
- Edited by: Franco Fraticelli
- Music by: Carlo Savina
- Release date: 24 November 1978
- Running time: 87 minutes
- Country: Italy
- Language: Italian

The Perfect Crime (Italian: Indagine su un delitto perfetto/ Investigation of a Perfect Crime) is a 1978 Italian giallo-crime film directed by Giuseppe Rosati and starring Leonard Mann. It was one of the last features for actor Anthony Steel.

== Cast ==
- Gloria Guida as Polly Rennie
- Leonard Mann as Sir Paul De Revere
- Joseph Cotten as Sir Arthur Dundy
- Adolfo Celi as Sir Harold Boyd
- Anthony Steel as Superintendent Jeff Hawks
- Janet Agren as Lady Gloria Boyd
- Alida Valli as Lady Clementine de Revere
- Franco Ressel as Sergeant Phillips
- Paul Muller as Gibson
- Mario Novelli (credited as Anthony Freeman) as Saboteur
- Elio Stefanizzi
- Claudio Gora
- Tom Felleghy as Dr. Hobbes (uncredited)
