= Leonard Mann (actor) =

American social worker, writer, and actor

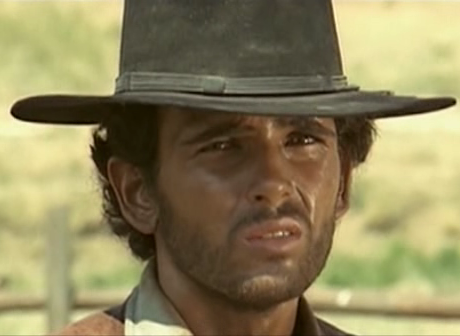
- Mann in The Forgotten Pistolero (1969)
- Born: Leonardo Manzella; March 1, 1947 (age 79); Albion, New York, U.S.
- Occupations: Social worker, writer, film actor
- Years active: 1969-1989 (as actor)

Leonardo Manzella (born March 1, 1947), best known as Leonard Mann, is an American social worker, writer, and former actor. He played numerous leading roles in Italian genre films between 1969 and 1989, especially in Spaghetti westerns and poliziotteschi.

He was discovered by producer Manolo Bolognini as he was walking along Via Veneto and Bolognini, impressed by his face that reminded him of Franco Nero and Terence Hill, immediately put him on the screen, launching his career with the leading role of Sebastian in The Forgotten Pistolero.

Since retiring from showbusiness in 1989, he has worked as a social worker and therapist for the Los Angeles Unified School District in addition to a private practice San Luis Obispo. A vocal advocate of prison reform, he has written and produced a play, Cages, about his experiences working with inmates.

== Selected filmography ==
- The Forgotten Pistolero (1969)
- Youth March (1969)
- Chuck Moll (1970)
- Vengeance Is a Dish Served Cold (1971)
- Amore amaro (1974)
- The Body (1974)
- Rudeness (1975)
- (TV) "Charlie's Angels" (1976)
- The Left Hand of the Law (1976)
- Weapons of Death (1977)
- Wifemistress (1977)
- The Criminals Attack. The Police Respond. (1977)
- Death Steps in the Dark (1977)
- The Perfect Crime (1978)
- The Humanoid (1979)
- Night School (1981)
- Copkiller (1983)
- Unfaithfully Yours (1984)
- Cut and Run (1985)
- Flowers in the Attic (1987)
- Silent Night, Deadly Night 3: Better Watch Out! (1989)
