= Tears of Kali =

- DVD cover
- Directed by: Andreas Marschall
- Written by: Andreas Marschall
- Produced by: Tim Luna (as Heiner Thimm); Olivera Becker
- Starring: Peter Martell; Anja Gebel; Mathieu Carrière; Adrian Topol; Mandeep Dhillon; Michael Balaun; Marcel; Cora Chilcott
- Cinematography: Heiko Merten; Michael Schuff
- Edited by: Andreas Marschall
- Music by: Bharti India; Panama John
- Production companies: Cut and Run Production; Lopta Film
- Distributed by: Anolis Entertainment
- Release date: 26 March 2004 (Belgium)
- Running time: 106 minutes
- Country: Germany
- Language: German

Tears of Kali is a 2004 German horror film directed by Andreas Marschall.

== Plot ==
In India of the 70s and 80s, various sects were founded to meditation and self-help. One of this sects is the so-called Taylor-Eriksson-group, which exorcise the "dark part of the human souls" with the help of radical experiments. All members had taken the vow of silence and its nearly impossible to get information about the group's practices, after the sects are disbanded.

The film is an anthology that connects three independent German horror short films, using the mysterious cult of this sect as a wrap-around story. During the film, the dark secrets of the sect are become known. The three chapters of the movie are named after motives from the Hinduism and are about the former members of the Taylor-Eriksson-group.

=== Chapter 1: Shakti ===
The journalist Tansu Yilmaz is visiting a psychiatry in Berlin to get more information of Elisabeth Steinberg, a former member of the sect. Steinberg is suspected for the complicity in the mysterious death of her guru Sarmafan. Supposedly, she instigated an communard from his sect to murder the guru. Yilmaz is engage her in a lot of contradictions and finds out the truth. Beginning as an interview, it follows a nightmarish struggle of life or death.

=== Chapter 2: Devi ===
Dr. Steiner should help the hooligan Robin Borg, who is trying to escape from the therapeutic approaches by Steiner. Because of the honesty and aggressiveness of Robin, the doctor is mocking his patient. Finally, Steiner taken the first sentence of Robin in the conversation, "I want to get out of my skin!", literally, and force him to shedding his skin using hypnosis.

=== Chapter 3: Kali ===
The healer Edgar, medicate the patient Mira in a group therapy. She seems to be afflicted by a mysterious disease since her stay in India. Actually Edgar can heal her, but afterwards, a dark force creeps through the old villa, where the therapies take place. Miras "disease" consequently was a being from an otherworldly dimension, which is need of a new host.

== Release ==
=== Home media ===
Tears of Kali was released on DVD by Maverick Entertainment Group on January 3, 2006 and by Revolver Films on January 30, that same year.

== Reception ==
Joel Harley from HorrorNews.net gave the film a mostly positive review, writing "Tears of Kali is a very interesting anthology film packed full of gruesome gore, several scary stories (with a compelling overarching theme) and above hall, a deeply disturbing sense of horror." Keith Hennessey Brown from Eye for Film awarded the film a mixed two and a half out of five stars, criticizing the film's performances, and weak narrative, but summarized that the film "an effective low-budget calling-card that achieves a nice balance between pleasing the hardgore crowd without becoming an unpleasant exercise in gratuitous gore for gore sake." Kevin Thomas from eFilmCritic rated the film 3/5 stars, criticizing the film's lack of narrative focus and unoriginality, stating that film contained "Too much mystery and gore without the solid foundations to justify it."
