= Marina Ripa di Meana =

Italian socialite and writer (1941–2018)

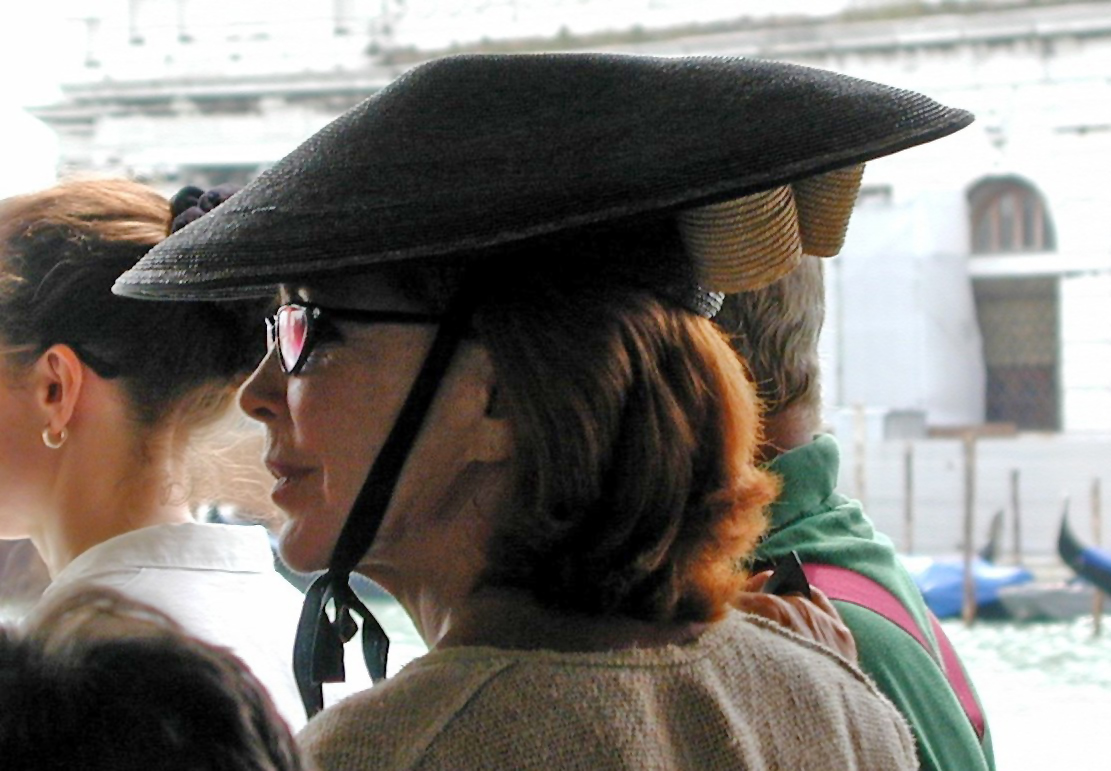
- Marina Ripa di Meana in Venice, 2003
- Born: Maria Elide Punturieri; 21 October 1941; Reggio Calabria, Kingdom of Italy
- Died: 5 January 2018 (aged 76); Rome, Italy
- Occupations: Writer; actress; director; stylist; activist television personality; noblewoman
- Years active: 1970–2017
- Spouses: Alessandro Lante della Rovere (m. 1964, divorced) Carlo Ripa di Meana (m. 1982)
- Children: 2 (including Lucrezia Lante della Rovere)

Marina Ripa di Meana (born Maria Elide Punturieri and previously known as Marina Lante della Rovere; 21 October 1941 – 5 January 2018) was an Italian socialite, writer, actress, director, stylist, activist and television personality.

== Early life ==
Ripa di Meana was born and grew up in Reggio Calabria, Italy. Her parents were Lionello Punturieri and Vittorina Bedoni. One of her parents was a lawyer in Rome.

== Career ==
On completing studies in her hometown, Ripa di Meana opened a fashion boutique in Piazza di Spagna, in Rome, in partnership with her friend Paola Ruffo di Calabria. The store was frequented by influential women of high society and Ripa di Meana became involved with leading political, diplomatic, artistic and media figures.

From the 1970s she began to appear on television as a commentator and panel member in debates on politics, the environment and the defense of animals. In 1979 she appeared in a film, Assassinio sul Tevere, directed by Bruno Corbucci, however she declined to continue in films as she said she disliked being commanded. She did however direct a feature film, Cattive ragazze, starring Eva Grimaldi, in 1992. The film attracted some controversy as it had received public funds, allegedly through personal friendships. In 2009 Ripa di Meana participated in a reality TV show, The Farm, and played herself in an episode of the television series I Cesaroni.

Ripa di Meana wrote 14 books and is probably best known for her first two autobiographical books, I miei primi quarant'anni (My First Forty Years, 1984) and La più bella del reame (The Most Beautiful in the Realm, 1988), which became bestsellers and generated two successful movies with the same titles, both starring Carol Alt. Her last books were also autobiographical: Invecchierò Ma Con Calma (I Will Grow Old But Calmly, 2012) and Colazione al Grand Hotel (Breakfast at the Grand Hotel, 2016). In 1990 she launched the monthly magazine Elite, published by Newton Compton Editori, and edited it for two years.

Ripa di Meana was also known for her stance on animal cruelty and environmentalism. From the 1990s she participated in various campaigns against the killing of seals, the use of fur and skin in fashion, bullfights in Spain and French nuclear experiments on Moruroa atoll. In 1995 she became Ambassador to Italy for IFAW (International Fund for Animal Welfare). She controversially posed naked for an IFAW anti-fur campaign, showing pubic hair with the caption "The only fur that I'm not ashamed to wear'. In 2008, she campaigned against the closure of San Giacomo Hospital in Rome.

== Personal life ==
In 1964 Ripa di Meana married Alessandro Lante della Rovere, a nobleman; they had one daughter, Lucrezia Lante della Rovere. In the 1970s she had relationships with artist Franco Angeli and journalist Lino Jannuzzi. In 1982 she married Carlo Ripa di Meana, a politician. With Carlo, she adopted an adult man, Andrea Cardella Ripa di Meana (born Andrea Cardella).

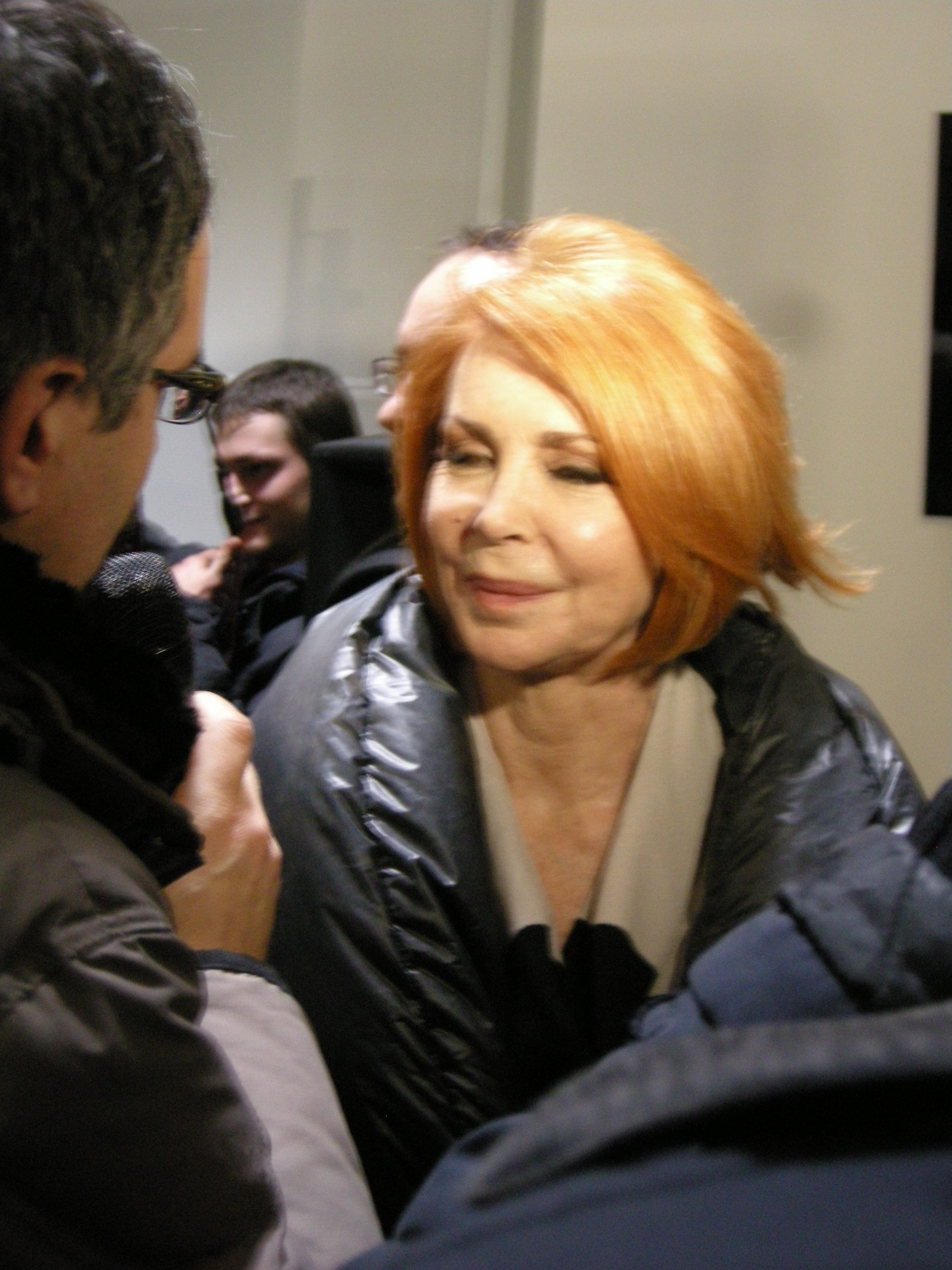
Marina Ripa di Meana in 2011

== Death ==
Ripa di Meana died at her home in Rome on 5 January 2018, aged 76, survived by her husband, daughter and grandchildren. She had had cancer for over 16 years, beginning with the discovery of a renal cell carcinoma in its early stages. She had the kidney removed and underwent chemotherapy, three operations on her lungs, and drug treatments. Ripa di Meana frequently spoke publicly about the impact of the disease and her treatment and urged others to have themselves screened in order to identify cancer early. In May 2017, she appeared on television in an interview with Barbara D'Urso wearing a facial veil; as she had had severe allergic reactions to prescribed medicines, her face was severely disfigured by erythema. She later stated that she wanted to encourage patients to continue with treatments in spite of the side effects or issues involved.

Although she had considered assisted suicide in Switzerland, Ripa di Meana chose to receive deep palliative sedation and discussed this choice in a videotaped announcement which was broadcast by TG5 before her death. Ripa di Meana appeared in the video with Maria Antonietta Coscioni, deputy of the Democratic Party and widow of Luca Coscioni, known for her work with terminally ill people. In it, she said "even at home, or in a hospital, with a tumor, a person must know that they can choose to return to earth without further and unnecessary suffering."

Her husband Carlo died two months later, on 2 March 2018, aged 88.
