= Amore amaro =

1974 film

- Directed by: Florestano Vancini
- Written by: Suso Cecchi d'Amico; Florestano Vancini
- Starring: Lisa Gastoni; Leonard Mann
- Cinematography: Dario Di Palma
- Edited by: Nino Baragli
- Music by: Armando Trovajoli
- Release date: 1974
- Country: Italy
- Language: Italian

Amore amaro (internationally released as Bitter Love and Renata) is a 1974 Italian drama film directed by Florestano Vancini. For this film Lisa Gastoni was awarded with a Silver Ribbon for best actress.

== Plot ==
The film, set in the Ferrara of the 1930s, tells the story of an impossible love between a young student, Antonio Olivieri (Leonard Mann) and a thirty-five-year-old widow with children, Renata Andreoli (Lisa Gastoni). Indeed the social differences and their irreconcilable political leanings would impede the development of their relationship.

== Cast ==
- Lisa Gastoni as Renata Andreoli
- Leonard Mann as Antonio Olivieri
- Rita Livesi as Renata's mother
- Germano Longo as Francesco Galli
- Maurizio Fiori as Vittorio
