= Casa d'appuntamento =

1972 giallo film

The French Sex Murders
- Directed by: Ferdinando Merighi; (as F.L. Morris)
- Screenplay by: Marius Mattei; Ferdinando Merighi; Robert Oliver
- Story by: Paolo Daniele
- Produced by: Dick Randall; Marius Mattei
- Starring: Evelyne Kraft; Rosalba Neri; Howard Vernon; Robert Sacchi; Renato Romano; Peter Martell; Barbara Bouchet; Anita Ekberg; Franco Borelli; Rolf Eden; Eva Astor
- Cinematography: Mario Mancini; Gunter Otto
- Edited by: Bruno Mattei
- Music by: Bruno Nicolai
- Production companies: Costantino International Films; Gopa-Film
- Distributed by: Variety Distribution
- Release date: 16 June 1972 (Italy)
- Running time: 88 minutes
- Countries: Italy; West Germany
- Language: Italian

The French Sex Murders (Italian: Casa d'appuntamento, lit. 'House of Rendezvous') is a 1972 giallo film directed by Ferdinando Merighi under the pseudonym "F. L. Morris" and edited by Bruno Mattei. It was released as The French Sex Murders in the United States, The Bogey Man and the French Murders in the United Kingdom, and Meurtre dans la 17e avenue in France. It stars Rosalba Neri, Anita Ekberg, Barbara Bouchet, Howard Vernon and Gordon Mitchell. The actor who played the police inspector in this film (Robert Sacchi) was a professional Humphrey Bogart lookalike, which explains the alternate "Bogey Man" title. Special effects technician Carlo Rambaldi handled the throat slashings and beheadings that take place in the movie.

== Plot ==
A petty criminal named Antoine (Peter Martell) is blamed for the murder of a prostitute who was killed at Madame Collette's exclusive whorehouse in Paris. He is sentenced to death by guillotine, and he swears revenge on everyone who helped convict him. At the last moment, he manages to escape from the prison – but is then decapitated in a motorcycle accident. A scientist Prof. Waldemar obtains the criminal's severed head from the morgue for purposes of experimentation. The judge, who sentenced Antoine to death later turns up murdered, and then one by one, the prostitutes at Madame Collette's begin turning up murdered as well. Everyone believes that Antoine is causing the murders to happen, and that he is wreaking vengeance from beyond the grave.

== Cast ==
=== Main ===
- Anita Ekberg as Madame Colette
- Rosalba Neri as Marianne
- Evelyne Kraft as Eleonora (Credited as Evelyne Elgar)
- Howard Vernon as Professor Waldemar
- Pietro Martellanza as Antoine Gottvalles (Credited as Peter Martell)
- Barbara Bouchet as Francine
- Robert Sacchi as Inspector Fontaine
- Eva Astor as Florence
- Renato Romano as Mr. Randall
- Rolf Eden as Pepi
- Franco Borelli as Roger Delluc
- Piera Viotti as Tina
- William Alexander as George
- Ada Pometti as Doris, the Maid
- Alessandro Perrella as Doris' Lover

=== Cameo/Uncredited ===
- Flavia Keyt as Prostitute
- Gordon Mitchell as Man In Nightclub
- Mike Monty as Detective
- Xiro Papas as Thug In Bar
- Riccardo Petrazzi as Other Man Repairing A Van
- Dick Randall as Mr. Hassan
- Goffredo Unger as Man Repairing A Van

== Critical reception ==
Robert Firsching of AllMovie gave it a mixed review, writing "The contrived script [...] is completely off the hook, which fans of the giallo form will be expecting, but those who come to the film cold may be somewhat nonplussed."

DVDTalk noted: "the production particulars of French Sex Murders are more interesting than the film itself"..." plot simply strings together a series of gory murders"..."poor lighting and direction only highlight the phony severed heads and poster paint blood"..."Action scenes are particularly incompetent".
