= Northeast of Seoul =

1972 film by David Lowell Rich

- Directed by: David Lowell Rich
- Written by: Antonio Santean
- Produced by: Paul C. Ross
- Starring: Anita Ekberg; John Ireland; Victor Buono
- Cinematography: Herb V. Theiss
- Edited by: David Rawlins
- Music by: Alan Heyman
- Production company: Hap Dong Film Production
- Distributed by: Emerson Film Enterprises; Cannon Films
- Release date: 1972
- Running time: 84 minutes
- Country: United States
- Language: English

Northeast of Seoul is a 1972 American action-thriller film directed by David Lowell Rich. It stars Anita Ekberg and John Ireland, with music by Alan Heyman.

== Cast ==
- Anita Ekberg as Katherine
- John Ireland as Flanaghan
- Victor Buono as Portman
- Yung-Kyoon Sin as Captain Lee
- Chi-He Choi as Miss Kim
- Oh-Sang Kwon as Smim
- Invan Stansby as South African
- Jae-Daf Go as Manchurian
- Young-Sun Kak as Moh
- Sam Chae as Chae Sakamon
- Yong-Nam Jioe as Kang
