= Gold of the Amazon Women =

- Genre: Adventure
- Written by: Stanley Ralph Ross (as Sue Donem)
- Directed by: Mark L. Lester
- Starring: Bo Svenson; Anita Ekberg; Donald Pleasence
- Theme music composer: Gil Mellé
- Country of origin: United States
- Original language: English

Production
- Executive producers: Charles Pati; Stanley Ralph Ross
- Producer: Alfredo Leone
- Production locations: Universal Studios Lot - 100 Universal City Plaza, Universal City, California
- Cinematography: David L. Quaid
- Editor: Michael Luciano
- Running time: 100 min.
- Production company: Mica Productions

Original release
- Network: NBC
- Release: March 6, 1979

Gold of the Amazon Women is a 1979 American TV film directed by Mark L. Lester.

== Plot ==
An adventurer searches for treasure.

== Cast ==
- Bo Svenson as Tom Jensen
- Anita Ekberg as Queen Na-Eela
- Donald Pleasence as Clarence Blasko
- Richard Romanus as Luis Rodriguez
- Bob Minor as Noboro
- Maggie Jean Smith as Reina
- Bond Gideon as Taimi
- Susan Miller as Oriana
- Yasmine as Lee-Leeo

== Production ==
The Los Angeles Times thought it had "its hilarious moments" but was "done in" by the "long-winded script".
