= The Unholy Four (1970 film) =

1970 film

Chuck Mool
- Belgian film poster
- Directed by: Enzo Barboni
- Screenplay by: Mario di Nardo; Franco Rossetti
- Story by: Franco Rossetti
- Produced by: Manolo Bolognini
- Starring: Leonard Mann; Woody Strode; Peter Martell; Luca Montefiori; Helmuth Schneider; Lucio Rosato; Alain Naya; Ewelin Stewart
- Cinematography: Mario Montuori
- Edited by: Eugenio Alabiso
- Music by: Riz Ortolani
- Production companies: B.R.C. Produzione Film; Produzioni Atlas Consorziate (P.A.C.)
- Distributed by: Produzioni Atlas Consorziate (P.A.C.)
- Release date: 1970
- Running time: 95 minutes
- Country: Italy

The Unholy Four (Italian: Ciakmull (L'uomo della vendetta), lit. "Ciakmull (The vengeful man)"), also known as Chuck Mool, is a 1970 Italian Spaghetti Western. The film represents the directorial debut of Enzo Barboni, who was, until then, a respected cinematographer. He replaced Ferdinando Baldi, who was fired by the producer Manolo Bolognini because of his insistence in wanting to engage the actress Annabella Incontrera in the role of Sheila.

== Plot ==
When a violent gang robs a bank, they also commit arson because the diversion eases their getaway. While the local prison is burning, four of its inmates profit from the general turmoil too. Among the four escapees is Chuck Mool, a young man suffering with amnesia, who only remembers about his previous life that he has been home in the town Oxaca. For lack of a better idea all the fugitives go there. It shows that Mool is not forgotten in Oxaca. Lion Udo, the father of one of the bankrobbers, recognizes Mool. He, whose clan has a feud with Mool's family, takes advantage of his condition by turning him against his own kin. Before this plan works out, Mool is warned in time by one of his fellow fugitives. Mool contacts his half-brother Alan and his father John Caldwell. Only then he learns what caused his amnesia and why he'd ended up in prison. It was Alan who once mistreated Mool and ran a scheme to put him away. He hates Mool since he knows that he is not the son of John Caldwell, but the child of a rapist.

== Cast ==
- Leonard Mann as Chuck Mool
- Woody Strode as Woody
- Peter Martell as Silver
- Helmuth Schneider as Joe Caldwell
- George Eastman as "Hondo"
- Ida Galli as Sheila
- Alain Naya as Alan Caldwell
- Dino Strano as Sam
- Andrea Aureli as Santiago
- Enzo Fiermonte as Sheriff
- Giuseppe Lauricella as Udo
- Romano Puppo as Burt
- Lucio Rosato as Tom Udo
- Luciano Rossi as Fair Poker Player
- Giovanni Cianfriglia as Saloon Brawler
- Claudio Scarchilli as Saloon Brawler

== Releases ==
Wild East Productions released this on a limited edition DVD in 2007 with The Forgotten Pistolero.
