= Sergio Lombardo =

Italian artist (born 1939)

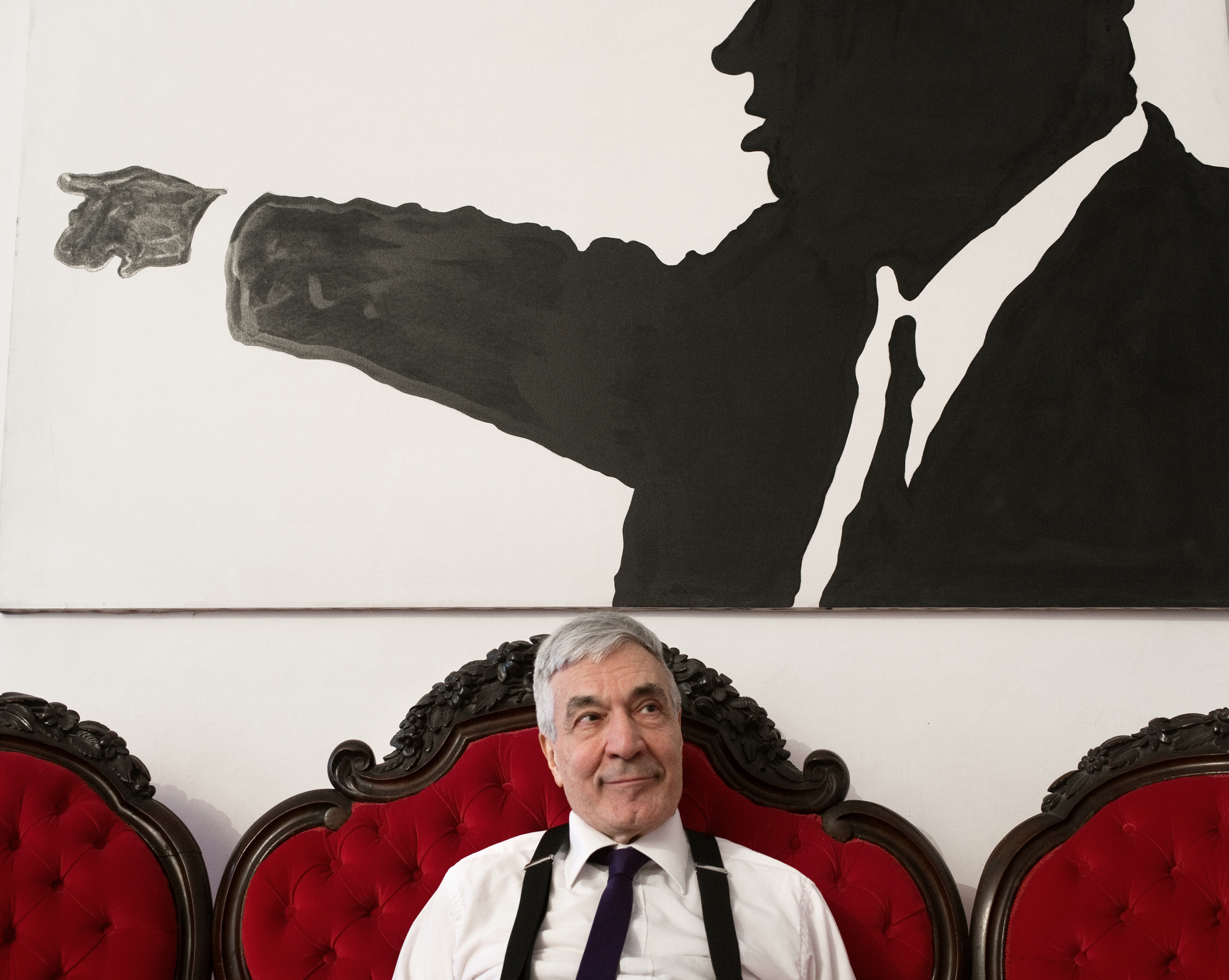
- 2011
- Born: December 1, 1939 (age 86); Rome
- Occupation: artist

Sergio Lombardo (Rome, 1 December 1939) is an Italian artist known for his role in Typical Gestures series and the creation of Supercomponibili.

== Biography ==
He began his artistic journey at a very young age, specifically at the end of the 1950s; creating his first monochrome works, pieces of paper glued on canvas and painted with enamel layers. He made his debut in a group exhibition in 1958 at the Premio Cinecittà in Rome, where he met Francesco Lo Savio, Mario Schifano, Renato Mambor, Cesare Tacchi, and Tano Festa.

In 1961, Lombardo began creating the Typical Gestures series, initially painting in black and white and later in color, in a size larger than real life, some of the most important political figures of the time, highlighting their emblematic and evocative characteristics. During this artistic period, he joined the Piazza del Popolo School group, an artistic movement that included artists such as Mario Schifano, Jannis Kounellis, Tano Festa, Franco Angeli, Renato Mambor, Cesare Tacchi, who gathered in Rome around Caffè Rosati and the La Tartaruga gallery of Plinio de Martiis. In 1963, he exhibited at La Tartaruga Gallery with Renato Mambor and Cesare Tacchi, while in 1964 he participated in the collective exhibition Eight young Roman painters.

From the mid-sixties, he created the Supercomponibili series, which in 1968 he presented at the La Salita gallery in Rome and at the Salone Annunciata in Milan. These years marked a strong participation abroad in thematic reviews and group exhibitions, including in 1967 at the National Museum of Modern Art in Tokyo, in 1968 at the Jewish Museum in New York, and in 1969 at the Centre Georges Pompidou in Paris.

In 1970 at the 35th International Art Exhibition, the Venice Biennale he exhibited Sphere with Mermaid, an environmental work composed of seven spheres that emitted an alarm siren sound at the slightest movement.

From the eighties, he developed Stochastic painting, automatic procedures of artistic creation. He exhibited in numerous shows including the solo exhibition in 2004 at the Mudima Foundation in Milan and in 2011 at the collective Italian Masterpieces a look at the twentieth century at the Museum of Modern and Contemporary Art of Trento and Rovereto. In the '80s, he taught at the Academy of Fine Arts in Frosinone.

== Bibliography ==
- Rome Sixties, Silvana Editorial
- "Sergio Lombardo", Texts by Maurizio Calvesi, Miriam Mirolla, edited by Miriam Mirolla, April 5-May 6, 1995, Museum Laboratory of Contemporary Art, University of Rome "La Sapienza".
- "Art of the Twentieth Century 1945-2001", M.Mirolla, G.Zucconi, edited by R.Scrimieri, Mondadori University, Milan, 2001.
- "Psychology and Art of the Event. Eventualist History 1977-2003", edited by Paola Ferraris, Gangemi Publisher, Rome, 2003.
- "Sergio Lombardo. Three pictorial series from 1958 to today", Texts by Sergio Lombardo, Miriam Mirolla, edited by Miriam Mirolla, Secret Cards Editions, Rome, 2007.
- The School of Piazza del Popolo, by Andrea Tugnoli
- Sergio Lombardo, by Andrea Tugnoli, Christian Maretti Publisher 2009, ISBN 978-88-89965-61-0.
