= Deadly Trackers =

1972 Italian film

- Directed by: Tanio Boccia
- Written by: Tanio Boccia
- Produced by: Giovanni Vari
- Starring: Richard Harrison; Anita Ekberg
- Cinematography: Romolo Garroni
- Edited by: Fedora Zincone
- Music by: Carlo Esposito
- Release date: 1972
- Country: Italy

Deadly Trackers (Italian: La lunga cavalcata della vendetta, lit. 'The long ride of vengeance') is a 1972 Italian Spaghetti Western film co-produced, co-written and directed by Tanio Boccia under the pseudonym Amerigo Anton. It stars Richard Harrison and Anita Ekberg.

== Cast ==
- Richard Harrison as Jeff Carter
- Anita Ekberg as Jane
- Rik Battaglia as Montana
- Emilio Vale as Carlos Armendariz
- George Wang as Cliff
- Furio Meniconi as Tommy
- Dada Gallotti as Deborah, Jeff's sister
- Omero Gargano as Jerome
- Lorenzo Piani as Colton
- Attilio Dottesio as Drummond

== Production ==
The film was produced by European United Pictures. It was shot at the De Laurentiis Studios in Rome. Its plot is largely based on Anthony Dawson's Vengeance, including large chunks of its original dialogue. It is the penultimate film of Boccia, and his last western.

== Reception ==
Italian critic Davide Pulici considered the film as very ordinary in terms of story, but praised its flashback structure, deemed as very original for the time. Marco Giusti called the film 'very confusing'. Paolo Mereghetti described it as a very predictable revenge story, with 'interminable horseback-riding scenes and mild bursts of Grand Guignol'.
