= Behind Closed Doors (1961 film) =

1961 film

Behind Closed Doors A porte chiuse
- Directed by: Dino Risi
- Produced by: Mario Cecchi Gori
- Cinematography: Mario Montuori
- Music by: Piero Umiliani
- Release date: 1961
- Running time: 100 minutes
- Country: Italy
- Language: Italian

A porte chiuse (internationally released as Behind Closed Doors) is a 1961 Italian comedy film directed by Dino Risi.

== Cast ==
- Anita Ekberg as Olga Duvovich
- Fred Clark as Xatis Attorney General
- Ettore Manni as Sailor
- Claudio Gora: President of the Court
- Gianni Bonagura as Defense Lawyer
- Alberto Talegalli as Poseydon, Head of Jury
- Mario Scaccia as Manning
- Hélène Rémy as Marietta
- Béatrice Altariba as The Bride
- Vittorio Caprioli as Commissioner
