= Cattive ragazze =

- Directed by: Marina Ripa Di Meana
- Written by: Marina Ripa di Meana
- Produced by: Alberto Tarallo; Achille Manzotti
- Starring: Eva Grimaldi; Brando Giorgi; Anita Ekberg; Burt Young
- Distributed by: Artisti Associati
- Release date: 15 August 1992
- Running time: 99 minutes
- Country: Italy
- Language: Italian

Cattive ragazze (translated: Bad Girls) is a 1992 film directed by Marina Ripa Di Meana in her directorial debut. It was produced by Alberto Tarallo and Achille Manzotti and starred Eva Grimaldi, Brando Giorgi, Burt Young and Anita Ekberg. The film was released on the Italian cinema circuit on August 15, 1992. Eva Grimaldi stars as a recently divorced woman falling in love with a male stripper. The film received negative reviews from both critics and the public and bombed at the box office, and is sometimes considered one of the worst Italian films ever made. The production received bad publicity, as it was made using money from the country's Ministry of Cultural Heritage and Activities under Article 28.

== Plot ==
Alma has recently divorced, a situation that has plunged her into deep depression. While celebrating her twenty-fifth birthday alone, she receives a knock at the door: it is Brian, a male stripper sent as a birthday gift by two colleagues trying to cheer her up. Just as Brian begins his striptease, Milli—Alma's mentally unstable former mother-in-law—bursts in and creates a scene, accusing her ex-daughter-in-law of ruining her son's reputation by leaving him and filing for divorce. Milli's son—Alma's ex-husband—turns out to be a spineless man entirely dominated by his mother's aggressive views. Faced with this situation, Alma and Brian decide to flee to Venezuela on his Harley-Davidson.

Thus begins an adventure for the two lovers. Both need to leave the city immediately to escape dangerous, deranged individuals threatening their safety: Alma is menaced by Milli, while Brian is pursued by his ex-girlfriend Marylin—a thief and aspiring hitwoman recently released from prison alongside her accomplice Amy, a lesbian dwarf. The pair take refuge with Esmeralda—Brian’s sister and a former soap opera star who harbors incestuous desires for her brother. Meanwhile, Amy commits suicide after Marylin insults her, unleashing a torrent of vitriol and rejection upon her.

Marylin secures a stash of diamonds she had stolen with Amy and sets out to find Brian. Elsewhere, while searching for Alma, Milli is involved in a car accident with her son—Alma’s ex-husband—who dies in the crash; Milli survives and, upon reaching a truckload of nuns nearby, is taken in by them. Battered from the accident, Milli claims her husband beat her because she does not support the same soccer team as he does. The nuns believe her lie and, moved by compassion, come to her aid before driving her to her requested destination. After a series of chases and shootouts, the story reaches a tragic conclusion.

Alma and Brian take refuge in a top-floor hotel room, but Marylin manages to track the lovers down. She sneaks into their room and, seized by a fit of jealous rage, declares she is still in love with Brian; she then proceeds to savagely beat Alma, while Brian—chained to the bed where he had moments earlier initiated a sadomasochistic game with Alma—watches the fight between the two women, helpless to intervene. As the rivals brawl, the room is shaken by gunshots fired by Milli; accompanied by the nuns, she has arrived at the hotel and kills Brian.

By killing Brian, Milli finally avenges the honor of her son, who had died in the interim. Realizing Brian is dead, Alma and Marylin scream in despair; Marylin, in particular, rushes toward Milli, attempting to kill her. During the struggle, the two women crash through the room's glass wall and plummet, smashing into the ground below. Shaken by these events and the death of the man she loved, Alma completely loses her grip on reality. Widowed by her ex-husband and now without Brian, she returns to work, though she is distant and changed. In the aftermath, she discovers a new side of herself and emerges as a strong, determined woman. This transformation allows her to break free from her depression and find liberation through casual sexual encounters with handsome, willing men—though perhaps she is merely seeking the presence of her one true love, Brian, in these other men.

== Cast ==
- Eva Grimaldi as Alma Denver
- Brando Giorgi as Brian
- Florence Guérin as Marilyn
- Pier Maria Cecchini as Filippo
- Debbie Lee Carrington as Amy
- Burt Young as Leo Hurricane
- Kid Creole as Elliott
- Anita Ekberg as Milli
- Cornelia Grindatto as Denise
- Apollonia Kotero as Esmeralda
- Piero Piccioni

== Production ==
Ripa di Meana’s first foray into cinema came in 1979, when she landed the lead role in the film Assassinio sul Tevere. Subsequently, two films were made based on her best-selling books: I miei primi 40 anni, directed by Carlo Vanzina, and La più bella del reame, directed by Cesare Ferrario in 1989. Following these films, Ripa di Meana wrote the screenplay for Cattive ragazze, a film dealing with feminism.

The cast was also composed primarily of women, including Eva Grimaldi, Florence Guérin, and Anita Ekberg. The film marked several debuts: Ripa di Meana behind the camera, Eva Grimaldi in her first dramatic acting role, and actor Brando Giorgi. Reflecting on the experience, Ripa di Meana said, "Shooting this film was a stimulating, albeit very exhausting, experience." Filming began on September 30, 1991, and editing was completed towards the end of March. The film was shot in Venezuela and Mexico City to keep production costs down. The budget allocated for the film's production was 2.35 billion lire.

To promote the film, two short trailers were produced: in the first, Ripa di Meana appeared—brandishing a pair of scissors—after a few clips from the movie, while in the second, she presented the film alongside actress Debbie Lee Carrington. The soundtrack featured vocals by Donatella Rettore, with music and lyrics by Claudio Rego and M.T. Brill. The song in question, titled "Bad Girl," plays during the end credits but was never officially released.

== Release ==
The film was released in Italian cinemas on August 15, 1992. The film was released on VHS by Manzotti Home Video, although the original VHS remains difficult to find today.

=== Censorship ===
The film received censorship approval on March 25, 1992, under permit no. 87596.

== Reception ==
=== Box office ===
The film was a box-office flop, and its earnings failed to cover production costs. Following its theatrical release, the film grossed 24,887,000 lire in its first week and a total of 29,967,000 lire. It was screened for only a few days around Ferragosto (mid-August), drawing an audience of 2,701 during that period. On two occasions, Corriere della Sera reported that audience members were leaving the theater before the film ended and that, following the review, indignant and appalled readers phoned the editorial office. By the end of the year, the film failed to make the list of the 100 most-watched films of the 1992–1993 season. In 1993, the film was cited in an article in La Repubblica as one of the year's major cinematic failures, alongside *Jackpot*, a film written by and starring Adriano Celentano. Following the film's failure, Ripa di Meana maintained that it "did poorly because it was demonized from day one. [...] Everyone pounced on me because I had secured the funding".

=== Critical ===
The film is considered by some to be one of the worst films ever made. Paolo Mereghetti in his film encyclopaedia Dizionario dei Film described the film as a "vapid mess that can only serve those incapable of understanding what cinema is", and considered it able to "compete for the title of worst film in cinema history and win!" G. Giraud wrote in Il Lavoro, that Cattive ragazze "does not resemble anything in a real movie, or even recall anything previously seen at the cinema, even in its worst". Film critic Marco Giusti referred to the film as "one of the pillars of Italian trash cinema". Wired Italia placed it on its list of the 10 worst films ever made. Renato Venturelli, while reviewing Goodbye Mama, recalled Cattive ragazze as one of the "duds produced by the 'well-connected' elite."

Meana defended herself from critics, claiming that it was never her intention to create a second Battleship Potemkin. Following the letter, Ripa di Meana responded to the criticism by maintaining that "I don't think it was a bad film, and in any case, there are worse ones" and further declared that she would win an Oscar within five years. Cattive ragazze was Di Meana's directorial debut, she never directed another film.

== See also ==
- List of films considered the worst
