= The Dam on the Yellow River =

- Directed by: Renzo Merusi
- Starring: Anita Ekberg
- Cinematography: Enzo Serafin
- Music by: Guido Robuschi; Gian Stellari
- Release date: 1960
- Running time: 95 minutes
- Countries: Italy; France
- Language: Italian

The Dam on the Yellow River (Italian: Apocalisse sul fiume giallo, French: Le dernier train de Shanghai, released in UK as Last Train to Shanghai) is a 1960 Italian-French drama film written and directed by Renzo Merusi.

== Plot ==
In China, during the civil war, Mao Tse Tung overrides the retreating nationalists. The rebels decide, at the cost of causing millions of victims, to blow up the dam on the Yellow River.

== Cast ==
- Anita Ekberg: Miss Dorothy Simmons
- Georges Marchal: John Bell
- Franca Bettoia: Sister Celeste
- George Wang: Wang (credited as Wang Jie)
- José Jaspe: Slansky
- Dori Dorika: Mamie
- Claudio Biava: Anak, Wang's Partner
- Miranda Campa: Mary
- Fanfulla
- Liana Del Balzo
