= George Wang (actor) =

Taiwanese actor and producer (1918-2015)

- 王玨
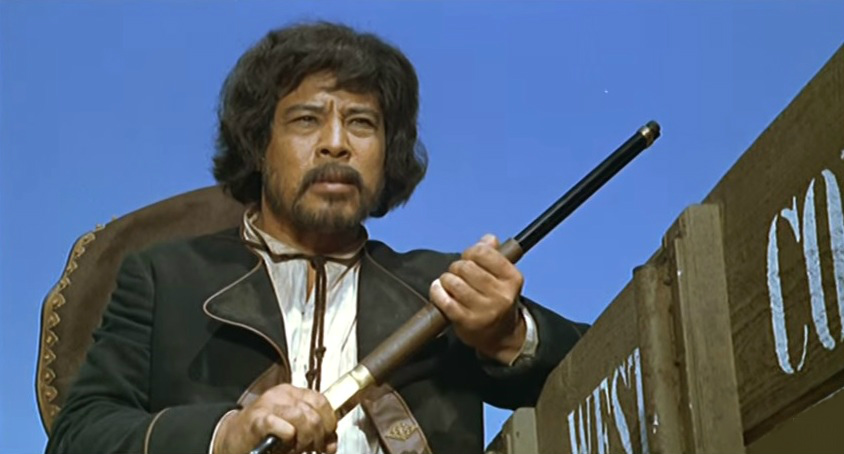
- Wang in Colt in the Hand of the Devil (1967)
- Born: Wang Chun-yang; November 12, 1918; Dandong, Liaoning, Republic of China (present-day People's Republic of China)
- Died: March 27, 2015 (aged 96); Taipei, Taiwan
- Other names: Wang Jie; Giorgio Wang; George Wang Chueh
- Occupations: Actor; Producer
- Years active: 1938–2010

Chinese name
- Traditional Chinese: 王玨
- Simplified Chinese: 王玨
Transcriptions
Standard Mandarin
- Hanyu Pinyin: Wáng Jué
Yue: Cantonese
- Jyutping: Wong4 Gok3

Wang Chun-yang
- Traditional Chinese: 王春陽
- Simplified Chinese: 王春阳
Transcriptions
Standard Mandarin
- Hanyu Pinyin: Wáng Chūnyáng
Yue: Cantonese
- Jyutping: Wong4 Ceon1 Joeng4

George Wang Jie (Chinese: 王玨; pinyin: Wáng Jué, born Wang Chun-yang Chinese: 王春陽; pinyin: Wáng Chūnyáng, 12 November 1918 – 27 March 2015) was a Taiwanese actor and film producer. After a beginning his career in Mainland China during the Republican era, he was an important figure in the early development of Taiwanese and Hong Kong cinema, but came to the attention of international audiences for his appearances in a multitude of Italian films during the 1960s and 1970s.

== Early life ==
Born Wang Chun-yang (Chinese: 王春陽; pinyin: Wáng Chūnyáng) in Dandong, Liaoning Province, Republic of China in 1918. He enrolled in Northeastern University, where he studied economics and history, but the outbreak of the Second Sino-Japanese War saw him abandon his studies to join Zou Taofen's National Salvation Front, adopting the nom de guerre Wang Jie (Chinese: 王玨; pinyin: Wáng Jué), which he later used as his Chinese stage name.

== Career ==
In 1938, he enrolled in the China Film Studio's drama school in Shanghai, and the following year he made his film debut in Defending Our Homeland (保家鄉, Bǎo jiāxiāng). He moved to Chongqing, where he worked as a stage and film actor, and an anti-Japanese propagandist. He returned to Shanghai in 1947, during the Chinese Civil War. When the war made remaining in mainland China untenable, Wang led the withdrawal of most his studio's personnel and equipment to Taiwan, in 1949. He subsequently became one of the most important stars in the early years of Taiwanese cinema, and was eventually promoted to head of technical production at China Film Studio.

In 1959, Wang went to Italy to appear in the international co-production The Dam on the Yellow River. He enjoyed the experience so much that he chose to stay in Italy to work in its burgeoning film industry, adopting the Western name George Wang (sometimes 'Giorgio Wang').

He was a very active character actor in genre films, mainly spy films, adventure films and Spaghetti Westerns, being mostly cast in roles of villains. Thanks to his good knowledge of English, he was also active in a number of English language productions, notably appearing in Nicholas Ray's 55 Days at Peking. After portraying Machete, a Mexican antagonist in the 1967 film Per il gusto di uccidere, Wang claimed that he was the first Asian actor to play a non-Asian role in a non-Asian country. He also worked as a local representative for Shaw Brothers Studio.

In 1976 Wang moved to Hong Kong, where with his son Don he founded the "Wang Film Company". In 1978 he returned to Taiwan and back to acting, winning in 1981 a Golden Horse Award for Best Supporting Actor for his performance in The Coldest Winter in Peking (皇天后土). He was a member of the Golden Horse Film Festival's jury in 1984, 1996, and 1998. He continued regularly appearing in films and television series until his nineties, with his final film role in 2010. In 2000, he received a Golden Horse Lifetime Achievement Award.

== Personal life ==
Wang was married twice. He had several children, including actor Don Wong Tao. He was a Roman Catholic.

== Death ==
Wang died on 27 March 2015 of heart attack at 96 years old, and he was buried thirteen days after. He received a posthumous citation by President Ma Ying-jeou in recognition of his contributions to Taiwanese cinema.

== Partial filmography ==
- E meng chu xing (1951) as Luo Ping
- The Dam on the Yellow River (1960) as Wang (as Wang Jie)
- Mi yue feng bo (1960) as Chin CHun-Hsiung
- The Mongols (1961) as Subodai
- 55 Days at Peking (1963) as Boxer Chief (uncredited)
- The Pirates of Malaysia (1964) as Sho Pa
- 008: Operation Exterminate (1965) as Tanaka
- Spy in Your Eye (1965) as Ming
- The 10th Victim (1965) as Chinese hunter
- James Tont operazione U.N.O. (1965) as Kayo
- The Almost Perfect Crime (1966) as Chinese Driver
- Dr. Goldfoot and the Girl Bombs (1966) as Fong (uncredited)
- Taste for Killing (1966) as Ming
- Black Box Affair (1966) as Chinese agent
- Mi vedrai tornare (1966) as Prince Hiro Toyo
- El Cisco (1966) as Capobanda
- Colt in the Hand of the Devil (1967) as El Condor / Capataz
- Scorpions and Miniskirts (1967) as Dr. Kung
- Your Turn to Die (1967) as Chang
- Tepepa (1969) as Mr. Chu
- 36 Hours to Hell (1969) as Major Koshiro
- Have a Good Funeral, My Friend... Sartana Will Pay (1970) as Lee Tse Tung / Peng
- Kill Django... Kill First (1971) as Martinez
- Desert of Fire (1971) as El Marish
- Roma Bene (1971) as Che Fang (uncredited)
- Two Brothers in Trinity (1971) as Chinaman
- La tecnica e il rito (1972, TV Movie) as Hun
- Deadly Trackers (1972) as Ling Fu
- Sotto a chi tocca! (1972) as Koyo the Balls Thrower
- Even Angels Eat Beans (1973) as Naka Kata (uncredited)
- The Big Game (1973) as Wong
- The Executioner of God (1973) as Ramon Orea
- Super Fly T.N.T. (1973) as Poker Player #1
- Studio legale per una rapina (1973) as Lino
- They Were Called Three Musketeers ... But They Were Four (1973) as Kungfu Master
- Mr. Hercules Against Karate (1973) as Ming
- Seven Hours of Violence (1973) as a Chinese Thug
- The Fighting Fist of Shanghai Joe (1973) as Master Yang
- Man with the Golden Winchester (1973) as Pedro Garincha
- Six Bounty Hunters for a Massacre (1973) as Ming / Messinas
- Milarepa (1974)
- This Time I'll Make You Rich (1974) as Wang
- Il Sergente Rompiglioni diventa... caporale (1975) as Chang
- Nan quan bei tui zhan yan wang (1977) as Mayor Yuen
- Yuan (1980)
- The Battle for the Republic of China (1981)
- The Coldest Winter in Peking (1981)
- Jing hun feng yu ye (1982)
- I Shall Return (1982)
- Yan wang de xi yan (1982)
- Zui chang de yi ye (1983)
- Hei bai zhu (1983)
- Da Niu Yue hua bu feng yun (1985)
- Ri nei wa de huang hun (1986)
- Eat Drink Man Woman (1994)
- Born to Be King (2000)
- Jin zai zhi chi (2010) as Ta-Chieh's Grandfather
- The Grandmaster (2013) as Third Elder (final film role)
