= The Cobra (film) =

- Directed by: Mario Sequi
- Written by: Adriano Bolzoni; Gumersindo Mollo
- Starring: Dana Andrews; Peter Martell; Anita Ekberg
- Cinematography: Claudio Racca
- Music by: Antón García Abril
- Release date: 1967
- Language: Italian

The Cobra (Italian: Il cobra, Spanish: El cobra, also known as Cobra and Female Cobra) is a 1967 Italian-Spanish crime film directed by Mario Sequi.

== Plot ==
US intelligence comes in action to discover powerful organization in drug trafficking active in the Mediterranean.

== Cast ==
- Dana Andrews: Capt. Kelly
- Peter Martell: Mike Rand
- Elisa Montés: Corinne
- Anita Ekberg: Lou
- Jesús Puente: Stiarkos
- Peter Dane: Hullinger
- Luciana Vincenzi: Ulla
- George Eastman: Crane
- Omar Zolficar: Sadek
- Giovanni Petrucci: King
- Guido Lollobrigida: Killer
- Conrado San Martín
