= Lady Dracula =

- Directed by: Franz Josef Gottlieb
- Written by: Brad Harris; Redis Reda
- Starring: Evelyne Kraft; Brad Harris; Theo Lingen
- Cinematography: Fritz Baader; Ernst W. Kalinke
- Edited by: Gisela Haller
- Music by: Horst Jankowski
- Production company: IFV Produktion
- Release date: 16 March 1977
- Running time: 79 minutes
- Country: West Germany
- Language: German

Lady Dracula is a 1977 West German comedy horror film, directed by Franz Josef Gottlieb and starring Evelyne Kraft, Brad Harris, and Theo Lingen in his final film appearance.

The film is initially set in 1876, when Count Dracula kidnaps and bites an adolescent countess. Dracula is killed shortly after, and the girl is sealed in her tomb before having a chance to turn into a vampire. In 1976, she is accidentally released from her tomb and quickly changes into an adult form. The vampiress has to adapt to the changes in her life, while also working for a living. An inspector investigating a series of vampire murders quickly falls in love with the attractive vampire woman.

== Plot summary ==
In Austria-Hungary, 1876, Count Dracula emerges from his castle and raids a girl boarding school, kidnapping the young Countess Barbara von Weidenborn. A posse pursues him, but Dracula is able to bite Barbara and drain her blood before he is cornered and staked inside his tomb. Unwilling to defile Barbara's corpse, the citizens bury her in a coffin sealed with a cross to prevent her from rising as a vampire herself.

In 1976, a hundred years later, two construction workers accidentally unearth Barbara's coffin, and one of them steals the cross to trade it for a drink of beer before they report their find to the police. In the meantime, however, the coffin is stolen and sold to an unscrupulous antique dealer. Barbara emerges the following night and kills the dealer; but after having consumed his blood, she turns into a beautiful adult woman.

Barbara eventually finds employment with Theo Marmorstein, an undertaker, where she secretly drains the corpses of their blood for later consumption. However, during a carnival party, her supply of blood runs out (mostly thanks to Marmorstein's bumbling assistants), and in her thirst she attacks and drains Irene Ruhesanft, Marmorstein's love interest. When Marmorstein catches her in the act, she moves to attack him as well; Marmorstein accidentally knocks over a bunch of chemicals which set the building ablaze, forcing Barbara to flee and sustain herself on blood banks and the occasional human victim.

The vampire murders are investigated by Austrian police Inspector Harris and his assistant Eddi. They encounter Barbara while she is still working for Marmorstein, and while Harris falls in love with her, Eddi gradually begins to suspect that the murderer is a vampire, which Harris dismisses.

After the undertaker's firm has burned down, Harris is delighted to find Barbara still alive, but as they spend one evening together, she attacks and tries to drain him. The imminent sunrise forces her to retreat to her coffin stored inside a secret room within her apartment; when Harris incautiously follows her and bends over the coffin, she pulls him inside and the lid falls shut. When Eddi, after having deduced that Barbara is the vampire, arrives right afterwards and comes upon the shaking coffin, he ends the film by nervously asking the audience: "I wonder if I should disturb them now?"

== Cast ==
- Evelyne Kraft as Countess Barbara von Weidenborn / Lady Dracula
- Marion Kracht as Young Barbara
- Brad Harris as Police Inspector Harris
- Theo Lingen as Theo Marmorstein
- Eddi Arent as Detective Eddi
- Christine Buchegger as Irene Ruhesanft
- Walter Giller as Mr. Oskar
- Klaus Höhne as Mr. Hubert
- Roberto Blanco as Karli
- Stephen Boyd as Count Dracula

== Production ==
It was shot in 1975 on location in Vienna, but the release was delayed to 1977.

== Bibliography ==
- John L. Flynn. Cinematic vampires: the living dead on film and television, from The devil's castle (1896) to Bram Stoker's Dracula (1992). McFarland & Co., 1992.
