= The Mighty Peking Man =

1977 Hong Kong film by Ho Meng-hua

- Theatrical release poster

Chinese name
- Traditional Chinese: 猩猩王
- Literal meaning: Gorilla King
Transcriptions
Standard Mandarin
- Hanyu Pinyin: Xīngxing Wáng
- Directed by: Ho Meng-hua
- Written by: Ni Kuang
- Produced by: Runme Shaw
- Starring: Danny Lee; Evelyne Kraft; Hsiao Yao; Ku Feng; Lin Wei-tu
- Cinematography: Tsao Hui-chi; Wu Cho-hua
- Edited by: Chiang Hsing-Lung; Pepita Fairfax; Thom Noble
- Music by: Frankie Chan (Note: Includes source music from the De Wolfe library.)
- Production company: Shaw Brothers Studio
- Distributed by: Shaw Brothers Studio
- Release date: 11 August 1977 (HK)
- Running time: 90 minutes
- Country: Hong Kong
- Language: Mandarin
- Budget: HKD 6,000,000-$1,000,000 USD)(estimated)

The Mighty Peking Man (Chinese: 猩猩王), as known as Goliathon in the United States, is a 1977 Hong Kong monster film directed by Ho Meng-hua and starring Danny Lee, Evelyne Kraft and Ku Feng. It was produced by Shaw Brothers Studio to capitalize on the craze surrounding the 1976 remake of King Kong.

It was released in Hong Kong on August 11, 1977.

== Plot ==
A mysterious giant ape has appeared in the forests of northern India after a massive earthquake. The owner of a Hong Kong entertainment company, Lu Tien, is interested in capturing the ape for use in a global commercial show, or to make a taxidermy of it, which would be worth a fortune. At the same time, a young explorer, Chen Zhengfeng, also wants to go to India. Tien learns that he is more familiar with the road and invites him to cooperate with him. He will be responsible for the cost of the trip, but the ape belongs to him after the capture, so Zhengfeng eventually refuses to cooperate with him. At that time, Zhengfeng is in love with the diva Wang Cuihua. Chen Zhengfeng's younger brother, Shiyu, is a popular songwriter and a womanizer. In order to get a song written by him and become famous, Cuihua offers herself to Shiyu. Inspired by this, Zhengfeng agrees to Tien’s offer and teams up to go to India.

Under the guidance of a local guide, the expedition team is led through the forest, which is deserted, and climbs up cliffs and through lakes and swamps, where they are attacked by elephants, tigers and poisonous snakes. When the unconscious Zhengfeng is attacked by the ape, a beautiful wild girl named Ah-wei intervenes. It turns out that the girl's parents were originally explorers, but their parents were killed in a storm while exploring in a small plane, leaving behind 4-year-old Ah-wei, who was rescued and raised by the ape whom she named Ah-wang (“Utam” in the English dub). Ah-wei gradually grows up, and has fun with the forest animals, such as cheetahs and elephants, together.

Zhengfeng and Ah-wei fall in love with each other and become good friends with Ah-wang. Zhengfeng decides to take them back to the civilized world, but he falls into a trap set by Tien and is forced to lock Ah-wang on a boat, which sails back to Hong Kong across the Indian Ocean. When Ah-wei sees Ah-wang being humiliated, she is upset and sees Cuihua crying in Zhengfeng's arms, so she turns around and escapes. Ah-wang performs at a stadium in Hong Kong under the arrangement of Tien. Ah-wei rushes to the stadium and throws herself into Ah-wang’s arms with tears in her eyes. When Tien tries to rape Ah-wei, Utam witnesses through the window and breaks free from his shackles in anger, and Tien flees in a panic. The angry Ah-wang wreaks havoc and climbs up Hong Kong's tallest building, the Connaught Centre. The army mobilizes helicopters and armored vehicles to kill Ah-wang before Zhengfeng and Ah-wei can stop his rampage first.

== Cast ==
Cast adapted from Shaw Brothers Volume 1 box set.

- Danny Lee as Chen Zhengfeng
- Evelyne Kraft as Ah-wei
- Hsiao Yao as Wang Cuihua
- Ku Feng as Lu Tien
- Lin Wei-tu as Chen Shiyu
- Norman Chu as Ah Long
- Wu Hang-sheng as Ah Pi
- Chen Ping as Lucy
- Ted Thomas as The Commissioner
- Steve Nicholson as Commissioner's aide
- Keizō Murase as Utam

== Production ==
The Mighty Peking Man had a budget of six million Hong Kong dollars for the Shaw Bros. studio. The film took over a year to complete and was shot in Mysore, India. The climactic confrontation scene was shot at the Connaught Centre in Hong Kong, which was then the tallest building in the country.

== Release ==
Mighty Peking Man was released on August 11, 1977 in Hong Kong where it was distributed by Shaw Bros. It was released as Goliathon in its release in the United States in 1980.

Mighty Peking Man was one of the two Hong Kong films released by Rolling Thunder Pictures in 1999, along with Chungking Express. The film grossed $17,368 on its 1999 North American theatrical re-release.

== Reception ==
Variety reviewed a 100-minute long Cantonese-language version of the film stating it was an "interesting if not unique Hongkong-made escapist entertainment for the inquisitive middle-of-the-roaders audience of other countries." and "it is high camp, Chinese style and for this reason it just might make it in less demanding markets."

In retrospective reviews, Roger Ebert gave the film three stars out of a possible four in the Chicago Sun-Times, and, incidentally, actually upgraded his rating for the thematically similar Infra-Man:

"Mighty Peking Man is very funny, although a shade off the high mark of Infra-Man, which was made a year earlier, and is my favourite Hong Kong monster film. Both were produced by the legendary Runme Shaw, who, having tasted greatness, obviously hoped to repeat. I find to my astonishment that I gave Infra-Man only two and a half stars when I reviewed it. That was 22 years ago, but a fellow will remember a lot of things you wouldn't think he'd remember. I'll bet a month hasn't gone by since that I haven't thought of that film. I am awarding Mighty Peking Man three stars, for general goofiness and a certain level of insane genius, but I cannot in good conscience rate it higher than Infra-Man. So, in answer to those correspondents who ask if I have ever changed a rating on a movie: Yes, Infra-Man moves up to three stars.

== Footnotes ==
=== References ===
- Willis, Donald, ed. (1985). Variety's Complete Science Fiction Reviews. Garland Publishing Inc. ISBN 978-0-8240-6263-7.
