= The Silkworm (film) =

- Directed by: Mario Sequi
- Written by: Mino Roli
- Produced by: Antonio Gentile; Giuliano Giunti; Massimo Manasse
- Starring: Nadja Tiller; George Hilton; Riccardo Garrone
- Cinematography: Alvaro Lanzoni
- Edited by: Maurizio Mangosi
- Music by: Mario Bertolazzi
- Production company: Grado Film
- Release date: 1973
- Running time: 90 minutes
- Country: Italy
- Language: Italian

The Silkworm (Italian: Il baco da seta) is a 1973 Italian thriller film directed by Mario Sequi and starring Nadja Tiller, George Hilton and Riccardo Garrone.

It was shot at the Tirrenia Studios and on location in Livorno and Florence. The film's sets were designed by the art director Elio Balletti.

== Cast ==
- Nadja Tiller as Smeralda Amadier
- George Hilton as Didier
- Riccardo Garrone as Commissario Guarnieri
- Guy Madison as Robert
- Evi Marandi as Yvonne
- Evi Rigano as Marcelle
- Mario Feliciani as Avv. Planget
- Osvaldo Ruggieri as Raffaele
- Carlos de Castro as Anastasios Kuskas
- Vivi Gioi as Costa's ex lover
- Max Morris as the janitor

== Bibliography ==
- Vito Zagarrio. Argento vivo: il cinema di Dario Argento tra genere e autorialità. Marsilio, 2008.
