= David Lowell Rich =

American film director (1920–2001)

- Born: August 31, 1920; New York City, U.S.
- Died: October 21, 2001 (aged 81); Raleigh, North Carolina, U.S.
- Occupations: Film director, film producer
- Years active: 1950–1987

David Lowell Rich (August 31, 1920 – October 21, 2001) was an American film director and producer. He directed nearly 100 films and TV episodes between 1950 and 1987. He was born in New York City. He began directing on a regular basis in 1950. Rich won an Emmy for outstanding direction of a special in 1978 for The Defection of Simas Kudirka. His brother was director John Rich.

== Selected filmography ==
Year	Title	Distributor	Notes
1959	Have Rocket, Will Travel	Columbia Pictures	
1964	See How They Run	NBC	Television film
1966	Madame X	Universal Pictures	
1966	The Plainsman	Universal Pictures	
1967	Rosie!	Universal Pictures	
1969	Eye of the Cat	Universal Pictures	
1972	Northeast of Seoul	Emerson Film Enterprises, Cannon Films	
1972	The Judge and Jake Wyler	NBC	Television film
1973	Satan's School for Girls	ABC	Television film
1973	Runaway!	ABC	Television film
1973	The Horror at 37,000 Feet	CBS	Television film
1977	SST: Death Flight	ABC	Television film
1978	A Family Upside Down	NBC	Television film
1978	Little Women	NBC	Television miniseries; 2 episodes
1979	The Concorde...Airport '79	Universal Pictures	
1981	Chu Chu and the Philly Flash	20th Century Fox	
1983	Thursday's Child	CBS	Television film
1986	Choices	ABC	Television film
1987	Infidelity	ABC	Television film
