= Anita Ekberg =

Swedish actress (1931–2015)

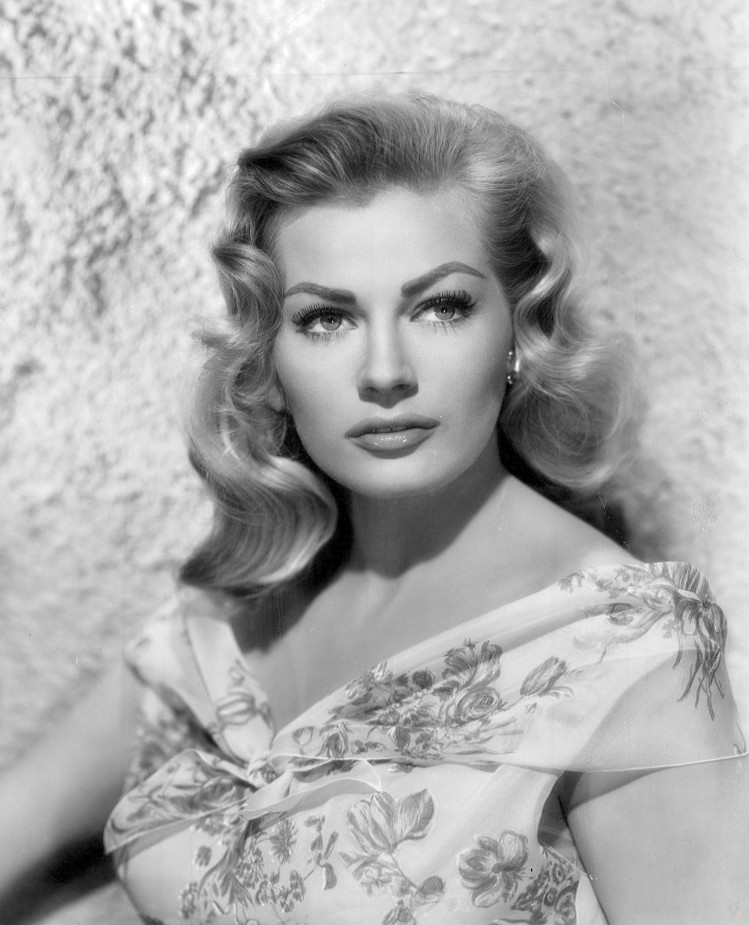
- Ekberg in 1956
- Born: Kerstin Anita Marianne Ekberg; 29 September 1931; Malmö, Sweden
- Died: 11 January 2015 (aged 83); Rocca di Papa, Italy
- Occupations: Actress; model
- Years active: 1947–2001
- Spouses: Anthony Steel (m. 1956; div. 1959) Rik Van Nutter (m. 1963; div. 1975)

Kerstin Anita Marianne Ekberg (Note: English pronunciation: /əˈniːtə ˈɛkbɜːrɡ/ ə-NEE-tə EK-burg; Swedish pronunciation: [aˈnîːta ˈêːkbærj]; Italian pronunciation: [aˈniːta ˈɛkberɡ].) (29 September 1931 – 11 January 2015) was a Swedish actress active in American and European films, known for her beauty and curvaceous figure. She became prominent in her iconic role as Sylvia in the Federico Fellini film La Dolce Vita (1960). Ekberg worked primarily in Italy, where she became a permanent resident in 1964.

== Early life ==
Anita Ekberg was born on 29 September 1931, in Malmö, Skåne (Sweden), the sixth of eight children. In her teens, Anita worked as a fashion model. Ekberg entered the Miss Malmö competition in 1950 at her mother's urging. This led to the Miss Sweden contest, awarded through a vote in the weekly magazine VeckoRevyn, which she won. Despite speaking very little English, she went to the United States to compete for the 1951 Miss Universe title (an unofficial beauty pageant at that time, it became official in 1952).

== Career ==
=== Universal Studios ===
Although Ekberg did not win the Miss Universe pageant, as one of six finalists, she did earn a starlet's contract with Universal Studios.

As a starlet at Universal, she received lessons in drama, elocution, dancing, horseback riding, and fencing. She appeared briefly in The Mississippi Gambler (1953) with Tyrone Power, Abbott and Costello Go to Mars (1953) (playing a woman on Venus), Take Me to Town (1953) with Ann Sheridan, and The Golden Blade (1953) with Rock Hudson and Piper Laurie.

Ekberg skipped many of her drama lessons, restricting herself to riding horses in the Hollywood Hills. Ekberg later admitted she was spoiled by the studio system and played, instead of pursuing bigger film roles. Universal dropped her after six months.

=== Batjac and Paramount ===
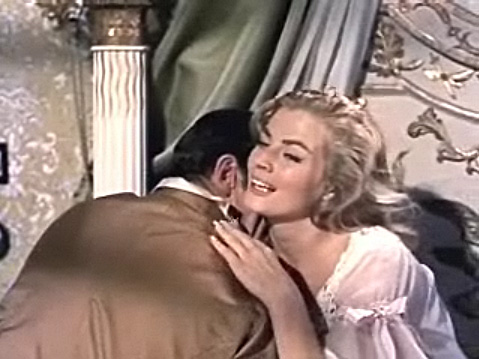
Ekberg in War and Peace (1956)

The combination of Ekberg's voluptuous physique and colourful private life (such as her well-publicized romances with Hollywood's leading men like Frank Sinatra, Tyrone Power, Yul Brynner, Rod Taylor, and Errol Flynn) appealed to the gossip magazines, like Confidential and she soon became a major 1950s pin-up, appearing in men's magazines like Playboy. Additionally, Ekberg participated in publicity stunts. She once admitted that an incident in which her dress burst open in the lobby of London's Berkeley Hotel was prearranged with a photographer.

Ekberg toured Greenland with Bob Hope, entertaining American servicemen. Hope spoke of her beauty and John Wayne signed her to a contract with his Batjac Productions at $75 a week.

By the mid-1950s, after several modelling jobs, Ekberg finally broke into the film industry. She guest-starred in the short-lived TV series Casablanca (1955) and Private Secretary.

She had a small part in the film Blood Alley (1955) starring John Wayne and Lauren Bacall, made for Wayne's Batjac Productions. It was her first real speaking role in a feature. She appeared alongside the Dean Martin and Jerry Lewis comedy act in Artists and Models (1955), directed by Frank Tashlin for Paramount, playing "Anita".

Ekberg's greatest opportunity was when Paramount cast her in War and Peace (1956) which was shot in Rome, alongside Mel Ferrer and Audrey Hepburn, directed by King Vidor. For a time, she was even publicised as "Paramount's Marilyn Monroe".

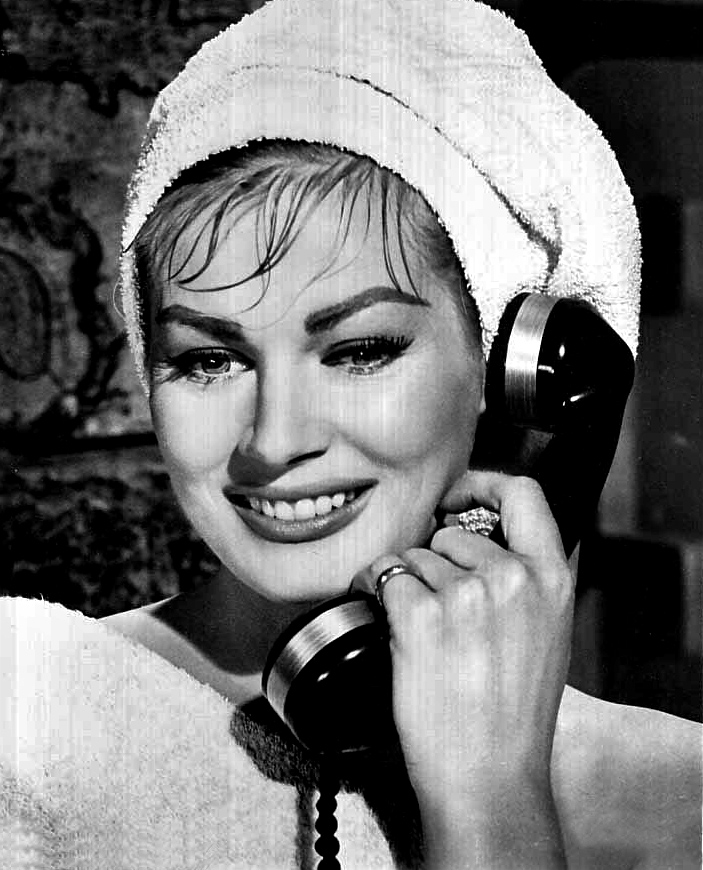
Ekberg in Hollywood or Bust (1956)

Ekberg was third billed in a thriller for Batjac, Man in the Vault (1956). It was distributed by RKO Pictures who had given Ekberg an excellent part in Back from Eternity (1956), directed by John Farrow.

Ekberg signed a deal with Warwick Pictures, the company of producers Albert Broccoli and Irwin Allen, who made films in England. She did Zarak (1956) with Victor Mature. Ekberg returned to Hollywood to make a second film with Martin and Lewis (and Tashlin), Hollywood or Bust (1956). Ekberg made a second film for Warwick with Mature, Interpol (1957). In 1956, Hedda Hopper said her fee was $75,000 per picture.

She was announced for Glare directed by Budd Boetticher, but it was not made.

When John Wayne split up with his producing partner Robert Fellows, Fellows took over Ekberg's contract.

=== Gerd Oswald ===
Ekberg returned to Hollywood to make Valerie (1957) with Sterling Hayden and her then-husband Anthony Steel for director Gerd Oswald. She co-starred with Bob Hope and Fernandel in Paris Holiday (1958). This film was also directed by Oswald, as was Screaming Mimi (1958). She did a third for Warwick, The Man Inside (1958) with Jack Palance. Another film was announced for her, entitled A Lot of Woman, but it was not made.

=== Italy and La Dolce Vita ===
Ekberg went to Italy to star in Sheba and the Gladiator (1959), playing Zenobia.

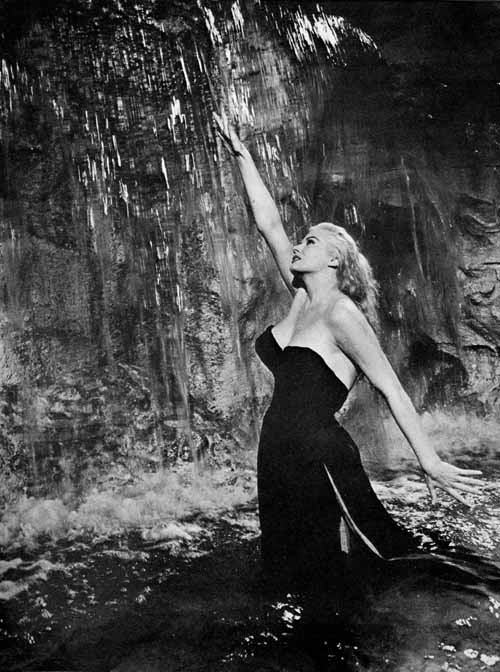
Anita Ekberg in La Dolce Vita (1960)

She stayed in Rome to make La Dolce Vita (1960) for Federico Fellini, performing as Sylvia Rank, the unattainable "dream woman" of the character played by Marcello Mastroianni. The film features a scene of her cavorting in Rome's Trevi Fountain alongside Mastroianni, which has been called "one of cinema's most iconic scenes".

The movie was an international sensation and Ekberg settled in Rome. She had the lead in an Italian-French co production, Last Train to Shanghai (1960) (aka The Dam on the Yellow River), then was in Le tre eccetera del colonnello (1960), The Call Girl Business (1960), Behind Closed Doors (1961), and The Mongols (1961), which had an American director (Andre de Toth) and co star (Jack Palance).

She later said "things became a little bit boring for me after La Dolce Vita because every producer or director in Italy, England and America wanted me to recreate the same role – the movie star from America who comes over to Italy."

Ekberg then appeared in Boccaccio '70 (1962), a film that also featured Sophia Loren and Romy Schneider. Soon thereafter, Ekberg was being considered by Broccoli to play the first Bond girl, Honey Ryder in Dr. No, but the role went to the then-unknown Ursula Andress. However Broccoli then cast her in Call Me Bwana (1963) with Bob Hope. Call Me Bwana was featured in the second Bond film, From Russia with Love, during a sequence where Ali Kerim Bey assassinates the Russian agent Krilencu with a sniper rifle. Krilencu attempts to escape through a window, which is situated in Anita Ekberg's mouth, on the wall-sized poster: "She should have kept her mouth shut", Bond quips.

Ekberg co-starred with Andress, Frank Sinatra, and Dean Martin in the western-comedy 4 for Texas (1963). She returned to Europe to make Love Factory (1964) and Who Wants to Sleep? (1965). She went to England for an Agatha Christie adaptation, The Alphabet Murders (1965), directed by Frank Tashlin who had directed her two Martin and Lewis films.

Ekberg was in the Italian How I Learned to Love Women (1966) then had a small role in a Jerry Lewis comedy, Way... Way Out (1966). She was in Pardon, Are You For or Against? (1966), an Alberto Sordi comedy; The Cobra (1967), an Italian crime film with Dana Andrews; The Glass Sphinx (1967) with Robert Taylor; Woman Times Seven (1967), an anthology directed by Vittorio De Sica, in a segment with Michael Caine; and Crónica de un atraco (1968).

She had a cameo in If It's Tuesday, This Must Be Belgium (1969) and the lead in Fangs of the Living Dead (1969), Death Knocks Twice (1969), and A Candidate for a Killing (1969).

=== Later career ===
Fellini called Ekberg back for a cameo in The Clowns (1970). She had bigger parts in The Divorce (1970) with Vittorio Gassman; The Conjugal Debt (1970); Quella chiara notte d'ottobre (1970); The French Sex Murders (1972), a giallo; and Deadly Trackers (1972).

She went to Asia to make a Hollywood film, Northeast of Seoul (1972). In 1972, she sued an Italian magazine for publishing naked photographs of her.

Ekberg was also in Gold of the Amazon Women (1979), Killer Nun (1979), S.H.E: Security Hazards Expert (1980), Cicciabomba (1982), and The Seduction of Angela (1986). Fellini used her in Intervista (1987), appearing as herself in a reunion scene with Mastroianni.

Later performances included Count Max (1991), Ambrogio (1992), Cattive ragazze (1992), Witness Run (1996), and Bámbola (1996), in a part turned down by Gina Lollobrigida. She had a good part in Le nain rouge (1998).

She guest-starred in the 2001 Italian TV series Il bello delle donne.

== Personal life ==
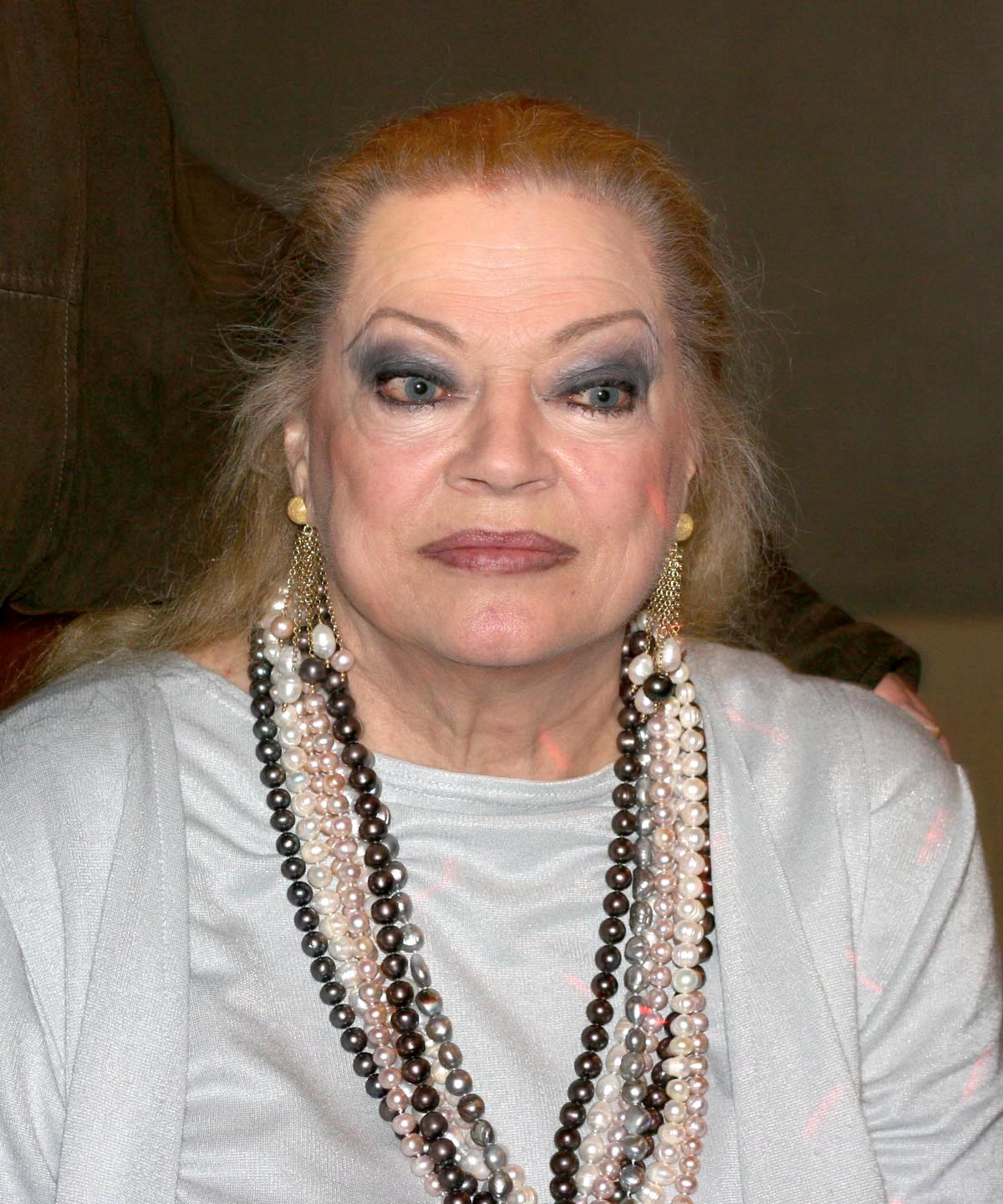
Ekberg in Lund in 2007

Both of Ekberg's marriages were to actors, and both ended in divorce. She was married to Anthony Steel from 22 May 1956 until their divorce on 14 May 1959 and to Rik Van Nutter from 9 April 1963 until their divorce in 1975. In a 2006 interview, she said she wished she had a child, but stated just the opposite six months later. Ekberg's great love was Gianni Agnelli, the Italian industrialist and owner of Fiat. They were lovers for several years, although he was married.

Ekberg was often outspoken in interviews, for example, naming famous people she reportedly "couldn't bear." She was also frequently quoted as saying that it was Fellini who owed his success to her, rather than vice versa: "They would like to keep up the story that Fellini made me famous, that Fellini discovered me," she said in a 1999 interview with The New York Times.

In 1960, after paparazzi followed her home to her villa from a nightclub, she was photographed kneeing one of them in the groin, and pulling out a bow and arrow to threaten others. Felice Quinto claimed she shot arrows at him.

Ekberg did not live in Sweden after the early 1950s and rarely visited the country. However, she welcomed Swedish journalists into her home outside Rome and in 2005, appeared on the popular radio program Sommar, talking about her life. She stated in an interview that she would not move back to Sweden but would be buried there.

In 1963, she was sued by her publicist. In 1977, she was robbed in August and in December.

On 19 July 2009, she was admitted to the San Giovanni Hospital in Rome after falling ill in her home in Genzano, according to a medical official in the hospital's neurosurgery department. Despite her condition not being serious, Ekberg was put under observation in the facility.

In December 2011, it was reported that the 80-year-old Ekberg was "destitute" following three months in a Rimini hospital with a broken hip, during which time her home was robbed of jewellery and furniture, and her villa was badly damaged by fire. Ekberg applied for help from the Fellini Foundation, which also found itself in difficult financial straits.

== Death ==
Ekberg died on 11 January 2015, at the age of 83, at the clinic San Raffaele in Rocca di Papa, Roman Castles, from complications of chronic illnesses. The actress had been in a wheelchair for several years after being knocked down by one of her pet Great Danes, which broke her hip. Ekberg's funeral service was held on 14 January 2015, at the Lutheran-Evangelical Christuskirche in Rome, after which her body was cremated and her remains were buried at the cemetery of Skanör Church in Sweden, in accordance with her wishes to be buried in the land of her birth.

== Legacy ==
In 2021, Italian actress Monica Bellucci co-produced and starred in a mockumentary dedicated to Ekberg, called The Girl in the Fountain and presented as a special event at the 2021 Torino Film Festival.

== Filmography ==
=== Film ===
Year	Title	Role	Notes	Ref.
1953	The Mississippi Gambler	Maid of honor	Uncredited	
1953	Abbott and Costello Go to Mars	Venusian guard		
1953	Take Me to Town	Dancehall Girl	Uncredited	
1953	The Golden Blade	Handmaiden	Uncredited	
1955	Blood Alley	Wei Ling, Big Han's wife		
1955	Artists and Models	Anita		
1956	War and Peace	Hélène Kuragin		
1956	Back from Eternity	Rena		
1956	Man in the Vault	Flo Randall		
1956	Zarak	Salma		
1956	Hollywood or Bust	Herself		
1957	Interpol	Gina Broger		
1957	Valerie	Valerie Horvat		
1958	Paris Holiday	Zara		
1958	Screaming Mimi	Virginia Wilson a.k.a. Yolanda Lange		
1958	The Man Inside	Trudie Hall		
1959	Sheba and the Gladiator	Zenobia		
1960	La Dolce Vita	Sylvia		
1960	The Dam on the Yellow River	Miss Dorothy Simmons		
1960	Le tre eccetera del colonnello	Georgina		
1960	Anonima cocottes			
1961	Behind Closed Doors	Olga Duvovich		
1961	The Mongols	Hulina		
1962	Boccaccio '70	Herself	Segment "Le tentazioni del dottor Antonio"	
1963	Call Me Bwana	Luba		
1963	4 for Texas	Elya Carlson		
1963	Bianco, rosso, giallo, rosa	Alberchiaria		
1965	Who Wants to Sleep?	Lolita Young		
1965	The Alphabet Murders	Amanda		
1966	How I Learned to Love Women	Margaret Joyce		
1966	Way...Way Out	Anna Soblova		
1966	Pardon, Are You For or Against?	Baroness Olga		
1967	The Cobra	Lou		
1967	The Glass Sphinx	Paulette		
1967	Woman Times Seven	Claudie	Segment "Snow"	
1968	Crónica de un atraco	Bessie		
1969	If It's Tuesday, This Must Be Belgium	Performer		
1969	Malenka	Malenka / Sylvia Morel		
1969	Un sudario a la medida	Jacqueline Monnard		
1969	Death Knocks Twice	Sophia Perretti		
1970	The Divorce	Flavia		
1970	Il debito coniugale	Ines		
1970	Quella chiara notte d'ottobre			
1970	The Clowns	Herself		
1972	Casa d'appuntamento	Madame Colette		
1972	Deadly Trackers	Jane		
1972	Northeast of Seoul	Katherine		
1979	Killer Nun	Sister Gertrude		
1980	S*H*E	Dr. Biebling		
1982	Cicciabomba	Baronessa Judith von Kemp		
1986	Dolce pelle di Angela	Signora Rocchi		
1987	Intervista	Herself		
1991	Count Max	Marika		
1992	Ambrogio	Clarice		
1992	Dov'era Lei a quell'Ora?	Anita Ekberg		
1992	Cattive ragazze	Milli		
1996	Bambola	Mother Greta		
1998	Le nain rouge	Paola Bendoni		

=== Television ===
Year	Title	Role	Notes	Ref.
1979	Gold of the Amazon Women	Queen Na-Eela	Television film	

== See also ==
- High School Confidential (Rough Trade song)
- The Freewheelin' Bob Dylan (Ekberg is referenced in the song "I Shall Be Free".)
