= Crime After School (1975 film) =

- Directed by: Alfred Vohrer
- Written by: Werner P. Zibaso; George Hurdalek; Herbert Reinecker
- Produced by: Hans Pflüger
- Starring: Teri Tordai; Herbert Fleischmann; Sascha Hehn
- Cinematography: Charly Steinberger
- Edited by: Ingeborg Taschner
- Production companies: TV13 Filmproduktion; Terra-Filmkunst; Hungarofilm
- Distributed by: Constantin Film
- Release date: 23 May 1975
- Running time: 84 minutes
- Countries: West Germany; Hungary
- Language: German

Crime After School (German: Verbrechen nach Schulschluß) is a 1975 West German-Hungarian crime drama film directed by Alfred Vohrer and starring Teri Tordai, Herbert Fleischmann and Sascha Hehn. It is an anthology film with three episodes and is not a remake of Alfred Vohrer's 1959 film with the same title.

== Cast ==
- Teri Tordai as Tina Gregor
- Herbert Fleischmann as Alexander Gregor
- Sascha Hehn as Franz Brugger
- Malte Thorsten as Karl Sperber
- Achim Neumann as Ulli
- Oliver Collignon as Oliver Behringer
- Evelyne Kraft as Sabine
- Pierre Franckh as Götz Overmeier
- Felix Franchy as Hannes Melzer
- Marie Zürer as Betty

== Bibliography ==
- Bock, Hans-Michael & Bergfelder, Tim. The Concise CineGraph. Encyclopedia of German Cinema. Berghahn Books, 2009.
- Goble, Alan. The Complete Index to Literary Sources in Film. Walter de Gruyter, 1999.
