= Desert of Fire (1971 film) =

- Directed by: Renzo Merusi
- Written by: Renzo Merusi; Leandro Lucchetti
- Starring: Edwige Fenech; George Wang; Giuseppe Addobbati
- Cinematography: Sergio Salvati
- Edited by: Maurizio Mangosi
- Music by: Franco Bixio
- Production company: Nuova Films
- Release date: 28 August 1971
- Running time: 85 minutes
- Country: Italy
- Language: Italian

Desert of Fire (Italian: Deserto di fuoco) is a 1971 Italian adventure film directed by Renzo Merusi and starring Edwige Fenech, George Wang and Giuseppe Addobbati. The filming locations is in Tunisia.

== Cast ==
- Edwige Fenech as Juana
- George Wang as El Marish
- Giuseppe Addobbati as Jean
- Pietro Martellanza as Bill
- Zohra Faïza
- Ettore Marcello
- Carla Mancini
- Fatma Bentali

== Bibliography ==
- Quinlan, David. Quinlan's illustrated directory of film stars. Batsford, 1996.
