= Renato Mambor =

Italian painter, writer, photographer, and actor

- Born: 4 December 1936; Rome, Italy
- Died: 6 December 2014 (aged 78); Rome, Italy
- Occupations: Painter; Actor

Renato Mambor (4 December 1936 – 6 December 2014) was an Italian painter, writer, photographer and actor.

== Biography ==
Born in Rome, Mambor was a member of the 1960s artistic movement known as the Scuola di Piazza del Popolo together with Mario Schifano, Pino Pascali and Jannis Kounellis, among others. He is considered the founder of the "Conceptual Neo-Figuration" movement (Italian: Neofigurazione Concettuale). His artistic interests included photography, performance art and installation art. He was also active in cinema as a writer, a poster designer and character actor.
