= Cultural depictions of Medusa and Gorgons =

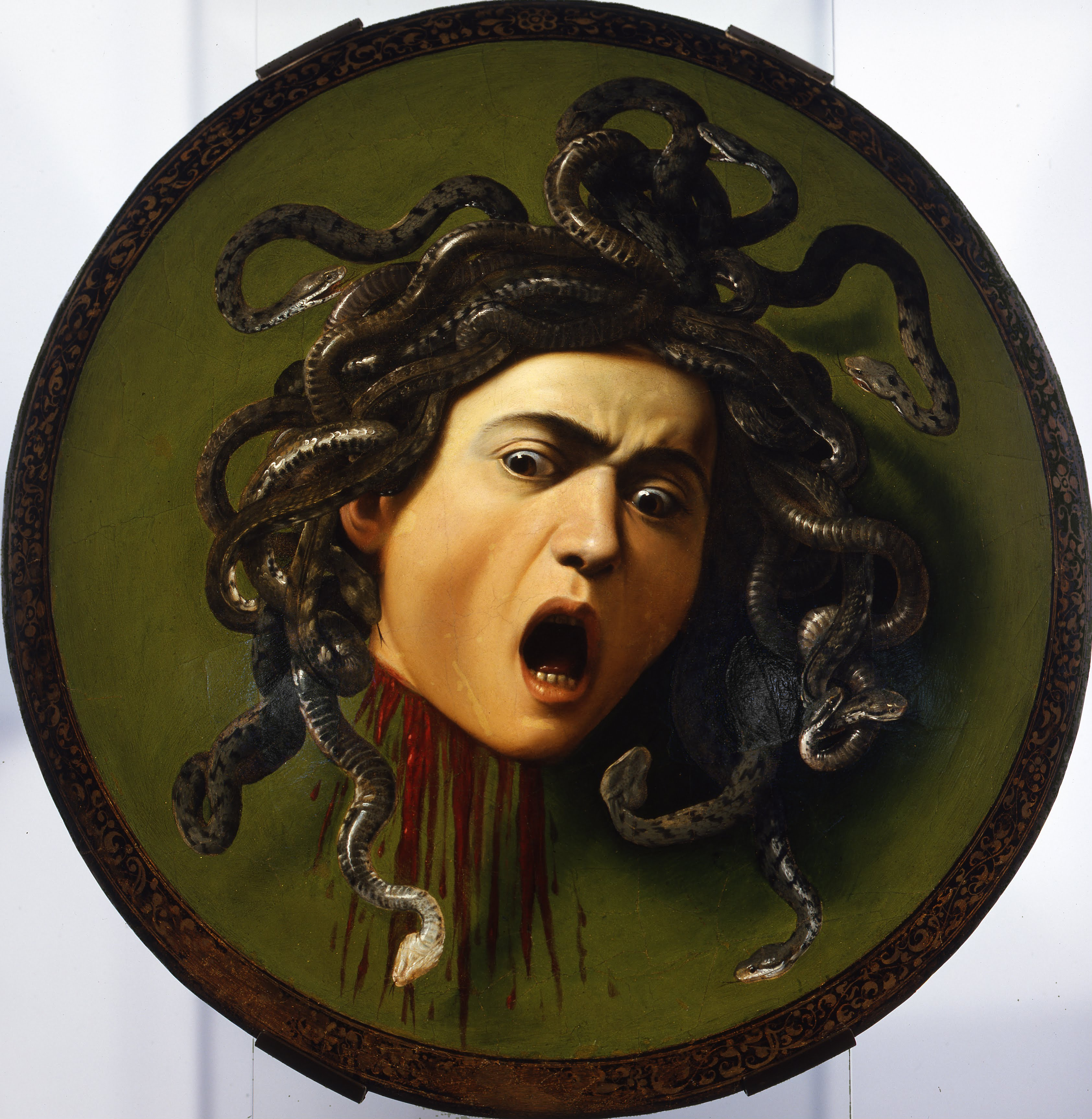
Medusa by Caravaggio; Ufizzi Gallery, Florence

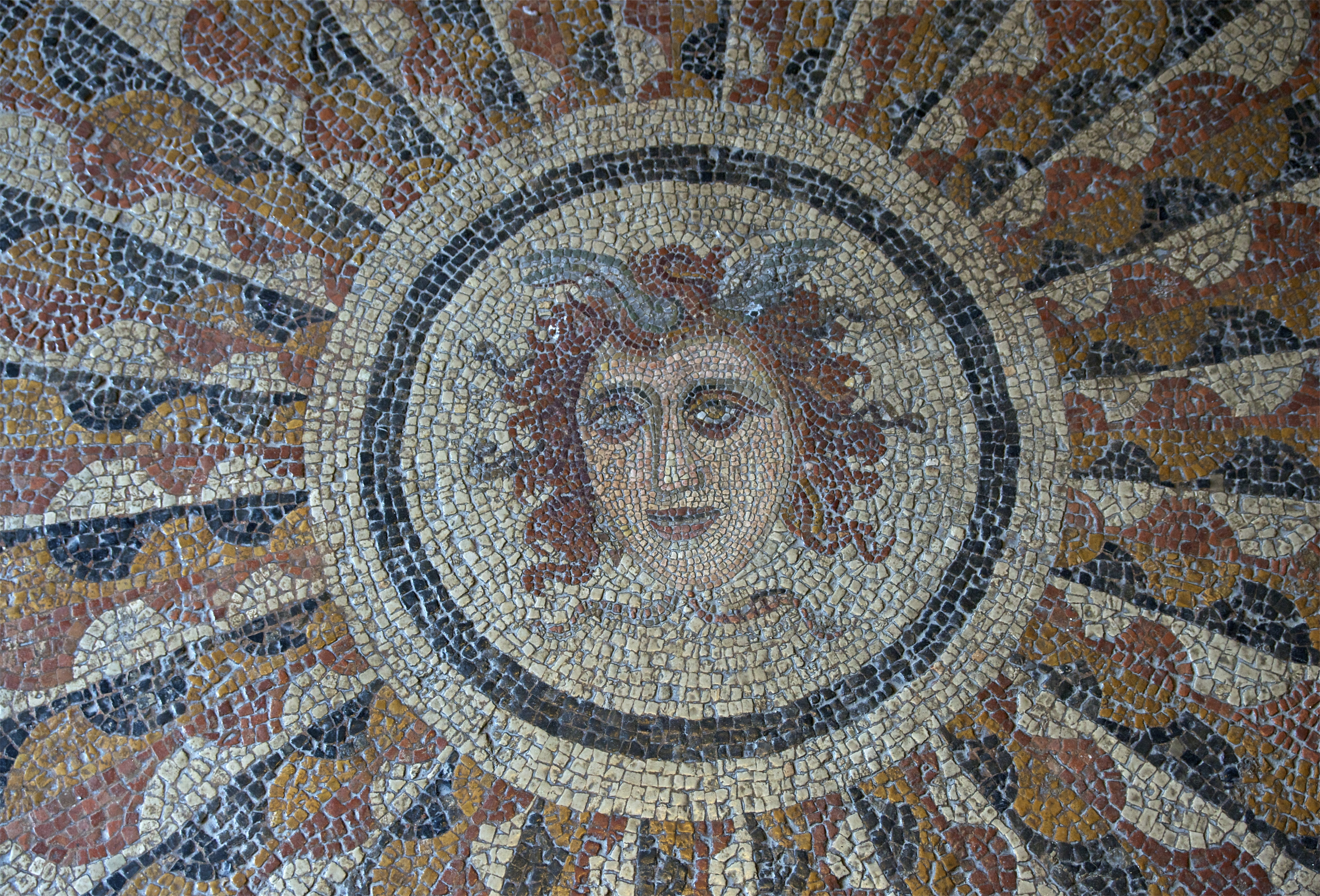
Central motive of the Medusa mosaic, 2nd century BCE, from Kos island, in the palace of the Grand Master of the Knights of Rhodes, in Rhodes city, island of Rhodes, Greece.

Medusa and the other Gorgon sisters, Stheno and Euryale, have been featured in art and culture spanning from the days of ancient Greece to present day. Medusa is the most well-known of the three mythological monsters, having been variously portrayed as a monster, a protective symbol, a rallying symbol for liberty, and a sympathetic victim of rape or a curse.

The Gorgons are best known by their hair of living venomous snakes and ability to turn living creatures to stone. Medusa herself is an ancient icon that remains one of the most popular and enduring figures of Greek mythology. She continues to be recreated in pop culture and art, surpassing the popularity of many other mythological characters. Her likeness has been immortalized by artists including Leonardo da Vinci, Peter Paul Rubens, Caravaggio, Pablo Picasso, Auguste Rodin, and Benvenuto Cellini.

== Ancient Greece ==
Medusa's image underwent visual transformations, each mirroring evolving conceptions of gender, power, and the monstrous feminine. The earliest depictions, appearing around the eighth century BCE, emphasize her monstrosity: large fierce eyes, a wide snarling mouth, fangs or tusks, and a frontal gaze meant to threaten the viewer with petrification, highlighting her function as an apotropaic image intended to avert evil. This Gorgon iconography, common on shields and temple pediments such as that of Artemis at Corfu, embodied primal fears and anxieties, and mirrored broader societal transformations as the wild feminine came to be associated with chaos and the need for control, coinciding with the transition from matriarchal to patriarchal structures.

A transitional period then saw artists lessen Medusa's monstrosity, introducing more subtle, human-like, and passive elements, as in the red-figure krater attributed to the Villa Giulia Painter, which stripped her of her petrification powers. This shift occurred alongside increasingly stringent restrictions on women in Classical Greece, particularly under the laws of Solon, as elite women were confined to the domestic sphere and expected to embody passivity and beauty, making Medusa's growing passivity a direct reflection of women's diminishing agency and public presence.

The most significant transformation came in the Classical period, when her grotesque features virtually vanished, replaced by idealized human proportions, with only serpents or wings, as in the Polygnotos pelike and the Medusa Rondanini, left as reminders of her mythical origins. No longer a terror to be conquered, she inspired sympathy rather than fear, reflecting both the Classical pursuit of idealized beauty and harmony and a growing cultural fascination with the emotional and psychological depths of mythological figures, much like Euripides' portrayal of Medea.

== To the Renaissance ==
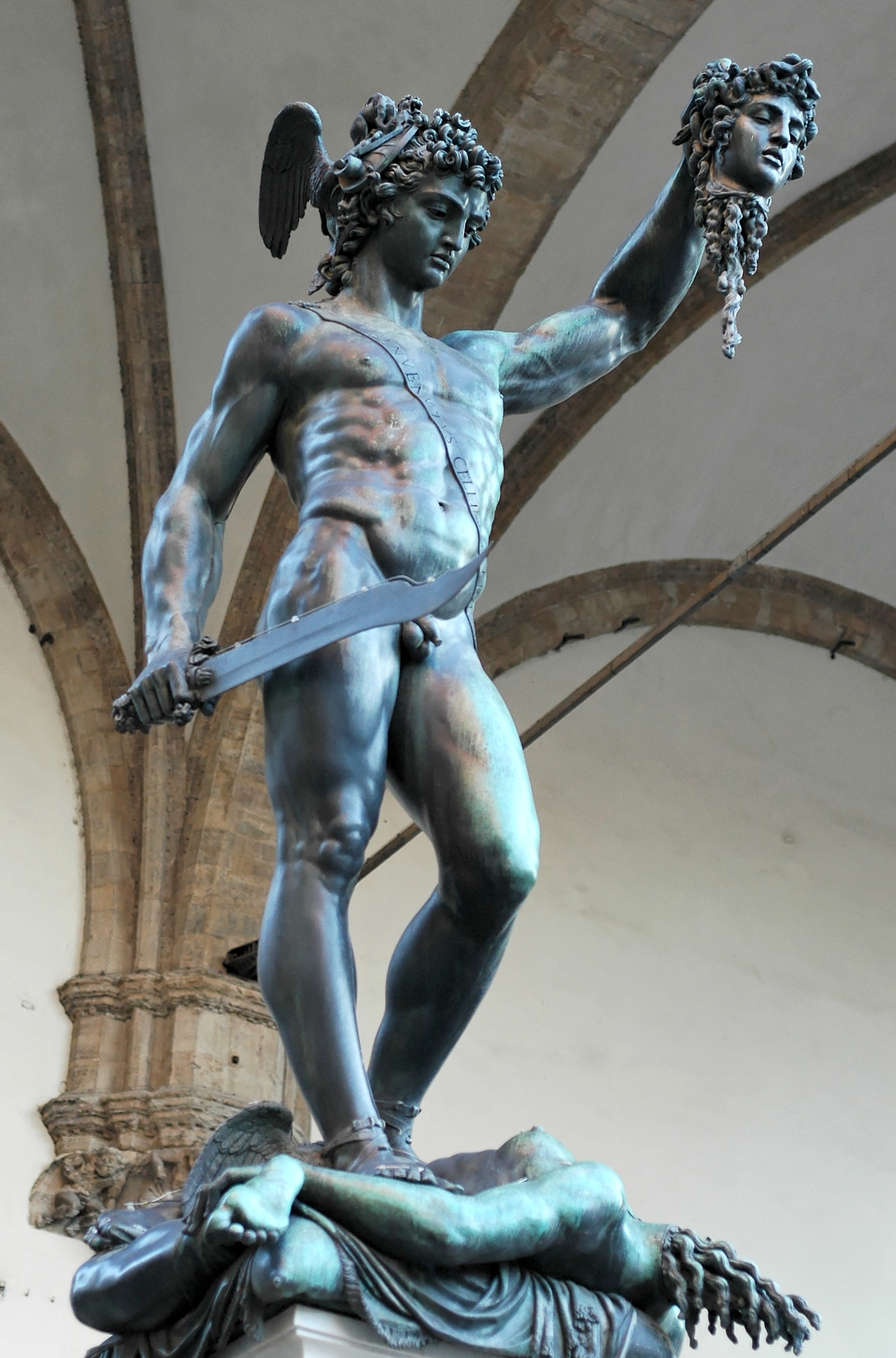
Cellini's bronze statue of Perseus with the Head of Medusa, completed in the Renaissance

By the Renaissance, artists depicted Medusa's head held aloft to represent the realistic human form of the triumphant hero Perseus (such as in the 1554 bronze statue Perseus with the Head of Medusa by Benvenuto Cellini). Medusa's head was also depicted to evoke horror by making the detached head the main subject (as demonstrated by the 1597 painting Medusa by Baroque painter Caravaggio).

== 19th century ==
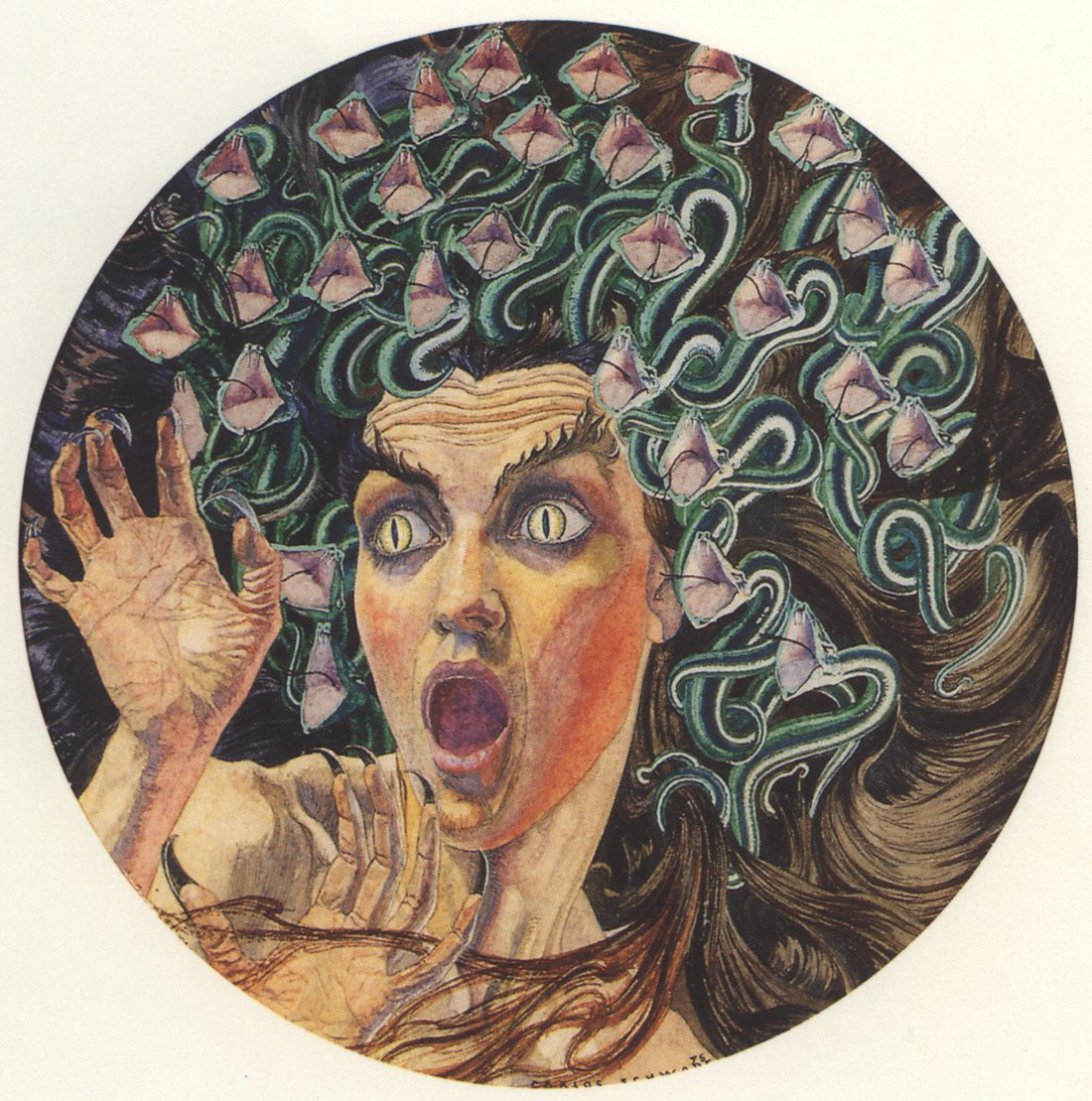
Medusa (1895), watercolour by Carlos Schwabe

After the French Revolution, Medusa was used as a popular emblem of Jacobinism and was often displayed as a figure of "French Liberty." This was in opposition to "English Liberty," which was personified by Athena (whose shield bore Medusa's head). "To radicals like Percy Bysshe Shelley, Medusa was an 'abject hero,' a victim of tyranny whose weakness, disfiguration, and monstrous mutilation [had] become, in themselves, a kind of revolutionary power." Shelley's 1819 poem, On the Medusa of Leonardo da Vinci in the Florentine Gallery was published posthumously by his wife Mary Shelley in 1824. Octave Mirbeau's use of Medusa during his time has also been examined.

== Modern use ==
The image of Medusa's severed head has become one of the most-recognized images from Greek mythology. A representation of Perseus carrying this head has been featured on the cover of a number of paperback editions of Edith Hamilton's Mythology and several editions of Bulfinch's Mythology. Medusa also became a very popular icon in designer fashion, as the logo of the Italian luxury clothing brand Versace portrays a Gorgon head. Luciano Garbati's 2008 sculpture, Medusa with the Head of Perseus, portrays her clutching the severed head of Perseus, later becoming a feminist avatar for the MeToo movement.

=== Anime and Manga ===
- In the anime series Beyblade: Metal Fusion, Reiji Mizuchi, one of the antagonists of Metal Fusion, owns the Beyblade Poison Serpent, which originally is based on a Cobra, but when in Attack mode, is based on Medusa. In the follow-up series Metal Masters, Julian Konzern's Beyblade, Gravity Destroyer (or Gravity Perseus in the Japanese dub of Metal Masters, is originally based on the Greek hero Perseus, but when in Counter mode, it is based on Medusa and it freezes its opponents to stone when this happens.
- In One Piece, the Gorgon Sisters - Boa Hancock, Boa Sandersonia, and Boa Marigold - have powers they claim to have gained as a curse from slaying a monster called the Gorgon, hence their name. Hancock petrifies those who lust after her, while Sandersonia and Marigold can respectively shapeshift into anaconda and king cobra-like monsters; all three sisters also claim to each have, on her back, an extra pair of eyes that petrify those foolish enough to look at them. The truth, however, is that the Gorgon sisters actually gained their powers from being fed Devil Fruits when they were enslaved and on their backs are not extra eyes, but marks branded on them by their owners. For four years, the Gorgon sisters were forced to use their powers to entertain their owners until they and their fellow slaves were liberated. Ashamed of their past, the Gorgon sisters came up with the lie about being cursed when they founded their own pirate fleet.

• In Doraemon's Long Stories: Nobita's Great Adventure into the Underworld ((and its film adaptations, 1984 and 2007), Medusa is portrayed as one of the major villains who lives in the demon world serving the Demon King.

=== Comics and Graphic Novels ===
- Since 1964, Medusa has been appearing in issues of Wonder Woman, and has battled against Diana herself many times.
- In one volume of Lumberjanes, the Gorgons are depicted as approachable women who blindfold themselves with their snakes to avoid accidentally petrifying mortals who want to speak with them. When a series of petrifactions occur around the campsite, the Gorgons are the prime suspects, only for the true culprits to be revealed as a flock of basilisks unleashed by an evil goddess whom the snake-haired women originally turned to stone by the Olympians' command. Upon being freed, the vengeful deity has plotted to frame the Gorgons to get back at them for imprisoning her. In the climax, the Gorgons and the Lumberjanes team up to round up the basilisks and defeat the goddess using them.
- Medusa appears in comic issue #32 of Tales to Astonish (1959) in the segment "The Girl in the Black Hood!" In the story, she is shown to be working as a first prize-winning photographer in the 1920s under the pseudonym May Dusa. She is described by people as being the best photographer in the business with her fine and sensitive works. May Dusa is also spoken of as being an outstanding but strange and beautiful but eccentric great artist since she has never allowed anyone to see her face, as she always has it covered up by a long black hood. When a heartless larcener named Mister Jones phones her and sets up a fake photograph appointment with the prospect of robbing her, he demands that she removes her hood at gunpoint. Despite her repeated refusals, Jones insists on seeing her face, threatening to shoot her if she doesn't comply. May Dusa finally relents and removes her hood for the first time, showing Jones her face. Jones reacts with horror upon seeing it. May Dusa teasingly asks if he likes what he sees before playfully chastising him that being silent and not moving is no way to act around a lady. Jones turns to stone. The final panel of the comic shows her as having a normal beautiful human face but with snakes for hair and saying that her real name is "Medusa".
- Valentina, the archenemy of Darna, was based on and influenced by Gorgons of Greek mythology, but lacks the ability to turn people to stone.
- Stheno and Euryale appear as supporting characters in Felicia Day's graphic novel The Lost Daughter of Sparta. The first of Philonoe's three tasks assigned to her by Aphrodite is to steal the snake-haired women's shawl made of starlight, which is implied to have belonged to their late mortal sister, Medusa.

=== Screen ===
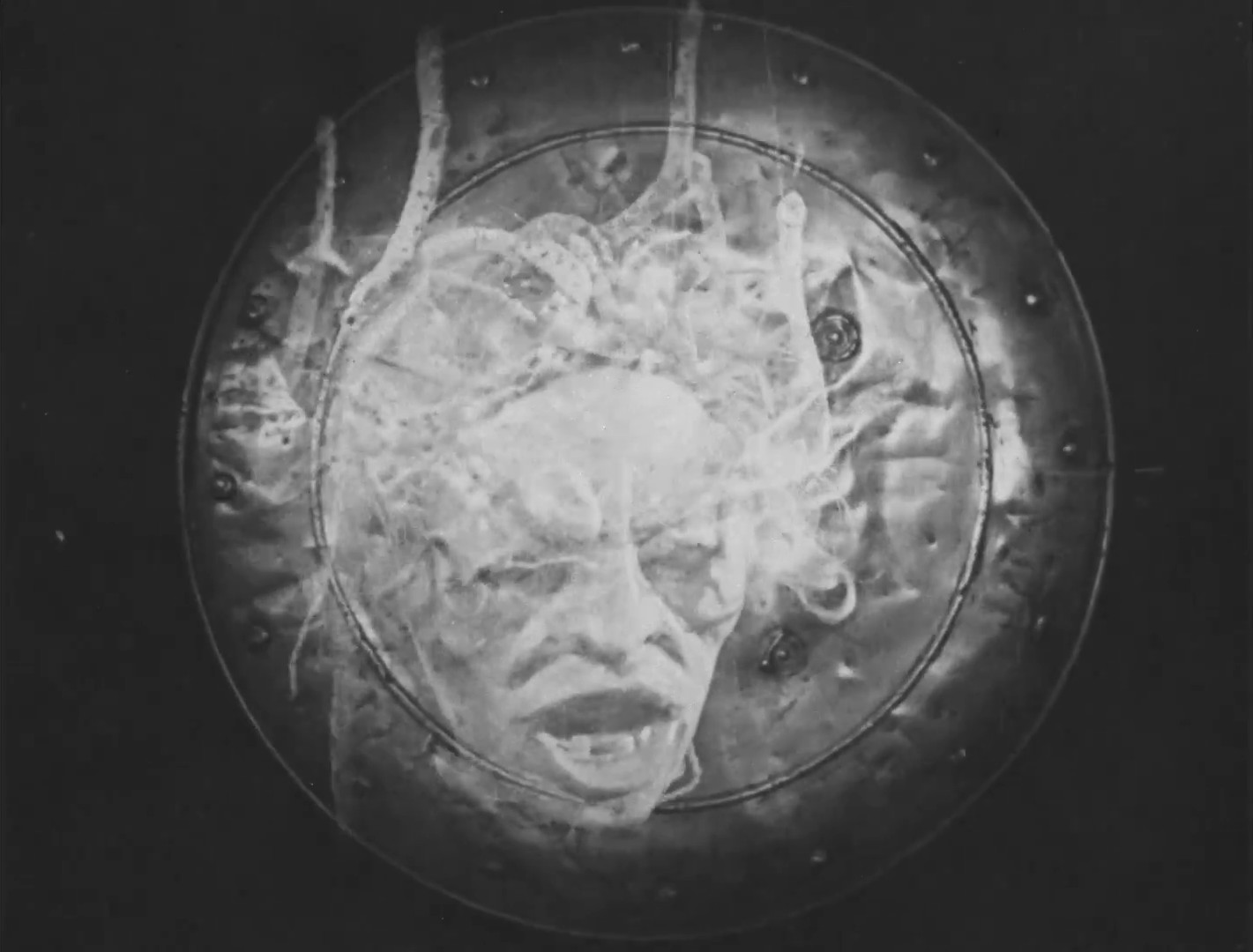
Medusa reflected in Perseus's shield, from The Gorgon's Head (1925)

- The myth of Perseus and Medusa was adapted into a 1925 silent short film titled The Gorgon's Head. In 2020, The Gorgon's Head is among the films uploaded on the Metropolitan Museum of Art's official YouTube channel to celebrate the exhibition's 150th anniversary.
- Medusa also appears in the 1962 Italian sword-and-sandal film Arrivano I Titani, performed by uncredited actress Alba Maiolini wearing live snakes in her hair.
- Medusa is a character in the 1964 film 7 Faces of Dr. Lao.
- The myth of the Gorgon was the basis for the 1964 Hammer horror film, The Gorgon, which "abandoned the traditional myth entirely and tried to tell a new story".
- Euryale, a gorgon and one of Medusa's immortal sisters, is portrayed by Susan Hampshire in the 1972 Harry Kümel surreal fantasy mystery film Malpertuis based on the novel of the same name by Belgian author Jean Ray.
- Medusa is a character in the 1981 film, Clash of the Titans. Special-effects creator Ray Harryhausen used stop motion animation to depict the battle with Medusa. Although "the essential story sticks closer to its sources than any other interpretation", the film takes creative liberties as Medusa's biology differs from "any previous representations, ancient or modern", with the lower body of a snake rather than legs. In addition to her stone gaze and snake hair, she also fights with a bow and arrow, the tips of said arrows anointed with deadly poison. Medusa is also featured in the 2010 remake of the film, with a more human face that contorts when she turns her victims to stone.
- Duzer is a Gorgon in the 1990 animated series Gravedale High.
- The myth of Medusa is central to the Tales from the Cryptkeeper episode segment, Myth Conceptions. A greedy archaeologist is in Greece, searching for Medusa's temple. He tells a local village girl named Zola that contrary to popular belief, Perseus was just the name a thief used to get attention and had failed to slay Medusa; and that he is after the demigod's polished gold shield. After digging for a number of days and nights, the archaeologist finds Medusa's temple, which is full of her petrified victims; including one who claimed to be Perseus, still clutching his gold shield. Ignoring Zola's warning, the archaeologist steals the shield, but gets lost while looking for an exit and eventually gets petrified by Medusa herself. Standing in front of the now petrified archaeologist, Zola tells him that Medusa has actually been protecting her temple from the likes of him and the man who claimed to be Perseus. In a twist ending, Zola picks up the shield and laughs, her snake-haired reflection revealing her true identity as Medusa, changing her form to keep plunderers out of her temple and petrifying them when they trespass.
- In The Real Adventures of Jonny Quest "Heroes", an avatar of Medusa (voiced by Frank Welker) was created by Dr. Jeremiah Surd in an attempt to guard the remains of a statue to Apollo in the virtual world.
- In The Powerpuff Girls, one of the villains is Sedusa, a greedy woman with prehensile locks of hair.
- In Pixar's Monsters, Inc., Mike Wazowski's one-eyed girlfriend, Celia Mae (voiced by Jennifer Tilly), has snake hair like the Gorgons but lacks the ability to petrify those who meet her gaze.
- Medusa appears in two DC Comics-based animated TV series. The first is the Challenge of the Superfriends episode "Battle of the Gods" (1978), where she is voiced by Shannon Farnon; in the climax, she accidentally petrifies herself by looking at her reflection in Wonder Woman's bracelet. The second is the Justice League Unlimited episode "This Little Piggy", where she is voiced by Laraine Newman; imprisoned in Tartarus, she has her sentence reduced for helping Batman and Zatanna locate her escaped cellmate Circe
- Medusa (voiced by Catherine Traicos) is the main protagonist of two Australian stop motion animated short films directed by Pierce Davison; in a subversion to her traditional portrayals, it isn't her gaze, but rather her snakes who petrify living creatures whenever they get offended.
  - In Medusa (2003), the eponymous Gorgon signs up for a VHS dating service to get a date. However, Medusa's snakes keep petrifying all her potential boyfriends-sent by Cupid-because they cannot stand the sight of her slithering hairdo.
  - In Medusa: First Date (2004), the Gorgon now has a new boyfriend named Eric, but her short-tempered snakes once again cause trouble beyond her control.
- Medusa and her sisters Euryale and Stheno appear in the Class of the Titans episode "Sibling Rivalry".
- Medusa appears as the Rider class Servant in the anime adaptations of Fate/Stay Night, voiced by Yū Asakawa. There she is the Servant of Sakura Matou, but is loaned to her brother Shinji when she is unwilling to fight.
- The Gorgons appear in the American Dragon: Jake Long episodes, "Bring It On" and "Furious Jealousy". In an adaptational change to their original portrayal, all three Gorgons - Fury, Euryale, and Medusa - are immortal, yet they were still defeated by Perseus who tricked them into looking at their own reflections in Athena's shield, petrifying themselves. Mistaken for statues, the Gorgons were shipped off to American museums. Centuries later on a school field trip, Professor Rotwood sets off a chain reaction that knocks over Fury, unknowingly freeing her. Fury then hypnotizes the school cheerleaders into helping her find and free her fellow Gorgons. The climax of the episode takes place at the Hudson River where Jake Long and his allies battle all three Gorgons on a fishing boat. Jake's friend, Trixie Carter, drives the Gorgons jealous by saying that Medusa will always be more popular than the other two. In an act of sibling rivalry, the Gorgons petrify each other. Jake, his allies, and the freed cheerleaders leave the Gorgons to sink to the bottom of the Hudson River.
- Medusa appears in the film Percy Jackson & the Olympians: The Lightning Thief (played by Uma Thurman), where she attacks Percy Jackson and his friends as they are looking for the Pearl of Persephone in her garden (which has statues: people she has turned to stone). When Percy's friends drive a car through a wall Medusa is distracted and Percy decapitates her before escaping. The trio then keeps Medusa's head, using it to kill the Hydra. In a mid-credits scene, Percy's abusive step-father Gabe Ugliano finds Medusa's severed head in the refrigerator and is turned to stone.
- In the climax of the 2019 animated film Wonder Woman: Bloodlines, Diana and Vanessa Kapatelis battle against Medusa (voiced by Cree Summer), who has been resurrected and sent by Villainy Inc. to invade Themyscira and steal the Amazons' technology.
- Medusa (played by Jemima Rooper) appears in the BBC One series Atlantis before she became a Gorgon.
- In the film Miss Peregrine's Home for Peculiar Children, the two masked twins' "peculiarity" is revealed to be that they are Gorgons, with serpentine faces and the ability to petrify.
- In the Netflix series, Chilling Adventures of Sabrina, there is a Gorgon character named Nagaina. She turned the seer Rosalind and the Witch Dorcas into stone, they were later turned back into flesh and Rosalind beheaded Nagaina with a sword.
- In the 2018 version of Charmed, Medusa is summoned to punish members of a fraternity for slutshaming a girl. Instead of killing her, one of the protagonists sympathizes with her pain as a rape victim which convinces Medusa to undo her damage.
- In the 2021 animated film Cryptozoo, Phoebe, one of the main characters, is a Gorgon from Greece and was voiced by a Greek actress Angeliki Papoulia.
- In the 2022 film V/H/S/99, the fourth segment, "The Gawkers", features a group of friends who spy on an attractive blonde girl named Sandra via spyware on her webcam, only to discover that she is actually a gorgon which attacks and petrifies them all as revenge.
- In the 2022 series Wednesday, a group of students attending Nevermore Academy, a private school for monstrous outcasts, are gorgons. The group includes male students, and they only change people to stone when their snakes are uncovered. One gorgon accidentally temporarily turns himself to stone upon seeing himself getting out of the shower.
- In an Amazon Prime advertisement Medusa (portrayed by Jesi Le Rae) is depicted buying new sunglasses through the service in order to show off her fun side.
- Medusa appears in the Percy Jackson and the Olympians episode "We Visit the Garden Gnome Emporium", portrayed by Jessica Parker Kennedy.
- Medusa appears on Season 9 of television series The Masked Singer. In the season finale, Medusa was declared the winner and was unmasked as Bishop Briggs, beating David Archuleta as “Macaw”.

=== Video games ===
- Medusa and her Gorgon sisters, as well as creatures inspired by them, have been featured in gaming since the advent of role-playing games (RPGs), from Dungeons & Dragons, to God of War, to Final Fantasy.
- Medusa appears as a recurring enemy in the Castlevania series.
- Medusa is the primary antagonist in the Nintendo Entertainment System game Kid Icarus (1986) and the earlier levels of the Nintendo 3DS game Kid Icarus: Uprising (2012), where in the latter, she is teased as the main antagonist of the game when it is actually Hades.
- Medusa is a unit in Heroes of Might and Magic series.
- In Fate/stay night (2004), Medusa appears as the Rider-class servant in her pre-transformation human form. Later installments of the franchise expand on her and introduce her sisters. In the Fate franchise's fictional universe, the three sisters were originally worshipped as chthonic deities before being exiled to their island by rival cults. Rumors of her monstrous nature eventually transformed Medusa against her will into the Gorgon, who then devoured Stheno and Euryale.
- Gorgons appear as enemies in Titan Quest (2006).
- Medusa appears in Dota 2 (2013).
- Medusa appears as a playable character in Smite (2014).
- Medusa appears in Assassin's Creed Odyssey (2018), where she is implied to be a human that has been transformed by the effects of the Apple of Eden.
- A Gorgon is used as a boss fight in the 2016 game Enter the Gungeon, in the game's second level. The boss is named the Gorgun to fit with the game's style of everything being gun related.
- In the 2020 video game Hades, it is implied that Dusa, the disembodied Gorgon head serving as the maid for the House of Hades, was Medusa before being decapitated. Her name Dusa and her being a maid is also a play on words of the name Medusa: Maid-Dusa. Disembodied Gorgon heads also appear as enemies in the game.
- Gorgon's Quest is a platformer that can be played solo or with another player in co-op. After Perseus beheads Medusa, Stheno and Euryale travel ancient Greece to track down the demigod, petrify him and other enemies, and bring their youngest sister's head back to her in the underworld.
- In Just Dance 2022, the three coaches in "Black Mamba" are named after Stheno (P1), Medusa (P2) and Euryale (P3). They later return in Just Dance+ in the Wonder Tales Pack in the song “World Eater” by Ashnikko where during the dance for “World Eater” they curse Queen Alethea (the coach of Folded by Kehlani) to become the monster we saw her as in Human by Sevdaliza leading her to become “The Forgotten Queen”.
- Medusa is a skin in Fortnite, which was only available in the Myths and Mortals Battlepass of Chapter 5 Season 2.
- Medusa is a character from Need for Speed Unbound, developed by Criterion Games and published by Electronic Arts in 2022. She is a street racer of Italian ethnicity who participates in the underground street racing scene of Lakeshore City, a fictional city inspired by Chicago, Illinois. She is an influencer who showcase the creativity of young woman in Lakeshore, she wears Versace clothing and drives a custom 2009 Lamborghini Murciélago LP 670-4 SuperVeloce.

=== Music ===
- Thrash metal band Anthrax dedicates a song to Medusa on their album Spreading The Disease.
- Annie Lennox (of Eurythmics fame), titled her UK no.1, 2nd solo album Medusa, which is album of cover-tunes containing no songs named Medusa.
- British band UB40 produced a song ("Madame Medusa") for their 1980 album, Signing Off, drawing unfavorable comparisons between the mythological monster and United Kingdom Prime Minister Margaret Thatcher.
- Sidhu Moose Wala used photo of Medusa in the Intro of his album MooseTape.
- Whitney Avalon released Plaything of the Gods, a 2020 song written from Medusa's point of view.
- Heather Dale's 2005 album "The Road to Santiago" included the song "Medusa," also from Medusa's point of view.
- Another song named Medusa was released by Kailee Morgue in 2017.
- Bring Me the Horizon have a song titled “(I Used to Make Out With) Medusa" on their 2006 album Count Your Blessings.
- Kaia Jette released a song titled Medusa in 2023.
- Angel Witch released a song titled Gorgon as part of their album Angel Witch in 1980
- Electronic group MEDUZA often features Medusa on their album covers
- molly ofgeography released a song titled Medusa in a Stone Garden as part of her EP Runaway, Run in 2020
- In 2021 Fausto Palma released Petra Medusa featuring her head as the cover
- Willowbank Grove released a song titled Medusa in 2023
- Theory of a Deadman released a song titled Medusa (Stone) as part of their album Dinosaur in 2023
- Lyra released a song titled Medusa in 2023
- "Maze of the Serpentine Gaze" (2025), a track from the concept EP Serene Despair by British artist Antoin Gibson.

=== Literature ===
- Euryale, a gorgon and one of Medusa's immortal sisters, is one of the major characters of Malpertuis (1943) by Belgian fantasy writer Jean Ray.
- Author Skevi Philippou wrote Medusa, through the eyes of the Gorgon in 2010.
- Medusa appears in The Lightning Thief where, having reformed following her defeat at Perseus' hands thousands of years earlier, Medusa faces off against Percy Jackson and his friends. Much like the original Perseus, Percy decapitates Medusa before he sends her head to the gods as a gift. Poseidon later returns Medusa's head to Percy and it is used by his mother Sally to kill her abusive husband Gabe Ugliano. In the second book of the sequel series, The Son of Neptune, Percy is attacked by Stheno and Euryale, who want revenge for their sister's death.
- The 2016 novella Here, the world entire, by Anwen Kya Hayward, is a reimagining of the Medusa and Perseus myth, exploring Medusa's reflection about the events leading to her transformation, her centuries of solitary captivity and her self-doubting when first meeting Perseus.
- From 2019 to 2020, author Claire Davon self-published Redemption of the Gorgons, a fantasy novel trilogy consisting of three books: Gorgon's Price, Gorgon's Quest, and Gorgon's Release. After Medusa died at the hands of Perseus, Stheno and Euryale retrieved her head; she got a piece of her sisters' immortality and was put into stasis. In the 21st century, Euryale ignores Stheno's warnings and makes a deal with the Olympians-a bargain that restores the Gorgons' originally beautiful selves before Athena turned them into the snake-haired monsters of legend. In exchange, Stheno, Euryale, and Medusa must hunt down an enemy who has been killing gods, fulfilling an ancient prophecy as they do so.
- The 2022 novel Stone Blind, by Natalie Haynes, is a retelling of the Medusa legend from multiple perspectives. The New York Times reviewer wrote, "the novel substitutes action-adventure for feminist tragedy, a point made clear in the opening pages. 'This particular monster is assaulted, abused and vilified. And yet, as the story is always told, she is the one you should fear,' Haynes announces in her fierce yet conversational style. 'We'll see about that.'”
- The 2023 novel Medusa's Sisters, by Lauren J. A. Bear, retells Medusa's story from her sisters Stheno's and Euryale's switching points of view. The novel begins with the triplet sisters' birth and childhood struggles to maintain ties with their immortal monstrous family, an impossible feat due to the trio's normal appearance and Medusa's own mortality. Abandoned at a young age, the three sisters grow up fending for themselves. Wanting to fit in and express themselves, Stheno, Euryale, and Medusa move to the human realm, encountering other Greek mythology characters before settling in Athens. Stheno takes kithara lessons; Euryale befriends and secretly observes prostitutes and their clients in her wish to become Poseidon's lover; Medusa becomes a priestess of Athena. But in a twist to her original portrayal, Athena has been secretly seducing her own priestesses, including Medusa. Bitter over his loss to become Athens' patron god, Poseidon takes advantage of Athena's secret to rape Medusa and mock his niece for her hypocrisy. In this version, Athena transforms Stheno, Euryale, and Medusa into the Gorgons to prevent them from telling humans about her secret love affairs. To avoid petrifying their mortal friends, the cursed sisters exile themselves to Sarpedon where Stheno and Euryale then narrate of their and Medusa's new lives as Gorgons and the aftermath of her decapitation by Perseus.
- Euryale is a major character, and Stheno a minor antagonist, in the Celestine Chronicles by Cebelius. After their exile to Celestine, a world where the major pantheons of Earth were banished after the rise of Christianity, Stheno associated with Thomas the Dust Lord (The Apostle Thomas, also known as Doubting Thomas, from the New Testament - the first Template) and Euryale hid herself away deep underground to mourn her lost sister Medusa. Euryale is saved from her bitterness by Terrence "Terry" Mack, the main protagonist of the series, and adventures with him to the conclusion of the story.
- The 2025 novel "I, Medusa" by Ayana Gray is a retelling of Medusa's origins that reimagines her as a young woman punished by the gods. It explores themes of injustice, power, and agency.

=== Theatre ===
- Choreographer Sidi Larbi Cherkaoui created a one-act ballet titled Medusa for The Royal Ballet, with Natalia Osipova originating the title role. The ballet premiered in 2019.
- In 2022, OperaQ launched Medusa's Children, an LGBT-themed opera centered on Chrysaor and Pegasus as their aunts raise them in the aftermath of Medusa's rape and murder by Poseidon.
- In 2024, Megan Tripaldi wrote Gorgons, a play about Stheno and Euryale discovering their own identities a century after Medusa's death; the script can be read entirely on The Playwrights' Center's website.
- In 2026, Lydia Steier and Iain Bell directed and composed Medusa, an opera that retells and expands the original myth.

=== Toys ===
- The fall 2026 offering in the Four Horsemen's Figura Obscura line was Medusa, with a shattered Greek soldier statue as an accessory.
- Medusa was figure #22 in the Funko POP! "Myths" subset.
- Lego released a Medusa as part of Series 10 of their blind-bagged Minifigures.
- In Monster High, Deuce Gorgon is the son of Medusa, while his cousin, Viperine Gorgon, is the daughter of Stheno.
- Medusa appeared in Series 1 of the 1990 Monster in My Pocket line from Matchbox.
- Safari Ltd. produced a solid PVC figurine of Medusa in 202 as part of their Mythic Realms line.
- Boss Fight Studio's Vitruvian H.A.C.K.S. line features Medusa, Stheno, and Euryale, as well as other snake-themed, generic gorgons who were turned from normal humans by Stheno's bite.

=== Internet ===
The Russian- and English-language independent news website Meduza is named after Medusa, though using the Russian version of her name (Медуза) as the website was originally for a Russian speaking audience (the English version of the website was not set up until later).
