= Dejan Ognjanović (author) =

Serbian horror author, literary critic, film critic, editor and a translator

Dejan Ognjanovic
- Born: January 30, 1973 (age 53); Niš, SFR Yugoslavia
- Occupations: Writer, Literary critic, Film critic, Editor, Translator
- Writing career
- Period: 1996–present
- Genre: Horror fiction
- Website: cultofghoul.blogspot.com

Dejan Ognjanović (born January 30, 1973) is a contemporary Serbian horror author, literary critic, film critic, editor and a translator. He was the first in Serbia, and the Balkans, to write a doctoral dissertation on poetics of the horror genre. He was The Bram Stoker Award finalist in the category Short non-fiction (2022). He is a regular contributor to Rue Morgue magazine since 2010.

Ognjanović's research interests include English and American Literature, History of Literature, Literary Theory, Short Story, and especially the horror genre in Anglo-American literature and film.

== Biography ==
Dejan Ognjanović was born in Niš, on January 30, 1973, in Serbia, at the time a part of the Socialist Federal Republic of Yugoslavia.

He got his B.A. in English Language and Literature at the Faculty of Philosophy, Niš, Serbia in 1996. At the same place he got his M.A. in American Literature by defending his M.A. Thesis Gothic Motifs in the Works of Edgar Allan Poe in 2009.

In 2012, Ognjanović earned a Ph.D. in Anglo-American Literature at the Faculty of Philology, Belgrade, Serbia with a Ph.D. thesis titled Historical Poetics of Horror Genre in Anglo-American Literature.

Dejan Ognjanović worked at the Faculty of Philosophy in Niš, as a teaching assistant, at the Department of English studies, on the subject of American literature. He worked there for ten years, from 1999 to 2009.

Ognjanović is an alumnus of the Junior Faculty Development Program (JFDP) through American Councils for International Education. Thanks to their grant, he spent two semesters (Fall 2003 – Spring 2004) as a visiting scholar at UC Berkeley, California, USA, at the courses relevant for American studies.

After problems that Ognjanović had with his professor and mentor, he had to leave his job at the Faculty of Philosophy in Niš in 2009.

Currently, Ognjanović is an independent scholar and editor at Orfelin Publishing (Novi Sad, Serbia) where he edits the series "Poetics of Horror", which includes translations of some works, extensive afterwords for each book, biographies and bibliographies of selected authors, etc.

== Writing ==
=== Fiction ===
Ognjanović considers writing horror fiction his primary vocation. In Serbia he has published three novels and a collection of stories.

Naživo (In Vivo, 2003) is a brutal and dark tale about the resonances of the war violence from Bosnia and Kosovo in a „peaceful“ environment of sanctions-bound and depraved Interzone called Serbia. Politics, war, snuff, occult, underground cinema and pornography are merged in a gruesome tale of a young man's search for meaning in the middle of chaos.

Ognjanović's second novel, Zavodnik (The Seducer, 2014) brings a change of pace: it is an atmospheric folk-horror Serbian rendition of Henry James's The Turn of the Screw, about a young teacher brought into a mostly deserted and dead village in the mountains to teach a couple of orphans under the care of their grandma. However, it seems that their much-maligned father is not quite dead...

Prokletije (The Damned Mountains, 2021) is Ognjanović's third novel, a semi-sequel to Naživo, whose protagonist has a significant role in a plot which enlarges the neo-mythology of the first novel. The end of the 1990s in the territory of the former Yugoslavia: one battlefield is dying down in Bosnia, while another, in the South of Serbia (i.e. Kosovo), is slowly starting to smolder...A group of veterans is on a special mission leading them into the heart of the nearly impassable Prokletije mountain range, where the Human, the Subhuman and the Superhuman intertwine... Ognjanović's short stories and novellas have been published in many Serbian magazines, journals and book anthologies. So far, none of Ognjanović's fiction has been published in English.

=== Non-Fiction ===
Ognjanović's essays in English were published in the books edited by Steven Schneider:100 European Horror Films (British Film Institute, London, 2007), on Déjà vu, 1987); 501 Movie Directors (Quintessence / Barron's, London / New York City, 2007), on Alejandro Jodorowsky, Goran Marković, James Whale, Jan Svankmajer, Kaneto Shindo, Kim Ki Duk and Sogo Ishii; 101 Horror Movies You Must See Before You Die (Quintessence / ABC Books, London/Sydney, 2009) on Mask of the Demon, Suspiria, The Abominable Dr Phibes, The Beyond, The Devil Rides Out, The Exorcist, The Masque of the Red Death and The Wicker Man; 101 SF Movies You Must See Before You Die (Quintessence / ABC Books, London/Sydney, 2009) on Blade Runner, Stalker, The Terminator and RoboCop; 101 Gangster Movies You Must See Before You Die (Quintessence / ABC Books, London/Sydney, 2009) on Dillinger, and 101 War Movies You Must See Before You Die (Quintessence / ABC Books, 2009) on Tora! Tora! Tora! and Ballad of a Soldier.

Ognjanović's essay Genre Films in Recent Serbian Cinema was published in a bilingual collection Uvođenje mladosti / Youth Rising (Filmski Centar Srbije, Beograd, 2008); it is also available in the special edition of the web magazine KinoKultura br. 8 (in English).

Ognjanović's essays were also published in academic collections.

His paper Why Is the Tension So High? The Monstrous Feminine in (Post)Modern Slasher Films is in Speaking Of Monsters: A Teratological Anthology (Caroline Joan S. Picart and John Edgar Browning, eds.), Palgrave Macmillan, London, 2012.

Ognjanović's essay Welcome to the Reality Studio: Serbian Hand-Held Horrors is in Digital Horror: Haunted Technologies, Network Panic and the Found Footage (Xavier Aldana Reyes, Linnie Blake, eds.) (IB Tauris, 2015).

His first book in English is The Weird World of H.P. Lovecraft (Rue Morgue, 2017).

Ognjanović writes book and film reviews and articles for Rue Morgue magazine since 2010.

Ognjanović's interviews with the genre greats (i.e. Christopher Lee, Stuart Gordon, Jaume Balaguero, Sergio Stivaletti) were published in Horror Movie Heroes (Rue Morgue Library, Vol 2; 2014).

He used to write book and film reviews and interviews on several, now mostly defunct websites in English, such as Kung Fu Cult Cinema, Twitch, Beyond Hollywood, Unearthed and Quiet Earth.

=== In Serbian ===
In Serbia, Ognjanović has published five non-fiction books. Three studies:

- Faustovski ekran: đavo na filmu / Faustian Screen: Devil in Cinema (Zaječar: Svetozar Marković, 2006).
- U brdima, horori: srpski film strave / In the Hills, the Horrors: Serbian Horror Cinema (Niš: NKC, 2007).
- Poetika horora / Poetics of Horror (Novi Sad: Orfelin, 2014).

He also published a collection of essays Studija strave / A Study in Terror (Pančevo: Mali Nemo, 2008), and a book-length interview-study devoted to Serbian film director and horror-film pioneer, Đorđe Kadijević, Više od istine: Kadijević o Kadijeviću / More Than Truth: Kadijević on Kadijević (Novi Sad: Orfelin, 2017).

In Serbia, Ognjanović has published over a hundred film reviews, essays and interviews since 1996, in numerous daily papers, magazines and cinema journals.

Ognjanović's film critiques, essays and articles were, also, translated to Slovenian and published in their leading cinema magazine Ekran.

== Subversive Serbia ==
He was a co-programmer (with Mitch Davis) of the program Subversive Serbia at the Fantasia Film Festival (Montreal, Canada, 08–28. July 2010). He made a selection of seven Serbian genre films, four recent and three older, which he personally introduced, did the Q&A's with their authors and gave a lecture on Serbian horror films (with film clips). He also wrote about those films for the festival's program.

During his stay he also gave several interviews in which he revealed the potentials and accomplishments of Serbian horrors, which was their most extensive and elaborate presentation anywhere outside of Serbia.

He was a staunch defender of the controversial A Serbian Film (2010); he did the English subtitles for the film and wrote its first ever review in English, for The Quiet Earth website.

Excerpts from his book devoted to Serbian horror cinema, In the Hills, the Horrors, were translated to Czech and published in the magazine for theory, history and aesthetics of cinema, Iluminace (3/2011) in November 2011.

== Festivals ==
Other than promoting his own books, Ognjanović has also held numerous public lectures and participated in panels, round tables, promotions, discussions and master classes with genre directors and actors in Serbia and elsewhere.

He is a regular participant at the Grossmann Film and Wine Festival (Ljutomer, Slovenia) since 2007. Among many lectures and presentations, he also had master classes with such names as Brian Yuzna, Richard Stanley, Simon Boswell, Harry Kumel, Sergio Stivaletti and others.

After Subversive Serbia at the Fantasia International Film Festival, he also presented Serbian horrors at the SLASH FILM FESTIVAL in Vienna (September 2011), where he introduced the screening of Variola vera and participated in a round table about subversion in cinema.

He also gave lectures at the KRATKOFIL film festival in Banjaluka, Republika Srpska, Bosnia in June 2009, and at FANTASTIC ZAGREB (6-10. July 2011 and 3. July 2012, Zagreb, Croatia) and at Refesticon (Bijelo Polje, Montenegro, June 2018).

Ognjanović has also participated at numerous genre festivals, manifestations and events in Serbia (Belgrade, Subotica, Niš, Zaječar etc.).

Dejan Ognjanović was program director of “Slaughter: The Art Horror Film Festival” which took place in Doljevac, Serbia, July 1–3. 2022. It was an attempt to separate horror films of confrontation from horror films of escapism and show the former to an audience which would not otherwise be aware of them. The festival took place on the site of a defunct slaughterhouse, now renovated and turned into a place for all kinds of cultural and artistic activities.

== Editor ==
In Serbia, Ognjanović has edited H. P. Lovecraft's best stories in Serbian, titled Nekronomikon, Beograd: Everest Media, 2008; 2nd expanded edition 2012; the ultimate edition Orfelin, Novi Sad, 2018. He translated many of the tales and accompanied them with his introductions, a lengthy afterword, annotated bibliography, Lovecraft's biography, etc.

Ognjanović had also co-edited (with Ivan Velisavljević) Novi kadrovi: skrajnute vrednosti srpskog filma / New Frames: Hidden Gems of Serbian Cinema (Beograd: Clio, 2008), offering fresh insights into neglected authors, tendencies and (sub)genres of Serbian cinema.

He is editing a series of books called Poetics of Horror for a Serbian publisher, Orfelin publishing. It aims to represent the very best in horror fiction which hasn't yet been translated into Serbian. Between 2014 and 2022 he has selected, annotated, partially translated and wrote afterwords for:

- Algernon Blackwood's - The Willows,
- Howard Phillips Lovecraft's - The Whisperer in Darkness,
- M. R. James's - Whistle and I'll Come to You,
- Robert Aickman's - Cold Hand in Mine,
- Shirley Jackson's - The Haunting of Hill House,
- Sheridan Le Fanu's - Carmilla and Other Tales of Terror,
- Arthur Machen's - The Great God Pan,
- Thomas Ligotti’s - Grimscribe: His Lives and Works,
- Algernon Blackwood's - Ancient Lights,
- William Hope Hodgson's - "The Voice in the Night",
- Howard Phillips Lovecraft's - At the Mountains of Madness,
- Robert Aickman's - The Wine-Dark Sea and
- Roland Topor's - The Tenant.
- Thomas Ligotti’s - Noctuary
- H. H. Ewers' - Spider and other Terrors
- T.E.D. Klein's - Dark Gods
- Howard Phillips Lovecraft's - The Nameless City
- Henry James's - The Turn of the Screw
- Poppy Z. Brite's - Wormwood
- Bram Stoker's - Dracula's Guest
- Jean Ray's - Malpertuis
- Stefan Grabinski's - Dark Landscapes
- Algernon Blackwood's - The Man Whom the Trees Loved
- Thomas Ligotti's - Teatro Grottesco
- Vernon Lee's - The Phantom Lover
- Arthur Conan Doyle's - The Parasite
- Howard Phillips Lovecraft's - The Dream Quest of Unknown Kadath
- Robert W. Chambers' - The Yellow Sign
- Jean Ray's - Cruise of Shadows

== Translator ==
Ognjanović has published numerous translations from English, mostly of horror literature, including tales by H. P. Lovecraft, Algernon Blackwood, M. R. James, Arthur Machen and W. H. Hodgson, and a novel by Shirley Jackson.

He is also working on translations from Serbian into English (screenplays, dialogue lists, synopses, director's statements, subtitles, etc.).

Ognjanović has also translated Richard Corben’s albums Haunt of Horror: E. A. Poe and Haunt of Horror: H. P. Lovecraft (Darkwood, Belgrade, 2014).

== Comics essays ==
Ognjanović is also writing about comics. He regularly writes afterwords and essays for the publisher Veseli četvrtak, especially for their editions of Dylan Dog, Martin Mystere and Zagor.

Ognjanović also wrote afterwords for Serbian editions of Alberto Breccia’s albums Myths of Cthulhu and Mort Cinder (Darkwood, Belgrade, 2018).

== Artwork ==
Dejan Ognjanović did the artwork for the short comic (16 pages) Transcendence, adapted by Edward Lee and John Pelan from their own same-titled story. Published by Necro Publications in 2003, this edition also contains the original story and a gallery of four horror artworks by Ognjanović unrelated to the comic. It was published in 52 hardcover signed copies and 1000 soft cover copies.

Ognjanović's two artworks were used as illustrations in the first issue of the US magazine Vastarien (2018).

His artworks can also be seen on his blog The Cult of Ghoul.

== Blogging ==
Ognjanović writes on his Serbian blog The Cult of Ghoul (2009–present) This blog mostly covers horror films, old and new, but also books, comics, events, etc. It has about 1000 daily visits, and had over 5.5 million visits since its inception in 2009.

Ognjanović has also had a blog in English – The Temple of Ghoul (2010–2014), with a similar profile and slight bent towards Asian horror cinema. His most popular and widespread article was his (highly critical) review of Guillermo del Toro's script for At the Mountains of Madness.

After four years he stopped writing for it due to lack of time.

== Awards ==
In Serbia, Ognjanović has been awarded several awards. He received an award for best literary criticism by the literary magazine Gradina (Niš) in 2004; an award for best literary essay by the literary magazine Ulaznica (Zrenjanin), 2005 and 2006, for best book-length theoretical work ('Svetozar Marković', Zaječar) in 2006.

Ognjanović has also been a top contender (among top three) for the prestigious Nikola Milošević award, for non-fiction book in Serbian, for his Poetics of Horror in 2015.

For his articles on Lovecraft and Frankenstein from Rue Morgue magazine he was nominated for the "Rondo Award", twice (2016 and 2017). Both times, Ognjanović has got an "honourable mention" (top five).

In 2022. Dejan Ognjanović was The Bram Stoker Award finalist in the category Short non-fiction, for his essay “The Three Paradigms of Horror” (Vastarien, Vol. 4, No. 2, 2021).
