= The City of Unspeakable Fear =

1943 novel by Jean Ray

- Author: Jean Ray
- Original title: La Cité de l'indicible peur
- Translator: Scott Nicolay
- Language: French
- Genre: horror novel
- Publisher: Les Auteurs Associés
- Publication date: 1943
- Publication place: Belgium
- English publication date: 2023
- Pages: 188

The City of Unspeakable Fear (French: La Cité de l'indicible peur) is a 1943 horror novel by the Belgian writer Jean Ray. It is a murder mystery set in an English small town, with elements of detective story, horror and parody.

It was first published in Belgium eight days after Ray's most famous work, the novel Malpertuis, in 1943. Both works were written while Ray was living in Ghent under Nazi occupation. The book was the basis for the 1964 film The Big Scare, directed by Jean-Pierre Mocky and starring Bourvil. It was translated by Scott Nicolay in 2023 and published in English as The City of Unspeakable Fear.

== Synopsis ==
The story follows a retired Scotland Yard officer, Sidney Terence Trigger ("Triggs"), who moves to the fictional town of Ingersham in Southeast England. Expecting to settle down into a tranquil rural life, he instead finds that the residents of Ingersham anticipate a "great fear" striking the town. A series of deaths and apparent supernatural incidents draw Triggs into the role of detective, trying to identify what is real in an environment of paranoia.
