= Malpertuis (film) =

1971 film

- Film poster
- Directed by: Harry Kümel
- Written by: Jean Ferry
- Based on: Malpertuis by Jean Ray
- Produced by: Paul Laffargue; Ritta Laffargue; Pierre Levie
- Starring: Orson Welles; Susan Hampshire; Michel Bouquet; Mathieu Carrière; Jean-Pierre Cassel; Daniel Pilon; Sylvie Vartan
- Cinematography: Gerry Fisher
- Edited by: Richard Marden
- Music by: Georges Delerue
- Production companies: Artemis Film; Les Productions Artistes Associés
- Distributed by: Premier Releasing; United Artists
- Release dates: 10 May 1972 (Cannes); 17 September 1972 (Stratford International Film Festival)
- Running time: 119 minutes
- Countries: Belgium; France; West Germany
- Languages: Dutch; French; English

Malpertuis (released in the United States as The Legend of Doom House) is a 1972 fantasy horror film directed by Harry Kümel, and starring Orson Welles, Susan Hampshire, Michel Bouquet, Mathieu Carrière, Jean-Pierre Cassel, Daniel Pilon, and Sylvie Vartan. It follows a young sailor who, upon returning to land, awakens to find himself trapped in Malpertuis, his family's isolated labyrinthine estate. It is based on the 1943 novel of the same name by Jean Ray.

Malpertuis was selected for the official selection and was presented "in competition" at the 1972 Cannes Film Festival, where it was screened in a truncated cut at the request of its distributor, United Artists.

A Flemish "director's cut" version was released in 1973.

== Plot ==
Jan (Mathieu Carrière), a young sailor, returns to land, and while searching for his childhood home, is mysteriously abducted. He awakens in an isolated old mansion called Malpertuis, where he find himself among various relatives, including his sister Nancy (Susan Hampshire), as well as a strange taxidermist and a resident madman called Lampernisse (Jean-Pierre Cassel). The mansion turns out to be a labyrinth of corridors, staircases, and secret chambers, belonging to his family.

His bedridden occultist uncle Cassavius (Orson Welles) is about to divide the estate among his heirs, but, as it turns out, only if they commit themselves never to leave the premises. They find themselves trapped in a mystery where they enact creatures from Greek mythology, which Cassavius believes them to be, while anyone who tries to escape is found horribly murdered. The plot remains obscure to the end, as Jan tries to unravel the mystery, and seems to spiral into a dreamlike madness.

== Cast ==
- Orson Welles as Cassavius
- Susan Hampshire as Nancy / Euryale / Alice (Alecto) / Nurse / Charlotte
- Michel Bouquet as Dideloo
- Mathieu Carrière as Jan
- Jean-Pierre Cassel as Lampernisse
- Daniel Pilon as Mathias Crook
- Walter Rilla as Eisengott
- Dora van der Groen as Sylvie Dideloo
- Charles Janssens as Philarette
- Sylvie Vartan as Bets

== Production ==
Principal photography of Malpertuis began in Belgium on 1 December 1971.

== Release ==
The English-language version of the film that premiered at the 1972 Cannes Film Festival ran 100 minutes, as it had been edited at the request of United Artists from the original version.

The film later screened at the 1972 Stratford International Film Festival in Ontario, Canada, on 17 September 1972.

It was subsequently edited further by other distributors. The Royal Belgian Film Archive, together with director Harry Kümel, worked to restore the uncut Flemish version of the film, which was released in 1973 as "the director's cut". This version is 20 minutes longer, containing scenes of the film which had been edited out. Although this version is more complete, the original voice of Orson Welles is missing from it.

=== Home media ===
Barrel Entertainment released Malpertuis on DVD on 24 July 2007, featuring both the truncated English-language cut and the original director's cut.

Radiance Films released a Blu-ray edition on 28 October 2025 featuring a new 4K restoration of the film supervised by the Royal Belgian Film Archive. The Blu-ray features both the truncated cut of the film that premiered at Cannes, as well as the original director's cut. This release was limited to 3,000 units.

== Reception ==
Neil Smith of the BBC gave the film 2/5 stars, calling it "Bizarre, lurid and baffling". Michael Barrett from PopMatters rated it 7/10 stars, calling it "ragged and dizzy, full of sharp zooms and frantic cuts." On his website Fantastic Movie Musings and Ramblings, Dave Sindelar called it "[a] disorienting, slightly disturbing and sometimes infuriating movie"

== See also ==
- Orson Welles filmography

== Sources ==
- Tuska, Jon (1991). Encounters with Filmmakers: Eight Career Studies. Westport, Connecticut: Greenwood Press. ISBN 978-0-313-26305-7.
