= Chicago Painter =

Ancient Greek vase painter

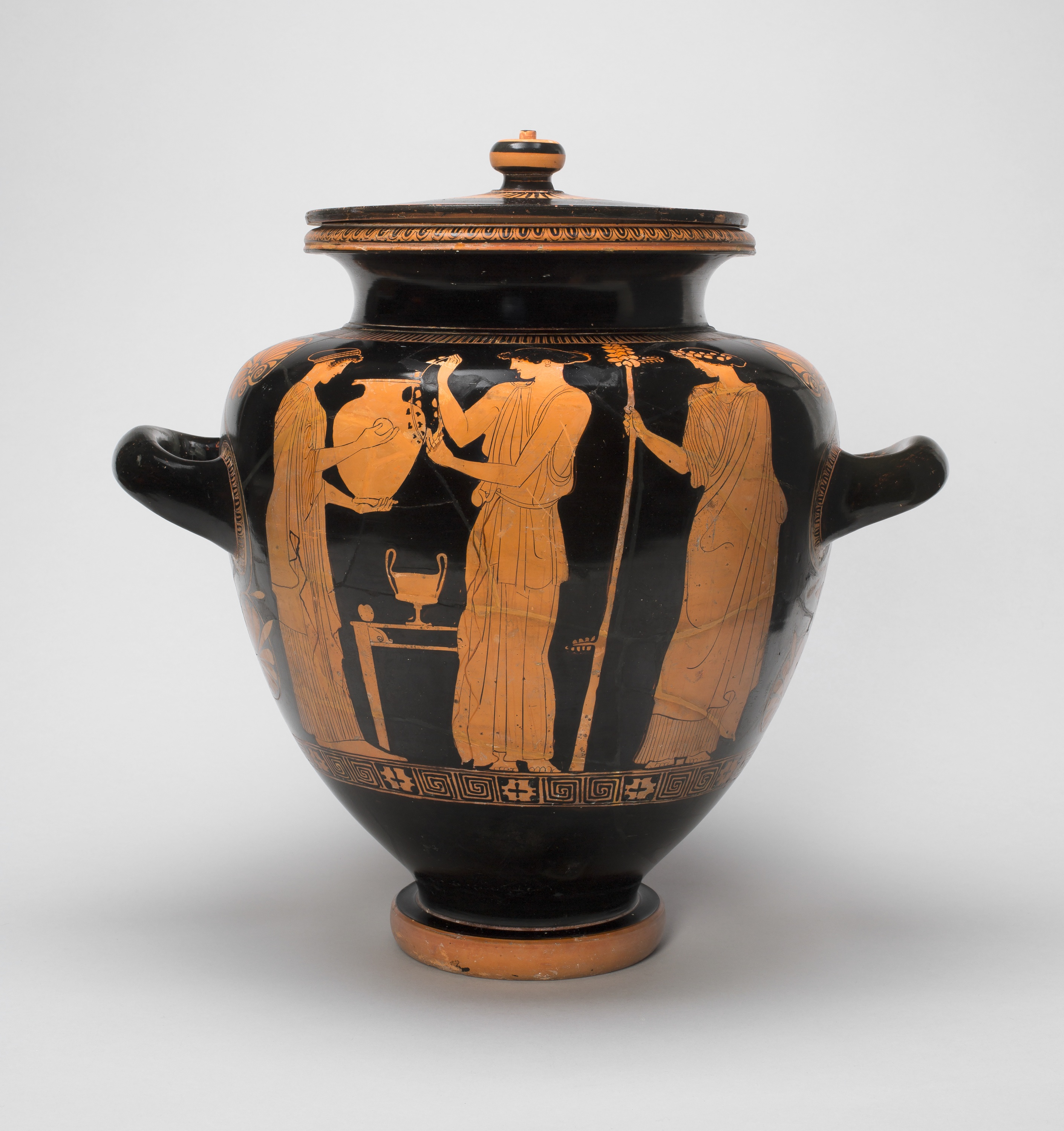
Name vase of the Chicago Painter, c. 450 BCE (Art Institute of Chicago)

The Chicago Painter was an ancient Greek vase painter, active in Athens in the middle of the 5th century BCE. His real name is unknown, but his style was recognized by the British classical archaeologist John Beazley, from whom he received his modern nickname. The name vase of the Chicago Painter is a stamnos acquired by the Art Institute of Chicago in 1889.

The Chicago Painter was first identified in Beazley's 1918 publication Attic Red-Figured Vases in American Museums, where he was called "Painter of the Chicago Stamnos". The name was shortened to the "Chicago Painter" a few years later. The Chicago Painter was a follower of another mid-5th century vase painter, the Villa Giulia Painter, whose style he continued in a form that Beazley described as "somewhat freer and tenderer" and "softer and more elegant". Most of the works attributed to him are medium-sized vases intended for carrying and mixing wine and water: stamnoi, pelikai, and hydriai. The stamnos at the Art Institute depicts scenes related to the cult of the wine god Dionysos, and exemplifies the painter's calm, elegant style.
