= Whiskey Tales =

1925 short story collection by Jean Ray

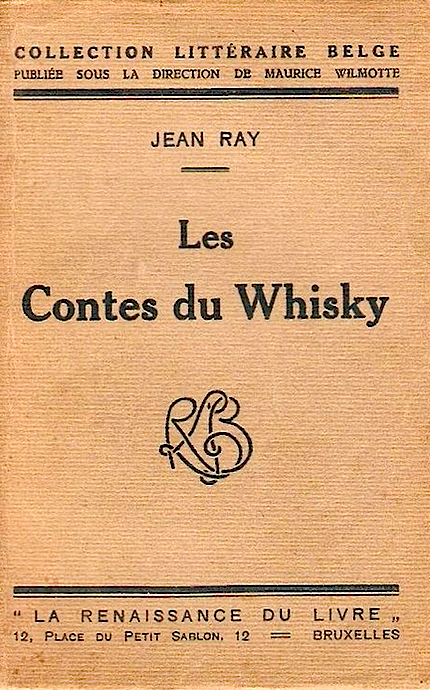
- Author: Jean Ray
- Original title: Les Contes du whisky
- Translator: Scott Nicolay
- Language: French
- Publisher: La Renaissance du livre
- Publication date: 1925
- Publication place: Belgium
- English publication date: 2019
- Pages: 217

Whiskey Tales (French: Les Contes du whisky) is a 1925 short story collection by the Belgian writer Jean Ray. It was Ray's first published book and the stories are speculative fiction.

The book was published by La Renaissance du livre in 1925 and became Ray's first breakthrough, leading to comparisons to Edgar Allan Poe. It was published in Scott Nicolay's English translation in 2019.

== Contents ==
- "Irish whiskey"
- "At midnight"
- "The name of the boat"
- "A Whitechapel fairy tale"
- "Herbert's fortune"
- "In the Fenn marshes"
- "One night in Camberwell"
- "Belovéd little wife with the scent of Verbena"
- "Poppelreiter's salmon"
- "Over drinks"
- "Josuah Güllick, pawnbroker"
- "Vengeance"
- "My dead friend"
- "The crocodile"
- "A hand"
- "The last gulp"
