= Cruise of Shadows =

1931 short story collection by Jean Ray

- Author: Jean Ray
- Original title: La Croisière des ombres
- Translator: Scott Nicolay
- Language: French
- Publisher: Les Editions de Belgique
- Publication date: 1931
- Publication place: Belgium
- English publication date: 2019
- Pages: 227

Cruise of Shadows: Haunted Stories of Land and Sea (French: La Croisière des ombres : histoires hantées de terre et de mer) is a 1931 short story collection by the Belgian writer Jean Ray. It was Ray's second collection, written during a prison sentence he served from 1926 to 1929 for "misappropriation of funds".

It contains "The Gloomy Alley", one of Ray's most famous stories, which first was published in English in 1956 as "The Tenebrous Alley". Cruise of Shadows was published in English in 2019, translated by Scott Nicolay.

== Contents ==
- "The Horrifying Presence"
- "The End of the Street"
- "The Last Guest"
- "Dürer, the Idiot"
- "Mondschein-Dampfer"
- "The Gloomy Alley"
- "The Mainz Psalter"
