= Filip De Pillecyn =

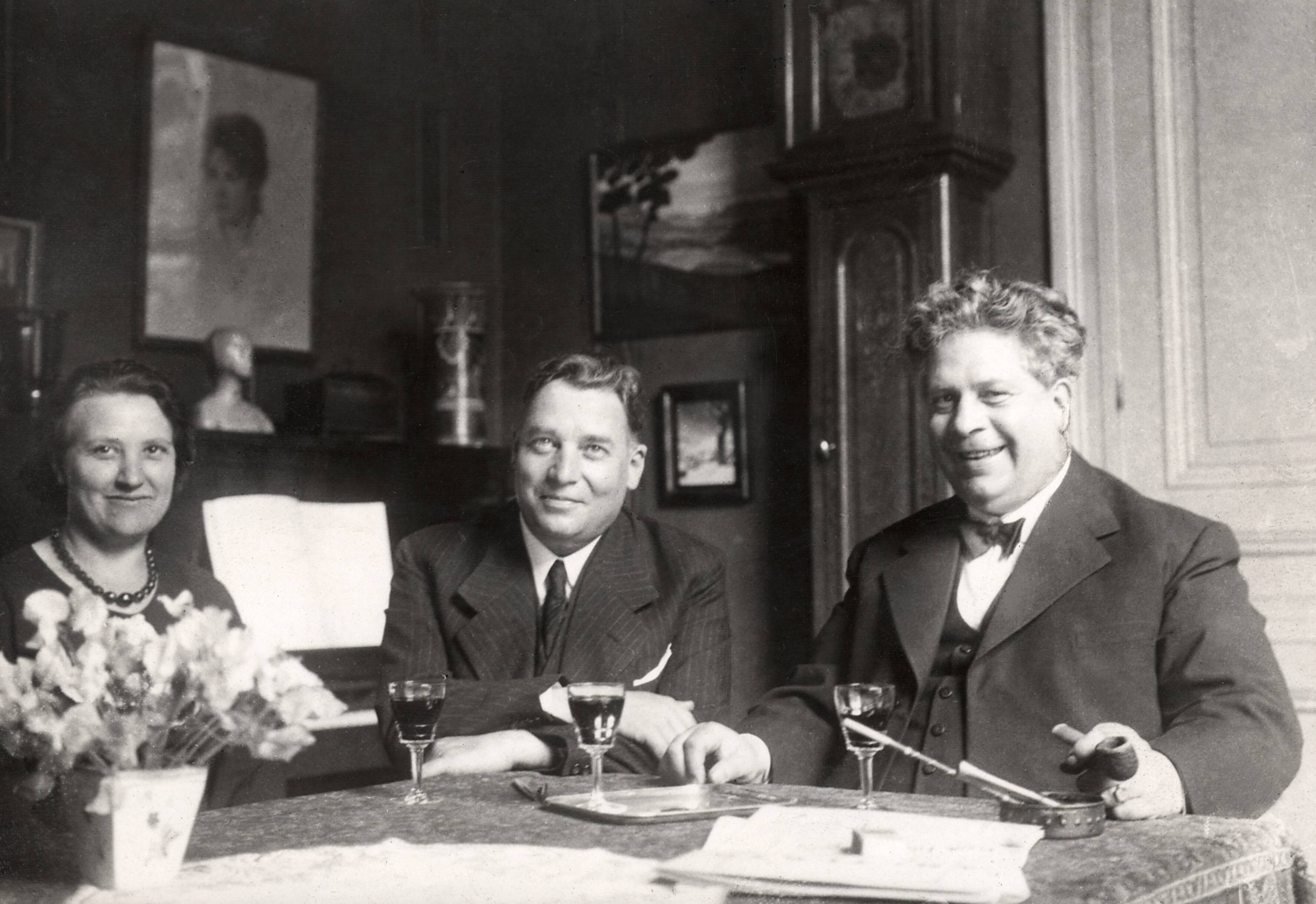
- De Pillecyn (middle); Felix Timmermans (right) and Marieke Janssens (left)
- Born: 25 March 1891; Hamme, Belgium
- Died: 7 August 1962 (aged 71); Ghent, Belgium
- Occupation: Writer
- Genre: Fiction, poetry, screenwriting

Filip De Pillecyn (25 March 1891 – 7 August 1962) was a Belgian writer, and a member of the Flemish movement. He was born at Hamme, and died in Ghent.

== Bibliography ==
=== Poetry ===
- Onder den hiel (1920) (with Jozef Simons)

=== Theatre ===
- Margaretha Van Eyck (1914)
- Dona Mirabella (1952)

=== Biography ===
- Pastor Denys (1927)
- Monseigneur Bermijn de Paulus van Ortosland (1929)
- Pater de Deken (1929)
- Renaat De Rudder (1931)

=== Essay ===
- Hugo Verriest (1926)
- Stijn Streuvels en zijn werk (1932)
- Het boek van St.-Niklaas (1935)
- Stijn Streuvels (1959)

=== Short stories ===
- De rit (1927)
- Monsieur Hawarden (1935)
- De aanwezigheid (1937)
- Schaduwen (1937)
- De boodschap (1946)
- Rochus (1951)
- Het boek van de man Job (1956)
- Elisabeth (1961)

=== Novels ===
- Pieter Fardé, de roman van een minderbroeder (1926)
- Blauwbaard (1931)
- Hans van Malmédy (1935)
- De soldaat Johan (1939)
- Jan Tervaert (1947)
- Mensen achter de dijk (1949)
- De veerman en de jonkvrouw (1950)
- Vaandrig Antoon Serjacobs (1951)
- Aanvaard het leven (1956)
- Face au mur (1979)

=== Essays ===
- Het process van den veiligheidsdienst (1920)
- Amnestie (?)
- De dief (1930, in Het Vlaamsche Kerstboek of Ons Volk Ontwaakt)
- Gedecoreerd met de ster van Bethlehem (1935)
- Heldenhude in Vlaanderen (1938)
- Het hart met zeven zwaarden (?)
- Aan Schelde en Durme, het soete land van Waas (1939)
- Twistgesprek tussen Demer en Schelde (1956) (together with Ernest Claes)
- Hugo Verriest (1959)
- Het was toen (1972)
- Kiespijn der ziel : unpublished journalism(1981)

== See also ==
- Flemish literature
