= The Arrival of Joachim Stiller =

1976 film

- Theatrical release poster
- Directed by: Harry Kümel
- Release date: 1976
- Running time: 153 minutes
- Country: Belgium
- Language: Dutch

The Arrival of Joachim Stiller (Dutch: De Komst van Joachim Stiller) is a 1976 Belgian film directed by Harry Kümel based on the book of the same name. It originally aired as three 50-minute episodes in Flanders. The Dutch broadcast it as one part, cutting out 45 minutes. Harry Kümel made a cinematic version of 110 minutes. The Flemish DVD release edits the three original TV episodes into one film with a runtime of 153 minutes at the request of the director, and includes Dutch, French and English subtitles.
