= The Coming of Joachim Stiller =

1960 novel by Hubert Lampo

- Title page for The Coming of Joachim Stiller (1974 English language edition)
- Author: Hubert Lampo
- Original title: De komst van Joachim Stiller
- Translator: Marga Emlyn-Jones
- Language: Flemish
- Publication date: 1960
- Publication place: Belgium
- English publication date: 1974

The Coming of Joachim Stiller (Dutch: De komst van Joachim Stiller) is a novel by the Belgian author Hubert Lampo, first published in 1960. It deals with the coming and death of Joachim Stiller, a messiah-like figure, and has magical-realist elements in it. An English translation by Marga Emlyn-Jones was published in 1974. A film based on the novel was made in 1976.

== Plot summary ==
The main character in the novel is Freek Groenevelt, a 37-year-old journalist living in Antwerp. From a café, he witnesses four workers breaking up a street and then closing it up again, for no apparent reason. When he decides to write an article about the event, he is contacted by a member of the Antwerp city council, Mr. Keldermans.

Mr. Keldermans explains to Groenevelt that things are happening which he does not understand and make him afraid. Groenevelt is sceptical at first, but Keldermans seems honest and Groenevelt leaves in a state of confusion.

He then receives a letter from Joachim Stiller, in which Stiller announces that the event he witnessed is a portent. To Groenevelt's confusion, the letter is stamped one and a half years before he was born.

Later on, Groenevelt goes to visit the editors of a literary magazine, "Atomium", which has published a very critical article about him. One of the editors, Simone Marijnissen, explains that they have received a letter from, again, Joachim Stiller, asking them not to criticize Groenevelt. They thought that Groenevelt had written the letter himself and saw this as a reason to attack him.

Over the next few days, Joachim Stiller continues to manifest himself. He writes another letter to Marijnissen, and Groenevelt finds a 16th-century book, written by a German theologian from Augsburg called Joachim Stiller. Groenevelt and Marijnissen (who are fast falling in love with each other) visit an art historian, who determines that the letter is thirty-eight years old: again, just one year older than Groenevelt. A graphologist determines that Stiller's handwriting is exactly what he would expect from a man "who doesn't exist at all, but could nonetheless write".

Marijnissen spends the night in Groenevelt's apartment, and they are awakened by the sounds of a carillon, which nobody else seems to hear. Then, the telephone rings, and an unknown person promises: "One day I will free you from all your fears."

Then, as persistent rumours announcing the end of the world start to run around the city, Groenevelt contacts Keldermans, who explains that these rumours have been spread by people unknown. He had detailed some police officers to keep things quiet, but these have disappeared without a trace.

Groenevelt, now understandably nervous, visits a psychiatrist, but apart from high blood pressure, nothing seems to be wrong. He does remember an episode from his early youth, when he witnessed a rocket attack in the Second World War. An American soldier was mortally wounded in the attack, and suddenly Groenevelt remembers the GI's name: Major Joachim Stiller, Longwood, Massachusetts.

When Groenevelt comes home, Marijnissen tells him she is expecting their child. Furthermore, a letter from Joachim Stiller has arrived, telling them that he will arrive on Friday evening.

On Friday evening, Groenevelt and Marijnissen go to the train station, where they meet Keldermans. At half past nine, a man comes out of the station, whom Groenevelt recognises as the American soldier from his youth. The man smiles, and says: "I am Joachim Stiller", but immediately after that he is hit by a truck. Later, at the police station, it proves impossible to identify the man.

Three days later, when Groenevelt and Marijnissen try to visit Stiller's body, it has disappeared. Keldermans's connection with Joachim Stiller is also revealed: his daughter has died in the same attack that Groenevelt has witnessed.
