= Monsieur Hawarden =

1969 film

- Theatrical release poster
- Directed by: Harry Kümel
- Written by: Jan Blokker; Filip De Pillecyn
- Produced by: Rob du Mee; André Thomas
- Starring: Ellen Vogel
- Cinematography: Eduard van der Enden
- Release dates: 1968 (Belgium); 20 March 1969 (Netherlands)
- Running time: 109 minutes
- Countries: Belgium; Netherlands
- Language: Dutch

Monsieur Hawarden is a 1968 Belgian-Dutch drama film directed by Harry Kümel. The film was selected as the Dutch entry for the Best Foreign Language Film at the 42nd Academy Awards, but was not accepted as a nominee.

The film is an adaptation of Filip De Pillecyn's short story Monsieur Hawarden (1935) and Henri Pierre Faffin's novel Monsieur Hawarden (1932), both of which were inspired by an actual nineteenth century diary.

== Plot ==
Meriora Gillibrand disguises herself as a man ('Monsieur Hawarden') to avoid prosecution for murdering her lover fifteen years ago. She is the last living member of a wealthy Vienna family, and has spent the years after the murder traveling Europe with Victorine, her female servant. Her travels provide her with an anonymous cloak that allows her freedom of movement but little peace of mind. Nearing middle age, the guilt and weariness of an empty life has her contemplating suicide as the only way out of her dilemma.

== Cast ==
- Ellen Vogel as Monsieur Hawarden / Meriora Gillibrand
- Hilde Uitterlinden as Victorine
- Joan Remmelts as Rentmeester Deschamps
- Dora van der Groen as Mw. Deschamps
- Xander Fisher as Axel, zoon van Rentmeester
- Senne Rouffaer as Officier
- Marielle Fiolet as Dienstmeisje
- John Lanting as Walter, een bediende
- Carola Gijsbers van Wijk as Corien, een dienstmeisje
- Beppie Blokker as Emma, de kokkin
- Ernie Damen as Hans, een bediende
- Jan Blokker as Man met lantaarnplaatjes

== Reception ==
The film was not a great commercial success upon its release. It received critical accolades, including prizes at festivals in Chicago, Edinburgh and Hyeres.

== See also ==
- List of submissions to the 42nd Academy Awards for Best Foreign Language Film
- List of Dutch submissions for the Academy Award for Best Foreign Language Film
