= Stheno and Euryale =

Sisters of the Gorgon Medusa

Stheno and Euryale chase Perseus after he slew Medusa, Attic black-figure kyathos by Theseus Painter, Getty Museum.

In Greek mythology, Stheno (/ˈsθiːnoʊ, ˈsθɛnoʊ/; Ancient Greek: Σθενώ, romanized: Sthenṓ, lit. 'forceful') and Euryale (/jʊəˈraɪəli/ yuu-RY-ə-lee; Ancient Greek: Εὐρυάλη, romanized: Euryálē, lit. 'far-roaming') were two of the three sister Gorgons, the third being Medusa, who were able to turn anyone who looked at them to stone. Unlike the mortal Medusa, both Stheno and Euryale were immortal. When Perseus beheaded Medusa, the two Gorgons pursued him but were unable to catch him.

== Family ==
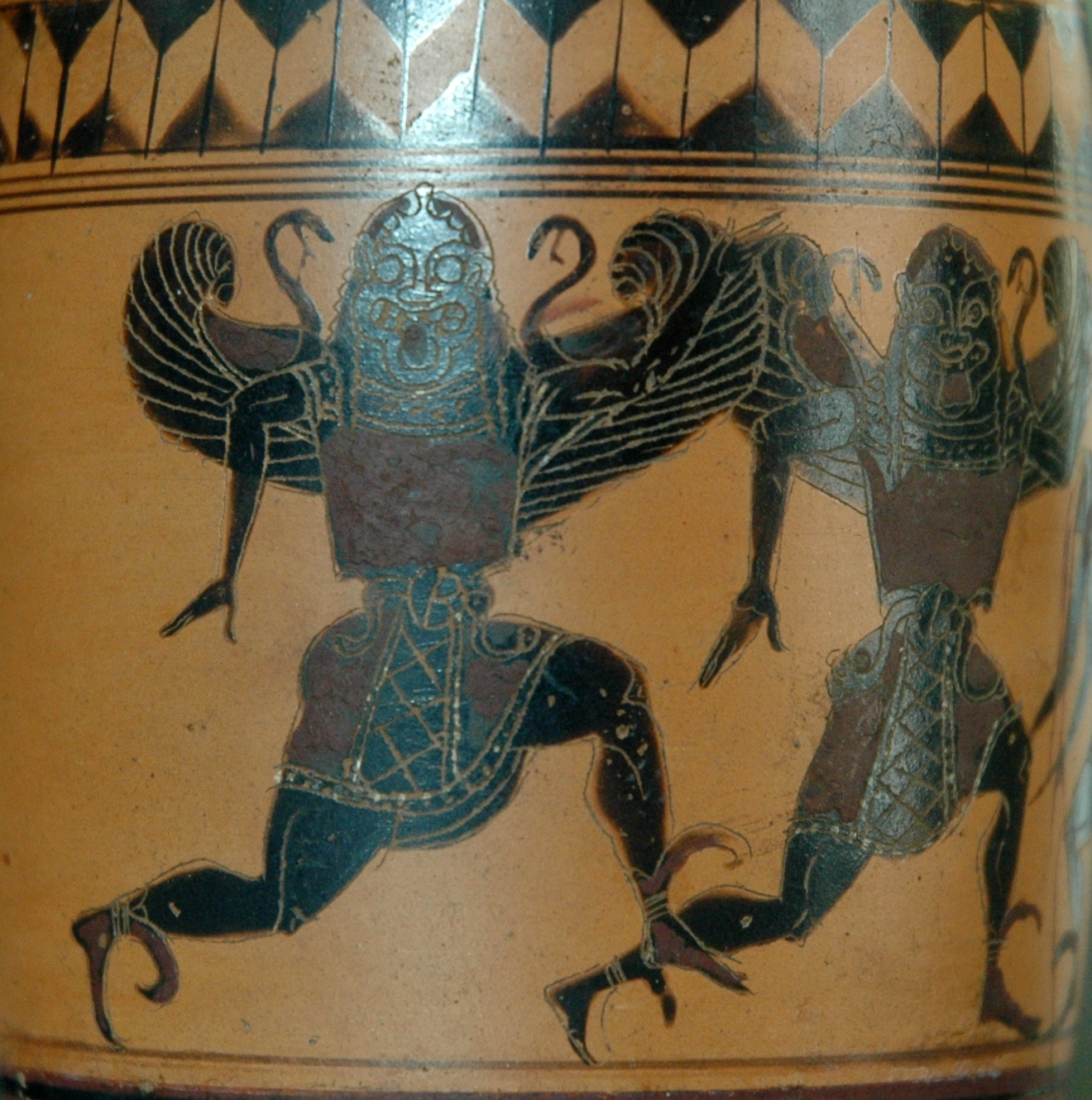
The Gorgons Stheno and Euryale chasing Perseus; Attic black-figure lekythos, Cabinet des Medailles 277 (550–500 BC)

According to Hesiod, and Apollodorus, Stheno and Euryale, along with Medusa, were daughters of the primordial sea-god Phorcys and the sea-monster Ceto, while, according to Hyginus, they were daughters of "the Gorgon", an offspring of Typhon and Echidna, and Ceto.

== Mythology ==
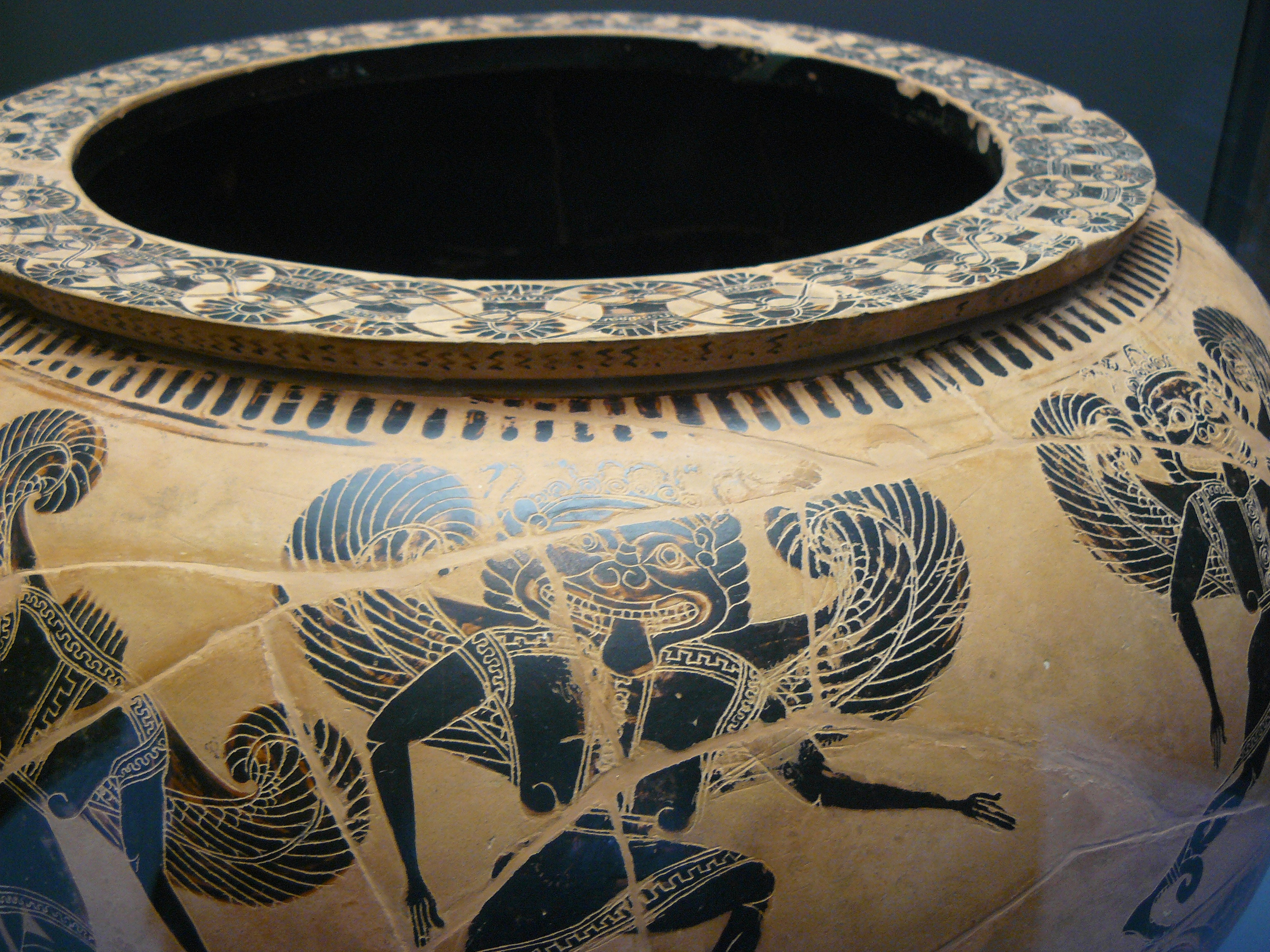
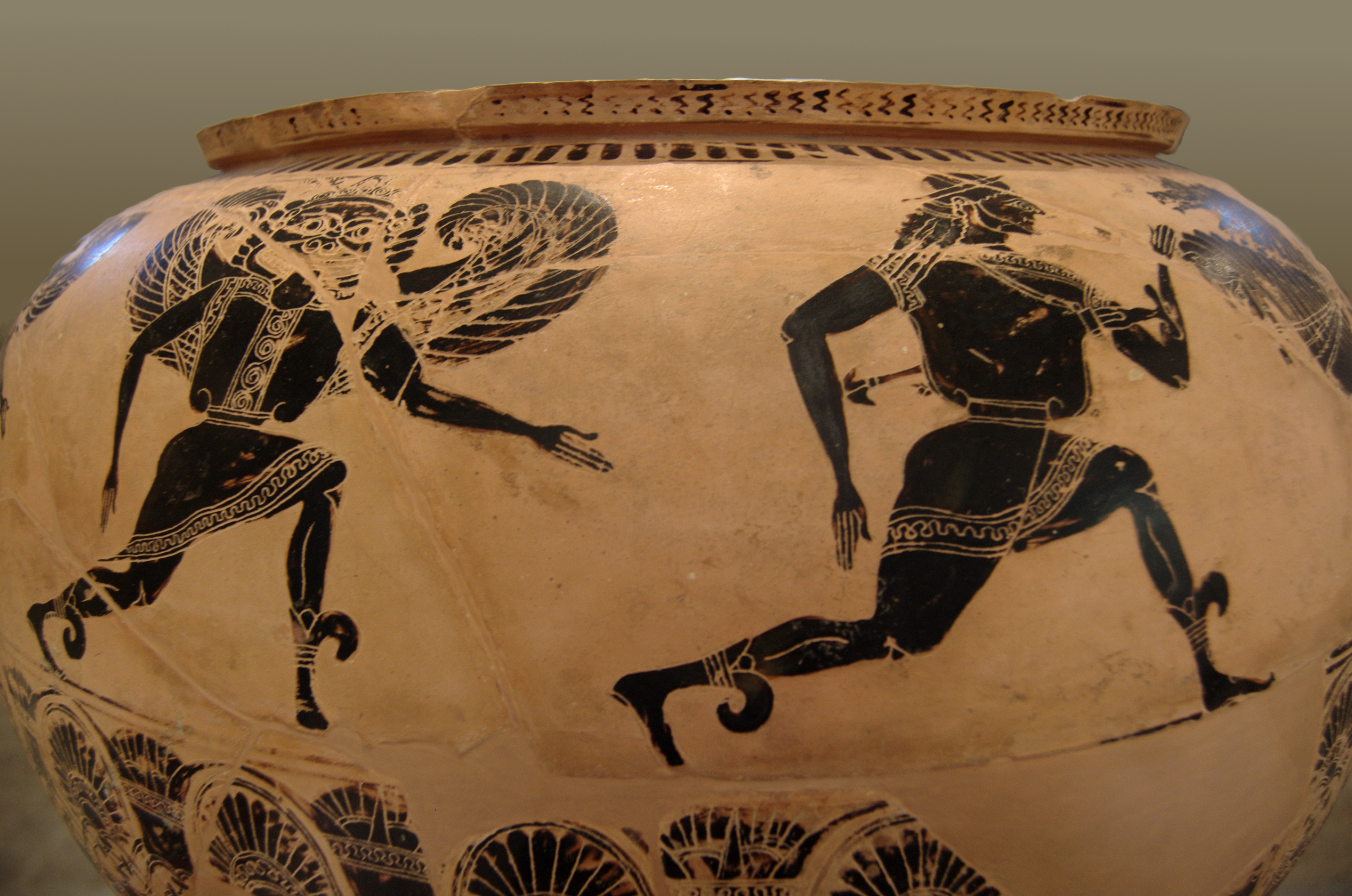
Two views of the same vase. Above: a headless Medusa on the left, with Stheno and Euryale running right. Below: the continuation of the scene showing Perseus running right. Dinos of the Gorgon Painter Louvre E874 (early sixth century BC)

The Gorgons Stheno and Euryale were immortal, whereas their Gorgon sister Medusa was mortal. The only story involving them is their pursuit of Perseus after he had beheaded Medusa. The Hesiodic Shield of Heracles (c. late seventh – mid sixth century BC) describes the two Gorgons' pursuit of Perseus, as depicted on Heracles' shield:

Perseus himself, Danae’s son, was outstretched, and he looked as though he were hastening and shuddering. The Gorgons, dreadful and unspeakable, were rushing after him, eager to catch him; as they ran on the pallid adamant, the shield resounded sharply and piercingly with a loud noise. At their girdles, two serpents hung down, their heads arching forward; both of them were licking with their tongues, and they ground their teeth with strength, glaring savagely. Upon the terrible heads of the Gorgons rioted great Fear.

While the "great Fear" rioting upon the heads of the Gorgon, in the passage from the Shield quoted above, might possibly be a vague reference to hair made of snakes, the poet Pindar makes such a physical feature explicit, describing the two Gorgons, just like their sister Medusa, as having "horrible snakey hair" (ἀπλάτοις ὀφίων κεφαλαῖς).

According to Apollodorus' version of their story, all three Gorgons had the ability to turn to stone anyone who looked upon them. And when Perseus managed to behead Medusa by looking at her reflection in his bronze shield, Stheno and Euryale chased after him, but were unable to see him because he was wearing Hades' cap, which made him invisible.

Euryale's lamenting cry, while chasing Perseus, is noted in two sources. Pindar has Athena create the "many-voiced songs of flutes" to imitate the "shrill cry" of the "fast-moving jaws of Euryale". While Nonnus, in his Dionysiaca, has the fleeing Perseus "listening for no trumpet but Euryale's bellowing".

== Iconography ==
The typical archaic (c. 8th–5th century BC) depictions of Stheno and Euryale, show their head turned to face the viewer, sitting (seemingly without a neck) atop a running body in profile, with wings on its back and curl-topped boots. In later depictions the heads shrink in size with respect to their bodies, possess necks, and become less wild-looking.

== See also ==
- Eleusis Amphora
- Gorgoneia
- Cultural depictions of Medusa and Gorgons
