= Hubert Lampo =

Flemish writer and journalist (1920–2006)

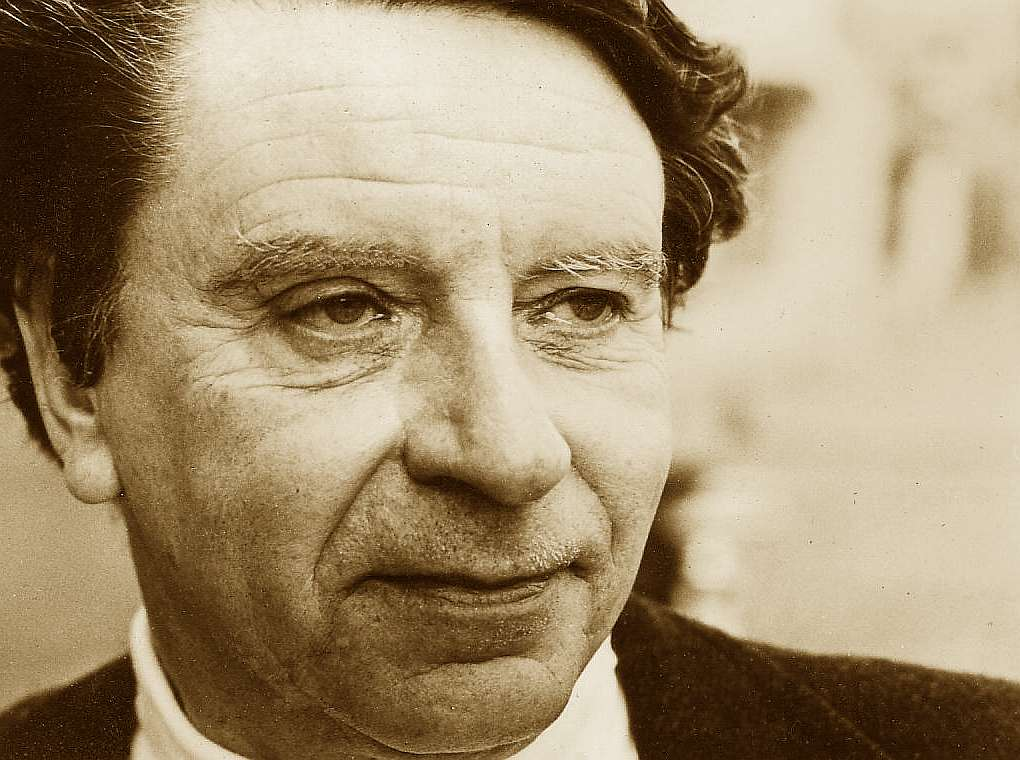
Hubert Lampo (photo Tom Ordelman)

Hubert Leon Lampo (Antwerp, 1 September 1920 – Essen, 12 July 2006) was a Flemish writer, one of the founders of magic realism in Flanders. His most famous book is De komst van Joachim Stiller ("The coming of Joachim Stiller", 1960), in which a mysterious person, named Joachim Stiller, appears as a redeemer, under circumstances reminiscent of the death of Jesus. Other themes that occur in Lampo's work are the myths of Orpheus, Atlantis and the Holy Grail.

== Bibliography (English) ==
- Hubert Lampo: Arthur and the Grail. Photogr. by Pieter Paul Koster. London, Sidgwick & Jackson, 1988. ISBN 0-283-99705-2
- Hubert Lampo: The coming of Joachim Stiller. Transl. by Marga Emlyn-Jones. New York, Twayne Publishers, 1974. ISBN 0-8057-3416-3
- Hubert Lampo: 'The contemporary novel in Dutch'. In: The contemporary novel in Belgium. Brussels, 1970. No ISBN

== See also ==
- Flemish literature
