= Harry Kümel =

Belgian film director

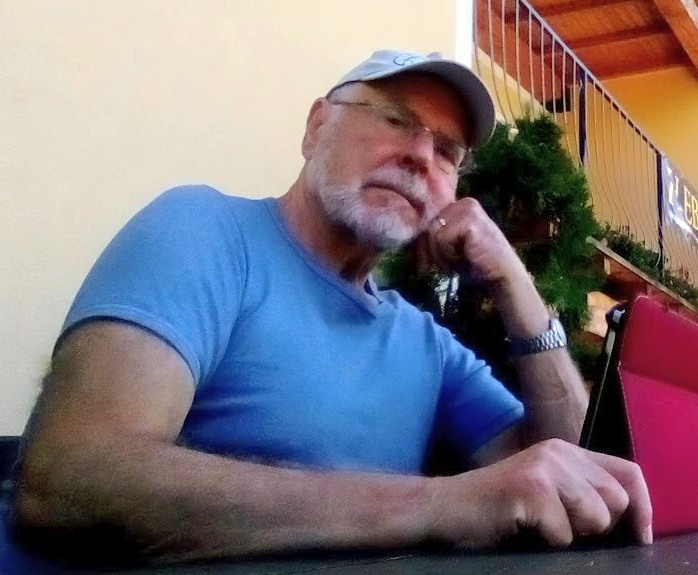
- Born: 27 January 1940 (age 86); Antwerp, Belgium
- Occupation: Film director

Harry Kümel (born 27 January 1940) is a Belgian film director.

His 1971 vampire feature Daughters of Darkness (French: Les lèvres rouges; "The Red Lips"), starring Delphine Seyrig, became a cult hit in Europe and the United States. He also directed the film version of Malpertuis (1971), featuring Orson Welles and adapted from the 1943 novel by Jean Ray.

He also directed Monsieur Hawarden (1969) about the cross-dressing Meriora Gillibrand whose two male lovers fought a duel in Vienna. She then killed the survivor and fled to Belgium dressed as a man. She took the name Hawarden from a family related to hers in Lancashire. The film is a fictionalised account; her grave can still be seen near Malmedy in the German-speaking part of Belgium.

He made a cameo appearance in several novels, including Nicholas Royle's Antwerp and Hubert Lampo's magic-realistic novel The Scent of Sandalwood.

From 1969 until the present, Kümel has taught cinema at several film institutes, including The Dutch Film and Television Academy – Amsterdam (NFTA), Institut des Arts de Diffusion – Brussels (IAD), Royal Institute for Theatre, Cinema and Sound – Brussels (RITS), and the Université libre de Bruxelles (ULB).

In 2014, Harry Kümel received the Gulden Mira (Golden Mira) award for his career from the Flemish Film Press Association.

== Filmography ==
- Erasmus (1962)
- Hendrik Conscience (1963)
- Waterloo (1964)
- De Grafbewaker (1965)
- Monsieur Hawarden (1969)
- Daughters of Darkness (1971)
- Malpertuis (1973)
- De Komst van Joachim Stiller (1976)
- The Paradise Lost (1978)
- The Secrets of Love (1985)
- Eline Vere (1991)
