= Jean Ray (author) =

Belgian writer

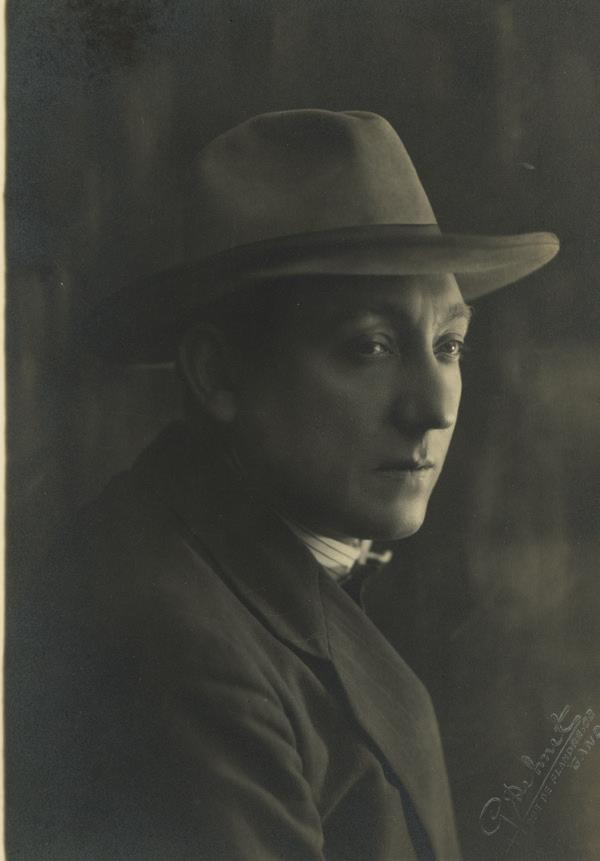
- Born: Raymundus Joannes (Raymond Jean Marie) De Kremer; 8 July 1887; Ghent, Belgium
- Died: 17 September 1964 (aged 77); Ghent, Belgium
- Occupations: Writer, journalist
- Writing career
- Pen name: Jean Ray; John Flanders; King Ray; Alix R. Bantam; Sailor John
- Language: French; Dutch
- Period: 1910s–1964
- Genres: Fantastique, horror, detective fiction
- Notable works: Malpertuis (1943); La Cité de l'indicible peur (1943)

Raymundus Joannes de Kremer (8 July 1887 – 17 September 1964 was a prolific Belgian (Flemish) writer best known under the pen name Jean Ray.

Among English speakers, his most prominent work is the macabre novel Malpertuis (1943) under the Ray name, which was filmed by Harry Kümel in 1971 (starring Orson Welles). He also wrote journalism, stories for young readers in Dutch by the name John Flanders, and scenarios for comic strips and detective stories. He also used the pseudonyms John Flanders, King Ray, Captain Bill, Alix R. Bantam and Sailor John, among others.

== Biography ==
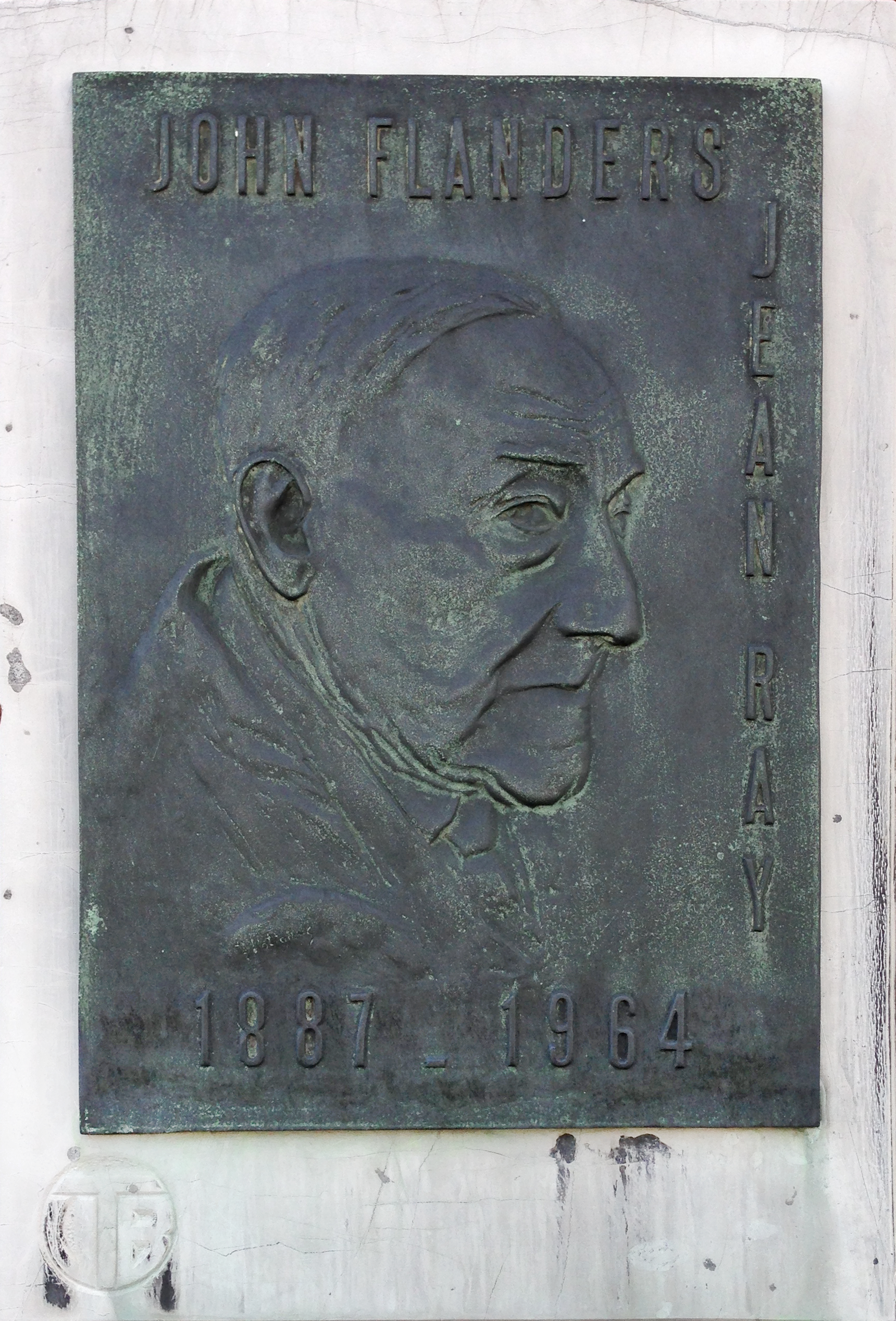
Memorial plaque in Ghent

Ray was born in Ghent, his father being a minor port official, his mother the director of a girls' school. Ray was a fairly successful student but failed to complete his university studies, and from 1910 to 1919 he worked in clerical jobs in the city administration.

By the early 1920s he had joined the editorial team of the Journal de Gand. Later he also joined the monthly L'Ami du Livre. His first book, Whiskey Tales, a collection of fantastic and uncanny stories, was published in 1925.

In 1926 he was charged with embezzlement and sentenced to six years in prison, but served only two years. During his imprisonment he wrote two of his best-known long stories, The Shadowy Street and The Mainz Psalter. From the time of his release in 1929 until the outbreak of the Second World War, he wrote virtually non-stop.

Between 1933 and 1940, Ray produced over a hundred tales in a series of detective stories, The Adventures of Harry Dickson, the American Sherlock Holmes, an investigator dedicated to the paranormal and the occult. He had been hired to translate a series from the German, but Ray found the stories so bad that he suggested to his Amsterdam publisher that he should re-write them instead. The publisher agreed, provided only that each story be about the same length as the original, and match the book's cover illustration. The Harry Dickson stories are admired by the film director Alain Resnais among others. During the winter of 1959–1960 Resnais met with Ray in the hope of making a film based on the Harry Dickson character.Despite the fact that Resnais carried out a series of location scouting trips in London and various other places in the United Kingdom, nothing came of the project.

During the Second World War Ray's prodigious output slowed, but he was able to publish his best known works in French, under the name Jean Ray: Le Grand Nocturne (1942), La Cité de l'Indicible Peur, also known as "La Grande Frousse", was adapted into a film by Jean-Pierre Mocky, starring Bourvil, Malpertuis, Les Cercles de L'Epouvante (all 1943), Les Derniers Contes de Canterbury (1944) and Le Livre des Fantômes (1947).

After the war he wrote comic-strip scenarios by the name of John Flanders. Among the comics he wrote scripts for are Buth's Thomas Pips and text stories by Antoon Herckenrath, Gray Croucher, Rik Clément. He was rescued from obscurity by Raymond Queneau and Roland Stragliati, whose influence got Malpertuis reprinted in French in 1956.

A few weeks before his death, he wrote his own mock epitaph in a letter to his friend Albert van Hageland: Ci gît Jean Ray/homme sinistre/qui ne fut rien/pas même ministre ("Here lies Jean Ray/A man sinister/who was nothing/not even a minister").

Jean Ray recounted some of his personal experiences with the supernatural in a short story from The Book of Ghosts called "My Ghost".

== Selected bibliography ==
=== in English ===
- Ghouls in my Grave (Berkley Publishing Corporation, 1965, F1071) translated from French by Lowell Bair
  - Gold Teeth
  - The Shadowy Street (alternate title: The Tenebrous Alley)
  - I Killed Alfred Heavenrock
  - The Cemetery Watchman (alternate titles: The Graveyard Duchess / The Guardian of the Cemetery)
  - The Mainz Psalter
  - The Last Traveler
  - The Black Mirror
  - Mr Glass Changes Direction
- Malpertuis (Atlas Press, 1998)
- My Own Private Spectres (Midnight House, 1999) limited edition of 350 copies
- The Horrifying Presence and Other Tales (Ex Occidente, 2009) translated from French by António Monteiro
- Whiskey Tales (Wakefield Press, 2019) translated from French by Scott Nicolay
- Cruise of Shadows: Haunted Stories of Land and Sea (Wakefield Press, 2019) translated from French by Scott Nicolay
- The Great Nocturnal: Tales of Dread (Wakefield Press, 2020) translated from French by Scott Nicolay
- Circles of Dread (Wakefield Press, 2020) translated from French by Scott Nicolay
- The City of Unspeakable Fear (Wakefield Press, 2023) translated from French by Scott Nicolay
- The Last Canterbury Tales (Wakefield Press, 2025) translated from French by Scott Nicolay

=== in French (Jean Ray) ===
- Les Contes du whisky [Whiskey Tales] (1925, rev. 1946)
- La Croisière des ombres [Cruise of Shadows] (1932)
- Le Grand Nocturne [The Great Darkness] (1942)
- Les Cercles de l'épouvante [The Circles of Terror] (1943)
- Malpertuis (1943; transl. Atlas Press, 1998)
- La Cité de l'indicible peur [The City of Unspeakable Fear] (1943)
- Les Derniers Contes de Canterbury [The Last Canterbury Tales] (1944)
- La Gerbe noire (editor) (1947)
- Le Livre des fantômes [The Book of Ghosts] (1947; rev. 1966)
- 25 Histoires noires et fantastiques [25 Dark and Fantastic Tales] (1961)
- Le Carrousel des maléfices [The Spellbound Merry-Go-Round] (1964)
- Les Contes noirs du golf [Dark Tales of Golf] (1964)
- Saint Judas-de-la-Nuit [St. Judas-of-the-Night] (1964)
- Bestiaire fantastique [Fantastic Bestiary] (posthumous, 1974)

=== in Dutch (John Flanders) ===
- Spoken op de ruwe heide [Ghosts on the heath] (1935)
- Het monster van Borough [The monster of Borough] (1948)
- Geheimen van het Noorden [Secrets of the North] (1948)
- Het zwarte eiland [The black island] (1948)

=== in German (Jean Ray) ===
- Die Gasse der Finsternis (Suhrkamp Taschenbuch, 1984)
  - Die Gasse der Finsternis [La ruelle ténébreuse / The Tenebrous Alley] (1932)
  - Null Uhr Zwanzig [Minuit vingt / Twenty Minutes past Midnight] (1925)
  - Die weiße Bestie [La bete blanche] (1925)
  - Der Friedhofswächter [Le gardien du cimetière / The Cemetery Watchman] (1925)
  - M. Wohlmut und Franz Benscheider [M. Wohlmut et Franz Benscheider] (1947)
  - Die Nacht von Pentonville [La nuit de Pentonville] (1947)
  - Nächtlicher Reigen in Königstein [Ronde de nuit à Koenigstein] (1947)
  - Der Uhu [Le uhu / The Uhu] (1944)
  - Mainzer Psalter [Le psautier de Mayence / The Mainz Psalter] (1932)
  - Vetter Passeroux [Le cousin Passeroux] (1947)
  - Der eiserne Tempel [Le temple de fer] (1967)
  - Straßen [Rues / Streets] (1947)

== See also ==
- Harry Dickson
- Fantastique
