= Villa Giulia Painter =

Ancient Greek vase painter

The Villa Giulia Painter was an ancient Greek vase painter, active in Athens, Greece, from about 470 to 440 B.C. His real name is unknown, but like many other ancient Greek vase painters, his style was recognized in several works by the British classical archaeologist and international authority of Attic Greek vases, Sir John Beazley (1885–1970) in his book Attic Red-Figured Vases in American Museums.

The artist was named after a distinct vase in the Villa Giulia Museum in Rome, Italy.

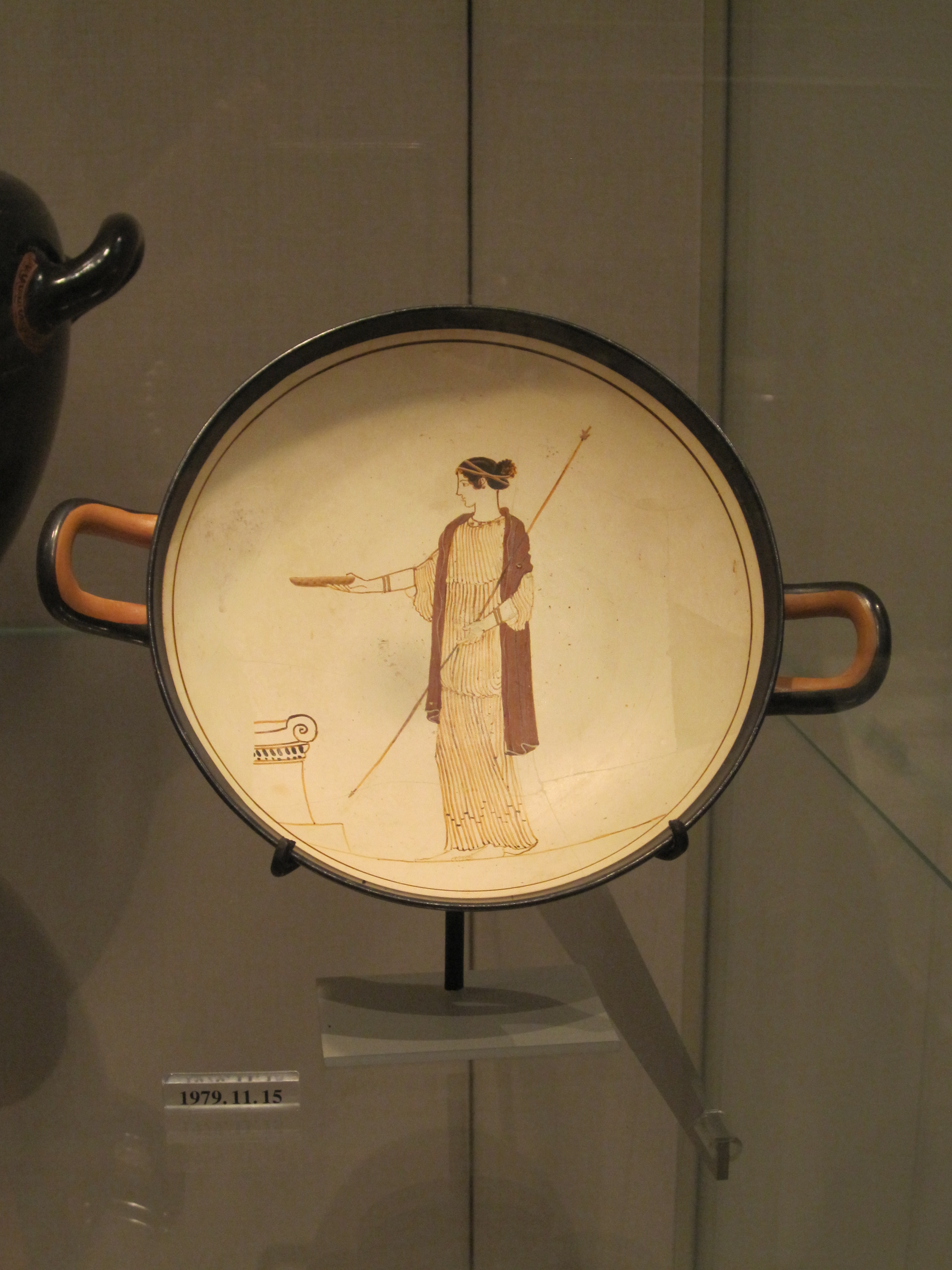
A terra-cotta kylix, or drinking cup

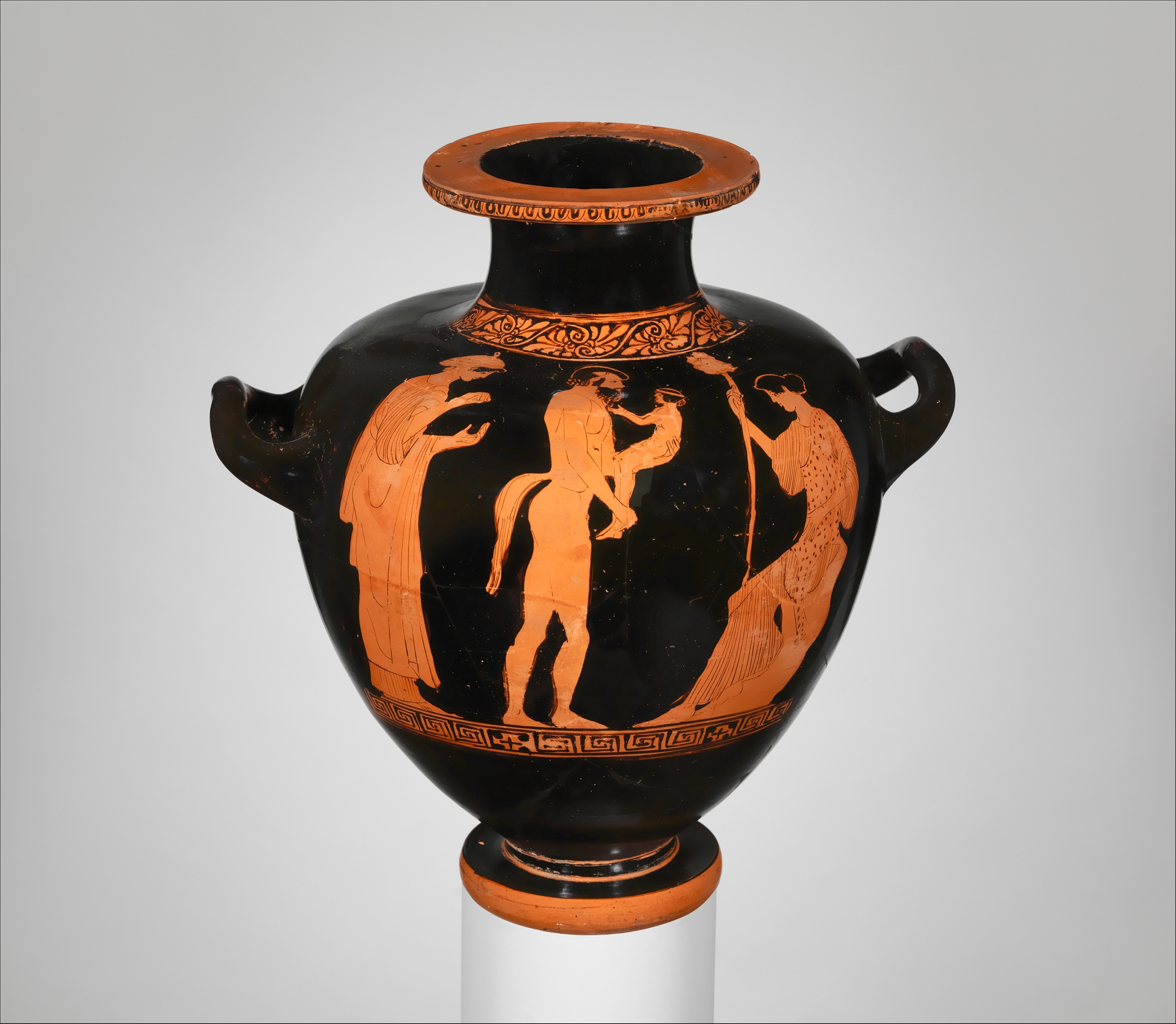
A terra-cotta hydria: kalpis (water jar)

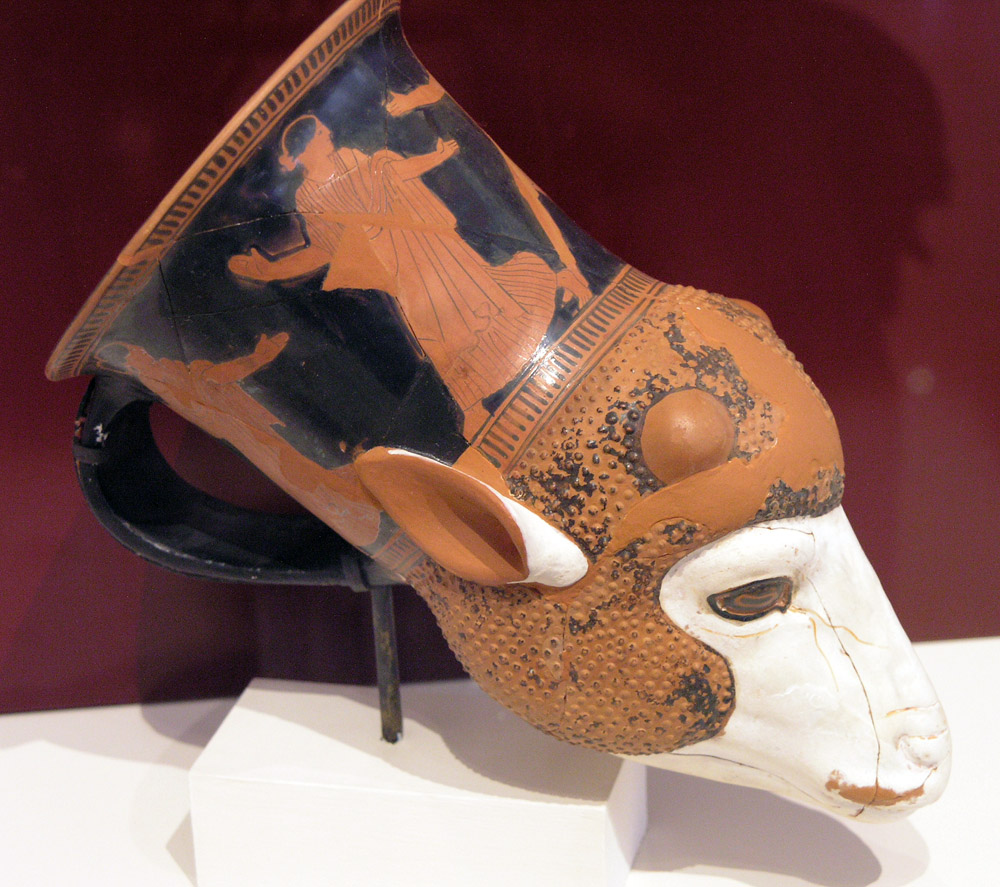
Red-figure ram rhyton
