= Malpertuis =

1943 gothic horror novel

First edition (publ. Les Auteurs Associés) Cover artist:J. Lempereur

Malpertuis (1943) is a gothic horror novel by the Belgian author Jean Ray (1887–1964).

== Premise ==
Malpertuis is a crumbling, ancient house where a dying warlock has trapped the aging Olympian gods inside the "skins" of ordinary Flemish citizens.

== Structure ==
The novel is divided into four narratives:

1. The modern-day narrator (who remains unnamed) explains in a prologue that he stole the manuscripts that comprise the rest of the novel from the Convent of the White Penitents. In the epilogue, he locates Malpertuis, sees Eisengott and Old Mother Groulle in a tavern, enters the house, has a brief encounter with Euryale then flees.
2. The diary of Jean-Jacques Grandsire (also broken into two parts) that ends when he and Bets leave Malpertuis.
3. Doucedame the Elder's story of the capture of the Olympians; it has presumably been assembled by Doucedame the Younger.
4. Father Euchere (aka Dom Misseron) of the Convent of the White Penitents, and reveals the final fates of both Jean-Jacques Grandsire and Doucedame the Younger.

== Film adaptation ==
In 1971 the Belgian director Harry Kümel made a film adaptation of the novel, starring Orson Welles, Susan Hampshire and Mathieu Carrière.

== In popular culture ==
Malpertuis is quoted in Ross J. Anderson's paper "Do you believe in Tinker Bell? The social externalities of trust", quoting (translated): "Men are not born of the whim or will of the gods, on the contrary, gods owe their existence to the belief of men. Should this belief wither, the gods will die."

A copy of the novel is prominently displayed on the coffee table of Haydée (Haydée Politoff) in Eric Rohmer's 1967 film La Collectionneuse.
