= Scott Nicolay =

American author of weird fiction (born 1963)

- Born: April 16, 1963 (age 63); United States
- Education: Rutgers University
- Occupations: Author, translator, poet
- Writing career
- Language: English
- Genres: Weird fiction, Horror fiction
- Notable works: Ana Kai Tangata "Do You Like to Look at Monsters?"
- Notable awards: 2015 World Fantasy Award for Best Short Story
- Website: scottnicolay.com

Scott Nicolay (born April 16, 1963) is an American author of weird fiction. Nicolay's "Do You Like to Look At Monsters?" received the World Fantasy Award for Best Short Story in 2015. He resides on the Navajo Nation in New Mexico. Nicolay hosts The Outer Dark, a weekly podcast about weird fiction.

== Biography ==
Nicolay was born in New Jersey and studied at Rutgers University.

At the age of 26, he moved to the Navajo Nation in New Mexico, where he later taught school. Nicolay is a poetry enthusiast and has translated poetry and fiction from French. He has been active in youth poetry slam movements.

Nicolay spent time as an active caver and archaeologist. He used the name Ana Kai Tangata, a cave he had studied on Easter Island, for the title of his first book of collected short fiction. The cave's name is associated with cannibalism in the Rapa Nui language.

== Selected bibliography ==
- Ana Kai Tangata (2014), collected short fiction.
- "Do You Like to Look at Monsters?" (2015), short story, recipient of the World Fantasy Award for Best Short Story.
- After (2015), novella.

Preceded by Caitlín R. Kiernan	World Fantasy Award—Short Fiction winner 2015	Succeeded by Alyssa Wong
