= Absurd (film) =

Absurd (Rosso Sangue)
- Theatrical release poster
- Directed by: Joe D'Amato
- Screenplay by: George Eastman
- Story by: George Eastman
- Produced by: Joe D'Amato; Donatella Donati
- Starring: George Eastman; Annie Belle; Charles Borromel; Katya Berger; Ian Danby; Kasimir Berger; Hanja Kochansky; Edmund Purdom; Ted Rusoff
- Cinematography: Joe D'Amato
- Edited by: Alberto Moriani
- Music by: Carlo Maria Cordio
- Production companies: P.C.M. International; Metaxa Corporation
- Distributed by: Cinema 80
- Release date: October 1981 (Italy)
- Running time: 96 minutes
- Country: Italy
- Language: English

Absurd (Italian: Rosso Sangue, literal translation: Blood Red; also known as Anthropophagus 2, Zombie 6: Monster Hunter, Horrible, and The Grim Reaper 2) is a 1981 English-language Italian slasher film directed, lensed, and co-produced by Joe D'Amato and starring George Eastman, who also wrote the story and screenplay.

== Plot ==
Mikos Stenopolis is a man who was experimented on in a church-sanctioned scientific experiment that gave him healing powers but inadvertently drove him insane. The Vatican priest who helped create him pursues the homicidal Mikos to a small American town, attempting to kill him by impaling him on a set of railings that disembowel him. Still, he later revives at a local hospital. After brutally murdering a nurse, the madman escapes and goes on a killing spree. The priest informs the hospital and authorities that the only way to kill Mikos is to "destroy the cerebral mass."

While attacking a motorcyclist after escaping from the hospital, Mikos is struck by a hit-and-run driver. The car's driver, Mr. Bennett, and his wife are going to a friend's house for a Super Bowl viewing party, leaving their two children at home with a babysitter. Their daughter, Katya, is confined to her bed because of a problem with her spine, while her younger brother believes that the "Bogeyman" is coming to get him.

Mikos makes his way to the Bennetts' home and, upon recognizing Mr. Bennett's car, begins to murder everyone there. Peggy, the babysitter, is stabbed in the head with a pickaxe, and Emily, a nurse who has been caring for Katya, has her head forced into a lit oven and is stabbed in the throat with a pair of scissors, but not before sending the brother off to get help. Katya struggles to get out of bed to take on the killer herself. Mikos breaks into Katya's bedroom and attacks her, but she manages to stab him in the eyes with a set of drawing compasses. She then stumbles down the hallway as the blinded killer staggers after her. He stalks her through the house, but Katya manages to elude him. The priest arrives and struggles with Mikos, and Katya grabs an axe from a decorative suit of armor and decapitates Mikos with it. The police and the rest of the family arrive to discover Katya standing in the doorway, covered in blood, holding Mikos's severed head.

== Cast ==
- George Eastman as Mikos Stenopolis
- Annie Belle as Emily
- Charles Borromel as Sergeant Ben Engleman
- Edmund Purdom as Priest
- Katya Berger as Katya Bennett
- Kasimir Berger as Willy Bennett
- Hanja Kochansky as Carol Bennett, the mother
- Ian Danby as Ian Bennett, the father
- Ted Rusoff as Doctor Kramer
- Cindy Leadbetter as Peggy (uncredited)
- Lucia Ramirez as Woman Named Angela on TV (uncredited)
- Mark Shannon as Man on TV (uncredited)
- Michele Soavi as Biker (uncredited)
- Goffredo Unger as Machine Shop Worker (uncredited)
- Martin Sorrentino as Deputy (uncredited)
- James Sampson as Cop at the Station (uncredited)

== Production ==
George Eastman, the film's protagonist and writer, recalls that director and producer Joe D'Amato wanted it to be a proper sequel to Antropophagus (1980), whereas Eastman himself opposed it. D'Amato then asked him only to act in it, but when Eastman read the treatment someone had written, he found it so bad that he decided to write one himself for D'Amato. Eastman then remembers rewriting it "from scratch, like one of those American thrillers, Halloween style".

The shooting took place in May 1981 in a relatively short period of time. Eastman remembers that the whole film was shot at nighttime. The two child actors, Katia and Kasimir Berger, were the children of William Berger.

Michele Soavi, who played a biker in the film, went on to become a successful Italian horror film director in his own right. D'Amato later produced Soavi's first directorial effort, Stage Fright, which he said was "...out of all the films I produced, my favorite, and Soavi is the most talented out of all the young directors I've launched....I think very highly of him."

Absurd was the first film D'Amato directed, spoken in English, as it was conceived almost exclusively for the foreign market.

At one point during the shoot, according to D'Amato's personal documents, the film's working title was La porta dell'oltretomba (literally: "The Door of the Beyond").

The house in which most of the film is set was located in Fiano Romano, near Rome. Donatella Donati remembered that it belonged to some girls who used to rent it out as a film set. A few months later, in the summer of 1981, the same set was used in the three adult films Baby sitter, Pat una donna particolare and ...e il terzo gode directed by Alberto Cavallone under the pseudonym "Baron Corvo".

D'Amato produced the film with his "P.C.M. International" (the acronym standing for "Produzioni Cinematografiche Massaccesi"), which he had already used to produce Sesso nero and Antropophagus, while Edward Sarlui provided additional funding with his Panamanian company Metaxa Corporation and acted as shield - so much so that the film never became Italian and ended up being officially Panamanian. However, D'Amato later twisted it back his way and distributed it with his company "Cinema 80".

== Relation to Anthropophagus ==
Absurd is in many ways only a spiritual sequel to Anthropophagus. Connections between the two films are the following: George Eastman's and Joe D'Amato's involvement; the presence of a murderer, played by George Eastman in effectively the same role as the one he played in the first film, the disemboweled man, and the association with a Greek island in both films. Author Jim Harper felt "the film drew many of its ideas from Halloween (1978) rather than from Anthropophagous and that "it generally worked against the film."

Joe D'Amato attempted to make the film more attractive to the American market by setting it in the United States, even though it was shot in Italy.

== Release ==
=== Italy ===
Absurd passed censorship on October 21, 1981.

Theatrically, Absurd was released as Rosso Sangue in October 1981 in Italy. It was distributed by D'Amato's company Cinema 80, which he mostly used to produce hardcore pornographic films.

On VHS, the film was released by Avo and Cinemanetwork.

=== UK ===
Absurd was originally released in both a cut and an uncut version, with identical sleeve designs, by Medusa Home Video in 1981. The original tape is highly sought after and a prized collectible among fans. In its uncut state, Absurd was placed on the DPP's list of video nasties in 1983, but that same year a version was released theatrically with two minutes and 23 seconds of cuts. Still, Absurd was one of the UK's video nasties and became one of 39 titles successfully prosecuted under the Obscene Publications Acts in 1984.

In 2016, the UK company 88 Films Ltd conducted a crowdfunding campaign for a new mastering of the film in 2k. The goal was reached quickly and surpassed, and the additional budget was used to add four other films. The BBFC rated Absurd with the BBFC '18' classification with no cuts necessary. That was the film's first time in the UK. Previously, it was censored with that rating. The new Blu-ray, released by 88 Films, had its street date on February 13, 2017.

=== Other countries ===
In the United States, Absurd was released on VHS by Wizard Video under the title Monster Hunter. The film was also considered, at the time of its home video release, as a "sequel" to the Zombi series, under the title Zombie 6: Monster Hunter. An incorrect description on the back of the box promoted the film as a sequel to those zombie films. On September 25, 2018, the film was released on Blu-ray by Severin Films, limited to 3000 copies.

In Germany, the film was released on DVD by Astro.

An uncut DVD version of the film was released under the French title, Horrible, via Mya Communication on July 28, 2009. Also, an uncut DVD version including a long version of the film was released under the German title Absurd via XT-Video on December 15, 2010.

== Reception ==
On its release, some critics accused the film of being nothing more than an Italian version of Halloween. There are some similarities between the two films – references to a 'Bogeyman' and a babysitter and her charges in peril from a silent and seemingly indestructible killer.

To add to its fame, the film inspired the name for German black metal act Absurd, whose members later switched their interest from gore films to far-right extremism and committed murder in 1993.

In 2001, Peter Dendle called the film a "boring formula-slasher."

In his book on slasher movies published in 2004, Jim Harper opined that it was "a marginally better film than Anthropophagous" mainly because of its slightly improved pacing, with "gruelling special effects every twelve minutes or so" - which Harper, however, also criticizes as "dull and repetitive". According to Harper, D'Amato's camerawork is "as inept as ever", and "any humour [...] entirely unintentional".

In 2012, Peter Normanton wrote: "While hopelessly limited by the constraints of an inadequate budget, [D'Amato] was still able to deliver the American-styled slasher, with script-writer George Eastman [...] engaging just enough narrative to allow the psychopath to stray between a series of set pieces as he killed off a predominantly youthful supporting cast."

Critic Jim Harper opined, "(Absurd) boasts a more interesting plot (than Anthropophagous) and thankfully does not contain over an hour of dull holiday footage. This time the murders are spaced more evenly throughout the film, making it less of a chore to sit through".
