= Debra Berger =

American actress

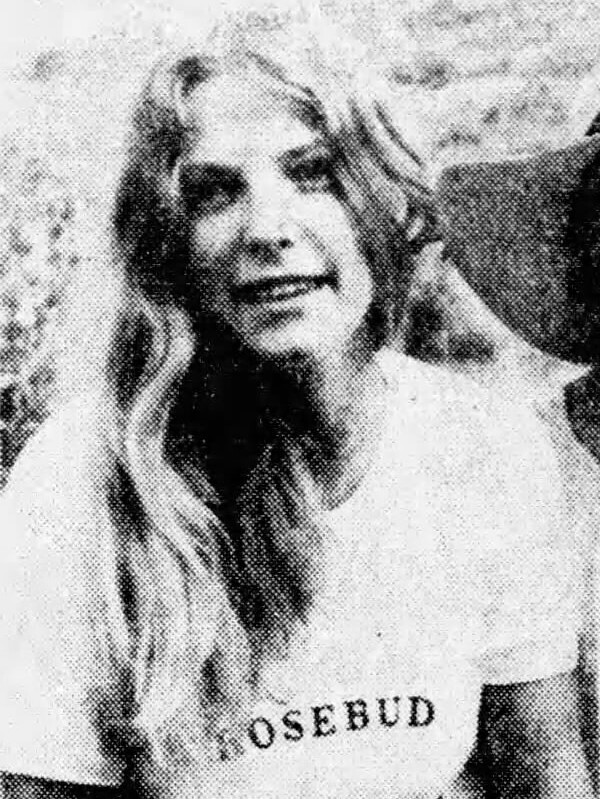
- Berger in 1974
- Occupations: Film, television actress, artist, designer
- Partner: Alessandro Ruspoli, 9th Prince of Cerveteri
- Children: 2, including Tao Ruspoli
- Father: William Berger
- Relatives: Katya Berger (step-sister)
- Website: debraberger.net casasvejerdebra.com

Debra Berger is an American actress, artist, and designer.

== Life ==
She was the daughter of actor William Berger from his first marriage in 1957. She was the step-sister of actress Katya Berger and half-sister of child actor Kasimir Berger. She is also the stepdaughter of Croatian singer and actress Hanja Kochansky. She was the star of Marcel Carné's La merveilleuse visite.

== Personal life ==
Berger was linked romantically to Alessandro, Principe Ruspoli (December 9, 1924 – January 11, 2005), 9th Principe di Cerveteri, 9th Marchese di Riano, and 14th Conte di Vignanello. They had two sons:

- Tao Ruspoli (born in Bangkok on November 7, 1975). He married actress Olivia Wilde on June 7, 2003 in Washington. They divorced in 2011.
- Bartolomeo Ruspoli (born in Rome on October 6, 1978). He married Aileen Getty, daughter of John Paul Getty Jr. and his first wife Gail Harris, in November 2004. They have no children. He appeared as himself in his brother's documentary Just Say Know (2002).

== Filmography ==
- Hawaii Five-O (1 episode, The Diamond That Nobody Stole, 1973): Michi Djebara (as Deborah Berger)
- La merveilleuse visite (1974): Déliah (as Deborah Berger)
- Terminal (1974)
- Rosebud (1975): Gertrude
- Parapsycho – Spectrum of Fear (1975): Debbie
- Born for Hell (1976): Bridget (as Debby Berger)
- Emanuelle in Bangkok (1976): Debra
- Una devastante voglia di vincere (1977, TV mini-series)
- The Inglorious Bastards (1978): Nicole
- Nana (1983): Satin
- Dangerously Close (1986): Ms Hoffman
- Invaders from Mars (1986): Corporal Walker
- Lightning, the White Stallion (1986): Lili Castle
- 52 Pick-Up (1986): O'Boyle's Wife
- Just Say Know (2002): Herself

== See also ==
- Ruspoli
