= Peer Augustinski =

German actor (1940–2014)

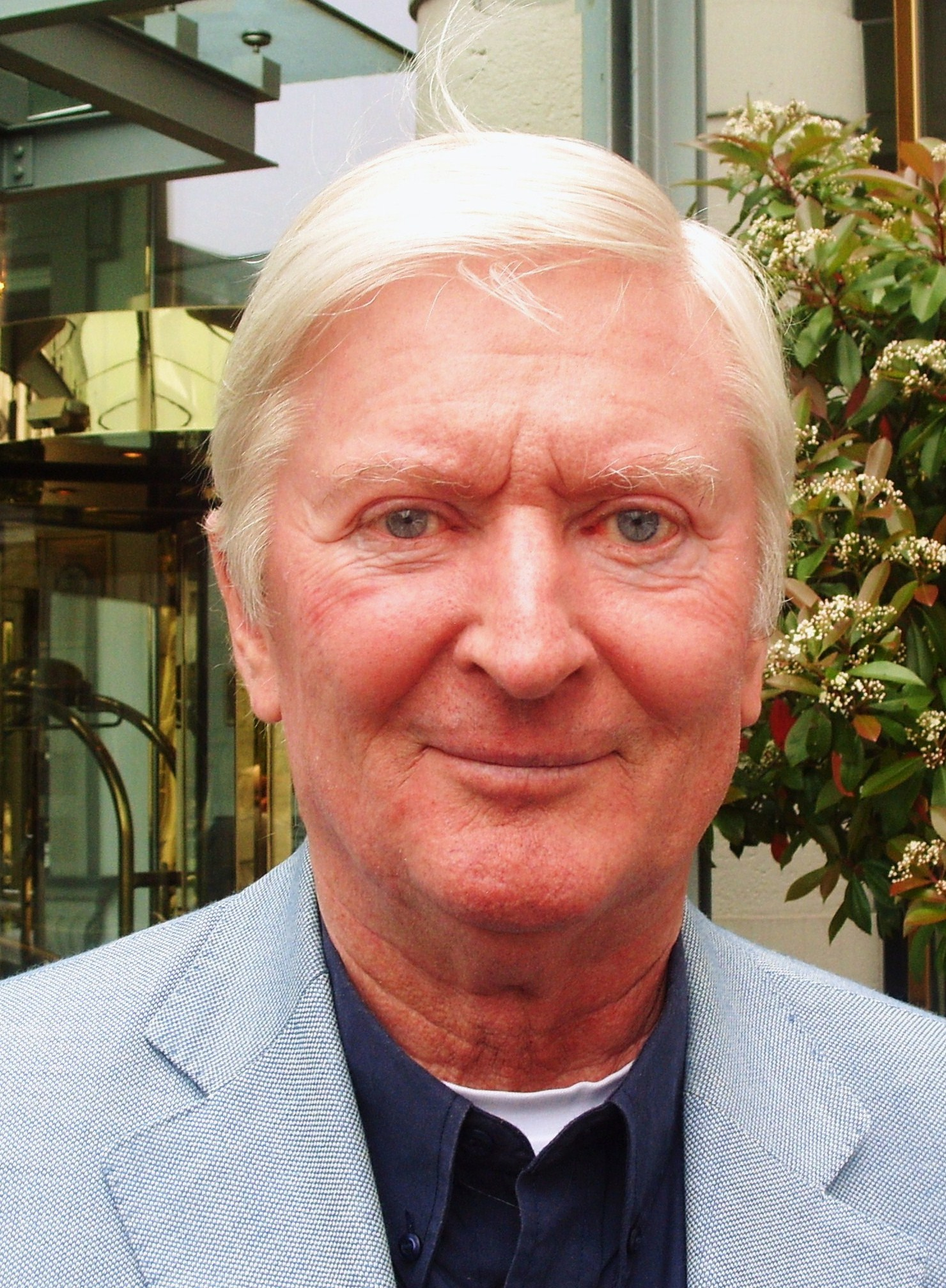
- Augustinski in 2009
- Born: 25 June 1940; Berlin, Germany
- Died: 3 October 2014 (aged 74); Cologne, Germany
- Occupation: Actor
- Years active: 1964–2009

Peer Augustinski (25 June 1940 – 3 October 2014) was a German actor who specialized in television and dubbing. He's also the father of Bernd Augustinski, a German music producer.

== Biography ==
Born in Berlin, Augustinski was best known as a cast member of Klimbim ("Odds and Ends"), one of the first successful comedy shows in German television, and as the official German dubbing artist of Robin Williams. With the exception of The Peddler in Aladdin, Augustinski dubbed all of Williams' film and television roles from late 1986 (starting with Seize the Day) to 2004.

He had a debilitating stroke in 2005 which prevented him from working as actively as before, but he was eventually able to dub Williams in a few more projects, the last being Night at the Museum: Battle of the Smithsonian in 2009.

=== Death ===
Augustinski died less than two months after Williams, on 3 October 2014, aged 74, after complications from epilepsy.

== Live-action works ==
- Klimbim (1976–1979, TV series, seasons 3–5)
- Zwei himmlische Töchter (1978, TV series)
- Unsere schönsten Jahre (1983)
- Matt in 13 Zügen (1984, TV miniseries), as Peter Cranach
- Derrick – season 11, episode 14: Stellen Sie sich vor, man hat Dr. Prestel erschossen (1984, TV), as Dr. Prestel
- Drei gegen Drei (1985), as Brunnenmeier

== Voice acting roles ==
- The Adventures of Baron Munchausen (King of the Moon)
- Aladdin (The Genie)
- Anastasia (Bartok)
- Asterix Conquers America (Asterix) (German Dub)
- Awakenings (Doctor Malcolm Sayer)
- Dead Again (Cozy Carlisle)
- Dead Poets Society (John Keating)
- Dumb and Dumber (Harry Dunne)
- The Fisher King (Parry)
- Flubber (Doctor Philip Brainard)
- Good Morning, Vietnam (Adrian Cronauer)
- Good Will Hunting (Sean Maguire)
- Die große Käseverschwörung
- Hook (Peter Banning/Peter Pan)
- Mrs. Doubtfire (Daniel Hillard/Misses Euphegenia Doubtfire)
- Raining Cats and Frogs (Fuchs)
- The Santa Clause (Scott Calvin/Santa Claus)
- Toy Story (Sheriff Woody)
- Toy Story 2 (Sheriff Woody)
- Toys (Leslie Zevo)
