= The Adventures of Hercules =

1985 film

- Directed by: Luigi Cozzi
- Written by: Luigi Cozzi
- Produced by: Alfred Pecoriello; Yoram Globus; Menahem Golan
- Starring: Lou Ferrigno
- Cinematography: Alberto Spagnoli
- Edited by: Sergio Montanari
- Music by: Pino Donaggio
- Production company: Cannon Italia
- Distributed by: The Cannon Group
- Release date: 2 May 1985 (Italy)
- Running time: 88 minutes
- Countries: Italy; United States
- Languages: English, Italian

The Adventures of Hercules (Italian: Le avventure dell'incredibile Ercole) also known as Hercules II: The Adventures of Hercules is the 1985 sequel to the 1983 film Hercules. It was written and directed by Luigi Cozzi and has bodybuilder-turned-actor Lou Ferrigno reprising his role as the title character Hercules.

== Summary ==
The film opens explaining the story of Zeus' Seven Mighty Thunderbolts that kept peace. One day, other vengeful gods (Aphrodite, Hera, Poseidon, and Flora) stole these lightning bolts to create chaos. The lack of these thunderbolts has rendered Zeus powerless and sent the Moon on a collision course with the Earth. As the humans on Earth begin to suffer, two sisters named Urania and Glaucia speak to the Little People and learn that only Hercules can save them now. After hesitation, Zeus finally decides to send Hercules back from the stars to Earth to aid the humans, but the vengeful gods resurrect their own warrior, King Minos. They believe that King Minos, with the help of Dedalos, can defeat Zeus with science. Thus begins Hercules' quest to find the Seven Mighty Thunderbolts, which are hidden inside monsters across the Universe.

First, Hercules fights and defeats an apelike creature, and then retrieves the first thunderbolt. Meanwhile, as the four gods resurrect King Minos, Hercules teams up with Glaucia to rescue her sister Urania from hideous monsters, called the Slime People. Overwhelmed by the monsters' huge numbers, they flee into a cave full of stone statues, where they meet Euryale. Hercules and the sisters battle some more monsters, while Euryale walks away and reveals herself to be a snake-haired, half-woman, half-scorpion Gorgon. Using his shield as a mirror, Hercules manages to kill Euryale without being turned into stone, and then retrieves the second thunderbolt.

Hercules and the two sisters sail to an island and enter an old, haunted forest with strange human dolls hanging from the trees. He is then attacked by a demonic sorcerer-knight, but Hercules overwhelms the knight and impales him onto a poisonous thorn branch, revealing the third thunderbolt. Glaucia is captured by a high priest's soldiers to be sacrificed to the deadly fire monster Antaeus. Urania then rescues her while Hercules battles Antaeus, summoned by the priest, and defeats him by throwing him around the Earth until he crashes into the sea, also revealing the fourth thunderbolt.

Hercules and Glaucia then battle some Amazon warriors but he is captured by them. Urania wakes Hercules and he strangles the Amazons' leader Arachne, the Queen of the Spiders, whose body contains the fifth thunderbolt. The three travel up in space where Urania reveals the location of the sixth thunderbolt inside a rock. Glaucia tries to kill Urania. Minos appears and reveals that when both Hercules and Urania had lost Glaucia, he commanded Poseidon to use the waters to drain her life. Hercules battles Minos, who transforms into a dinosaur, while Hercules transforms into a gorilla and destroys Minos once and for all.

Urania then reveals that, according to information she received earlier from the Little People, she is the daughter of Hera, and her body contains the seventh thunderbolt. She decides to sacrifice her life so that Zeus can retrieve the thunderbolt, and does so by allowing Hera to give her the "kiss of death". With Zeus' help, Hercules grows as big as the galaxy and stops the Earth and the Moon from colliding into each other, putting the Moon back in its proper place. Both Hercules and Urania are honored by Zeus, become gods and are able to live with them.

== Cast ==
Character	Original actor	English voice
Hercules	Lou Ferrigno	Marc Smith
Urania	Milly Carlucci	Unknown
Glaucia	Sonia Viviani	Geneviève Hersent
King Minos	William Berger	Anthony La Penna
Athena	Carlotta Green	Unknown
Zeus	Claudio Cassinelli	Unknown
Poseidon	Nando Poggi	Unknown
Hera	Maria Rosaria Omaggio	Susan Spafford
High Priest	Venantino Venantini	Marne Maitland
Flora	Laura Lenzi	Unknown
Aphrodite	Margie Newton	Unknown
Ilia	Cindy Leadbetter	Unknown
Atreus	Raf Baldassarre	Unknown
Euryale	Serena Grandi	Unknown
Dedalos	Eva Robbins	Unknown

== Production ==
The Adventures of Hercules was shot in Rome at Incir de Paolis Studios. It went into production in 1984.

== Release ==
The Adventures of Hercules was released in Italy on May 2, 1985 and later in the United States on October 4. Alternative English-language titles for the film include The Adventures of Hercules II and The New Adventures of Hercules.

== Reception ==
Howard Hughes discussed the film in his book Cinema Italiano, noting that it shares stock footage from the original film but is not as entertaining. The review noted the visuals and film score would "induce migraines". Andy Brack of Charleston City Paper named The Adventures of Hercules his "favorite Ferrigno film".

== See also ==
- List of films featuring Hercules
