= Electric Boogaloo: The Wild, Untold Story of Cannon Films =

2014 film by Mark Hartley

- Australian theatrical poster
- Directed by: Mark Hartley
- Written by: Mark Hartley
- Produced by: Brett Ratner; James Packer; Veronica Fury
- Starring: See below
- Cinematography: Garry Richards
- Edited by: Jamie Blanks; Sara Edwards; Mark Hartley
- Music by: Jamie Blanks
- Production companies: RatPac Documentary Films; Wildbear Entertainment; Melbourne International Film Festival Premiere Fund; Screen Queensland; Film Victoria; Screen Australia; Celluloid Nightmares
- Distributed by: Umbrella Entertainment (Australia); Warner Bros. Pictures (United States)
- Release date: 2 August 2014 (Melbourne International Film Festival)
- Running time: 106 minutes
- Countries: Australia; United States
- Language: English

Electric Boogaloo: The Wild, Untold Story of Cannon Films is a 2014 Australian-American documentary film written and directed by Mark Hartley. It tells the story of cousins Menahem Golan and Yoram Globus who headed The Cannon Group. Those interviewed lay tribute to the brash, unconventional immigrant filmmakers who gave young actors a chance and give unflinching anecdotes of both the hits and the low budget and often crass films created.

== Interviewees ==
- Olivia d'Abo
- John G. Avildsen
- Martine Beswick
- Richard Chamberlain
- Sybil Danning
- Boaz Davidson
- Bo Derek
- Lucinda Dickey
- Michael Dudikoff
- Robert Forster
- Diane Franklin
- Elliott Gould
- Tobe Hooper
- Just Jaeckin
- Laurene Landon
- Avi Lerner
- Dolph Lundgren
- Franco Nero
- Cassandra Peterson
- Molly Ringwald
- Robin Sherwood
- Marina Sirtis
- Catherine Mary Stewart
- Alex Winter
- Franco Zeffirelli

== List of films prominently featured ==
- Allan Quatermain and the Lost City of Gold
- America 3000
- American Ninja
- The Apple
- Avenging Force
- Barfly
- Beat Street
- Body and Soul
- Bolero
- Breakin'
- Breakin' 2: Electric Boogaloo
- That Championship Season
- A Cry in the Dark
- Cyborg
- Death Wish II
- Death Wish 3
- Death Wish 4: The Crackdown
- The Delta Force
- Enter the Ninja
- Revenge of the Ninja
- Ninja III: The Domination
- Exterminator 2
- Fool for Love
- The Forbidden Dance
- Going Bananas
- The Happy Hooker Goes Hollywood
- Hercules
- Hospital Massacre (aka X-Ray)
- House of the Long Shadows
- Inga
- Invaders from Mars
- Invasion U.S.A.
- Joe
- Journey to the Center of the Earth
- King Lear
- King Solomon's Mines
- Kinjite: Forbidden Subjects
- Lady Chatterley's Lover
- Lambada
- The Last American Virgin
- Lemon Popsicle
- Lifeforce
- Love Streams
- Masters of the Universe
- Mata Hari
- Messenger of Death
- Missing in Action
- Missing in Action 2: The Beginning
- New Year's Evil
- Operation Thunderbolt
- Otello
- Over the Brooklyn Bridge
- Over the Top
- Runaway Train
- Sahara
- Salsa
- Schizoid
- Superman IV: The Quest for Peace
- 10 to Midnight
- The Texas Chainsaw Massacre 2
- Treasure of San Lucas
- The Wicked Lady

== Production ==
The film was partly funded by Brett Ratner's RatPac-Dune Entertainment. Other investors included the Melbourne International Film Festival’s Premiere Fund, Film Victoria, and Screen Queensland.

== Release ==
Electric Boogaloo had its world premiere in August 2014 at the Melbourne International Film Festival, and was shown in October 2014 at the BFI London Film Festival.

=== Critical reception ===
The film received critical acclaim. The review aggregation website Rotten Tomatoes gives the film a 92% approval rating, based on reviews from 49 critics, with an average rating of 7.4/10. The site's consensus states: "Electric Boogaloo: The Wild, Untold Story of Cannon Films pays tribute to the titular studio with an affectionate look back that's arguably more entertaining than much of Cannon's own B-movie product."

=== Home media ===
The film was released on Blu-ray by Ascot Elite Home Entertainment in 2015.

== See also ==
- Not Quite Hollywood: The Wild, Untold Story of Ozploitation!, a 2008 documentary film also by Hartley
- The Go-Go Boys: The Inside Story of Cannon Films, a 2014 documentary film also about Cannon Films
- American Grindhouse, a 2010 documentary film similar in content
