= Leon Askin =

Austrian actor (1907–2005)

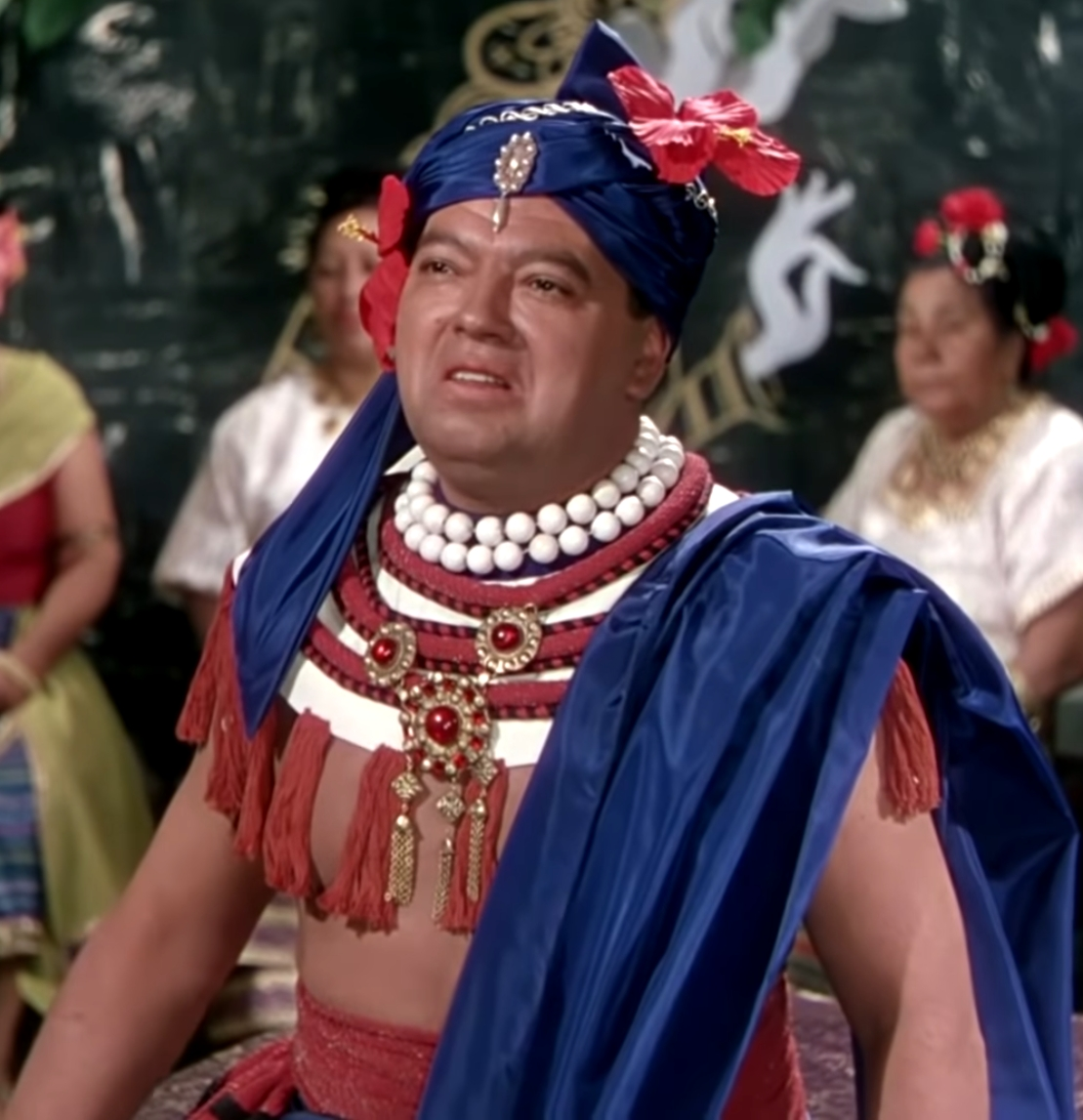
- Askin in Road to Bali (1952)
- Born: Leo Aschkenasy; 18 September 1907; Vienna, Austria-Hungary
- Died: 3 June 2005 (aged 97); Vienna, Austria
- Resting place: Vienna Central Cemetery
- Occupation: Actor
- Years active: 1930s–2001
- Spouses: Louise "Mimi" Huntington-Smith (m. 1945; div. 1955) Annelies Ehrlich (m. 1955; div. 1994) Anita Wicher (m. 2002)

Leon Askin (German pronunciation: [ˈleːɔn ˈaskin]; born Leo Aschkenasy, 18 September 1907 – 3 June 2005) was an Austrian-born actor best known in North America for portraying the character General Albert Burkhalter on the TV situation comedy Hogan's Heroes. From the 1950s onward he had a steady career on both sides of the Atlantic.

== Life and career ==
Leon Askin was born as Leo Aschkenasy into a Jewish family in Vienna, Austria-Hungary, on September 18, 1907. His parents, Malvine (née Susman) and Samuel Aschkenasy, were murdered in the Treblinka extermination camp during the Holocaust, in 1942.

Askin’s first experience with performance came during World War I, when, as a child, he recited a poem before Emperor Franz Joseph. In the 1920s, he studied acting under Louise Dumont and Max Reinhardt. In the 1930s, he directed politically charged works by playwright Jura Soyfer at Vienna’s "ABC" cabaret theater. His professional debut as an actor came in Vienna in 1926 in The Dutch Merchant.

Fleeing Austria in 1940 following persecution and physical abuse by the Sturmabteilung (SA) and Schutzstaffel (SS), Askin emigrated first to France, where he was interned at the Camp des Rochères et de la Poterie in Meslay de Maine, and then to the United States. During World War II, he served as a staff sergeant in the United States Army Air Forces. After the war, he began a career in Hollywood, often cast as foreign characters with thick accents.

Askin appeared as Anton Rubinstein in a Disneyland television episode about Pyotr Ilyich Tchaikovsky. He was featured in the series Adventures of Superman—first as a diamond smuggler in the 1953 episode "Superman in Exile", and later as a South American leader in a color episode. His film work included the role of Abidor, a Syrian guide, in The Robe (1953).

Askin continued working steadily in film and television through the 1950s and 1960s. Notable appearances include Pension Schöller (1960), and a key supporting role in Billy Wilder’s political satire One, Two, Three (1961), co-starring with James Cagney.

His most iconic role came in the sitcom Hogan's Heroes (1965–1971), in which he portrayed the stern and blustering General Albert Burkhalter, appearing in 67 episodes. The character constantly aggravated the inept Colonel Klink and was a frequent target of manipulation by the POWs.

Askin made guest appearances on numerous television shows including:

The Restless Gun (1957, episode: "The Shooting of Jett King")

My Favorite Martian (1965, episode: "Martin of the Movies")

The Monkees (1967, episode: "The Card Carrying Red Shoes")

Daniel Boone (1969, episode: "Benvenuto... Who?")

Paul Sand in Friends and Lovers (1974, episode: "Fiddler in the House")

Happy Days (1978, episode: "Fearless Malph")

Three’s Company (1979, episode: "The Bake-Off")

Between 1977 and 1979, Askin appeared on PBS’s Meeting of Minds, portraying both Martin Luther and Karl Marx.

He also had a brief appearance as a Moscow news anchor in Airplane II: The Sequel (1982), He was cast in Mel Brooks’ Young Frankenstein (1974), but his scenes were ultimately cut from the final version.

Askin's credits on Broadway included portraying Mr. Prince in A Temporary Island (1948) and Second Beard in Twentieth Century (1950).

He returned to Vienna in 1994, working again in cabaret and taking roles in opera and Vienna's annual Festwochen festival.

== Death ==
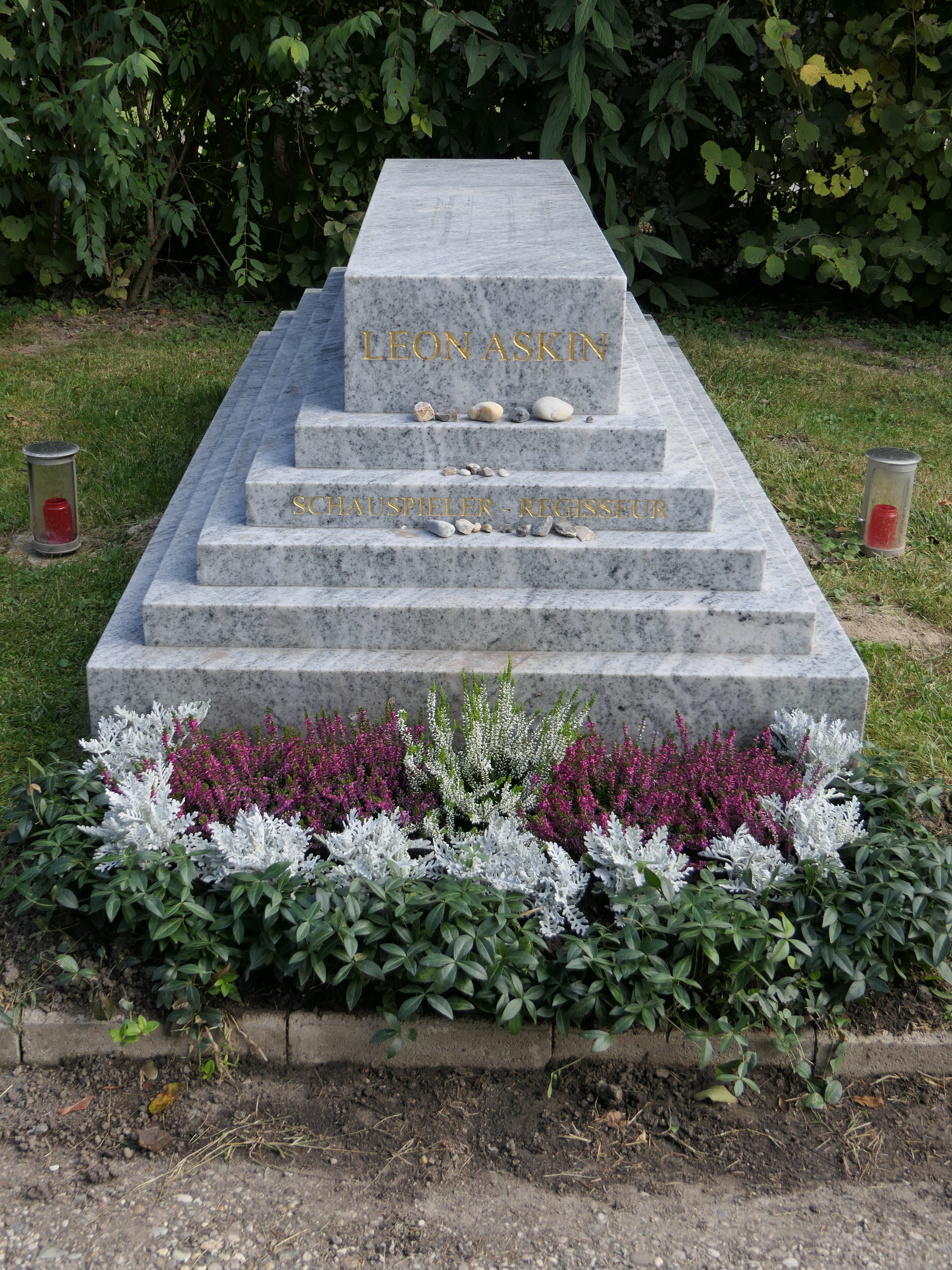
Leon Askin's grave located at Vienna Central Cemetery.

Askin died from natural causes in Vienna on June 3, 2005, at the age of 97 and is interred at Vienna Central Cemetery.

== Filmography ==
=== Film ===
Year	Title	Role	Notes
1952	Assignment – Paris!	Franz	Uncredited
1952	Road to Bali	King Ramayana	
1953	Desert Legion	Maj. Vasil	
1953	South Sea Woman	Pierre Marchand	
1953	China Venture	Wu King	
1953	The Robe	Abidor	
1953	The Veils of Bagdad	Pasha Hammam	
1954	Knock on Wood	Laslo Gromeck	
1954	Secret of the Incas	Anton Marcu	
1954	Valley of the Kings	Valentine Arko	
1955	Carolina Cannonball	Otto	
1955	Son of Sinbad	Khalif	
1955	Spy Chasers	Col. Alex Baxis	
1958	Der Schinderhannes	Rochus Eppelsheimer	
1959	The Last Blitzkrieg	Sergeant Steiner	
1959	Abschied von den Wolken	Gen. Cordobas	
1960	Mistress of the World	Fernando	
1960	Pension Schöller	Fritz Bernhardi	
1960	Until Money Departs You	Dr. Plauert	
1960	Weit ist der Weg	Luiz	
1961	Always Trouble with the Bed	Luigi Papagallo	
1961	Blind Justice	Strafverteidiger Dr. Leupold	
1961	One, Two, Three	Peripetchikoff	
1962	Lulu	Dr. Goll	
1962	The Testament of Dr. Mabuse	Flocke	
1962	Sherlock Holmes and the Deadly Necklace	Charles	
1965	John Goldfarb, Please Come Home!	Samir	
1965	Do Not Disturb	Langsdorf	
1966	What Did You Do in the War, Daddy?	Col. Kastorp	
1967	Double Trouble	Inspector de Groote	
1967	The Caper of the Golden Bulls	Morchek	
1967	The Perils of Pauline	Commisar	
1968	The Wicked Dreams of Paula Schultz	Oscar	
1968	Guns for San Sebastian	Vicar General	
1968	A Fine Pair	Chief Wellman	
1968	God's Police Patrol	Felix	
1968	Lucrezia	Alessandro VI	
1969	The Maltese Bippy	Axel Kronstadt	
1969	Death Knocks Twice	Pepe Mangano	
1972	Hammersmith Is Out	Dr. Krodt	
1973	Doctor Death: Seeker of Souls	Thor	
1973	Genesis II	Overseer	
1973	The World's Greatest Athlete	Dr. Gottlieb	
1974	Young Frankenstein	Herr Waldman	Uncredited / Scene Deleted
1974	Karl May	Klotz-Sello	
1974	Perahim – die zweite Chance		
1975	Parapsycho – Spectrum of Fear		
1981	Going Ape!	Zebrewski	
1982	Airplane II: The Sequel	Moscow Anchorman	
1983	Frightmare	Wolfgang	
1984	A Stroke of Genius		
1985	Savage Island	Luker	
1985	Stiffs	Funeral Director	
1985	First Strike		
1986	Odd Jobs	Don Carlucci	
1987	Deshima	Frank Nievergelt	
1994	OcchioPinocchio	The Psychiatrist	
1994	Höhenangst	Vater Gusenleitner	
1994	Adolf Lanz – Mein Krampf	Josef Lanz von Liebenfels	
1995	Tödliche Liebe		
1998	Black Flamingos – Sie lieben euch zu Tode		
1999	Kubanisch rauchen	Waranovsky	
2001	Ene mene muh – und tot bist du		(final film role)

=== Television ===
Year 1964	Title The Outer Limits (TV series)	Shop Superintendent	Notes S2:E10, Pt.1, The Inheritors, Pt.1
1965-1971	Hogan's Heroes	General Burkhalter	Recurring role; 67 episodes
1967	The Monkees	Nicolai	S2:E9, "The Card Carrying Red Shoes"
1969	Daniel Boone	Roquelin	1 episode
1978	Happy Days	Prof Himmel	S6:E8, "Fearless Malph"
1979	Three's Company	Mr. Hoffmeier	S3:E18, "The Bake-Off"
1982	The Scooby & Scrappy-Doo/Puppy Hour	Additional voices	
1983	Kottan ermittelt	Rudolf Wasservogel	3 episodes
1985	Diff'rent Strokes	Doshenko	Episode: "Russian Embassy"

== Decorations and awards ==
- 1988: Austrian Cross of Honour for Science and Art
- 1994: Silver Medal for Service to the City of Vienna
- 1996: Award of the title "professor"
- 2001: Austrian Cross of Honour for Science and Art, 1st class
- 2002: Gold Medal of Honour for Services to the city of Vienna
- 2003: Goldener Rathausmann of Vienna to mark the 75th anniversary
- 2007: Naming of Leon-Askin-Platz in Vienna-Penzing
- 2007: A bust of Leon Askin in Türkenschanzpark (Vienna)
- 2007: Plaque unveiled at Hütteldorferstrasse 349 in Vienna-Penzing, to mark 100th anniversary of Askin's birth
- 2009: At Sechsschimmelgasse 19 in Vienna-Alsergrund a public housing block was named after him
- 27 May 2010: Leon-Askin-Park at Grundsteingasse in Ottakring (Vienna's 16th District) named after Askin
