= The Go-Go Boys: The Inside Story of Cannon Films =

- Film poster
- Directed by: Hilla Medalia
- Written by: Hilla Medalia; Daniel Sivan
- Produced by: Yariv Horowitz; Roy Lev; Hilla Medalia; Neta Zwebner-Zaibert
- Cinematography: Oded Kirma; Guy Mossman
- Edited by: Daniel Sivan
- Music by: Jonathan Bar Giora
- Production companies: Arte kNow Productions
- Distributed by: Other Angle Pictures
- Release date: May 16, 2014 (Cannes)
- Running time: 86 minutes
- Country: Israel
- Languages: English; Hebrew; French

The Go-Go Boys: The Inside Story of Cannon Films is a 2014 documentary film, produced and directed by Hilla Medalia and written by Medalia and Daniel Sivan.

The film explores the effect of two Israeli cousins, Menahem Golan and Yoram Globus, on Hollywood by producing films and starting one of the most successful independent production companies, Cannon Films. Apart from Golan and Globus, other Hollywood personalities appearing in the film include Sylvester Stallone, Jon Voight, Charles Bronson, Chuck Norris, Michael Dudikoff, Billy Drago, Andrey Konchalovskiy and Franco Zeffirelli.

According to the credits of Electric Boogaloo: The Wild, Untold Story of Cannon Films, after Menahem Golan and Yoram Globus were approached to be interviewed, not only did they deny being interviewed but they also rushed this movie into production. It was released 3 months before the Australian effort.

The film had its world premiere at 2014 Cannes Film Festival on May 16, 2014, in Cannes Classics section.

== Synopsis ==
In the 1980s, two Israeli cousins, Menahem Golan and Yoram Globus, influenced Hollywood by producing over 300 films and starting one of the most successful independent production companies, Cannon Films. Their complex and differing personalities made them successful and eventually led to their downfall.

== Reception ==
The film received mixed reviews from the critics upon its premier at Cannes. Todd McCarthy of The Hollywood Reporter criticized the film, writing "It rather disingenuously ignores two major issues. First, Cannon had very bad taste in movies. Second, there’s precious little discussion, except in the most general terms, of the company’s suspected financial shenanigans." Ultimately the review concluded that "(it shows) A little love for Golan and Globus."

Tom Christie gave the film a negative review for Indiewire, writing "There's nothing particularly special about Hilla Medalia's documentary, The Go-Go Boys: The Inside Story of Cannon Films, other than its subjects, Menahem Golan and Yorum Globus."

Alissa Simon of Variety gave the film a positive review, calling it "both an affectionate tribute and a cautionary tale" and "a solid celebration of Menachem Golan, Yoram Globus and their famous filmmaking empire."

Craig Skinner wrote in his review for Film Divider that "The Go-Go Boys presents a fascinating portrait that goes beyond the films and tells an enthralling story of two men who grasped the American Dream in all four hands. They may not have always been working towards something that was really worth the effort, but whatever they did, they did it with passion."

== See also ==
- Electric Boogaloo: The Wild, Untold Story of Cannon Films, a 2014 Australian-American documentary film
