= Yoram Globus =

Israeli-American film producer

- יורם גלובוס
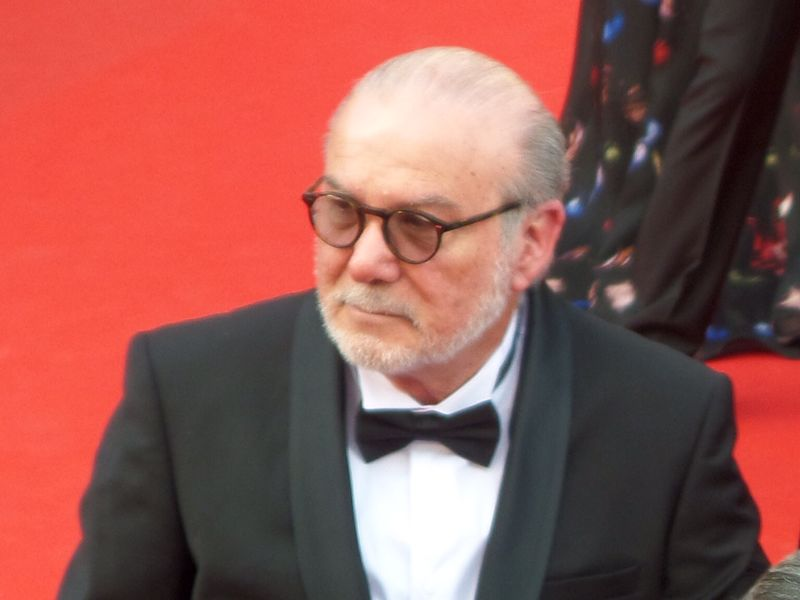
- Globus in 2014
- Born: 7 September 1943 (age 83); Tiberias, Mandatory Palestine (now Israel)
- Occupations: Film producer, cinema owner, distributor
- Known for: Founder of Golan-Globus/The Cannon Group
- Spouses: Edna Lev (m. 1991, divorced) Lea Globus (m. 1993)

Yoram Globus (Hebrew: יורם גלובוס; born 7 September 1943) is an Israeli–American film producer, cinema owner, and distributor. He has been involved in over 300 full-length motion pictures and he is most known for his association with The Cannon Group, Inc., an American film production company, which he co-owned with his cousin Menahem Golan.

Globus played a significant role in developing the Israeli film industry and later became a prominent figure in Hollywood, where he and Golan were nicknamed the "Go-Go Boys" for their fast-paced, low-budget filmmaking style. He is also known for pioneering the "pre-sale strategy" in film financing and for his work in film distribution, including representing major American studios in Israel.

== Early life ==
Yoram Globus was born in Tiberias, on the lake of Galilee, Mandatory Palestine, in 1943 to Jewish parents who immigrated from Poland. When he was three years old, his family moved to the northern city of Kiryat Motzkin. His father, Shmuel, built a cinema, which was unique at that time. When the cinema opened, Globus was 5 years old and very interested in all aspects of the cinema. He would help with whatever his father needed: from hanging posters, serving as a cashier, to promoting movies. At the age of 10 Yoram became the projectionist. During high school he moved to Tel Aviv, where his parents opened another cinema.

Globus graduated business school. He enlisted in the Israel Defense Forces, served as a combat soldier and officer, and retired as a lieutenant.

His cousin is Israeli filmmaker Menahem Golan.

== Career ==
In 1963, Globus partnered with his cousin Menahem Golan, who was already a well-known stage and film director in Israel. Together, they were instrumental in creating the film industry in the country. Over the years they were very successful, building a company that produced movies in Israel, in addition to co-productions in Europe. It became the number 1 production company in Israel. They distributed both European and Israeli movies. For more than 25 years they represented such American studios as Warner Bros., Universal, Paramount and DreamWorks in Israel.

Their most successful projects include Operation Thunderbolt (about the Entebbe raid, which was nominated for the Academy Award for Best International Feature Film), Kazablan (a musical sold to MGM; nominated for the Golden Globe Award for Best Foreign Language Film), Lemon Popsicle (also nominated for the Golden Globe Award for Best Foreign Language Film), I Love You Rosa, and The House on Chelouche Street (both of which were nominated for the Academy Award for Best International Feature Film). They had additional films that represented Israel in many film festivals, such as: Cannes, Berlin, AFM, Milano Film Market, and more.

In the early 1970s, Globus and Golan started to make movies in Europe (Magician of Lublin, based on the book by Isaac Bashevis Singer) and in Hollywood (Lepke with Tony Curtis, which was sold to Warner Bros., and The 4 Deuces, with Jack Palance and Carol Lynley, which was sold to Avco-Embassy).

== Move to the United States ==
In 1978, Globus and Golan moved to Hollywood, where they acquired The Cannon Group, Inc. for $500,000; it was traded on NASDQ for 25 cents a share. They went to the Cannes Film Festival that year and licensed Cannon's movies for approximately $2.5M. After acquiring 51% of the company's shares, they used the money to start making low-budget action movies.

At the beginning of the 1980s, Globus and Golan recognized that home video was the next big thing; they signed actor Chuck Norris for a 7-year exclusive deal, and Charles Bronson for a multiple-picture deal. They also discovered Jean-Claude Van Damme and Michael Dudikoff, signing them for many pictures, and capitalized on the ninja craze, Resulting films from these actions included the Missing in Action films (Chuck Norris), The Death Wish films (Charles Bronson), Bloodsport (Jean-Claude Van Damme), and American Ninja (Michael Dudikoff).

The company elevated the production slate. Aside from the action movies, in 1982, they broadened their approach, producing such movies such as Sahara, starring Brooke Shields, That Championship Season, starring Bruce Dern and Martin Sheen, The Wicked Lady, starring Faye Dunaway, and King Solomon's Mines, starring Richard Chamberlain and Sharon Stone. During this time, the Cannon Group stock was moved to the NY stock exchange and rose in value p from 25 cents in the late 1970s to $48 in 1984. Cannon became the largest independent producer and distributor in the world.

By the mid-1980s, Cannon was producing an average of 40 films per year and had a net worth of over US$1 billion. Because of their fast, low-budget style of filmmaking, Globus and Golan earned the nickname "the Go-Go Boys." Among the films produced by Cannon are Bloodsport with Jean-Claude Van Damme, Superman IV: The Quest for Peace with Christopher Reeve, King Lear directed by Jean-Luc Godard, Runaway Train (1985), Over The Top with Sylvester Stallone, and Street Smart with Morgan Freeman. During this time, Globus and Golan also acquired the film rights to Marvel Comics superhero characters Spider-Man and Captain America.

With Cannon's success, Globus expanded the group's operations into additional territories. Cannon acquired approximately 1,600 cinemas across Europe and the United States (some of which were later purchased by Italian media mogul and future Prime Minister of Italy Silvio Berlusconi), in addition to studios, an extensive film library and additional acquisitions. This widened the activities of Cannon and established the company as a leading conglomerate in the global film industry. During these years, Cannon financed their movies using a new approach, a strategy created and originated by Globus.

This is now known as "the pre-sale strategy". Substantial pre-sales of unproduced films were made based on the strong salesmanship skills of Globus and the promotional advertising created by Design Projects. The financial deposits collected from these pre-sales were used to finance the production of the first film in a Cannon line-up, which when completed and delivered to worldwide theater owners, would generate enough capital to make the next film. For these purposes, Cannon would often commission mock movie posters before they had a script and would display large billboards at sales events such as the Cannes Film Festival.

During 1984, Cannon purchased Thorn EMI Screen Entertainment and their movie library for £175 million. Cannon sold the EMI British Film Library to Weintraub Entertainment Group for approximately $85 million. In 1989, Pathé Communications, a holding company controlled by Italian businessman Giancarlo Parretti, purchased 39.4% of Cannon for 250 million dollars. During that same year, Golan, citing differences with both Parretti and Globus, resigned from his position. He left Cannon and Globus to launch 21st Century Film Corporation, an independent company. In 1990, Globus and Parretti merged Pathé with the Hollywood film studio Metro-Goldwyn-Mayer, resulting in the creation of MGM-Pathé Communications. By then, Globus had become president of MGM.

In 1993, having produced over 300 films, Globus returned to Israel to focus on his home company, Globus Group. This includes a private "Globus" arm with a large film and television studio in Neve Ilan (where various Israeli stations broadcast, such as the Israeli News Company). Globus is responsible for a significant part of the Israeli film distribution industry ("Noah CPP") and owns the public arm "Globus Max," which owns and operates numerous theaters in Israel. In 1999, Globus was given the Ophir Award for "Lifetime Achievement" by the Israeli Academy of Film and Television.

In 2014, two documentary films were made about Golan/Globus and their "Cannon Films" story. Warner Bros released Electric Boogaloo: The Wild, Untold Story of Cannon Films, which was produced by RatPac-Dune Entertainment. That same year, the Israeli documentary The Go-Go Boys: The Inside Story of Cannon Films premiered at the Cannes Film Festival.

In 2015, Globus sold Globus Max and returned to Hollywood to launch a new film production company, Rebel Way Entertainment. The company seeks to reconnect young and web-savvy audiences with the traditional theatrical experience.

== Filmography ==
=== 2000s ===
- Rak Klavim Ratzim Hofshi (Only Dogs Run Free) (2006) (filming) [Producer]
- Melah Ha'arets (Salt of the Land) (2006) [Executive Producer] [Producer]
- All Is Well by Me (2005) [Executive Producer]
- Va, vis et deviens (2005) [associate producer]
- Tipul Nimratz (2002) TV Series [Producer]
- Lemon Popsicle 9: The Party Goes On (2001) [Producer]

=== 1990s ===
- Speedway Junky (1999) [Co-executive Producer]
- Delta Force One: The Lost Patrol (1999) [Producer]
- Hellbound (1994) [Executive Producer]
- Street Knight (1993) [Executive Producer]
- American Cyborg: Steel Warrior (1993) [Executive Producer]
- The Mummy Lives (1993) [Executive Producer]
- Tobe Hooper's Night Terrors (1993) [Executive Producer]
- Lelakek Tatut (Licking the Raspberry) (1992) [Producer]
- Tipat Mazal (A Bit of Luck) (1992) [Producer]
- Delta Force 2: The Colombian Connection (1990) [Producer]
- Lambada (1990/I) [Producer]
- Mack the Knife (1990) [Executive Producer]
- A Man Called Sarge (1990) [Executive Producer]

=== 1980s ===
- The Rose Garden (1989) [Producer]
- Cyborg (1989) [Producer]
- Red Riding Hood (1989) [Producer]
- Kinjite: Forbidden Subjects (1989) [Executive Producer]
- A Journey to the Center of the Earth (1989) [Producer]
- The Secret of the Ice Cave (1989) [Executive Producer]
- Sinbad of the Seven Seas (1989) [Producer]
- Haunted Summer (1988) [Executive Producer]
- Hanna's War (1988) [Co-producer]
- A Cry in the Dark a.k.a. Evil Angels (1988) [Executive Producer]
- Messenger of Death (1988) [Executive Producer]
- Manifesto (1988) [Producer]
- Hero and the Terror (1988) [Executive Producer]
- Puss in Boots (1988) [Producer]
- Salsa (1988) [Producer]
- Powaqqatsi (1988) [Executive Producer]
- Appointment with Death (1988) [Executive Producer]
- Going Bananas (1988) [Producer]
- Gor (1988) [Executive Producer]
- Mercenary Fighters (1988) [Producer]
- Alien from L.A. (1988) [Producer]
- Bloodsport (1988) [Producer]
- Braddock: Missing in Action III (1988) [Producer]
- Doin' Time on Planet Earth (1988) [Producer]
- I giorni randagi (Stray Days) (1988) [Producer]
- Death Wish 4: The Crackdown (1987) [Executive Producer]
- Dancers a.k.a. Giselle (1987) [Producer]
- Surrender (1987) [Executive Producer]
- King Lear (1987) [Producer]
- Tough Guys Don't Dance (1987) [Producer]
- Cannon Movie Tales: Hansel and Gretel (1987) [Producer]
- Barfly (1987) [Executive Producer]
- Masters of the Universe (1987) [Producer]
- Superman IV: The Quest for Peace (1987) [Producer]
- Shy People (1987) [Producer]
- Under Cover (1987) [Producer]
- Mascara (Make-up for Murder) (1987) [Executive Producer]
- American Ninja 2: The Confrontation (1987) [Producer]
- Beauty and the Beast (1987) [Producer]
- The Barbarians (1987) [Producer]
- Down Twisted (1987) [Producer]
- The Hanoi Hilton (1987) [Producer]
- Street Smart (1987) [Producer]
- Number One with a Bullet (1987) [Producer]
- Over the Top (1987) [Producer]
- Assassination (1987) [Executive Producer]
- Business as Usual (1987) [Executive Producer]
- Cannon Movie Tales: The Emperor's New Clothes (1987) [Producer]
- Snow White (1987) [Producer]
- Allan Quatermain and the Lost City of Gold (1986) [Producer]
- Duet for One (1986) [Producer]
- Firewalker (1986) [Producer]
- 52 Pick-Up (1986) [Producer]
- Avenging Force (1986) [Producer]
- Otello (1986) [Producer]
- The Texas Chainsaw Massacre 2 (1986) [Producer]
- Detective School Dropouts (1986) [Producer]
- Invaders from Mars (1986) [Producer]
- Cobra (1986) [Producer]
- Dangerously Close (1986) [Executive Producer]
- America 3000 (1986) [Producer]
- P.O.W. The Escape a.k.a. Behind the Enemy Lines (1986) [Executive Producer]
- Murphy's Law (1986) [Executive Producer]
- The Naked Cage (1986) [Executive Producer] (uncredited)
- Field of Honor (1986) [Producer]
- The Delta Force (1986) [Producer]
- Camorra (1986) [Producer]
- Malkat Hakitah (Prom Queen) (1986) [Producer]
- Salome (1986) [Executive Producer]
- Aladdin (1986) [Producer]
- Fool for Love (1985) [Producer]
- Runaway Train (1985) [Producer]
- King Solomon's Mines (1985) [Producer]
- Death Wish 3 (1985) [Producer]
- The Adventures of Hercules (1985) [Producer]
- The Berlin Affair (1985) [Producer]
- Thunder Alley (1985) [Executive Producer]
- Invasion U.S.A. (1985) [Producer]
- Hot Chili (1985) [Producer]
- American Ninja (1985/I) [Producer]
- Lifeforce (1985) [Producer]
- Déjà Vu (1985) [Producer]
- Rappin' (1985) [Producer]
- The Assisi Underground (1985) [Producer]
- Mata Hari (1985) [Executive Producer]
- Missing in Action 2: The Beginning (1985) [Producer]
- Harimu Ogen a.k.a. Up Your Anchor: Lemon Popsicle 6 (1985) [Producer]
- Hot Resort (1985) [Producer]
- The Lover (Ha-Me'ahev) (1985) [Producer]
- Breakin' 2: Electric Boogaloo (1984) [Producer]
- Missing in Action (1984) [Producer]
- Maria's Lovers (1984) [Executive Producer]
- Exterminator 2 (1984) [Executive Producer]
- Ninja III: The Domination (1984) [Producer]
- Bolero (1984) [Executive Producer]
- Roman Za'ir a.k.a. Baby Love a.k.a. Lemon Popsicle V (1984) [Producer]
- I'm Almost Not Crazy: John Cassavetes, the Man and His Work (1984) [Producer]
- The Naked Face (1984) [Producer]
- Sword of the Valiant (1984) [Producer]
- The Ambassador (1984) [Producer]
- Breakin' (1984) [Executive Producer]
- Over the Brooklyn Bridge (1984) [Producer]
- Love Streams (1984) [Producer]
- Edut Me'ones (Forced Testimony) (1984) [Producer]
- Grace Quigley (1984) [Producer]
- Ordeal by Innocence (1984) [Executive Producer]
- Sahara (1983) [Producer]
- Revenge of the Ninja (1983) [Producer]
- Hercules (1983) [Producer]
- The Wicked Lady (1983) [Producer]
- House of the Long Shadows (1983) [Producer]
- 10 to Midnight (1983) [Executive Producer]
- Treasure of the Four Crowns (1983) [Producer]
- Sababa (1983) [Producer]
- The Seven Magnificent Gladiators (1983) [Executive Producer]
- That Championship Season (1982) [Executive Producer]
- The Last American Virgin (1982) [Producer]
- Hospital Massacre a.k.a. X-Ray (1982) [Producer]
- Death Wish II (1982) [Producer] [Presenter]
- Ahava Ilemeth a.k.a. Mute Love (1982) [Producer]
- Nana, the True Key of Pleasure (1982) [Producer]
- Sapiches a.k.a. Lemon Popsicle IV (1982) [Producer]
- Body and Soul (1981) [Producer]
- Enter the Ninja (1981) [Producer]
- Hot Bubblegum a.k.a. Shifshuf Naim a.k.a. Lemon Popsicle III (1981) [Producer]
- Lady Chatterley's Lover (1981) [Executive Producer]
- New Year's Evil (1980) [Producer]
- The Apple a.k.a. Star Rock (1980) [Producer]
- Dr. Heckyl and Mr. Hype (1980) [Producer]
- Seed of Innocence a.k.a. Teen Mothers (1980) [Producer]
- Schizoid a.k.a. Murder by Mail (1980) [Producer]
- The Happy Hooker Goes Hollywood (1980) [Producer]
- The Godsend (1980) [Executive Producer]

=== 1970s ===
- The Magician of Lublin (1979) [Producer]
- Imi Hageneralit (My Mother the General) (1979) [Producer]
- Nisuin Nusah Tel Aviv (Marriage Tel Aviv Style) (1979) [Producer]
- Going Steady a.k.a. Yotzim Kavua a.k.a. Lemon Popsicle II (1979) [Producer]
- The Uranium Conspiracy a.k.a. Kesher Ha'Uranium a.k.a. A chi tocca, tocca...! (1978) a.k.a. Agenten kennen keine Tränen (1978) [Executive Producer]
- Lemon Popsicle a.k.a. Eskimo Limon (1978) [Producer]
- Yisraelim Matzhikim (It's a Funny, Funny World) (1978) [Producer]
- Operation Thunderbolt a.k.a. Mivtsa Yonatan (1977) [Producer]
- Kid Vengeance a.k.a. Take Another Hard Ride (1977) [Producer]
- God's Gun a.k.a. Diamante Lobo (1976) [Associate Producer]
- The Four Deuces (1976) [Producer]
- Diamonds (1975) [Producer]
- Lepke (1975) [Producer]
- Kazablan (1974) [Executive Producer]
- Abu el Banat a.k.a. Daughters, Daughters (1973) [Executive Producer]
- Ani Ohev Otach Rosa (I Love You, Rosa) (1972) [Executive Producer]
- Shod Hatelephonim Hagadol (The Great Telephone Robbery) (1972) [Producer]
- Jump (1971) [Executive Producer]
- Katz V'Carasso a.k.a. The Contract (1971) [Producer]
- Malkat Hakvish (The Highway Queen) (1971) [Producer]
- Joe (1970) [Executive Producer]
- Lupo! (1970) [Producer]
- Pritza Hagdola, Ha- a.k.a. Eagles Attack at Dawn a.k.a. From Hell to Victory (1970) [Producer]

=== 1960s ===
- Margo Sheli a.k.a. My Love in Jerusalem (1969) [Producer]
- Sam's Song a.k.a. Line of Fire (1969) [Executive Producer]
- Nes B'Ayara a.k.a. A Miracle in Our Town (1968) [Producer]
- Fortuna a.k.a. Seduced in Sodom a.k.a. The Girl from the Dead Sea (1966) [Producer]
- Complica (????) [Producer]
