= Born for Hell =

1976 horror film directed by Denis Héroux

- Promotional poster
- Directed by: Denis Héroux
- Written by: Fred Denger; Denis Héroux; Clement Woods
- Screenplay by: Géza von Radványi
- Story by: Géza von Radványi
- Produced by: Peter Fink; Georg M. Reuther
- Starring: Mathieu Carrière; Debra Berger; Christine Boisson; Myriam Boyer
- Cinematography: Heinz Hölscher
- Edited by: Yves Langlois
- Music by: Voggenreiter Verlag
- Production companies: Studio Film; TIT Filmproduktion GmbH Filmel; Compagnia Cinematografica Champion; Les Productions Mutuelles Ltée; Cinévidéo
- Distributed by: Seaberg Film Distribution (U.S.); Ambassador Film Distributors (Canada)
- Release date: 16 December 1976 (Austin, Texas)
- Running time: 92 minutes
- Countries: West Germany; Canada; France; Italy
- Language: English

Born for Hell (German: Die Hinrichtung, lit. "The Execution"; also released as Naked Massacre) is a 1976 horror film directed by Denis Héroux, and starring Mathieu Carrière, Debra Berger, and Christine Boisson. Its plot follows a disturbed American Vietnam War veteran who, after arriving in Belfast, terrorizes a house full of international female nursing students. The film is set against the historical backdrops of the Northern Ireland conflict and the December Raids in North Vietnam. The screenplay is loosely based on the crimes of mass murderer Richard Speck, who murdered eight nursing students in Chicago, Illinois in 1966.

The websites Letterboxd and The Grindhouse Database list this movie as belonging to the vetsploitation subgenre.

== Plot ==
In late 1972 Belfast, during the early stages of the Northern Ireland conflict, a disturbed American soldier named Cain Adams arrives after deserting in the Vietnam War. Eager to return to the United States, Cain is unable to board a ship from Belfast for approximately one week. While meandering around the city, Cain eventually meets a middle-aged prostitute who propositions him. In her apartment, Cain humiliates her and threatens her with a knife before leaving.

Meanwhile, a group of eight young international female nursing students—Bridget, Christine, Leila, Jenny, Pam, Amy, Catherine, and Eileen—are preparing for their last week of exams before graduation. One afternoon, the women gather in the house they share to celebrate Eileen's birthday. Leila, who is pregnant, eagerly states that her birthday is next and wishes for a small cupboard. Bridget, en route home from a shift at the hospital, witnesses a shooting in the streets that kills a man. Simultaneously, Cain stumbles upon the women's residence, entering through a door in the kitchen. He is met by Amy and Leila, who offer him food and a bottle of wine before sending him on his way. Pam subsequently leaves for her night shift at the hospital.

Later that evening, Christine, alone with Jenny, confesses that she has romantic feelings for her, while Christine attempts to calm Jenny, who is shaken by the death she witnessed earlier that day. Meanwhile, unbeknownst to the women, Cain returns to the house and breaks in through a downstairs window, confronting Jenny and Christine in the living room. Cain rounds the women up, as Amy attempts to negotiate with him, believing he wants to rob them. Holding them at knifepoint, he proceeds to bind their hands, promising to let them go once Pam returns from her night shift. While doing so, he recounts anecdotes from his childhood, including his aunt telling him he was "born for hell" because he regularly missed Sunday church services; on his arm, Cain shows the women a tattoo he has of the phrase.

Cain brings Amy downstairs after leaving the six others bound in an upstairs bedroom. When he attempts to rape Amy, she fights back, leading him to strangle her to death with a belt. He then takes Jenny and Christine downstairs, strips them nude, and attempts to force Jenny to perform oral sex on Christine. When she refuses, Cain beats her with a belt. He then forces Jenny to violently stab Christine to death, before strangling and killing the blood-covered Jenny.

Shortly after, Pam arrives at the house with her coworker Jill, only to find the lights disabled. In the darkness, Cain ambushes the women, stabbing Jill to death first before knifing and killing Pam. After turning the electricity back on, Cain returns upstairs and finds Eileen and Leila missing. He soon locates Eileen, who has hidden in a closet, and stabs her to death. Leila, who has hidden under a bed, watches as Cain proceeds to murder Bridget. Catherine, now in a dissociative state, begins to laugh. Cain brings her downstairs, showing her the corpses of her friends before seating her at the kitchen table, feeding her a piece of Eileen's birthday cake. In her dissociated state, Catherine proceeds to take Cain's switchblade and stabs herself in the chest, committing suicide. Cain returns upstairs, collapsing on the bed under which Leila is hiding, and falls asleep.

At dawn, Cain awakens and leaves the house. Later that morning, he watches from a nearby pub as paramedics remove the bodies of the women from their house and listens to locals discuss the murders. News broadcasts publicize the killer's distinctive tattoo, which Leila has described to authorities. Later, in a public bathroom, Cain attempts suicide by slashing one of his wrists. However, he is discovered by a civilian and taken to a local hospital, where a surgeon tends to his wound. Cain regains consciousness as the surgeon cleans his blood-covered arm, revealing the "born for hell" tattoo. The surgeon looks at him and says, "So it was you." Cain replies, "5000 pounds. It's a lot of money for a man who wants to die."

The film ends with black-and-white photos of the nine nurses.

== Cast ==
- Mathieu Carrière as Cain Adamson
- Debra Berger as Bridget
- Christine Boisson as Christine
- Myriam Boyer as Leila
- Leonora Fani as Jenny
- Ely Galleani as Pam
- Carole Laure as Amy
- Eva Mattes as Catherine
- Andrée Pelletier as Eileen

== Production ==
The film was shot on location in Dublin, with some second unit scenes shot in Belfast, Northern Ireland. Interiors were filmed in the then West Germany. According to actor Mathieu Carrière, the film's producer and co-writer, Géza von Radványi, served a larger role in directing the film than its credited director, Denis Héroux, did.

== Release ==
The film was released in Austin, Texas on 16 December 1976. It later screened in Edmonton, Alberta, Canada in April 1977.

=== Controversy ===
Upon its release in the United States, the film was met with criticism from feminist groups in Austin, Texas, who felt that it was exploitative in its graphic depictions of violence against women. The Austin Rape Crisis Center, the Coalition for Battered Women, the Women's Equity Action League, and Radical Lesbian Feminists were among the groups who held public protests at the film's local release in December 1976.

In France, the film was twice banned in 1976 and 1980, causing Filmel, the distributor, to become insolvent.

=== Home media ===
In 2007, Apprehensive Films released Born for Hell on DVD. Severin Films released the film on Blu-ray on 20 July 2021.
