= Mathieu Carrière =

German actor (born 1950)

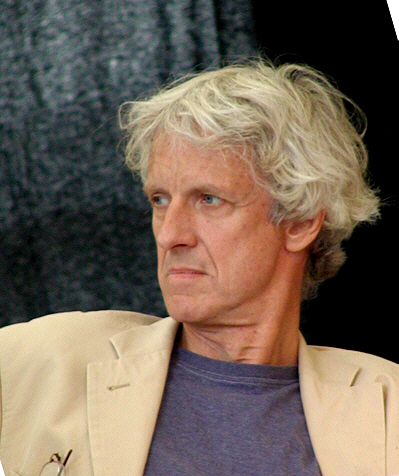
- Carrière in 2004
- Born: 2 August 1950 (age 76); Hanover, West Germany
- Occupations: Actor; writer; director
- Years active: 1964–present
- Relatives: Mareike Carrière (sister)

Mathieu Carrière (German: [maˈtjø kaˈʁjɛʁ]; born 2 August 1950) is a German stage and screen actor. He has appeared in around 250 films worldwide and in 4000 hours of television. Carrière is also a director and a writer and is known as an advocate for the rights of fathers.

== Life ==
Carrière is of French Huguenot descent; he was born near Hanover to psychotherapist parents, and grew up in Berlin and Lübeck. He attended the Jesuit boarding school Lycée Saint-François-Xavier in Vannes, France, a school which had previously been attended by the director of Carrière's first major film, Volker Schlöndorff. In 1969, Carrière moved to Paris to study philosophy with the philosopher Gilles Deleuze and continue his acting.

In 1983, he married the American artist Jennifer Bartlett with whom he had a daughter, Alice Carrière, the author of the Spiegel & Grau memoir Everything/Nothing/Someone that recounts the author's challenging life in their household. They divorced in the early 1990s. He lives in Hamburg and Paris. His sister Mareike Carrière was also an actress.

== Career ==
After playing the young Tonio at the age of 13 in Rolf Thiele's 1964 film Tonio Kröger; he next played a main part in the 1966 German movie Der junge Törless (Young Törless). Other film roles include major appearances in Andrzej Wajda's Gates to Paradise (1967), Harry Kümel's Malpertius (1971) and Roger Vadim's Don Juan, or If Don Juan Were a Woman (1973). Carrière has performed on film with Orson Welles in Malpertuis (1971), Brigitte Bardot in Don Juan, or If Don Juan Were a Woman (1973), Romy Schneider in The Sanssouci Walker (1982) and Isabelle Huppert in Malina (1991).

In 1980, Carrière was a member of the jury at the 30th Berlin International Film Festival.

== Selected filmography ==
- Tonio Kröger (1964), as Tonio Kröger as a Boy
- Young Törless (1966), as Thomas Törless
- Gates to Paradise (1968), as Alexis Melissen
- L'amore breve (1969), as Lorenzo
- La Maison des bories (1970), as Carl-Stéphane Kursdedt
- Le Petit Matin (1971), as Karl
- Rendezvous at Bray (1971), as Julien Eschenbach
- Malpertuis (1971), as Jan
- Man with the Transplanted Brain (1971), as Franz Eckerman
- Bluebeard (1972), as The Violinist
- Don Juan, or If Don Juan Were a Woman (1973), as Paul
- There's No Smoke Without Fire (1973), as Ulrich Berl
- Der Kommissar: Sonderbare Vorfälle im Hause von Professor S. (1973, TV series episode), as Alfred Steger
- Giordano Bruno (1973), as Orsini
- Charlotte (1974), as Eric von Schellenberg
- Serious as Pleasure (1975), as a young man (uncredited)
- Isabelle and Lust (1975), as Luc
- Parapsycho – Spectrum of Fear (1975)
- India Song (1975), as L'attaché d'ambassade allemand
- Vortex (1976), as Tauling
- Naked Massacre (1976), as Cain Adamson
- Police Python 357 (1976), as L'inspecteur Ménard
- Le Jeu du solitaire (1976), as Guy
- Derrick: Das Bordfest (1976, TV series episode), as Walter Solms
- Bait (1976), as Partner
- Coup de Grâce (1976), as Volkmar
- Le Jeune Homme et le Lion (1976, TV film), as Roland
- Bilitis (1977), as Nikias
- The Indians Are Still Far Away (1977), as Matthias
- Ein Mann will nach oben (1978, TV series, 13 episodes), as Karl Siebrecht
- Pareil pas pareil (1978), as Ludwig II of Bavaria
- Derrick: Der L-Faktor (1979, TV series episode), as Heinz Bruhn
- Le Navire Night (1979)
- Woman Between Wolf and Dog (1979), as German Soldier
- The Associate (1979), as Louis
- Ways in the Night (1979)
- Beware of Pity (1979, TV film), as Lt. Anton Hofmiller
- Justocoeur (1980), as Doctor
- Egon Schiele – Exzess und Bestrafung (1980), as Egon Schiele
- The Aviator's Wife (1981), as Christian
- Derrick: Eine ganz alte Geschichte (1981, TV series episode), as Arne Reuter
- Anima – Symphonie phantastique (1981), as Bachelor
- Dantons Tod (1981, TV film), as Saint-Just
- The Temptation (1981, TV film), as Psychiater
- Die Laurents (1981, TV series), as Frédéric Laurent
- La Passante du Sans-Souci (1982), as Ruppert von Leggaert / Federico Logo
- The Old Fox: Der Tote im Wagen (1983, TV series episode), as John Malven
- A Woman in Flames (1983), as Chris
- Benvenuta (1983), as François
- The Old Fox: Perfektes Geständnis (1984, TV series episode), as Jochen Holmer
- After Your Decrees (1984), as Obersturmführer Knoch
- The Bay Boy (1984), as Father Chaisson
- Angela's War (1984), as Thomas Schmidt
- Matt in 13 Zügen (1984, TV series), as Claus Korff
- The Last Civilian (1984, TV film), as Lt. Träger
- The Future of Emily (1984), as Friedrich (voice)
- Yerma (1984), as Víctor
- Abschied in Berlin (1985), as Fischhändler
- L'Amour en douce (1985), as Carl
- Mary Ward (1985), as Reiter
- Beethoven's Nephew (1985), as Archduke Rudolf
- Bras de fer (1985), as von Bleicher
- Spenser: When Silence Speaks (1986, TV series episode), as du Pré
- Terminus (1987), as Doctor (voice)
- Johann Strauss: The King Without a Crown (1987), as Eduard Strauss
- Love Rites (1987), as Hugo Arnold
- Derrick: Mordträume (1988, TV series episode), as Max Binder
- The Abyss (1988), as Pierre de Hamaere
- Sanguines (1988), as Johann
- El placer de matar (1988), as Andrés
- Francesco (1989), as Man in the Lateran Palace (uncredited)
- Fool's Mate (1989, also directed)
- Quantum Leap: Honeymoon Express (1989, TV series episode), as Roget
- Una ombra en el jardí (1989), as Luis
- The Betrothed (1989, TV miniseries), as Count Attilio
- Rock Hudson (1990, TV film), as French Doctor
- Rosamunde (1990), as Oskar
- Hungarian Requiem (1990), as Örnagy
- Aschenglut (1990)
- Malina (1991), as Malina
- Success (1991), as Erich Bornhaak
- Manila (1991), as Carlos
- Cómo levantar 1000 kilos (1991), as Schneider
- Shining Through (1992), as Von Haefler
- Christopher Columbus: The Discovery (1992), as King John
- Un placer indescriptible (1992), as Vivaldi
- Die Zeit danach (1992)
- Schloß Hohenstein (1992–1995, TV series, 13 episodes), as Count Gregor von Hohenstein
- Böses Blut (1993, TV film), as Werner Westfal
- Eurocops: Flamingo (1993, TV series episode), as Dr. Bosch
- Oh God, Women Are So Loving (1994), as Daniel
- Nur eine kleine Affäre (1994, TV miniseries), as Victor
- Die Kommissarin: Schatten der Vergangenheit (1994, TV series episode), as Erich Markwald
- L'amour conjugal (1995), as Anchire
- Tödliche Liebe (1995)
- Faust: Mordpoker (1995, TV series episode), as H.C.
- Tatort: Bei Auftritt Mord (1996, TV series episode), as Lewald
- Doppelter Einsatz: Wunder auf Bestellung (1996, TV series episode), as Kinzel
- A Girl Called Rosemary (1996, TV film), as Fribert
- Desert of Fire (1997, TV miniseries), as François Legrand
- Tatort: Manila (1998, TV series episode), as Wehling
- El far (1998), as Mike
- On the Wings of Love (1999), as Michael
- The Old Fox: Die Wahrheit ist der Tod (1999, TV series episode), as Stefan Achatz
- Küstenwache: Das letzte Ufer (2000, TV series episode), as Fabian Keusch
- Inspector Rex: The Full Moon Murderer (2000, TV series episode), as Prof. Paul Mandl
- Ternitz, Tennessee (2000), as Plastic surgeon
- Judas (2001, TV film), as Pontius Pilate
- Thomas (2001, TV film), as Pontius Pilate
- Utta Danella: Die Hochzeit auf dem Lande (2002, TV series episode), as Arndt Graf Solm-Weltingen
- High Speed (2002), as Lucas
- Regarde-moi (2002), as Pierre
- Ein Fall für zwei: Erics Tod (2003, TV series episode), as Armin Steiner
- Luther (2003), as Cardinal Cajetan
- The Ride (2003), as Lucas
- Hans Christian Andersen: My Life as a Fairytale (2003, TV film), as Otto
- Tears of Kali (2004), as Edgar Cornelsen (segment "Kali")
- Der Ermittler: Schönheitsfehler (2004, TV series episode), as Dr. Schönemann
- Arsène Lupin (2004), as Le duc d'Orléans
- The Clan (2005)
- Pfarrer Braun: Adel vernichtet (2005, TV series episode), as Baron Friedrich von Falkenberg
- Die Rosenheim-Cops: Mord im Paradies (2005, TV series episode), as Ferdinand Buxner
- Your Name Is Justine (2005), as Gunter
- Du bist nicht allein (2007), as Regisseur
- Les murs porteurs (2007), as André
- The Fakir of Venice (2008), as Massimo
- The Dispensables (2009), as Gerhardt Rott
- Alarm für Cobra 11: Bounty on Kim Krüger (2010, TV series episode), as Rolf Reinhardt
- The Holy Land of Tyrol (2010), as Capitaine
- Sans queue ni tête (2010), as Robert Masse
- Slave (2012)
- Der letzte Bulle: Es lebe der Sport (2012, TV series episode), as Henri Durand
- Leipzig Homicide: Stilbruch (2012, TV series episode), as Harry Reich
- The Mark of the Angels – Miserere (2013), as Peter Hansen
- The Tunnel (2013, TV series), as Alain Joubert
- False Freedom (2013), as Vollmann
- To Life! (2014), as Knoch / Hannes Frisch
- Look 4 Them (2014), as Gallery Owner
- Rhein-Lahn Krimi: Jammertal (2017), as Siegfried Brecht
- Vollmond (2017), as Hermann Zuber
- Joyce (2019)
- Breakdown Forest - Reise in den Abgrund (2019), as Der Billionär
- Sans Tête (2024), as Moderator
