= Parapsycho – Spectrum of Fear =

- Original title: Parapsycho - Spektrum der Angst
- Directed by: Peter Patzak
- Written by: Peter Patzak; Géza von Radványi
- Story by: Georg M. Reuther
- Starring: Marisa Mell; Mascha Gonska; Mathieu Carrière; William Berger; Leon Askin; Debra Berger; Helmut Förnbacher
- Cinematography: Atze Glanert
- Music by: Manuel Rigoni; Richard Schönherz
- Production companies: TIT Filmproduktion GmbH; Viktoria Film
- Distributed by: Cinerama Filmgesellschaft MBH
- Release date: May 2, 1975 (West Germany)
- Running time: 105 minutes
- Country: Austria
- Language: German

Parapsycho – Spectrum of Fear (German: Parapsycho - Spektrum der Angst) is a 1975 Austrian horror film directed by Peter Patzak, starring Marisa Mell, Leon Askin and Debra Berger. Split into three episodes, it uses extrasensory perception, reincarnation and telepathy as its subject matter. Even in the school of New German Cinema, the film was ground-breaking for using footage of a real autopsy, beginning with the incision of the body from sternum to pubic bone, rather than recreating the scene using prosthetics or special effects.

== Cast ==
Reinkarnation:

- Marisa Mell – Greta
- Peter Neusser – Harry
- Leon Askin – The old man

Metempsychose:

- Mascha Gonska – Mascha, eine Medizinstudentin
- William Berger – Pathologie-Professor, ihr Liebhaber
- Signe Seidel – seine Frau
- Debra Berger – Debbie, beider Tochter

Telepathie:

- Mathieu Carrière – Mario, Kunstmaler
- Alexandra Drewes – Barbara, die junge Braut
- Helmut Förnbacher – der junge Bräutigam
- Heinz Marecek – Marios bester Freund
- Jane Tilden – Marios Mutter
