= Carolina Cannonball =

1955 film by Charles Lamont

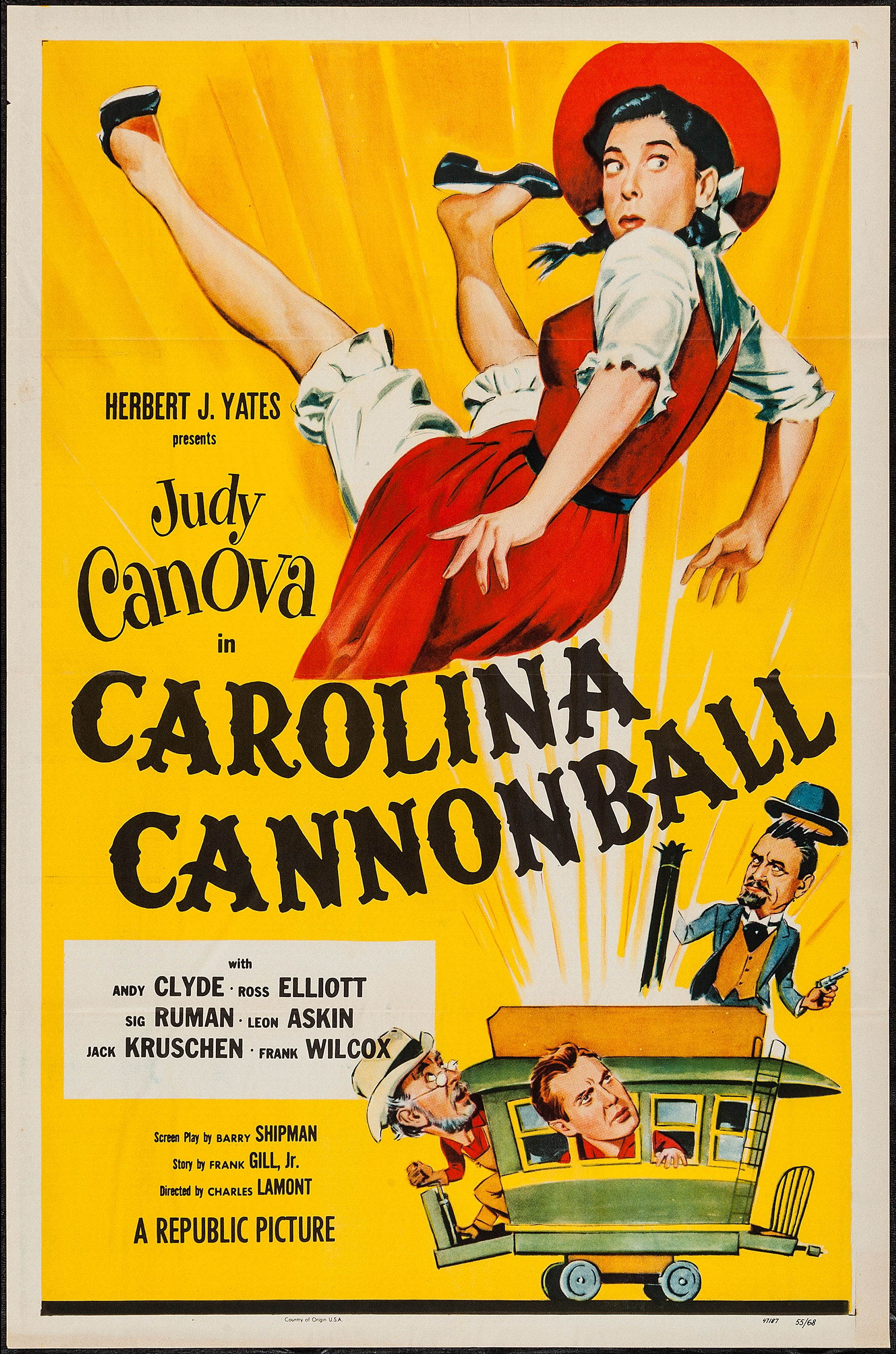
- Theatrical release poster
- Directed by: Charles Lamont
- Written by: Frank Gill; Barry Shipman
- Produced by: Sidney Picker
- Starring: Judy Canova; Leon Askin
- Cinematography: Reggie Lanning
- Edited by: Tony Martinelli
- Music by: R. Dale Butts
- Distributed by: Republic Pictures
- Release date: January 28, 1955
- Running time: 73 minutes
- Country: United States
- Language: English
- Budget: $297,207
- Box office: $218,495

Carolina Cannonball is a musical comedy film, released by Republic Pictures in 1955.

== Plot ==
During the testing of an experimental nuclear-powered rocket by the US Government, the rocket's guidance system is hijacked by three enemy agents of an unnamed foreign power. A malfunction causes the rocket to crash in the middle of the Nevada desert. Knowing its general location, the enemy agents go in search of it.

They arrive at the small depot of Cosmos Junction, where a branch line railroad with a temperamental steam-powered streetcar named the "Carolina Cannonball" is operated by Judy Canova and her grandfather. The three enemy agents ride the streetcar to the other end of the line—the gold mining ghost town of Roaring Gulch—and check into the deserted hotel there, pretending to be uranium prospectors. When the enemy agents have a radioactivity-detecting device shipped to them at the junction next day, the shipment is spotted by a US Government agent, Don Mack, hot on their trail. He likewise pretends to be a uranium prospector and is taken to Roaring Gulch.

Using their detector to get a rough location for the fallen rocket, the enemy agents steal away with the Carolina Cannonball, but its boiler fails, and they abandon it on the middle of the line and walk back to Roaring Gulch. In the meantime, Mack searches their hotel room, but the agents return and realize he was there. Unaware of any of the newcomers' true identities, Judy helps the enemy agents track down Mack, thinking him to be a common thief, but encourages them to reconcile. While the enemy agents are interrogating Mack, Judy notices the Carolina Cannonball is missing, and goes with her grandfather to look for it. Finding their streetcar broken down, they repair the busted boiler with the remains of the nuclear rocket, which had crashed nearby. Judy takes some of the parts of the rocket to use as jewelry, but their radiation sets off the enemy agents' detector, causing them to question Judy. Hearing her story, the enemy agents leave in search of the lost rocket; Mack is left to explain to Judy the whole situation.

Grandpa departs for the junction in the Carolina Cannonball, with Judy and Mack in tow trying to get help. But the streetcar encounters the enemy agents along the track, who board and attempt to hijack the streetcar by force. A fight ensues, and the enemy agents are subdued and tied up. However, when the brakes fail, the overpowered Carolina Cannonball is unable to stop at the junction, and roars onto the railroad mainline, headed straight for Las Vegas. Aware that the atomic power supply is unstable and likely to explode catastrophically, Mack throws orders at the next station to have the vehicle taken out by the Air Force. Meanwhile, the enemy agents break loose, and order Judy, Mack, and Grandpa off the train. The three jump to safety, moments before the Carolina Cannonball is destroyed by Air Force jets. Later, Judy, Mack, and Grandpa give a demonstration to US government officials of a working model of what was the world's "first nuclear-powered streetcar".

== Cast ==
- Judy Canova as herself
- Andy Clyde as Grandpa Rutherford Canova
- Ross Elliott as Don Mack
- Sig Ruman as Stefan
- Leon Askin as Otto
- Jack Kruschen as Hogar
- Frank Wilcox as Professor
- Emil Sitka as Technician

== Reception ==
After distribution, advertising and prints the film recorded a loss of $191,459.

== See also ==
- List of American films of 1955
