= Katya Berger =

English actress

Katya Bebb Cobham (Berger) (born 13 December 1966) sometimes credited as Katia Berger or Katja Berger, is a film actress.

== Biography ==
Katya Berger was born on 13 December 1966 in London, England. She is the daughter of Hugh Russell Bebb and Croatian singer and actress Hanja Kochansky. She is the step-daughter of veteran Austrian actor William Berger, known for his roles in Spaghetti Western. Katya's half-brother is former child actor Kasimir Berger, and she is the step-sister of actress Debra Berger.

She appeared in a series of films from 1978 to 1983, often in very sexually explicit roles and scenes. After a hiatus of over two decades from acting, she returned to the screen in Ingrid Gogny's short film, 13/14.

She quit acting to be a stay-at-home mom of two children with her husband.

== Filmography ==
- Piccole labbra (1978) .... Eva
- An Almost Perfect Affair (1979) .... Maria & Freddie's Daughter
- Storie di ordinaria follia or Tales of Ordinary Madness (1981) .... Girl on beach
- Rosso sangue (1981) .... Katia Bennett
- Nana (1982) .... Nana
- La Lune dans le caniveau (1983) (as Katia Berger) .... Catherine
- 13/14 (2004) (as Katia Berger) .... Carole, la marraine
- That Day (2007)
