= Nana, the True Key of Pleasure =

1983 Italian drama film

- Promotional poster
- Directed by: Dan Wolman
- Written by: Marc Behm
- Based on: Nana by Émile Zola
- Produced by: Yoram Globus; Menahem Golan
- Starring: Katya Berger; Jean-Pierre Aumont; Mandy Rice-Davies; Debra Berger; Shirin Taylor; Yehuda Efroni; Paul Muller
- Cinematography: Armando Nannuzzi
- Edited by: Ursula West
- Music by: Ennio Morricone
- Production company: The Cannon Group
- Release date: April 1983 (U.S.)
- Running time: 92 minutes
- Countries: Italy; United States
- Language: English

Nana, the True Key of Pleasure (Italian: Nana: La vera chiave del piacere) is a 1983 English-language Italian comedy drama film directed by Dan Wolman, loosely based on Émile Zola's 1880 novel Nana. The music is by Ennio Morricone. The film was produced by Yoram Globus and Menahem Golan.

== Plot ==
Winsome Nana performs as an attraction in the magic show of Mellies the magician at the Minotaure, including in erotic shadow play and "moving photographs". She afterwards puts in work as a prostitute. Zoe acts as her confidante and chambermaid. Many rich and influential men are besotted by Nana's youthful beauty and want to make her their own. The banker Steiner buys her a house, but she soon throws him out and uses it to pursue her business.

At one point, Nana hosts an erotic hunt for her guests, who can watch through looking glasses a real-life pornographic show unfold itself before their eyes. She also engages in a lesbian encounter with Satin, one of the female customers at the Minotaure. Count Muffat and his son Hector are equally besotted by Nana. When she is introduced to the prizefighter Bijou, she gets Muffat to sponsor him; Bijou is killed in a fight to the death, the count is ruined, and eventually, he and his family are evicted from their residence by Steiner the banker who has rigged the fight.

When Muffat complains to Nana about his ruin, she reveals to him that his wife has been cheating on him with Faucherie, an intrigue which she has previously arranged, and the men fight each other in a duel. Nana then ruins the wedding of young Hector Muffat when she elopes with him in a horse-drawn carriage. Eventually, however, there is honour among thieves: Muffat becomes minister of the interior, sponsored by Faucherie, and Nana leaves in a hot air balloon for India to meditate – taking yet another beau along for the ride.

== Cast ==
- Katya Berger as Nana
- Shirin Taylor as Zoe, Nana's maid
- Jean-Pierre Aumont as comte de Muffat (count Muffat)
- Mandy Rice-Davies as Sabine, comtesse de Muffat
- Marcus Beresford as Hector Muffat
- Yehuda Efroni as Steiner, the banker
- Massimo Serato as Faucherie, journalist for Le Figaro
- Annie Belle as Rennée de Chéselles, fiancée of Hector
- Debra Berger as Satin
- Paul Muller as Xavier
- Tom Felleghy as Mellies the magician
