= Hanja Kochansky =

Croatian writer and actress

Hanja Kochansky is a Croatian writer and actress.

A refugee to Italy during the Second World War, in 1948 she went to Johannesburg as an emigrant. In 1966, she played one of Elizabeth Taylor's handmaidens in the film Cleopatra.

In 1972, her book, Freely Female: Women's Sexual Fantasies, was published by Ace Books in New York and was on the reading list for women’s studies programmes at a number of American universities. It was published by Aim Books in Australia in 1975 and by Granada Publishing Ltd. in the UK in 1977.

She married Hugh Bebb in 1963. They had a daughter, Katia, in 1966. In 1974, she had a son, Kasimir, with the Spaghetti Western actor, William Berger. He starred with his father in the TV mini-series, Christopher Columbus in 1985. He also acted in the film Absurd a.k.a. Rosso sangue (1981) with his mother and sister.

After living in Rome for thirty years, she moved to London in 2010.

From 10 March to 19 June 2011, a photograph of her taken by Ida Kar was displayed on the walls of the National Portrait Gallery.

== Filmography ==
- Danger Man (1 episode, 1966, TV episode "The Paper Chase") .... Paula
- Rosso sangue (1981) .... Mrs. Bennett
- Liebeskonzil (1982) .... Purgue
- La famiglia (1987) (as Hania Kochansky) .... Susanna
- Una casa a Roma (1988) (TV)
- La cena (1998)
- Uomini & donne, amori & bugie (2003)
