= William Berger (actor) =

American actor (1928–1993)

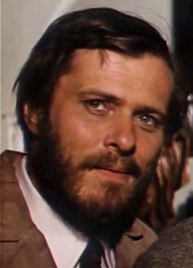
- Berger in 1967
- Born: Wilhelm Thomas Berger; June 20, 1928; Innsbruck, Austria
- Died: October 2, 1993 (aged 65); Los Angeles, California, United States
- Other names: Bill Berger; Wilhelm Berger
- Occupation: Actor
- Children: 6, including Debra and Katya Berger

William Berger, also known as Bill Berger and Wilhelm Berger, born Wilhelm Thomas Berger (June 20, 1928 – October 2, 1993) was an Austrian actor, mostly associated with Euro and spaghetti Westerns.

== Biography ==
=== Career ===
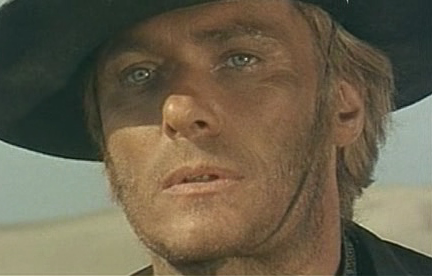
Berger in Face to Face (1967)

A former roommate of Keith Richards, his earliest work was in Broadway theatre, but while visiting Italy, he was cast in his first Western, Break Up, in 1965. A series of Westerns followed, including Face to Face (1967), Today We Kill, Tomorrow We Die! (1968), If You Meet Sartana Pray for Your Death (1968), Sabata (1969), and Keoma (1975). He also starred in the horror films Five Dolls for an August Moon, My Dear Killer, Monster Shark, and The Murder Clinic.

Berger was heavily into drug experimentation, which frequent co-star Brett Halsey said sometimes interfered with filming, recounting one incident where they were shooting a scene on horseback and without warning Berger leant forwards and slid off his horse. In the early 1970s, Berger spent some time in an Italian prison, having been wrongly accused of possession of hashish and cocaine, but resumed his acting career after his release. His later fare included Super Fly T.N.T. (1973), Oil! (1977), Hercules (1983), and The King's Whore (1990). His 1985 memoirs, Half Way Home, recount his life to that point.

Berger collaborated with his good friend, famed Spanish horror film director Jesus Franco, appearing in seven of his films: The Sinister Eyes of Dr. Orloff, Night of the Killers, Faceless, Golden Temple Amazons, Love Letters of a Portuguese Nun, Dirty Game in Casablanca, and A Captain of 15 Years.

== Personal life ==
Berger was married five times and was father to five children (and adopted a sixth).

He had three children with his first wife Marjorie Berger: daughters Carin Berger (born in 1952) and actress Debra Berger (born March 17, 1957), and son Wendell Nelson Berger (born December 28, 1972). After his marriage to Marjorie ended, he married actress Carolyn Lobravico. While Berger was busy in Italy with the filming of The Murder Clinic, Carolyn was arrested for drug possession. She died in prison from peritonitis. Charged with illegal drug possession, Berger stayed in jail until he was released in March 1971.

His third marriage was to singer and actress Hanja Kochansky. They had one child together, a son Kasimir Berger (born in London on October 7, 1974). Berger was also stepfather to actress Katya Berger, the daughter of Hanja Kochansky from a previous relationship. Berger starred with his son Kasimir in the TV miniseries Christopher Columbus and Tuareg – The Desert Warrior.

After his divorce from Kochansky, he married his fourth wife, Dörte Völz. With her, he had a son named Alexander Völz.

His fifth and last marriage was to Linda Berger.

William Berger died on October 2, 1993, in Los Angeles, California, of cancer. Director Jesus Franco was particularly upset by his passing, speaking of his grief in various interviews. Franco mentioned in a DVD interview (an extra feature on the DVD The Sinister Eyes of Dr. Orloff) that Berger died from some type of brittle bone disease.

== Selected filmography ==
- Back Street (1961) - Airport Attendant (uncredited)
- Von Ryan's Express (1965) - Man from the Gestapo (uncredited)
- Break Up (1965) - Benny (segment "L'uomo dei 5 palloni") (uncredited)
- Ringo's Big Night (1966) - Jack Balman / Ringo
- The Murder Clinic (1966) - Dr. Robert Vance
- Cisco (1966) - El Cisco
- A Bullet for the General (1967) - Bill 'Niño' Tate (English version, voice, uncredited)
- Her Harem (1967) - Mario
- The Day the Fish Came Out (1967) - Man in Bed
- Face to Face (1967) - Charley 'Chas' A. Siringo
- Today We Kill, Tomorrow We Die! (1968) - Francis 'Colt' Moran
- Every Bastard a King (1968) - Roy Hemmings
- Il suo nome gridava vendetta (1968) - Sam Kellogg
- If You Meet Sartana Pray for Your Death (1968) - Lasky
- Beyond Control (1968) - Velte
- A Noose for Django (1969) - Everett 'Bible' Murdock
- Köpfchen in das Wasser, Schwänzchen in die Höh’ (1969) - Grüner, Filmproduzent
- Sabata (1969) - Banjo
- Ombre roventi (1970) - Caleb
- La colomba non deve volare (1970)
- Five Dolls for an August Moon (1970) - Prof. Gerry Farrell
- Sartana in the Valley of Death (1970) - Lee Calloway aka Sartana
- They Call Him Cemetery (1971) - Duke
- My Dear Killer (1972) - Giorgio Canavese
- The Big Bust Out (1972) - Bob Shaw
- La vita in gioco (1972) - Andrea
- The Sinister Eyes of Dr. Orloff (1973) - Dr. Orloff
- Una colt in mano al diavolo (1973) - Isaac McCorney
- Il giustiziere di Dio (1973) - Padre Tony Lang
- Super Fly T.N.T. (1973) - Lefebre
- ...E il terzo giorno arrivò il corvo (1973) - The Crow
- Verflucht dies Amerika (1973) - Doc Holliday
- Fasthand (1973) - Machedo
- Man with the Golden Winchester (1973) - Mathias Boyd
- …altrimenti vi ammucchiamo (1973) - Angelo Biondo
- Un capitán de quince años (1974) - Negoro
- Three Tough Guys (1974) - Captain Ryan
- Situation (1974) - Ralf
- La noche de los asesinos (1974) - Baron Simon Tobias
- La merveilleuse visite (1974)
- Terminal (1974) - Rudolph Arnheim
- Parapsycho – Spectrum of Fear (1975) - Professor
- The Career of a Chambermaid (1976) - Franz
- Nick the Sting (1976) - Roizman
- Big Pot (1976)
- And Agnes Chose to Die (1976) - Clinto
- Keoma (1976) - William Shannon
- Oil! (1977) - Bill Mann
- Love Letters of a Portuguese Nun (1977) - Father Vicente
- California (1977) - Mr. Preston
- Per questa notte (1977)
- Wifemistress (1977) - Count Brandini
- Porco mondo (1978) - Senator Alberici
- Comincerà tutto un mattino: io donna tu donna (1978) - Luciano
- Die Totenschmecker (1979) - Felix
- I viaggiatori della sera (1979) - Cocky Fontana
- Holocaust parte seconda: i ricordi, i deliri, la vendetta (1980) - Col. Hans
- Day of the Cobra (1980) - Jack Goldsmith
- Ripacsok (1981)
- Bosco d'amore (1981)
- The Girl from Trieste (1982) - Charly
- Diamond Connection (1982) - Inspector
- Ironmaster (1983) - Mogo
- Hercules (1983) - King Minos
- Il momento dell'avventura (1983) - Doyle
- Hanna K. (1983) - German journalist
- El asesino llevaba medias negras (1984)
- Monster Shark (1984) - Prof. Donald West
- Tiger: Springtime in Vienna (1984) - Phillip Marboe
- Moving Targets (1984) - Broschat
- Christopher Columbus (1985, TV Mini-Series) - Francisco de Bobadilla
- The Adventures of Hercules (aka Hercules 2) (1985) - King Minos
- Dirty Game in Casablanca (1985) - Dean Baker
- Tex and the Lord of the Deep (1985) - Kit Carson
- The Berlin Affair (1985) - The Professor
- The Fifth Missile (1986, TV Movie) - Dr. Strickland
- Tarot (1986) - Mittler
- Golden Temple Amazons (Les amazones du temple d'or) (1986) - Uruck the Temple Guardian / Priest
- The Death of Empedocles (1987) - Kritias
- Control (1987) - Mr. Peterson
- Strike Commando (1987) - Maj. Harriman (English version, voice, uncredited)
- Distant Lights (1987) - Dr. Montanari
- Django Strikes Again (1987) - Old Timer
- Hell Hunters (1988) - Karl
- The Brother from Space (1988) - Colonel Grant
- Alien Terminator (1988) - Alonso Quintero
- Il nido del ragno (1988) - Mysterious Man
- Dial Help (1988) - Prof. Irving Klein
- Bachi da seta (1988)
- Maya (1989) - Salomon Slivak
- I'm Dangerous Tonight (1990) - Penck
- Lex Minister (1990)
- The King's Whore (1990) - Le Comte Longhi
- Un amore sconosciuto (1991) - Piero
- Buck ai confini del cielo (1991) - Grandpa Thomas
- Berlin '39 (1993) - Ernest
- 18000 giorni fa (1993) - Rosenbaud (uncredited)
