= Matt in 13 Zügen (TV series) =

- Starring: Gudrun Landgrebe; Mathieu Carrière
- Country of origin: West Germany

Matt in 13 Zügen is a West German crime television series that launched in 1984. It ran for 1 season of 13 episodes before promptly ending.

== See also ==
- List of German television series
