= Hercules (1983 film) =

1983 film by Luigi Cozzi

- Theatrical release poster by Drew Struzan
- Directed by: Luigi Cozzi
- Written by: Luigi Cozzi
- Produced by: Yoram Globus; Menahem Golan
- Starring: Lou Ferrigno; Sybil Danning; Brad Harris; Ingrid Anderson; Rossana Podestà; Mirella D'Angelo; William Berger
- Cinematography: Alberto Spagnoli
- Edited by: James Beshears; Sergio Montanari
- Music by: Pino Donaggio
- Production company: Cannon Italia
- Distributed by: MGM/UA Distribution Co. (United States); Columbia Pictures (International)
- Release date: 26 August 1983 (U.S.)
- Running time: 98 minutes
- Countries: Italy; United States
- Languages: English; Italian
- Budget: US$2.5–3.5 million
- Box office: $11 million (North America)

Hercules is a 1983 fantasy film written and directed by Luigi Cozzi and starring bodybuilder-turned-actor Lou Ferrigno, Brad Harris, Sybil Danning, and William Berger. It is loosely based on Greek mythology, plus elements of Cozzi's earlier science fiction opus Starcrash. It received mostly negative reviews, but was a modest financial success. Ferrigno reprised his role in the 1985 sequel, The Adventures of Hercules.

== Premise ==
The film is a retelling of the story of Hercules battling the wizard King Minos, who uses "science" in an attempt to take over the world. Hercules must stop him and rescue his beloved princess Cassiopea.

== Cast ==
Character	Original actor	English voice
Hercules	Lou Ferrigno	Marc Smith
Ariadne	Sybil Danning	Pat Starke
Augias	Brad Harris	Unknown
Cassiopea	Ingrid Anderson	Unknown
King Minos	William Berger	Unknown
Hera	Rossana Podestà	Susan Spafford
Circe	Mirella D'Angelo	Denise Bryer
King Xenodama	Bobby Rhodes	Unknown
Valcheus	John Garko	Ted Rusoff
Dorcon	Yehuda Efroni	Unknown
Athena	Delia Boccardo	Unknown
Zeus	Claudio Cassinelli	Unknown
The Thief	Frank Garland	Unknown
Queen Alcmene	Gabriella George	Unknown
Sostratos	Ralph Baldassar	Unknown
King Amphitryon	Steven Candell	Edward Mannix
Chambermaid	Valerie Montanari	Unknown
The Friend	Roger Larry	Unknown
Dedalos	Eva Robbins	Unknown
Narrator	N/A	Anthony La Penna

Giovanni Cianfriglia and Mindi Miller also appear in bit parts.

== Production ==
=== Development ===
The revival of Hercules was motivated by the hype surrounding 1982's Conan The Barbarian. Menahem Golan also told Luigi Cozzi that he was a fan of the old Italian peplums, and wanted to make one as soon as he opened an Italian branch of his Cannon Films outfit. Several competing Hercules efforts were planned at the time, such as Enzo Castellari's Anno 2000: Ercole a Nueva York or Sergio Corbucci's Hercules 1984/Hercules 2000, neither of which eventuated. According to a Knight Ridder columnist, demand for the character prompted consideration of a re-release of the Steve Reeves films for mid-1982.

The film was revealed to the press in March 1982, with photography slated for May. It was then to be directed by Bruno Mattei and produced by his frequent partner, Israeli Alexander Hacohen. The project was later split into two separate films, Hercules and Hercules and the Seven Gladiators, to be shot back-to-back. According to co-star Sybil Danning, the second feature was squeezed in when difficulties with special effects slowed down pre-production for several weeks. Finally, the additional film was repackaged as a standalone product simply called The Seven Magnificent Gladiators, in which Lou Ferrigno played a different character named Han.

Gladiators was shot first, but Mattei had misfortunes during its making. Two conflicting versions exist. Mattei claims that Cozzi conspired to have him removed by denigrating the planned script for Hercules, and tempting Cannon with a more effects-driven vision. According to Cozzi, Cannon was simply displeased with the dailies of The Seven Magnificent Gladiators, and so fired Mattei. They then signed him to direct some reshoots for Gladiators, and for the entirety of Hercules, because he was already under contract with them for a tentative sequel to Starcrash. American John Thompson also replaced Hacohen as producer.

=== Writing ===
Upon the film's announcement, Ricardo Ghione was briefly listed as the screenwriter, but he was soon replaced by Mattei regular Claudio Fragasso. Under Mattei and Fragasso, it was intended as a much more straightforward re-imagining of 1958's Hercules. When Cozzi was brought in, he was given just two weeks to complete his screenplay, so as to minimize delays and extra payments to Ferrigno, who was already in Rome working on Seven Magnificent Gladiators. Cozzi's eventual version mixes peplum and science fiction, with influences ranging from The Colossus of Rhodes and Atlantis, the Lost Continent to Superman and Star Wars.

Author Gary Allen Smith notes that aside from the cleaning of the Augean stables, the Twelve Labours of Hercules are seldom represented on screen. Additionally, he romances Cassiopeia, which does not happen in the Greek myth, and is the orphaned son of King Amphitryon of Thebes, which contradicts it outright. Ferrigno also insisted that the script be excised of its more adult elements, as he held a responsibility toward the child audience. According to Danning and her manager, the character of Ariadne was originally much stronger, as she seduced Hercules to make him her instrument of conquest, and dueled him to the death after their falling out. However, it was greatly scaled back in the rewrites.

=== Casting ===
Playing Hercules means more to me than playing The Hulk. Honestly, it means more to me than winning the Mr. Olympia contest. Hercules is my all-time fantasy hero. He is the most famous strongman-hero in history. For a bodybuilder, Hercules is the ultimate.

— Lou Ferrigno

The titular part was presented to Ferrigno shortly after the end of The Incredible Hulk's TV run. In his September 1982 interview for Muscle & Fitness, he explained that he idolized Hercules and fellow bodybuilder-turned-actor Steve Reeves since he was a child. He signed the contract for Hercules five days after it was offered to him, even though he had previously rejected several different projects. He was also pleased to find a role that combined his musculature with a broader acting range than he was allowed as Bruce Banner's alter ego.

Several actors, including co-stars Danning and Brad Harris, returned from The Seven Magnificent Gladiators. Danning had gotten along poorly with Ferrigno during the making of that film. She returned, but was asked to relinquish the part of Circe, his love interest, and take that of evil princess Ariadne, which was later scaled back. As a result, Danning made unflattering comments about Ferrigno and his wife Carla Green's supposed insecurities during the film's promotion, which annoyed Cannon boss Menahem Golan. Press materials claimed that Harris, a former Hercules who played the role in 1962's The Fury of Hercules, had come out of retirement for the chance to appear with Ferrigno, although there is no evidence that this was true, as he had been regularly employed in the years prior. Rossana Podestà was another actress associated from the glory days of sword-and-sandal films, having previously starred in 1956's Helen of Troy. Gianni Garko, a veteran of many Italian genres, had also done many peplums. At an early stage, Swedish beauty queen Mary Stävin was attached to the female lead Cassiopea.

=== Training ===
Before he left for Italy, Ferrigno trained under bodybuilding promoter Joe Weider. He also received weapons training from famed Italian swordmaster and actor Enzo Musumeci Greco. Ferrigno maintained a strict schedule during the shoot, waking up at 5 a.m. five days a week. He worked out at the American Health Club of Rome, where his presence always drew a crowd of fitness enthusiasts. He started growing his beard right after accepting the role, and did so for 8 weeks.

Ferrigno said that he weighed 286 pounds (130 kg) with 3 percent body fat during Hercules, which was in line with his Hulk shape. He deemed it the best condition of his entire life at the time of filming, which he reiterated after his retirement. He dedicated a chapter of his 1996 Guide to Personal Power, Bodybuilding, and Fitness to his conditioning for the film.

=== Filming ===
Hercules was filmed in Italy shortly after The Seven Magnificent Gladiators, with one source claiming one week between. Photography was slated to begin on July 12. However, another source indicates that it actually started in August. Although the film was more fantasy-oriented than Seven Magnificent Gladiators, locations include the former Latomie di Salone quarry, Arenauta Beach in Gaeta, the Great Cascade in Tivoli, and the Monte Gelato waterfalls, which were already used in its predecessor. Cozzi focused on those exteriors during the first weeks, which bought some time to prepare the sets his revised screenplay had introduced. They were built at Stabilimenti De Paolis and Elios Studios in Rome.

Although early publicity materials touted a respectable budget of $6 million, the amount quoted to Italian media during production was a more modest ITL3.5 billion, or about $2.5 million. Pre-release, the budget was pegged at a higher ITL5 billion, or about $3.5 million. Those financial limitations were apparent at numerous points. The animal costume used in the infamous bear fight was the same as in Ator, the Fighting Eagle, and it had to be supplemented with stock footage from Grizzly. The collapse of Minos (William Berger)'s palace was also lifted from 1951's Quo Vadis. The film features about 400 effects shots created under the direction of Armando Valcauda, who returned from Cozzi's Starcrash. Ferrigno was effusive about Valcauda's work, saying that he was "on his way to becoming another George Lucas".

Although Ferrigno sensed a measure of skepticism from the Italian crew at first, he felt that he gained their increasing respect through the shoot, culminating in an ovation after he successfully performed the stone throw. As finding a double of comparable size proved impossible, Ferrigno performed most of his stunts, except in water as he could not swim. He also was given the opportunity to choreograph most of his action sequences. He struggled on a few occasions, such as during the fight with the centurion, where he was hampered by a foot injury incurred during his bodybuilding career. Some sources mention that Ferrigno tore a calf during the bear fight, although another only mentions that he twisted his ankle. He suffered a cut on his knee during the stone throw sequence, and accidentally cut a stuntman during a sword fight.

=== Post production ===
Ennio Morricone was initially announced as the film's composer, but when Cozzi showed him some dailies and asked him to emulate the style of Bernard Hermann's score for the Ray Harryhausen movies, Morricone asked to be removed from the project. Cozzi personally chose Pino Donaggio to replace him. Ferrigno was not aware that his voice would be dubbed over until he attended the film's premiere. According to Mirella D'Angelo, she was the only local actor to voice their character in the Italian version.

== Release ==
=== Promotion ===
Joe Weider's Muscle & Fitness made a strong push for Hercules, making it the cover story for its September 1982 and March 1983 issues. The article written for the latter was reprinted almost intact by Cannon as a pressbook for the film. Prior to the general release, Ferrigno appeared at club Nine Lansdowne in Boston on July 5, 1983, which was billed as his "World Premiere" appearance as Hercules. Although the actor did show up in costume, the film does not seem to have been screened on that occasion.

On July 8, 1983, a special showing of the film was held in Los Angeles. Ferrigno wore a cape in a Roman chariot, pulled behind two white horses down Hollywood’s Sunset Boulevard. Although special permission had been obtained for the stunt, an unaware policeman pulled Ferrigno over for his vehicle's failure to display a registration plate. The movie was entered into the inaugural Brussels International Fantastic Film Festival held between November 4 and 12, 1983, where the response was unflattering.

=== Theatrical ===
Hercules opened in the U.S. on 26 August 1983 through MGM, under its output deal with Cannon. It was originally slated for August 12. The date was the subject of negotiations with Filmpartners, which was planning a re-issue of Hercules in New York in the same window. The film ranked fourth at the North American box office for its opening weekend, earning $3,473,635. It ultimately grossed $11 million in the market. In a retrospective interview, MGM's Frank Yablans rebuked Cozzi's claim that the film had been a great success, but conceded that "it was a hit in comparison to all the other garbage [Cannon] gave us." In Italy, the film was distributed by C.E.I.A.D., an affiliate of Columbia Pictures, and retained its English-language title. In the capital of Rome, it premiered on January 20, 1984.

=== Television ===
In Italy, the film was broadcast on television before it appeared on home video, premiering on Italia 1 on 27 December 1984.

=== Home media ===
Hercules arrived on VHS and Betamax through MGM/UA Home Video on 22 February 1984. In Italy, the video was not released until the second week of August 1988 by RCA/Columbia Pictures International Video.

== Critical reception ==
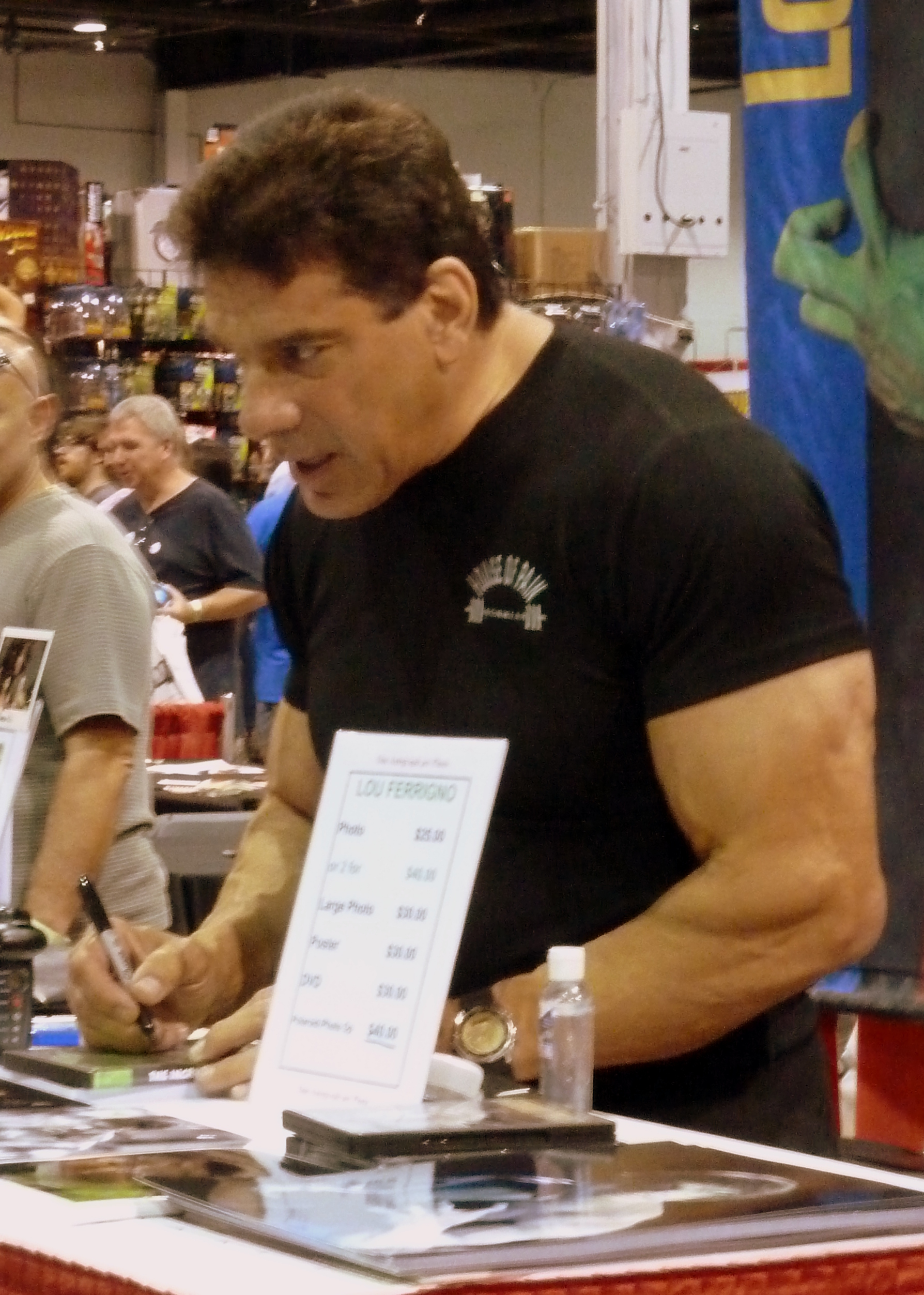
Lou Ferrigno received mixed reviews for his performance, although most critics agreed that his look fit the role.

=== Contemporary ===
Hercules received largely negative reviews from critics, with many finding that it failed to live up to both contemporary and older inspirations. Michele Anselmi of Italian daily l'Unità derided "a revival that borders on the ridiculous" and penned his review in the form of a letter to Hercules, urging him to retire from film. Kansas City Star critic Robert C. Trussell called it even less satisfying than "low-budget Italian-made mythological epics of two decades ago". Marylynn Uricchio of the Pittsburgh Post-Gazette called it "even worse than the Steve Reeves version from the '50s". Variety said that "somehow, this isn't the Hercules children of the 1950s and 1960s knew and loved."

The film's look was a frequent point of criticism. Some critics were reminded of the practical effects of Clash of the Titans, but the comparisons were unfavorable, with The Pittsburgh Press' Ed Blank calling it a "chintzy rerun" of that film. Lawrence Van Gelder of The New York Times called out the "sometimes less than special effects". Andrew Adler from The Louisville Courier-Journal deemed that they "would have looked silly in a Buck Rogers serial of the 1930s". Ben Steelman of the Wilmington Star-News found them "tacky". Chris Walters of the Austin American-Statesman was kinder than most, assessing that "[k]ids 10 and under would likely enjoy the movie, clunky and unconvincing as it is." Henry Edgar of Virginia's The Daily Press was most positive, labeling it "a lavish spectacle", "packed with action and color in epic proportions".

The writing also came under scrutiny. Walters found that most of the audience, by now used to the "more persuasive premises of the Spielberg/Lucas axis, may be bored". Blank criticized shallow characters which "lay the big questions upon us, but don't bother answering them". Adler deemed it "so haphazardly structured it could have been shot in a week". Uricchio criticized the narration and much of the dialogue as "ludicrous". Italian Catholic publication Segnalazioni cinematografiche derided the "naive and laughable" tone. Van Gelder declared that "[n]o good will come of detailing how this film's narrative departs from classical mythology to traffic in baser materials from Superman to Star Wars"

Ferrigno received mediocre grades in the title role. Adler found that his "interpretation rarely goes beyond flexing his pectorals, but at least he looks earnest". Uricchio deemed that "Ferrigno's only requirement is to arrange his face in the appropriate expression, and this he does well." On the other hand, Edgar called Ferrigno's leading role "a major flaw", adding that "his massive body can't compensate for the lack of expertise." Steve Watkins of the Tallahassee Democrat concurred and observed that Ferrigno is "no actor". Variety opined that "[a]lthough dubbed by another, Lou Ferrigno is perfectly affable, and physically (if not physiognomically) he more than lives up to his billing." Writing for Wilmington Star-News, Steelman noted that "Ferrigno makes Arnold Schwarzenegger look like a 90-pound weakling", as he "flexes his pectorals frequently", and added that the bodybuilder is "obviously supposed to appeal to the mommies in the audience". Kansas City Star's Trussell agreed it was mostly a physical performance, writing that "Mr. Ferrigno grunts, puffs, sweats and flexes a lot in the title role".

=== Retrospective ===
On Rotten Tomatoes, the film has a 25 percent rating based on 8 reviews, with an average rating of 2.2/10.

Francesco Mininnin of Magazine italiano TV found that "Cozzi tries to rekindle the success of the mythological genre [...] But the era of musclemen is gone, and Lou Ferrigno really is not a worthy actor." In his Movie Guide, Leonard Maltin called the movie "silly" and "special-effects-laden", but mentioned that Ferrigno "is undeniably well cast". Writing for AllMovie, Eleanor Mannikka summed it up as a "difficult challenge to conquer", and her colleague Jeremy Wheeler wrote: "Completely surreal and immensely cheesy, Luigi Cozzi's first Hercules film is an effort in excess [that picks ups] where his amazing Starcrash left off." In his book Epic Films, Gary Allen Smith remarked that "the production design is imaginative, considering the limitations of the budget, but the visuals are often marred by poor quality of the special effects." He also found that Ferrigno made for a "thoroughly convincing Hercules". In 2014, Decider named Ferrigno the tenth "hottest onscreen Hercules ever". When Starburst re-reviewed the film in 2016, Andrew Husk deemed that "this film does have some appeal. As with all cult movies, they are for a very specific audience. [...] It is a fun adventure film, by the poor dialogue and awful characters making it more of a comedy than a serious fantasy film."

=== Accolades ===
Year	Award	Category	Subject	Result	Ref.
1983	Brussels International Fantastic Film Festival	Golden Raven	—N/a	Nominated	
1983	Stinkers Bad Movie Award	Worst Picture	—N/a	Shortlisted	
1984	Golden Raspberry Award	Worst Actor	Lou Ferrigno	Nominated	
1984	Golden Raspberry Award	Worst New Star	Lou Ferrigno	Won	
1984	Golden Raspberry Award	Worst Supporting Actress	Sybil Danning	Won	
1984	Golden Raspberry Award	Worst Screenplay	Luigi Cozzi	Nominated	
1984	Golden Raspberry Award	Worst Picture	Menahem Golan, Yoram Globus	Nominated	

== Sequel ==
A sequel, The Adventures of Hercules, was released in Italy on 2 May 1985.

== See also ==
- List of Italian films of 1983
- List of films featuring Hercules
