= Christopher Columbus (miniseries) =

- Written by: Adriano Bolzoni; Alberto Lattuada; Tullio Pinelli; Laurence Heath
- Directed by: Alberto Lattuada
- Starring: Gabriel Byrne; Rossano Brazzi; Oliver Reed; Raf Vallone; Max von Sydow; Eli Wallach; Faye Dunaway
- Music by: Riz Ortolani
- Countries of origin: Italy; United States; France; West Germany
- Original language: English

Production
- Executive producers: Malcolm Stuart; Ervin Zavada
- Producers: Silvio Clementelli; Anna Maria Clementelli
- Cinematography: Gianlorenzo Battaglia; Franco Di Giacomo
- Editor: Russell Lloyd
- Running time: 360 minutes
- Production companies: Lorimar Productions; RAI-Televisione Italiana

Original release
- Network: RAI
- Release: 7 March – 28 March 1985
- Network: CBS
- Release: 19 May – 9 June 1985

Christopher Columbus is a television miniseries broadcast in Italy and the United States in 1985. In six hours, the series told the story of the life of Christopher Columbus, with Gabriel Byrne starring as the explorer.

== Production ==
The series was a co-production between Radiotelevisione Italiana and Lorimar Television, with other European partners. Columbus expert Paolo Emilio Taviani worked as a historical consultant. Shooting took place in Malta, Spain and the Dominican Republic over a period of 26 weeks, with six months of post-production in London. The New York Times reported the series' total cost as $15 million.

== Cast ==
- Gabriel Byrne as Christopher Columbus
- Rossano Brazzi as Diogo Ortiz de Villegas
- Virna Lisi as Dona Moniz Perestrello
- Oliver Reed as Martin Pinzon
- Raf Vallone as Joseph Vecinho
- Max von Sydow as John II of Portugal
- Eli Wallach as Hernando de Talavera
- Nicol Williamson as Ferdinand II of Aragon
- Faye Dunaway as Isabella I of Castile
- Michel Auclair as Luis de Santángel
- William Berger as Francisco de Bobadilla
- Keith Buckley as De Torres
- Mark Buffery as Bartholomew Columbus
- Anne Canovas as Beatriz Enriquez
- Elpidia Carrillo as Coana
- Massimo Girotti as Duke of Medinaceli
- Larry Lamb as Don Castillo
- Stefano Madia as Federico
- Audrey Matson as Dona Felipa Perestrello
- Murray Melvin as Padre Linares
- Jack Watson as Padre Marchena
- Patrick Bauchau as Don Rodrigo
- Salvatore Borgese as Juan
- Scott Coffey as Vallejo
- Cyrus Elias as Alaminos
- Francesco Lattuada as De Triana
- Iris Peynado as Selina
- Erik Schumann as Benguela
- Gregory Snegoff as Francisco Pinzon
- Hal Yamanouchi as Guacanabo

== Reception ==
John J. O'Connor, reviewing for The New York Times, praised the series' period look and Byrne's performance in the title role, though he felt that the first half was stronger dramatically than the second.

== Awards ==
The series was nominated for two Emmy Awards, for best art direction and costume design for a miniseries.
