= Cindy Leadbetter =

American model and actress (born 1955)

- Born: June 15, 1955 (age 70); Los Angeles, California, U.S.
- Occupations: Actress; model
- Years active: 1978–1985

Cindy Ann Leadbetter (born June 15, 1955) is an American model and actress.

Born in Los Angeles, California, in 1977 Cindy Leadbetter arrived in Rome on vacation and, fallen in love of the city, she decided to stay in Italy. Within a year, she appeared as playmate in Playmen and in the Italian edition of Playboy and made her film debut in Luigi Cozzi's Starcrash. Later she appeared in a number of films, mostly in secondary roles, and worked on stage with Lara Saint Paul in Lara's Saffo Show.
