= Carolyn De Fonseca =

American actress

Carolyn De Fonseca (25 May 1929 – May 2009) was an American actress based in Rome. She worked extensively as a voice actress for the English-language dubbing of several hundred foreign (mostly Italian) films from the early 1960s and onwards. She was also the wife of actor/voice dubber Ted Rusoff, with whom she frequently worked. She died in 2009.

== Career ==
De Fonseca first came to Rome in the early 1960s and tried to make a career for herself as an actress. She played a small role in the acclaimed A Difficult Life (1961), directed by Dino Risi, and had a supporting role as Chloe, the love potion maker, in the sword and sandal film Damon and Pythias (1962). She also had bit part roles in some big productions that did shooting in Italy, such as Barabbas (1961) and The Pink Panther (1963). She never really found much success as an actress but she quickly became a prolific and successful voice dubbing artist.

Some of her earliest dubbing work were in the peplum films Mole Men Against the Son of Hercules (1961) and Ursus in the Valley of the Lions (1961), in which she provided the voice of actress Moira Orfei in the English dubbed versions of the film. Subsequently, De Fonseca dubbed a series of further peplum film and she was also given the chance to dub the voice of American actress Jayne Mansfield in two of her European films which were post-synchronized without Mansfield's involvement: Primitive Love (1964) and Dog Eat Dog (1964). She also provided Mansfield's voice in the infamous quasi-documentary The Wild, Wild World of Jayne Mansfield (1968). Released after Mansfield's death, this mondo-style cult documentary consists of footage of Mansfield visiting various night clubs and beaches while narrating her experiences. Since Mansfield died before the film's completion, De Fonseca performs the task of voicing Mansfield's thoughts and narration.

In the 1960s, De Fonseca dubbed many leading ladies into English, but eventually became more prolific in dubbing villainesses in various sword and sandal and horror films. After a supporting role in the caper film Midas Run (1969) with Fred Astaire and Richard Crenna, she would give up her acting career and focus solely on dubbing films into English. She specialized in voicing femme fatale characters such as the evil queen (played by Jany Clair) in Hercules vs. the Moon Men (1964), a bitchy tourist (played by Silvia Solar) in Eyeball (1975) and the deranged inmate Albina in Women's Prison Massacre (1983). She would also typically dub exotic figures or upper-class nymphomaniacs, such as a sex-hungry asylum patient (played by Rosalba Neri) in Slaughter Hotel (1971), and a sassy, black nightclub performer (played by Carla Brait) in The Case of the Bloody Iris (1972). De Fonseca would also sometimes deliver very over the top performances; dubbing the voices of sobbing and hysterical figures such as a paranoid asylum patient (played by Rossella Falk) in Seven Blood-Stained Orchids (1972), a sexually frustrated housewife (played by Carroll Baker) in My Father's Wife (1976), and a drug-addicted nun (played by Anita Ekberg) in The Killer Nun (1978).

As the Italian film industry was slowing down somewhat in the 1980s, De Fonseca resumed her career as a film actress in various American films that were shot in Rome, while still continuing to work with dubbing. On screen she played Christopher Reeve's secretary in Monsignor (1982), had a supporting role in the Pia Zadora film The Lonely Lady (1983), played a comedic role as an American tourist in Detective School Dropouts (1986) and finally appeared in Bernardo Bertolucci's The Sheltering Sky (1990). On television, she appeared in the highly acclaimed miniseries The Winds of War (1983). She also appeared alongside her real-life husband Ted Rusoff in the miniseries Mussolini and I (1985), in which they play the parents of Mussolini's mistress, Claretta Petacci, and played a supporting part in the TV movie thriller The Fifth Missile (1986).

== List of dubbing roles (incomplete) ==
Year	Film	Role	Actress
1961	Mole Men Against the Son of Hercules	Queen Halis Mosab	Moira Orfei
1961	Ursus in the Valley of the Lions	Diar	Moira Orfei
1963	Thor and the Amazon Women	Black Queen	Janine Hendy
1963	The Whip and the Body	Nevenka Menliff	Daliah Lavi
1964	Dog Eat Dog	Darlene	Jayne Mansfield
1964	Hercules vs. the Moon Men	Queen Samara	Jany Clair
1964	The Last Man on Earth	Ruth Collins	Franca Bettoia
1964	The Long Hair of Death	Mary Karnstein/Helen Karnstein	Barbara Steele
1964	Primitive Love	Dr. Jane	Jayne Mansfield
1965	Bloody Pit of Horror	Kinojo	Moa Tahi
1965	Red Dragon	Carol	Rosanna Schiaffino
1965	Terror-Creatures from the Grave	Cleo Hauff	Barbara Steele
1966	Killers Are Challenged	Sheena Coleman	Wandisa Guida
1966	Secret Agent Super Dragon	Charity Farrel	Marisa Mell
1966	The Murder Clinic	Gisèle de Brantome	Françoise Prévost
1967	Mission Stardust	Dr. Sheridan	Ann Smyrner
1968	The Great Silence	Regina	Marisa Merlini
1968	Run, Man, Run	Penny Bannington	Linda Veras
1969	The Sisters	Diana	Nathalie Delon
1969	Venus in Furs	Olga	Margaret Lee
1969	A Woman on Fire	Clarissa Renos	Françoise Prévost
1970	Queens of Evil	Bibiana	Ida Galli
1970	Shadow of Illusion	Gail Bland	Daniela Giordano
1971	Blackie the Pirate	Isabel	Silvia Monti
1971	The Feast of Satan	Andrea	Teresa Gimpera
1971	Slaughter Hotel	Anne Palmieri	Rosalba Neri
1971	The Strange Vice of Mrs. Wardh	Carol	Cristina Airoldi
1972	The Case of the Bloody Iris	Mizar Harrington	Carla Brait
1972	Don't Torture a Duckling	Maciara	Florinda Bolkan
1972	Manhunt	Trini	Francesca Romana Coluzzi
1972	The Red Queen Kills Seven Times	Lulu Palm	Sybil Danning
1972	Seven Blood-Stained Orchids	Elena Marchi	Rossella Falk
1972	Shadows Unseen	Simona	Marilù Tolo
1972	Smile Before Death	Gianna	Rosalba Neri
1972	So Sweet, So Dead	Rossella	Jessica Dublin
1973	Amarcord	Mathematics Teacher	Dina Adorni
1973	Seven Deaths in the Cat's Eyes	Suzanne	Doris Kunstmann
1973	Torso	Prostitute	Rosaria Della Femmina
1973	War Goddess	Oreitheia	Sabine Sun
1974	The Arena	Cornelia	Rosalba Neri
1974	The Eerie Midnight Horror Show	Luisa	Lucretia Love
1974	The Last Desperate Hours	Laura Monachesi	Silvia Monti
1974	Spasmo	Clorinda	Monica Monet
1974	White Fang to the Rescue	Katie	Gisela Hahn
1974	What Have They Done to Your Daughters?	Mrs. Talenti	Clara Zovianoff
1975	Blonde in Black Leather	Miele	Monica Vitti
1975	Deep Red	Gianna Brezzi	Daria Nicolodi
1975	Emanuelle's Revenge	Emanuelle	Rosemarie Lindt
1975	Eyeball	Gail Alvarado	Silvia Solar
1975	The Killer Must Kill Again	Norma Mainardi	Teresa Velázquez
1975	Season for Assassins	Rossana	Magali Noël
1975	Silent Action	Mrs. Martinetti	Loredana Nusciak
1975	Strip Nude for Your Killer	Gisella Montani	Giuliana Cecchini
1975	Syndicate Sadists	Flora	Femi Benussi
1976	The Big Racket	Anna Rossetti	Anna Zinnemann
1976	Black Emanuelle 2	Susan	Dagmar Lassander
1976	Emanuelle in America	Diana Smith	Maria Piera Regoli
1976	Gestapo's Last Orgy	Alma	Maristella Greco
1976	My Father's Wife	Laura	Carroll Baker
1976	SS Camp 5 - Women's Hell	Kapo Greta	Patrizia Melega
1976	SS Experiment Love Camp	Dr. Renke	Patrizia Melega
1976	Violent Naples	Gervasi's wife	Maria Grazia Spina
1977	Achtung! The Desert Tigers	Dr. Lessing	Lea Lander
1977	Beast With a Gun	Giuliana Caroli	Marisa Mell
1977	Blood and Diamonds	Maria	Olga Karlatos
1977	The Cynic, the Rat, the Fist	Maria Balzano	Gabriella Giorgelli
1977	Messalina, Messalina	Agrippina	Lory Wagner
1977	Return of the 38 Gang	Rosy	Dagmar Lassander
1977	Suspiria	Olga	Barbara Magnolfi
1977	The Pajama Girl Case	Quint's Neighbor	Vanessa Vitale
1977	Watch Me When I Kill	Esmeralda Messori	Bianca Toccafondi
1978	Blazing Flowers	Nadina	Anna Maria Rizzoli
1978	The Bloodstained Shadow	Signora Nardi	Juliette Mayniel
1978	The Killer Nun	Sister Gertrude	Anita Ekberg
1978	Satan's Blood	Mary	Sandra Alberti
1978	The War of the Robots	Lois	Malisa Longo
1979	Beyond the Darkness	Iris	Franca Stoppi
1979	Escape From Hell	Katie	Cintia Lodetti
1979	Hotel Paradise	Muriel	Ajita Wilson
1979	Tigers in Lipstick	Maria	Monica Vitti
1980	Anthropophagus	Julie	Tisa Farrow
1980	The Day of the Cobra	Lola	Lecinia Lentini
1980	Erotic Nights of the Living Dead	Fiona	Dirce Funari
1980	Hell of the Living Dead	Josie	Esther Mesina
1980	Inferno	Carol	Alida Valli
1980	Macabre	Jane Baker	Bernice Stegers
1981	Absurd	Mrs. Bennett	Hanja Kochansky
1981	Burial Ground: The Nights of Terror	Evelyn	Mariangela Giordano
1981	The House by the Cemetery	Laura Gittleson	Dagmar Lassander
1981	Murder Obsession	Glenda	Anita Strindberg
1982	Piranha II: The Spawning	Jai	Carole Davis
1982	Ator, the Fighting Eagle	Indun	Laura Gemser
1982	Nathalie	Della Jackson	Grazia De Giorgi
1982	The New York Ripper	Scellenda's landlady	Rita Silva
1982	Pieces	Grace	Hilda Fuchs
1982	The Scorpion with Two Tails	Heather Hull	Wandisa Guida
1982	Sweet Body of Bianca	Jill	Grazia De Giorgi
1982	The Sword of the Barbarians	Aki	Yvonne Fraschetti
1982	Violence in a Women's Prison	Hertha	Françoise Perrot
1983	The Final Executioner	Edra	Marina Costa
1983	Hell Behind Bars	The Warden	Rita Silva
1983	Hell Penitentiary	Warden Landers	Rita Silva
1983	The Seven Magnificent Gladiators	Lucilla	Mandy Rice-Davies
1983	Throne of Fire	Princess Valkari	Sabrina Siani
1983	Women's Prison Massacre	Albina	Ursula Flores
1984	Monster Dog	Sandra	Victoria Vera
1984	The Violent Breed	Madame Fra	Danika La Loggia
1985	Jungle Raiders	Maria Janez	Marina Costa
1985	Miami Golem	Joanna Fitzgerald	Laura Trotter
1985	Phenomena	Frau Brückner	Daria Nicolodi
1986	Bridge to Hell	Vanja	Francesca Ferré
1986	The Devil's Honey	Carol Simpson	Corinne Cléry
1986	The Kiss of the Cobra	Maria	Milly D'Abbraccio
1987	Iron Warrior	Deeva	Iris Peynado
1988	The Murder Secret	Nora Hamilton	Adriana Russo
1988	Ratman	Terry	Janet Ågren
1988	The Red Monks	Ramona Curtis	Lara Wendel
1989	Alien From the Deep	Jane	Marina Giulia Cavalli
1989	The Bronx Executioner	Margie	Margit Evelyn Newton
1989	The House of Lost Souls	Daria	Licia Colò
1989	The House of Witchcraft	Sharon Mason	Marina Giulia Cavalli
1991	Millions	Margherita	Florinda Bolkan
1991	Voices From Beyond	Hilda Mainardi	Frances Nacman
1995	The Strange Story of Olga O.	Sheila Altman	Florinda Bolkan
