= Ted Rusoff =

Canadian actor, voice over artist (1939–2013)

- Born: May 20, 1939; Winnipeg, Manitoba, Canada
- Died: September 28, 2013 (aged 74); Rome, Italy
- Occupations: Actor; voice over artist; director; screenwriter

Ted Rusoff (May 20, 1939 – September 28, 2013) was a Canadian voiceover artist, actor, vocal coach, and translator specializing in the adaptation and translation from and into various languages of synchronized dialogue for the dubbing of films and cartoons. Highly prolific with over 100 credits to his name, Rusoff is best remembered for his work adapting and performing English-language dialogue for countless Italian genre films.

As an actor, he had appeared in more than 70 films. Fluent in many languages, he was often called upon for work as language/accent/dialogue consultant for dubbings, theatre, and cinema. He worked many times as a stage-director for regular plays and as stage-director and music-coach for opera in houses in Marseille, Copenhagen, Munich, Prague, Riga, Montevideo, Tokyo, Auckland, and elsewhere. He was active as a choral director, known for his "Liebslieder Waltzes" and other choral masterpieces by Brahms, as well as the music of composers of the Baroque period.

== Life and career ==
Born in Winnipeg, Manitoba, Rusoff was the son of screenwriter and film producer Lou Rusoff and the nephew of Samuel Z. Arkoff, the head of American International Pictures. Rusoff started his career as a singer, appearing in operas, musical comedies, and on the road in various cities in Canada and the United States with his guitar during the folk-singing boom of the late 1950s and early 1960s. He specialized in foreign language songs, including Ghanaian and Māori. He also appeared in nearly all the Gilbert and Sullivan operas, acting in a wide variety of roles. He toured with a trio called The Catch Club, along with his fellow music students from UCLA, David Reznick and Larry Pack. They sang catches, or rounds, from the English Restoration period, and appeared throughout North America whilst recording an album.

In 1963, he relocated to Europe, where using his knowledge of languages, began overseeing the dubbing of English-language AIP films into Italian, French, and German. Since then, he has worked as sync-adapter and dubbing director of more than 500 films, and as a dubber his voice can be heard in more than 1000 films, providing the voice for numerous leading men as well as many villains in a number of Italian cult favorites such as The Whip and the Body (1963), Deep Red (1975), Beyond the Darkness (1979) and many others. He has also worked extensively dubbing films into Italian and French, often supplying foreign languages or accents. As a dubbing director he is known for his extensive work for the English-language versions of foreign – predominantly Italian – films. He also sync-adapted, acted in, and directed the dubbing of films shot in Turkish, Finnish, Greek, Danish, Hebrew, and Korean as well as the standard European cinema languages.

From the early 1980s, Rusoff also worked as an actor in film and television. He started out with supporting roles – often playing authority figures or religious characters such as priests, rabbis or monks. His earliest film roles were in Joe d'Amato's horror film Absurd (1981) and in Marco Ferreri's Tales of Ordinary Madness (1981), based on the works of Charles Bukowski, and Franco Zeffirelli's La Traviata (1983) alongside Plácido Domingo. He also acted together with his wife, Carolyn De Fonseca, in the Pia Zadora starring vehicle The Lonely Lady (1983), and he and De Fonseca played husband and wife, the parents of Mussolini's mistress Claretta Petacci in the TV miniseries Mussolini and I (1985), with Bob Hoskins in the title role.

Throughout the rest of the 1980s and 1990s, Rusoff acted in low-budget B-movies such as Catacombs (1988), where he plays a monk; Sinbad of the Seven Seas (1989) with Lou Ferrigno, where he plays the keeper of the torture chamber; and the Jean-Claude Van Damme flick Double Team (1997), where he plays a hacking-inclined Italian monk. However, he also had roles in many acclaimed films such as Martin Scorsese's The Last Temptation of Christ (1988), alongside Max von Sydow in the TV movie A Violent Life (1991), in which he played Pope Paul III, Tinto Brass' The Voyeur (1994) and, in a film about the life of Pope John XXIII, The Good Pope (2002), as a rabbi working with the future Pope Angelo Roncalli in his efforts to free a shipload of Jews in Istanbul and send them to Israel. Rusoff also played the Chief Elder in Mel Gibson's controversial Biblical epic The Passion of the Christ (2004) and Julius Caesar's Greek slave Strabo in the popular HBO series Rome (2005–2007).

== Personal life ==
Rusoff was married to his long-time colleague, voice actress Carolyn De Fonseca, until her death in 2009. He died in Rome, Italy, on September 28, 2013, more than a month after being hit by car.

== List of dubbing roles (incomplete) ==
Year	Title	Role	Actor
1963	The Whip and the Body	Christian Menliff	Tony Kendall
1965	Bloody Pit of Horror	Raul	Alberto Giordini
1967	Gamera vs. Gyaos	Shiro Tsutsumi	Kojiro Hongo
1967	Yongary, Monster from the Deep	Ilo	Oh Yeong-il
1967–1968	Johnny Sokko and His Flying Robot	Jerry Mano	Akio Ito
1968	The Battle of El Alamein	Lt. Giorgio Borri	Frederick Stafford
1968	Destroy All Monsters	Dr. Otani	Yoshio Tsuchiya
1968	The Great Silence	Outlaw	Guido Simoni
1969	The Red Tent	Snowblind Di Nobile Crewmember	Donatas Banionis
1969	Machine Gun McCain	Rocco	Mino Cuspisi
1969	Battle of the Last Panzer	Lt. Hunter	Stelvio Rosi
1969	Naked Violence	Marco	Gianfranco Pellegrini
1970	Shadow of Illusion	Seth	Antonio Cantafora
1970	When the Bell Tolls	Tego	Gino Turini
1970	And God Said to Cain	Gary Hamilton	Klaus Kinski
1971	The Bloodstained Butterfly	Police Inspector	Silvano Tranquilli
1971	The Cannibal Man	Marcos	Vicente Parra
1971	Four Pistols for Trinity	Quinn Paradine	Umberto Raho
1971	Slaughter Hotel	Dr. Francis Clay	Klaus Kinski
1971	The Strange Vice of Mrs. Wardh	George Corro	George Hilton
1972	The Case of the Bloody Iris	Andrea Barto	George Hilton
1972	Death Walks at Midnight	Gio Baldi	Simón Andreu
1972	Milano Calibro 9	Chino	Philippe Leroy
1972	The Red Queen Kills Seven Times	Police Inspector	Marino Masé
1972	Shadows Unseen	The Priest	Renato Romano
1972	Shadows Unseen	Sgt. Mortesi	Elio Zamuto
1973	Seven Deaths in the Cat's Eye	Dr. Franz	Anton Diffring
1973	The Violent Professionals	Vice-Commissioner Del Buono	Chris Avram
1974	Almost Human	Grandi's Assistant	Mario Piave
1974	Beyond the Door	Robert Barrett	Gabriele Lavia
1974	The Eerie Midnight Horror Show	Carlo	Gianrico Tondinelli
1974	Identikit	Police Inspector	Maurizio Bonuglia
1974	The Last Desperate Hours	Paolo Mancuso	Antonio Sabàto
1975	Deep Red	Superintendent Calcabrini	Eros Pagni
1975	Eyeball	Martinez	Raf Baldassarre
1975	Syndicate Sadists	Pino Scalia	Mario Piave
1976	Apache Woman	Tommy	Al Cliver
1976	The Big Racket	Sgt. Salvatore Velasci	Sal Borgese
1976	Black Emanuelle 2	Paul	Angelo Infanti
1976	Colt 38 Special Squad	Inspector Vanni	Marcel Bozzuffi
1976	Last Orgy of the Third Reich	Camp Doctor	Fulvio Ricciardi
1976	The Last Round	Rico Manzetti	Luc Merenda
1976	Live Like a Cop, Die Like a Man	Fred	Marc Porel
1976	My Father's Wife	Claudio	Cesare Barro
1976	Plot of Fear	Chief Inspector	Tom Skerritt
1976	SS Camp 5 – Women's Hell	Dr. Karl	?
1977	Death Hunt	Inspector Ettore Moretti	Al Cliver
1977	Fearless	Walter 'Wally' Spada	Maurizio Merli
1977	Suspiria	Police Inspector	?
1977	The Desert Tigers	Major Lexman	Richard Harrison
1977	The Cynic, the Rat and the Fist	Munition Expert	?
1977	Return of the 38 Gang	Commissioner Gino Varelli	Antonio Sabàto
1978	Blazing Flowers	Commissioner Morani	George Hilton
1978	Killer Nun	Dr. Patrick Roland	Joe Dallesandro
1978	Being Twenty	Inspector Zambo	Giorgio Bracardi
1978	The Uranium conspiracy	Renzo	Fabio Testi
1979	Beyond the Darkness	Frank Wyler	Kieran Canter
1979	Escape from Hell	Dr. Farrell	Anthony Steffen
1979	From Corleone to Brooklyn	Lt. Danova	Venantino Venantini
1979	Hotel Paradise	Juan Laredo	Anthony Steffen
1979	Terror Express	Mike	Venantino Venantini
1980	Anthropophagus	Andy	Saverio Vallone
1980	Cannibal Apocalypse	Dr. Phil Mendez	Ramiro Olivares
1980	Contamination	Dr. Hilton	Mike Morris
1980	Erotic Nights of the Living Dead	Larry O'Hara	George Eastman
1980	Hell of the Living Dead	Vincent	Selan Karay
1980	Inferno	John the butler	Leopoldo Mastelloni
1980	The Rebel	Nick Rossi	Maurizio Merli
1981	Burial Ground: The Nights of Terror	Mark	Gianluigi Chirizzi
1981	Piranha 2: The Spawning	Initial Victim	?
1981	The House by the Cemetery	Mr. Wheatley	Carlo De Mejo
1982	Nathalie	Stanley Warren	Roger Beach
1982	Panic	Captain Kirk	David Warbeck
1982	Pieces	Professor Arthur Brown	Jack Taylor
1982	The Sword of the Barbarians	Sangraal	Pietro Torrisi
1982	Violence in a Women's Prison	Chief Inspector	Jacques Stany
1983	The Ark of the Sun God	Prince Abdullah	Aytekin Akkaya
1983	Escape from the Bronx	Governor Biddle	?
1983	The Final Executioner	Alan Tanner	William Mang
1983	Hercules	Valcheus	Gianni Garko
1983	Rats: Night of Terror	Kurt	Ottaviano Dell'Acqua
1983	Rush	Rush	Conrad Nichols
1983	Throne of Fire	Siegfried	Pietro Torrisi
1983	Emanuelle Escapes from Hell	Crazy Boy Henderson	Gabriele Tinti
1984	Monster Dog	Vincent Raven	Alice Cooper
1984	Rage – Fuoco incrociato	Rage	Conrad Nicols
1984	Monster Shark	Dr. Davis Barker	Lawrence Morgant
1985	Jungle Raiders	Tiger	Protacio Dee
1985	Miami Golem	Craig Milford	David Warbeck
1986	Bridge to Hell	Pazilbo	Carlo Mucari
1986	Days of Hell	Captain Williamson	Conrad Nichols
1987	The Cross of Seven Jewels	Marco Sartori	Marco Antonio Andolfi
1987	Wartime	Captain Rosen	Peter Hooten
1988	After Death	David	Massimo Vanni
1988	Ratman	Fred	David Warbeck
1988	Touch of Death	Lester Parson	Brett Halsey
1988	Zombi 3	General Morton	Mike Monty
1989	Alien From the Deep	Bob	Daniel Bosch
1989	The House of Lost Souls	Massimo	Matteo Gazzolo
1989	The House of Witchcraft	Luke Palmer	Andy J. Forest
1995	The Strange Story of Olga O.	Paolo Roli	David Brandon
1996	Fatal Frames	Calzetta	Massimo Pittarello
2003	Cannibal World	Bob Manson	Claudio Morales
2003	Land of Death	Romero	Claudio Morales
2003	Snuff Trap	Peter	Carlo Mucari
2011	The Scarlet Worm	Print's Attorney	Offscreen

== Filmography ==
Year	Title	Role	Notes
1956	Runaway Daughters	Teenager in Crowd	
1981	Tales of Ordinary Madness	Priest	Uncredited
1981	Absurd	Dr. Kramer	
1983	The Lonely Lady	Preacher	
1988	Catacombs	Brother Brandt	
1988	The Last Temptation of Christ	Crowd Member	Voice
1988	Stradivari	2nd Dignitary	
1989	Sinbad of the Seven Seas	Torture Chamber Keeper	Uncredited
1989	La morte è di moda	Rizzo's Friend	Uncredited
1990	Una vita scellerata	Alessandro Farnese / Pope Alexander III	
1994	The Voyeur	The Parking Attendant	
1997	Double Team	Brother Ramulu	
1997	The Eighteenth Angel	Benedetti	
2004	The Passion of the Christ	Elder No. 7	
2004	Eternal	Italian Bookshop Owner	
2006	The Nativity Story	Old Shepherd	
2009	Christine Cristina	Frate Severino	
2011	The Scarlet Worm	Print's Attorney	Voice
