= Basehart =

Basehart is a surname. Notable people with the surname include:

- Jackie Basehart (1951–2015), American actor
- Richard Basehart (1914–1984), American actor, father of Jackie
