= American Love (disambiguation) =

American Love is a 2016 album by Jake Owen, and its title track.

American Love may also refer to:

- American Love (film), a 1931 French film
- An American Love, a 1994 Italian film
- American Love, a 2013 album by Bad Rabbits
- "American Love", a song by Haste the Day from Burning Bridges
- "American Love", a song by Jack's Mannequin from The Glass Passenger
- "American Love", a song by Rose Laurens
- "American Love", a song by Espen Lind (also known as Sway)
- "American Love", a song by Nothingface from Violence
- "American Love", a song by Smallpools from Lovetap!
