= Franco Garofalo (actor) =

Italian actor and writer (1946–2019)

- Born: 18 April 1946; Naples, Italy
- Died: 22 August 2019 (aged 73); Rome, Italy
- Years active: 1972–2019

Franco Garofalo (18 April 1946 – 22 August 2019), sometimes credited as "Frank Garfield", was an Italian character actor and writer. He is best-known for his role as Zantoro, an eccentric but good-intentioned commando soldier, in the 1980 zombie horror film Hell of the Living Dead, as well as for various roles in independent productions of Italian cinema in the 1970s and 1980s.

== Early life ==
Franco Garofalo was born in Naples, Italy in 1946. He was the son of an affluent lawyer in the 1950s postwar climate. He attended various schools and would perform amateur acting and poetry for fun. When Garofalo was six years old, his father was stricken with an unknown illness, which progressed until his death when Garofalo was 11 years old. Little is known about Garofalo's early life beyond this incident, although he did get married and had a daughter during the span of his acting career.

== Career ==
Garofalo's initial acting roles were in minor parts for cast extras and side characters, although by the late 1970s, he started receiving more important roles and varied character parts. This included numerous roles in Italian crime thriller films, such as that of Luca in La Bravata, and roles in Seagulls Fly Low and La banda Vallanzasca, all of which received attention in Roberto Curti's Italian Crime Filmography, establishing his rising prominence in 1970s Italian cinema. Garofalo became internationally-recognized after starring as Zantoro in Bruno Mattei's 1980 zombie horror film Hell of the Living Dead, a film which was later dubbed in English and released in North America and the United Kingdom. Hell of the Living Dead received a cult following, which later led to a featurette documentary called Bonded by Blood released on the Blu-ray disc edition of the film. Claudio Fragasso, who served as co-writer and co-director in Hell of the Living Dead, noted in Bonded by Blood that Franco Garofalo's portrayal of his character's eccentric and increasingly unstable nature was largely improvised by Garofalo himself, including scenes where Zantoro would deliberately provoke and walk into hordes of zombies for fun. Garofalo was popular with the rest of the cast, who found his madcap antics amusing. This led to a platonic friendship with co-actress Margit Evelyn Newton, who remembered him fondly as a nice man; Newton had played the film's lead female, a television reporter named Lia Rousseau.

Prior to the advent of internet film metadata banks, Garofalo was often unrecognized for his own roles, owing largely to his Italian name being replaced in credits with an Anglican variant. This included "Frank Garfield" (Hell of the Living Dead) and "Frank Garland" (Hercules).

In 2002, Garofalo worked on writing and directing his own project, a short film titled Schizofrenia di un attore (English: "Schizophrenia of an Actor"), which he had started in 1982 and completed in 2002. The completed film was uploaded to his official YouTube channel.

== Later life ==
Franco Garofalo suffered from severe physical and mental health issues for most of his post-1980s career and life, which he disclosed in media interviews. In a 2017 interview with Jay Creepy of Severed Cinema, Garofalo described his experiences with severe depression and living in the streets for several years, and stated that he eventually suffered from a heart attack and kidney failure. Garofalo noted during this interview that he was featured in a "Stracult" television interview, which was conducted in 2011; it later aired on television and was uploaded to YouTube.

== Death ==
Franco Garofalo died in Rome, Italy on August 22, 2019, from advanced-stage lung cancer. He was 73 years old. Blue Underground, the corporation that had released the Blu-ray double feature disc of Hell of the Living Dead and Rats: Night of Terror, released a statement on Facebook saying, "RIP Franco Garofalo. He was interviewed for our HELL OF THE LIVING DEAD release, and couldn't have been more pleasant. His performance in that film is of course completely unforgettable. We'll see you on the other side!"

== Filmography ==
Year	Title	Role
1972	Lo chiamavano Verità	Misery
1972	Canterbury proibito	Pilgrim
1973	Sex of the Witch	Tony the Butler
1973	Ingrid sulla strada	Man of Renato
1974	The Arena	Aemilius
1974	Eroi all'inferno	Pratt
1975	Un urlo dalle tenebre	Sabbath Leader
1976	Squadra antiscippo	Garba
1976	Colt 38 Special Squad	Gilbert Delange / Giampiero Manni
1977	A Year of School (TV Movie)	Wieselberg
1977	La banda Vallanzasca	Pino
1977	La bravata	Luca
1978	Seagulls Fly Low	Killer
1978	Eyes Behind the Stars	Peter Collins
1978	The Iron Commissioner	Bruno
1979	Ciao nì!	Scienziato Nero
1980	La vera storia della monaca di Monza	Don Paolo Arrigone / Priest
1980	Hell of the Living Dead	Zantoro
1981	The Other Hell	Boris
1982	The Scorpion with Two Tails	Gianni Andrucci
1983	Hercules	The Thief
1988	The Witches' Sabbath	Medico del '600
1988	Dags	Cheryl's Dad
2002	Schizofrenia di un attore	Various
2015	Help Me Have No Human Ways	Student (voice)
2020	Corona Zombies	Argento (posthumous role)

- Filmography excludes roles in television shows, except for made-for-TV films and short films.
