= The Iguana with the Tongue of Fire =

- Italian film poster
- Directed by: Riccardo Freda
- Screenplay by: Sandro Continenza; Riccardo Freda
- Story by: Sandro Continenza; Riccardo Freda
- Produced by: Ennio Nobili; Robert Dorfmann
- Starring: Luigi Pistilli; Dagmar Lassander
- Cinematography: Silvano Ippoliti
- Edited by: Riccardo Freda
- Music by: Stelvio Cipriani
- Production companies: Oceania Produzioni Internationali Cinematografica; Les Films Corona; Terra Filmkunst
- Distributed by: Euro International Films (Italy)
- Release date: 24 August 1971 (Italy)
- Running time: 94 minutes
- Countries: Italy; France; West Germany
- Language: Italian
- Box office: ₤169.405 million

The Iguana with the Tongue of Fire (Italian: L'iguana dalla lingua di fuoco)) is a 1971 giallo film. It was directed by Riccardo Freda, who was unhappy with the film and had his name replaced with the pseudonym "Willy Pareto".

== Cast ==
- Luigi Pistilli as Detective John Norton
- Dagmar Lassander as Helen Sobiesky
- Anton Diffring as Ambassador Sobieski
- Arthur O'Sullivan as Inspector Lawrence
- Werner Pochath as Marc Sobiesky
- Dominique Boschero as Ambassador's Mistress
- Valentina Cortese as Mrs. Sobiesky

== Production ==
Prior to the release of Dario Argento's film The Bird with the Crystal Plumage, giallo films were not popular among Italian film audiences. Following the release of Bird, a wave of giallos were released with animal's names in their title. This led Riccardo Freda to follow suit and attempt a film in the genre.

The film's opening credits state it is based on the novel A Room Without a Door, by Richard Mann. Italian film historian Roberto Curti said that the novel was an invention of the filmmakers. The screenplay of the film was written by Sandro Continenza and Freda, while other credited writers André Tranché and Gunther Ebert were credited solely for co-production reasons.

Riccardo Freda was not proud of the film and was unhappy with the cast. He later said that he had initially wanted "Roger Moore in the lead, but at the last minute I got Luigi Pistilli."

L'iguana dalla lingua di fuoco was filmed in Ireland.

== Release ==
L'iguana dalla lingua di fuoco was distributed theatrically in Italy by Euro International Films on 24 August 1971. It grossed a total of 169,405,000 Italian lire domestically. Curti described this box office performance as "rather poor", noting that other films in the genre from that year such as The Cat o' Nine Tails grossed 2.4 billion while The Night Evelyn Came Out of the Grave grossed 450 million.

A photonovel version of the film was released in the adults-only magazine Cinesex in January 1972.

The film was released on Blu-Ray in 2019 in both an Italian and English dubbed version.

== Critical reception ==
From retrospective reviews, Robert Firsching of AllMovie wrote that the "Stylish director Riccardo Freda gave Italy some of its greatest horror films. This gory but preposterous giallo thriller is not one of them", calling it "one of a great director's most blatant misfires." Louis Paul, author of Italian Horror Film Directors described the film as a "nasty and vicious entry in the giallo thriller genre, complete with the hindrance of an unlikable cast of villains and suspects."
