= Lady of the Night (1986 film) =

- Italian theatrical release poster
- Directed by: Piero Schivazappa
- Written by: Piero Schivazappa; Galliano Juso
- Produced by: Giovanni Bertolucci
- Starring: Serena Grandi
- Cinematography: Giuseppe Ruzzolini
- Music by: Guido & Maurizio De Angelis
- Distributed by: Variety Distribution
- Release date: 1986
- Country: Italy
- Language: Italian

Lady of the Night (Italian: La signora della notte, also known as Angelina and Angelina: Lady of the Night) is a 1986 Italian erotic romantic drama film written and directed by Piero Schivazappa.

== Plot ==
Simona and Marco live in a pleasant apartment in the centre of Rome and drive a large Lancia but, after three years of marriage, Simona feels unfulfilled. Remembering the passion when they first met, and wondering whether this could now be found with a stranger, she lets herself be seduced in the hallway of their building and later in a public toilet.

When a couple come to dinner and at the end all four drive to the seaside, she is having sex with the other man when Marco finds them. After he beats the man unconscious and then beats Simona, she leaves him to stay with a friend from her aerobics class.

When two attempts at reconciliation fail, Simona decides that she needs a baby and has her IUD removed. A few days later, to her horror, she is raped in her friend's apartment by an intruder whose face she never sees. On the floor afterwards, she finds a medallion that had fallen from his neck in the struggle: it is one she gave to Marco, engraved with his name. Taking it back to him, she finds that the passion has returned to their marriage.

== Cast ==
- Serena Grandi as Simona
- Fabio Sartor as Marco
- Francesca Topi as Giuliana
- Alberto Di Stasio as Ettore
- Tiberio Mitri as The Barman

== See also ==
- List of Italian films of 1986
