= Viuuulentemente mia =

1982 Italian crime comedy film

- Theatrical release poster by Enzo Sciotti
- Directed by: Carlo Vanzina
- Written by: Cesare Frugoni; Carlo Vanzina; Enrico Vanzina
- Story by: Mario Amendola; Bruno Corbucci
- Starring: Diego Abatantuono; Laura Antonelli
- Cinematography: Alberto Spagnoli
- Edited by: Raimondo Crociani
- Music by: Armando Trovajoli
- Release date: 29 October 1982
- Running time: 90 minutes
- Country: Italy
- Language: Italian

Viuuulentemente mia ("Mine with violence") is a 1982 Italian crime comedy film written and directed by Carlo Vanzina.

== Cast ==
- Diego Abatantuono as Achille Cotone
- Laura Antonelli as Anna Tassotti Maloni
- Christian De Sica as Juan Lopez y Aragona de Figeroa
- Guido Nicheli as Rodolfo
- Jackie Basehart as Frank Lovejoy
- Diego Cappuccio as Achille's Colleague
- Sandro Ghiani as The Sardinian Policeman
- Roberto Della Casa as Italian Commissioner
- Massimo Sarchielli as Spanish Commissioner
- Guido Cerniglia as Lawyer Pardini

== See also ==
- List of Italian films of 1982
