= Reflections in Black =

- Directed by: Tano Cimarosa
- Written by: Adriano Bolzoni; Luigi Latini de Marchi
- Starring: John Richardson; Dagmar Lassander; Ninetto Davoli; Magda Konopka; Giacomo Rossi Stuart; Tano Cimarosa
- Cinematography: Marcello Masciocchi
- Music by: Carlo Savina
- Release date: 1975
- Running time: 90 minutes
- Language: Italian

Reflections in Black (Italian: Il vizio ha le calze nere / Vice Wears Black Hose) is a 1975 Italian giallo film directed by the actor Tano Cimarosa, here at his directorial debut.

== Plot ==
In San Benedetto del Tronto, a mysterious murderer kills young and beautiful women. The murderer, as glimpsed from some eyewitnesses, has the look of a young woman dressed in black.

== Cast ==
- John Richardson as Inspector Lavina
- Magda Konopka as Countess Orselmo
- Dagmar Lassander as Leonora Anselmi
- Ninetto Davoli as Marco
- Giacomo Rossi Stuart as Mr. Anselmi
- Dada Gallotti as Valeria
- Daniela Giordano as Concetta
- Ursula Davis as Anna
- Tano Cimarosa as Sergeant Pantò
