= Roberto Girometti =

Italian film director and cinematographer

- Born: 4 May 1939 (age 86); Rome, Italy
- Occupation(s): Film director Cinematographer

Roberto Girometti is an Italian film director and cinematographer.

Girometti is known for such films as The Iron Hand of the Mafia, Ratman and The Incinerator.
