= Piero Schivazappa =

Italian film and television director and screenwriter (1935–2017)

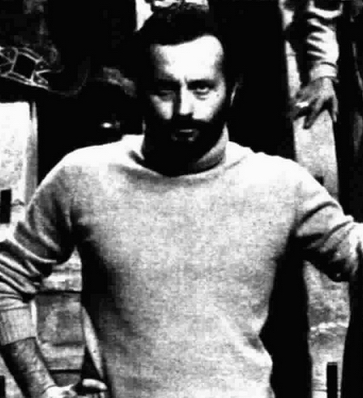
- Schivazappa in Radiocorriere magazine, 1974.
- Born: 14 April 1935; Colorno, Kingdom of Italy
- Died: 14 December 2017 (aged 82); Rome, Italy
- Occupations: Film director, television director, screenwriter
- Years active: 1960–1994
- Spouse: Scilla Gabel (m. 1968)
- Children: 1

Piero Schivazappa (14 April 1935 – 14 December 2017) was an Italian film and television director and screenwriter.

== Life and career ==
Born in Colorno, Schivazappa entered the film industry in 1959 as an assistant director, collaborating with Valerio Zurlini, Mario Monicelli and Carlo Lizzani, among others. In 1963, he started collaborating with RAI for news reports and documentaries.

Schivazappa made his feature film debut in 1969, with the controversial BDSM-themed The Laughing Woman, which at the time had many problems with censorship. Following the success of his 1973 miniseries Vino e pane, in the following years he focused on television films and TV-series.

== Personal life and death ==
Schivazappa was married to actress Scilla Gabel. He died in Rome on 14 December 2017, at the age of 82.

== Selected filmography ==
- L'Odissea (TV, 1968)
- The Laughing Woman (1969)
- Una sera c'incontrammo (1975)
- Dov'è Anna? (TV, 1976)
- Lady of the Night (1986)
- An American Love (TV, 1994)
