= The Iron Hand of the Mafia =

- Directed by: Roberto Girometti
- Screenplay by: Roberto Girometti; Pelio Quaglia
- Story by: Roberto Girometti; Pelio Quaglia
- Produced by: Nino Vendetti
- Starring: Jackie Basehart; Malisa Longo; Raffaele Fortunato
- Cinematography: Roberto Girometti
- Edited by: Luciano Anconetani
- Music by: Massimo Camilletti
- Production company: Cabaret Film
- Distributed by: Samanda
- Release date: November 28, 1980 (Italy)
- Running time: 79 minutes
- Country: Italy

The Iron Hand of the Mafia (Italian: Mafia, una legge che non perdona) is a 1980 Italian film directed by Roberto Girometti.

== Plot ==
The heirs of the old mafia give rise to a bloody struggle to secure the monopoly on organized crime.

== Cast ==
- Gordon Mitchell as Don Nicola
- Raffaele Fortunato as Don Raffaele Nocera
- Malisa Longo as Angela
- Jackie Basehart as Tony
- Fabrizio Marani as Michele Nocera
- Gianni Diana as Giorgio
- Tina Trapassi as Maria
- Antonella Luardi as Denise
- Margie Newton as Teresa (credited as Margi Newton)
- Franco Angrisano as "Sic-Sic"
- Antonio Angrisano as Coppola's Son
- Bruno Venturini as Himself

== Style ==
Despite the films title, there is no mafia in the film The Iron Hand of the Mafia. The film is actually a Sceneggiata film.

== Production ==
Actress Mafia Margit Evelyn Newton choreographed a fight scene with co-star Malisa Longo along with the director and Longo.

== Release ==
The Iron Hand of the Mafia was released on November 28, 1980, where it was distributed by Samanda.

== Reception ==
In his book Italian Crime Filmography, 1968-1980, Roberto Curti described the film as "third grade material" with poor direction, grating comic relief from Angrisano and Shiavone and the films "non-existent pacing."

== Notes ==
=== References ===
- Curti, Roberto (2013). Italian Crime Filmography, 1968-1980. McFarland. ISBN 978-0786469765.
