= Tano Cimarosa =

Italian actor, screenwriter and film director

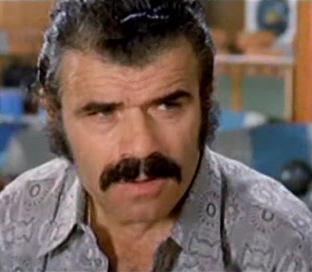
- Cimarosa in Gang War in Milan (1973)
- Born: 1 January 1922; Messina, Kingdom of Italy
- Died: 24 May 2008 (aged 86); Messina, Italy
- Occupations: Actor, film director

Tano Cimarosa, (real name Gaetano Cisco; 1 January 1922 – 24 May 2008) was an Italian actor, screenwriter and film director. He participated in more than fifty movies.

He played the "Blacksmith" in the Oscar-winning film Cinema Paradiso from 1988. He is known to giallo film fans for directing Reflections in Black in 1975.

== Selected filmography ==
- The Eye of the Needle (1962) as Umberto
- Mad Sea (1963)
- The Two Parachutists (1965) as Garcia's aide
- Due mafiosi contro Al Capone (1966) as Gangster
- Our Husbands (1966) as The Sicilian Neighbour of Attilia (segment "Il marito di Attilia") (uncredited)
- Il lungo, il corto, il gatto (1967) as Il metronotte
- The Day of the Owl (1968) as Zecchinetta
- May God Forgive You... But I Won't (1968) as Chico
- Suicide Commandos (1968) as Calleya
- Be Sick... It's Free (1968) as Salvatore Laganà-Father of 9 children
- La morte sull'alta collina (1969) as General Valiente
- Bootleggers (1969) as Mancho
- The Tough and the Mighty (1969) as Cartana
- Police Chief Pepe (1969) as Agente Cariddi
- The Most Beautiful Wife (1970) as Gaetano Cimarosa
- A Sword for Brando (1970) as Greedy friar
- Crepa padrone, crepa tranquillo (1970)
- Between Miracles (1971) asZi' Checco
- La Poudre d'escampette (1971) as Un soldat italien sur la plage
- In Prison Awaiting Trial (1971) as Un secondino
- A Girl in Australia (1971) as Emigrante italiano
- Stanza 17–17 palazzo delle tasse, ufficio imposte (1971) as Police Commissioner
- Delirio caldo (1972) as John 'Crocchetta' Lacey
- Così sia (1972) as Chaco, Gang Boss
- Italian Graffiti (1973) as Puddu Campolia
- Riti, magie nere e segrete orge nel trecento... (1973) as scenes deleted
- Gang War in Milan (1973) as Nino Balsamo
- Oremus, alleluia e così sia (1973) as Chaco
- Bread and Chocolate (1974) as Gigi
- Unbelievable Adventures of Italians in Russia (1974) as Rosario Agrò
- Pasqualino Cammarata, Frigate Captain (1974) as Patanò
- How to Kill a Judge (1975) as Tano Barra, l'assistente di parcheggio
- L'ammazzatina (1975) as Pasqualino Mosco
- Il fidanzamento (1975) as Man in the movie (uncredited)
- Reflections in Black (1975) as Sgt. Pantò
- The Exorcist: Italian Style (1975) as Turi Randazzo
- Free Hand for a Tough Cop (1976) as Cravatta
- L'Italia in pigiama (1977) as Il padre incestuoso
- Death Hunt (1977) as Tano
- A Man on His Knees (1979) as Sebastiano Colicchia
- Café Express (1980) as Panepino, maresciallo Polfer
- Uomini di parola (1981) as Gaetano Frasca
- Sfrattato cerca casa equo canone (1983) as Massimo
- Sicilian Connection (1987) as Don Michele
- Faida (1988)
- Cinema Paradiso (1988) as Blacksmith
- The Dark Sun (1990)
- Boys on the Outside (1990) as Capo-cantiere
- C'è posto per tutti (1990)
- The Saracen Woman (La Sarrasine) (1992) as Pasquale Lopinto
- La discesa di Aclà a Floristella (1992)
- Anni 90: Parte II (1993) as Mimì Cantalamessa
- A Pure Formality (1994) as Servant
- Italia Village (1994)
- The Star Maker (1995) as Grandpa Bordonaro
- Spot (1999)
- Una milanese a Roma (2001)
- Two Friends (2002) as Pensionato
- L'anno mille (2008) as Custode (final film role)

=== As director ===
- Reflections in Black (1975) or Vice Wears Black Hose
- Death Hunt (1977, also writer)

== Bibliography ==
- Luigia Miniucchi, Il mondo di Tano Cimarosa. 50 anni di cinema italiano, By Bess Edizioni, 2006. 160 pages.
