= Cecile Bombeek =

Belgian serial killer (1933–2019)

Cecile Bombeke
- Born: Marie-Godfrieda Cecilia Bombeke; 1933; Belgium
- Died: 2019 (aged 86); Sint-Jozef, Wetteren
- Other name: Sister Godfrida

Details
- Victims: 3-30+
- Span of crimes: 1976–1977
- Country: Belgium
- Date apprehended: 1978

Marie-Godfrieda Cecilia Bombeke, also known as Cecile Bombeek or Sister Godfrida (1933–2019) was a Belgian nun and nurse who allegedly killed more than 30 people between 1976 and 1977. She died in 2019 in Sint-Jozef, Wetteren. She was 86 years old.

== Background and crimes ==
Cecile Bombeek was born in the small Belgian village of Overmere. At fifteen, she expressed a desire to become a nun and entered the Apostolic Congregation of Holy Joseph nearby Wetteren in Flanders. She lived in its cloister and spent much of her subsequent life working within the town's Old People's Home. She was now Sister Godfrida and soon gained a reputation for piety, hard work, and leadership. Sister Godfrida rose in the ranks of the order until she was appointed Mother Superior. She represented her order for many years within the hospital and wider community. In the mid-seventies, she served as geriatrics manager within a Belgian public hospital in Wetteren.

Bombeek's aberrant behaviour began after an operation to excise a brain tumor. Although the operation was outwardly a success, her colleagues noticed that strange behaviour had started shortly after she had recovered from her surgery. When they later investigated her case, local police consulted neurological specialists, who advised them that in some cases, personalities can shift after such an operation. After her surgery, Bombeek had been given morphine to ease her pain. She became addicted and became fixated on obtaining money for illicit supplies of the drug. In addition, she made lesbian overtures to other nuns.

After some time in this role, Bombeek was officially accused of killing three patients, due to allegations that each was too noisy at night. However, she was suspected of murdering more than 30 of that facility's elderly residents from 1976 to 1977. As well as these alleged homicides, she was also accused of stealing a large sum of money from her victims, as well as suspected repeated acts of torture, ripping catheters from patients and other abusive behaviour. Time magazine reported that Bombeek was finally apprehended through the efforts of fellow nuns who worked within the 38-bed geriatric ward and who recorded a string of mysterious deaths and other irregularities.

On 16 January 1978, three Apostolic Congregation nuns – Sister Pieta, Sister Franziska, and Sister Godive – entered the Wetteren Police Station with allegations of aberrant conduct by Sister Godfrida, the geriatrics manager. The sisters stated that they had observed Godfrida drinking to excess and provided evidence that she also frequently used morphine and cocaine. Furthermore, she also made frequent journeys to Ghent, where she dined in sumptuous restaurants and drank premium vintage wine. The three nuns also documented instances of abusive corporal punishment of their sisters within the Apostolic Congregation convent.

More seriously than this, the three nuns disclosed that Bombeek had murdered Maria van der Gunst (87), an elderly woman who suffered from diabetes and was killed through an insulin overdose, which induced a severe hypoglycemia attack. Once she had killed Mrs. Van Der Gunst, Bombeek had used her money and jewelry to finance her expensive expeditions to Ghent. While an autopsy did not reveal significantly elevated levels of insulin in Mrs. Van Der Gunst's body, Bombeek confessed to Van Der Gunst's murder. She had also killed Pieter Diggmann, 82, and Leon Maihofer, 78, also diabetics, with similar insulin overdoses, in 1977.

== Aftermath ==
Bombeek was found incapable of facing trial due to insanity. She was committed to a psychiatric institution.

As a consequence of her actions, Bombeek attained some level of notoriety. A thinly disguised account of her misdeeds was filmed as the Italian nunsploitation film Suor Omicidi/Killer Nun. The publicity for the film described "A demented nun sliding through morphine addiction into madness, whilst presiding over a regime of lesbianism, torture and death. Sister Gertrude is the head nurse/nun in a general hospital, whose increasingly psychotic behavior endangers the staff and patients around her."

== Death ==
Bombeek died aged 86 in 2019 at a care centre in Sint-Jozef, Wetteren, near Ghent.
