= The Laughing Woman (film) =

1969 Italian film directed by Piero Schivazappa

- Italian theatrical poster
- Directed by: Piero Schivazappa
- Written by: Piero Schivazappa
- Produced by: Giuseppe Zaccariello
- Starring: Philippe Leroy; Dagmar Lassander
- Cinematography: Sante Achilli
- Edited by: Carlo Reali
- Music by: Stelvio Cipriani
- Production company: Cemo Film
- Distributed by: Cemo Film
- Release date: 4 December 1969
- Running time: 90 minutes
- Country: Italy
- Language: Italian

The Laughing Woman (Latin: Femina ridens), also known as The Frightened Woman, is a 1969 Italian erotic thriller film directed by Piero Schivazappa.

== Plot ==
Young journalist Maria meets wealthy philanthropist Dr. Sayer while writing a piece on male sterilization, for which she requires more research material. Their interview quickly turns into a heated debate when Maria speaks positively of male sterilization, while Sayer is staunchly against it. Unbeknownst to Maria, Sayer is a sadist who spends his weekends acting out his depraved fantasies with prostitutes. When his usual prostitute becomes unavailable at the last minute, Sayer decides to replace her with Maria when she revisits him to collect additional information. He drugs her and transports her to a secluded, luxurious villa just outside of Rome, which he uses as a chamber for his weekly endeavors.

Sayer subjects Maria to a myriad of torturous activities, including cutting her hair, forcing her to have sex with a mannequin replica of himself, and showing her photographs and audio recordings of his previous victims. Maria alternates between begging Sayer to release her and demanding that he kill her; she soon begins to exert psychological power over him as she taunts him by implying he is too much of a coward to go through with her murder. She eventually attempts suicide by overdosing on painkillers. A distraught Sayer desperately attempts to revive her, admitting that he has never actually killed anyone and that the photos and recordings he had shown her were staged with the help of professional actors; when his planned appointment fell through, he spontaneously decided to abduct Maria in the hopes that he would finally realize his fantasy of killing a woman via her, though he now finds himself unable to do so as he has fallen in love with her. Maria awakens, tenderly touching Sayer before kissing him.

Having developed a fondness for Maria, Sayer shares a shower with her, during which Maria deliberately burns him with scalding hot water. He then drives her to an open field. After sharing a gleeful day out together, Sayer reveals that when he was a child, he witnessed two scorpions mating, after which the female killed the male; this experience led to his current attitude toward women and why he has remained a virgin his entire life, as he subconsciously believed any women he had sex with would subsequently kill him.

Sayer takes Maria home, where the two have sex for the first time in his pool. As he climaxes, Sayer suffers a heart attack, then slips beneath the water and drowns. Maria removes the short haircut Sayer gave her - revealed to be a wig - collects her belongings, and leaves. Outside, she is picked up by her friend. It is revealed that Maria is an assassin hired to kill Sayer, and that her plan all along was to exhaust him through psychological reversal to the point of cardiac arrest. At home, Maria's butler delivers to her the photographs she took during her excursion with Sayer.

== Cast ==
- Philippe Leroy: Doctor Sayer
- Dagmar Lassander: Mary
- Lorenza Guerrieri: Gida
- Varo Soleri: Administrator
- Maria Cumani Quasimodo: Sayer's Secretary
- Mirella Pamphili: Streetwalker

== Soundtrack ==
Femina Ridens

Soundtrack album by Stelvio Cipriani
- Released: 1969
- Genres: Jazz; funk; psychedelia
- Label: CAM

The soundtrack to the film was composed by Stelvio Cipriani and released in 1969.

=== Track listing ===
All tracks are written by Stelvio Cipriani.

Side A
No.	Title	Length
1.	"Week-End with Mary"	2:02
2.	"Love Symbol"	2:20
3.	"Hot Skin" (Vocals by Edda Dell'Orso.)	2:46
4.	"Chorus and Brass “Fugato”" (Vocals by Edda Dell'Orso. Choir by I Cantori Moderni di Alessandroni.)	2:18
5.	"Rendez-Vous in the Castle"	1:51
6.	"Sophisticated Shake" (Vocals by Edda Dell'Orso.)	3:43

All tracks are written by Stelvio Cipriani.

Side B
No.	Title	Length
1.	"“Femina Ridens” Song" (Choir by I Cantori Moderni di Alessandroni. Vocals by Olympia.)	3:23
2.	"Mary's Theme"	2:08
3.	"The Shower" (Vocals by Edda Dell'Orso. Choir by I Cantori Moderni di Alessandroni.)	2:44
4.	"The Run in the Alley"	2:48
5.	"Fight of Love" (Choir by I Cantori Moderni di Alessandroni.)	3:21
6.	"Femina Ridens"	1:48

== Release ==
English-language prints have badly faded, so the theater is screening an 85-minute digital English-language version followed by the first three 35mm reels (about 60 minutes) of the Italian version (without subtitles), allowing the viewer to "bathe in the vivid colors and intense production design."
