= The Scarlet Worm =

2011 film

- Theatrical release poster
- Directed by: Michael Fredianelli
- Written by: David Lambert
- Produced by: Michael Fredianelli; David Lambert
- Starring: Aaron Stielstra; Dan van Husen; Montgomery Ford; Brett Halsey
- Cinematography: Michael A. Martinez
- Edited by: Michael Fredianelli
- Music by: Aaron Stielstra
- Production company: Wild Dogs Productions
- Distributed by: Unearthed Films
- Release date: January 7, 2011 (Riot Cinema Film Festival)
- Running time: 93 minutes
- Country: United States
- Language: English

The Scarlet Worm is a 2011 American Revisionist Western film directed by Michael Fredianelli. The film was first released on January 7, 2011 at the Riot Cinema Film Festival. It stars Aaron Stielstra as a young mercenary who is sent to assassinate a cruel brothel owner. Funding for The Scarlet Worm was partially accomplished through a successful Kickstarter campaign.

== Plot ==
Print Harris works as a bounty hunter in early 1900s America. He has a flair for conducting his killings in a theatrical or "poetic" fashion to give his profession more meaning and legitimacy. A wealthy ranch owner Mr. Paul hires Print to eliminate a Dutch immigrant brothel owner Heinrich Kley who allegedly aborts the unborn children of his prostitutes, as well as to train a young ranch hand named Lee in the art of killing. Print decides to use Lee to infiltrate Kley's business and work for Kley as protection, purposefully luring a posse of cowboys into the brothel in order to murder them, and show off his usefulness. Kley immediately enlists Print to cover a wide variety of duties while entrusting him with his unique philosophy regarding business, religion, and the necessity of prostitution. Matters become complicated when Lee falls in love with one of Kley's prostitutes and informs her of the plan to murder him.

== Cast ==
- Aaron Stielstra as Print
- Dan Van Husen as Heinrich Kley
- Brett Halsey as Mr. Paul
- Kevin Giffin as Hank
- Derek Hertig as Lee
- Eric Zaldivar as Gus
- Rita Rey as Annabelle
- Mike Malloy as Mathis Reed, Love Cowboy
- David Lambert as William Hardtmuth, Cattle Rustler
- Robert Amstler as The Rifleman
- Michael Forest as Judge Hanchett
- Ted Rusoff as Print's Attorney
- Domiziano Arcangeli as Love Cowboy Leader

== Release ==
=== Home media ===
The film was released on DVD and Blu-ray on April 24, 2012 by Unearthed.

== Reception ==
Bill Gibron from DVD Talk wrote, "While a bit long-winded in the exposition department and in need of a few dollars more, production-wise, The Scarlet Worm is still an intelligent and entertaining fringe experience." Adrian Halen of HorrorNews.net praised the film's direction, script, and Stielstra's performance, calling it "a shining achievement".
