= The Eighteenth Angel =

- Movie Poster
- Directed by: William Bindley
- Written by: David Seltzer
- Produced by: Douglas Curtis; William Hart
- Starring: Christopher McDonald; Maximilian Schell; Rachael Leigh Cook; Stanley Tucci; Wendy Crewson
- Cinematography: Thomas E. Ackerman
- Edited by: William Hoy
- Music by: Jeff Eden Fair; Starr Parodi
- Distributed by: Rysher Entertainment
- Release dates: December 6, 1997 (Japan); October 6, 1998 (USA)
- Running time: 95 minutes
- Country: United States
- Language: English

The Eighteenth Angel is a 1997 American horror-thriller film, starring Christopher McDonald, Rachael Leigh Cook, Stanley Tucci, Wendy Crewson and Maximilian Schell. It was directed by William Bindley and written by David Seltzer.

== Plot ==
An ancient Etruscan prophecy claims that the return of Satan will be precipitated by the arrival of eighteen physically perfect beings. To enable the prophecy to come to fruition, a secret sect of monks joins an obsessed geneticist to create the perfect specimens artificially.

Music scholar Hugh Stanton lives in America with his wife Norah and their teenage daughter Lucy. Lucy's good looks are beginning to attract attention and she dreams of becoming a professional model but Norah is opposed to this.

Norah dies in an unexplained fall from the roof of a tall building, seemingly a suicide, after a brief meeting with a mysterious Etruscan priest, Father Simeon. In the aftermath of her death, Hugh receives an invitation to visit a Roman church which allegedly contains "the world's oldest church organ". He and Lucy move to Italy, where they settle down in the former Etruscan areas north of Rome.

With little to do while Hugh is at work, Lucy begins to explore her surroundings, in particular an old monastery, despite warnings from locals. Scientist Benedetti, who was fired after performing unethical experiments on corpses, now works in the old building. As it transpires, he has been hired by the Etruscan priest who, it is insinuated, may have arranged the death of Norah, in order to trick Hugh and Lucy into visiting the ancient land of the Etruscans.

In the old building, seventeen young girls are clinically brain dead, but kept alive by Benedetti. Benedetti, unaware of his employer Father Simeon’s true intentions, is just glad to be able to continue his questionable experiments regardless. According to the Etruscan prophecy, the number of eighteen special girls are required for it to be fulfilled. Lucy could be the eighteenth,

== Cast ==
- Christopher McDonald as Hugh Stanton
- Rachael Leigh Cook as Lucy Stanton
- Stanley Tucci as Todd Stanton
- Wendy Crewson as Norah Stanton
- Maximilian Schell as Father Simeon
- Cosimo Fusco as Florian
- Venantino Venantini as Clockmaker
- Ted Rusoff as Benedetti
- Orso Maria Guerrini as Paolo Pagano
- Francesca De Sapio as Gabriella
- Enrica Maria Modugno as Maria Elena
- Urbano Barberini as Monk
- Jim McMullan as Priest
- Marino Masè as Doctor

== Release ==
The film was produced and released by Rysher Entertainment, which went defunct in 1999. Their library is now owned by Paramount Global.

On August 19, 1998, the film received a Japanese LaserDisc release by Pony Canyon. In some areas, The Eighteenth Angel was distributed on home media by 20th Century Fox Home Entertainment.

== Reception ==
Nathan Rabin of The A.V. Club was critical of film writing that the "mixture of the Satanic and the mundane results in a number of conceits and juxtapositions generally more silly than terrifying" and that it fails "to create the atmosphere of Old Testament dread that the material so desperately needs."
