= The Incinerator =

- Directed by: Pier Francesco Boscaro dagli Ambrosi
- Screenplay by: Pier Francesco Boscaro dagli Ambrosi
- Starring: Flavio Bucci; Ida Di Benedetto; Alexandra Delli Colli; Pietro Francescato
- Cinematography: Roberto Girometti
- Release date: 1984
- Running time: 90 minutes
- Country: Italy
- Language: Italian

The Incinerator (Italian: L'inceneritore) is a 1984 Italian horror comedy film directed by Pier Francesco Boscaro dagli Ambrosi.

The film features music composed and recorded by Richard Benson, who also has a small role as the leader of a street gang.

== Plot ==
A demented hunchback experiments on lab animals, a countess and her two bodyguards, and a hooker. His victims are killed, cut up, put in garbage bags, picked up by city garbage trucks, and burnt in the municipal incinerator.
