= Seagulls Fly Low =

- Directed by: Giorgio Cristallini
- Written by: Giorgio Cristallini; Odoardo Fiory
- Starring: Maurizio Merli; Nathalie Delon
- Cinematography: Gino Santini
- Music by: Roberto Pregadio; Paola & Carlo Cristallini
- Release date: December 9, 1977
- Country: Italy
- Language: Italian

Seagulls Fly Low (Italian: I gabbiani volano basso) is a 1977 Italian crime film written and directed by Giorgio Cristallini and starring Maurizio Merli, Nathalie Delon, and Mel Ferrer. It was shot between Rome, Civitavecchia, and Ponza.

== Plot ==
A Vietnam War veteran is blackmailed into carrying out an assassination for a corrupt businessman.

== Cast ==
- Maurizio Merli as Jeff Jacobson / Albert Morgan
- Nathalie Delon as Isabelle Michereau
- Mel Ferrer as Roberto Micheli
- Dagmar Lassander as Amparo
- Andrea Esterhazy as Calvi
- Franco Garofalo as Killer
