= The Voyeur (1994 film) =

- Theatrical release poster
- Directed by: Tinto Brass
- Screenplay by: Tinto Brass
- Based on: L'uomo che guarda by Alberto Moravia
- Produced by: Marco Poccioni; Marco Valsania
- Starring: Katarzyna Kozaczyk; Francesco Casale
- Cinematography: Massimo Di Venanzo
- Edited by: Tinto Brass
- Music by: Riz Ortolani
- Distributed by: DARC
- Release date: 27 January 1994
- Running time: 97 minutes
- Country: Italy
- Language: Italian
- Box office: $1.9 million (Italy)

The Voyeur (Italian: L'uomo che guarda, lit. 'The Man Who Looks') is a 1994 Italian erotic drama film written and directed by Tinto Brass in a free adaptation of Alberto Moravia's eponymous 1985 novel. It tells the story of an academic who in his interactions with other people is fated to watch and not to act, an approach that does not lead him to success with women.

== Plot ==
In Rome, Dodo is a university lecturer teaching French literature. He lives with his bedridden father Alberto, whose nurse Fausta attends to his medical and sexual needs. Withdrawn, Dodo is unmoved by Fausta's provocative behaviour and repelled by his father's rampant sexuality. He had been particularly close to his now-dead mother, who not only catered to her husband's needs but also had to share him with countless other women. His chief preoccupation, however, is his beautiful and sexually confident wife Silvia, who has disappeared with another man.

After a class, an African student, Pascasie, invites Dodo to her flat, where she strips and asks him to photograph her. When her flatmate returns, she initially objects to the presence of a strange man, but the two girls begin making love. As usual, Dodo remains an observer rather than a participant and leaves them alone. He increasingly fantasises about Silvia and about his parents' sexual relationship. One night, he sees a mysterious woman in his father's bedroom. The following morning, Fausta suggests that she was Silvia, noting that Silvia still has a key to the apartment. Soon afterwards, Silvia unexpectedly announces that she wants to return.

== Cast ==
- Katarina Vasilissa as Silvia
- Francesco Casale as Dodo
- Cristina Garavaglia as Fausta
- Raffaella Offidani as Pascasie
- Antonio Salines as Medical Attendant
- Martine Brochard as The Contessa
- Franco Branciaroli as Alberto
- Ted Rusoff as The Parking Attendant
- Tinto Brass (uncredited)
