= The Bronx Executioner =

- Directed by: Vanio Amici
- Written by: Vanio Amici; Piero Regnoli
- Starring: Gabriele Gori; Margit Evelyn Newton; Chuck Valenti; Woody Strode
- Distributed by: Cannon Films
- Release date: 1989
- Running time: 92 minutes
- Country: Italy
- Language: Italian

The Bronx Executioner is the English title of the Italian cyborg film, Il Giustiziere del Bronx, released in 1989.

== Plot ==
In the post-apocalyptic Bronx, warring races of evil androids and humanoids battle each other for supremacy.

== Cast ==
- Gabriele Gori as James
- Margie Newton as Margie
- Chuck Valenti as Shark
- Rod Robinson
- Bernard Lee
- Frank Davis
- Alex Vitale as Dakar
- Woody Strode as Sheriff Warren (archive footage)
- Cinzia Bonfantini (archive footage)
- Stefano Davanzati (archive footage)
- Luca Giordano (archive footage)
- Tommaso Mesto (archive footage)
- Renato Miracco (archive footage)
- Maria Romano (archive footage)

== Trivia ==
A certain amount of footage from the 1984 film The Final Executioner was used in this film. Woody Strode's footage as the character Sam from The Final Executioner is re-used here and his character is now Warren. Margit Evelyn Newton was the only actor from the first film to have new scenes shot in the second.

== Reception ==
Kim Newman found the film to be ghastly, finding it an inferior remake of the Final Executioner. Likewise, Creature Feature gave the movie 1 out of 5 stars.
