= Dagmar Lassander =

German actress

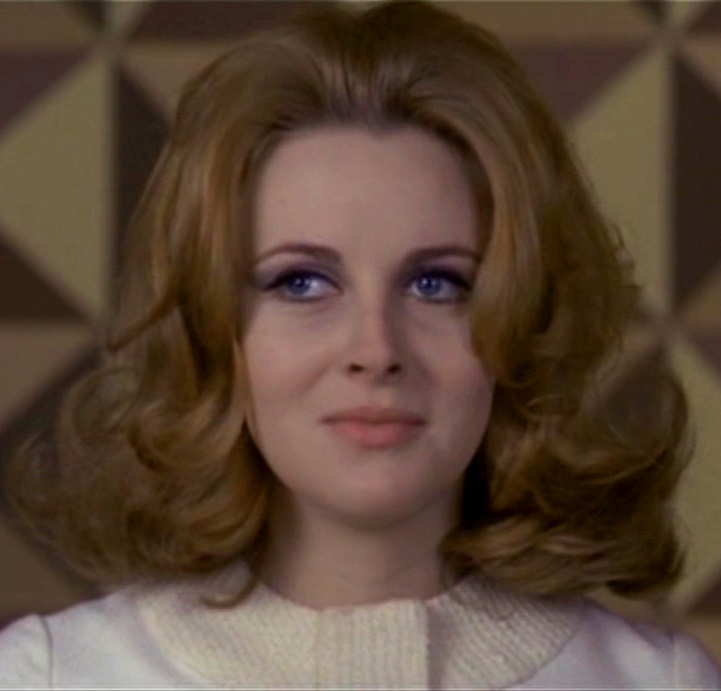
- Lassander in The Laughing Woman (1969)
- Born: Dagmar Regine Hager; 16 June 1943 (age 82); Prague, Protectorate of Bohemia and Moravia
- Occupation: Actress

Dagmar Lassander (born as Dagmar Regine Hager on 16 June 1943) is a German actress.

== Early life and career ==
She was born in Prague to a French father and Chilean-German mother, and began her career as a costume designer in the Berlin Opera. Her first role was in 1966 in Sperrbezirk by Will Tremper. Starting from 1969, she began to work regularly, especially in Italian crime, horror, and erotic movies. Her first non-erotic film was Hatchet for the Honeymoon. Her experience making the film was unpleasant: the producers required her to lose 25 pounds before filming, script revisions sidelined her character in order to give a larger role to co-star Laura Betti (who Lassander has said was "extremely rude" to her on the set), and because she only spoke German and a little English at the time, communication with the director was difficult. Lassander later successfully sued producer Manuel Caño for failing to deliver on his promise that she would be the movie's top-billed actress.

She was cast in several other gialli such as Forbidden Photos of a Lady Above Suspicion (1970), The Iguana with the Tongue of Fire (1971) and Reflections in Black (1975), as well as in two Lucio Fulci horror films, The Black Cat (1981) and The House by the Cemetery (1981), and the 1969 thriller The Laughing Woman. In the 1980s, she was also featured in several Italian TV series, the French-German feature film S.A.S. à San Salvador, and the 1984 Lamberto Bava science fiction-horror Monster Shark.

== Selected filmography ==
- Sperrbezirk (1966)
- Murderers Club of Brooklyn (1967)
- Street Acquaintances of St. Pauli (1968)
- Andrea the Nympho (1968)
- Quartett im Bett (1968) translation: Four in a Bed
- The Laughing Woman (1969)
- Un caso di coscienza (1970)
- Hatchet for the Honeymoon (1970)
- Forbidden Photos of a Lady Above Suspicion (1970)
- The Iguana with the Tongue of Fire (1971)
- Counselor at Crime (1973)
- Dandelions (1974)
- So Young, So Lovely, So Vicious... (1975)
- Reflections in Black (1975)
- Black Emanuelle 2 (1976)
- L'adolescente (1976)
- Werewolf Woman (1976)
- Nick the Sting (1976)
- Classe mista (1976)
- A Common Sense of Modesty (1976)
- The Black Corsair (1976)
- Niñas... al salón (1977)
- Return of the 38 Gang (1977)
- Flatfoot in Africa (1978)
- Seagulls Fly Low (1978)
- Sugar, Honey and Pepper (1980)
- The Black Cat (1981)
- The House by the Cemetery (1981)
- W la foca (1982)
- Occhio, malocchio, prezzemolo e finocchio (1983)
- S.A.S. à San Salvador (1983)
- Delitto in Formula Uno (1984)
- Devil Fish (1984)
- The Pleasure (1985)
- The Family (1987)
- Topo Galileo (1988)
- Tommaso (2016)
- Two Little Italians (2018)
