= Killer Nun =

- Original Italian poster
- Directed by: Giulio Berruti
- Screenplay by: Giulio Berruti; Alberto Tarallo
- Story by: Enzo Gallo
- Produced by: Enzo Gallo
- Starring: Anita Ekberg; Joe Dallesandro; Lou Castel; Alida Valli
- Cinematography: Antonio Maccoppi
- Edited by: Mario Giacco
- Music by: Alessandro Alessandroni
- Release date: 10 May 1979
- Running time: 88 minutes
- Country: Italy
- Language: Italian

Killer Nun (Italian: Suor Omicidi, lit. Sister Murders) is a 1979 Italian nunsploitation horror film directed and co-written by Giulio Berruti, co-written by Alberto Tarallo, and starring Anita Ekberg, Joe Dallesandro, Lou Castel, and Alida Valli. Its plot follows a nun who, after recovering from brain surgery, grows increasingly paranoid that her health is again declining; she begins indulging in opioids from the hospital in which she works, and spirals into addiction and madness with violent consequences. The film is loosely based on the true story of Cécile Bombeek, a middle-aged nun who committed a series of murders in a geriatric hospital in Wetteren, Belgium in 1977.

The film was originally banned in Britain as a "video nasty" and released with cuts in 1993, but was finally released uncut on DVD in the UK during 2006, after changes in British censorship policy.

== Plot ==
Sister Gertrude, a nun who works in a Catholic hospital for the elderly, returns to work after healing from surgery to remove a brain tumor. Gertrude suffers from significant anxiety following her surgery and believes that her cancer has returned, despite the hospital's lead doctor, Dr. Poirret, assuring her there is no evidence for it. The convent's Mother Superior also dismisses Gertrude's fears as hypochondria. Sister Mathieu, who has an unspoken sexual attraction to Gertrude, believes Gertrude's worry is legitimate.

Unbeknownst to the convent, Gertrude begins leading a double life, venturing into the city and pursuing sexual encounters with random men. Gertrude also begins to intravenously abuse morphine and heroin that Sister Mathieu steals for her from the hospital. Dr. Poirret notes a change in her personality as Gertrude begins to mistreat patients and revel in reading gory hagiography on the lives of tortured saints. Gertrude successfully manages to have Poirret fired from the hospital. While Gertrude is in a drug-induced state, Sister Mathieu's grandfather, a patient at the hospital, is bludgeoned to death with a lamp, and his body is defenestrated to appear as a suicide. Sister Mathieu finds Gertrude's blood-stained veil with his body but, pledging her loyalty, assures Gertrude she will not implicate her, promising to burn it to hide the evidence.

Following Dr. Poirret's dismissal, the young and handsome Dr. Patrick Rowland is hired as his replacement. During a rainstorm, Gertrude witnesses Jonathan, an elderly male patient, having sex with a young female orderly outside. Later, she awakens from a nightmare in which she suffocates Jonathan. However, she is unable to discern whether it was merely a dream or if she might have committed another murder. Jonathan's corpse is found the following morning, lying in the grass. After leading a prayer for Jonathan, Gertrude has a nervous breakdown. Shortly after, Janet, another patient, is bound and gagged by an unseen assailant before being ritualistically stabbed in the face with needles and slashed in the head and neck by a scalpel.

After Janet's body is found hanging in an elevator shaft, Dr. Poirret sedates a panicked Gertrude. When Gertrude awakens, she confronts Peter, a middle-aged patient on crutches, who claims to know who is committing the killings. Gertrude believes him, assuming she is being framed, but he will not reveal any further details. In response, she steals his crutches from him. After Peter's body is found in the boiler room, Gertrude is escorted out of the hospital and met by the Mother Superior, who scolds her for her behavior and has her sent to an isolation cell to be sedated. Meanwhile, Sister Mathieu confesses to Dr. Roland about her stealing drugs for Gertrude and threatens suicide if she is exposed. She then begins to seduce him.

Meanwhile, isolated in her cell, Sister Gertrude sits in a catatonic state, detoxing from her drug abuse. As she regains mental clarity, she recalls the first murder committed in the hospital of Sister Mathieu's grandfather. Gertrude realizes that Sister Mathieu perpetrated it as Gertrude watched in an intoxicated state. Gertrude, psychologically fragile and in a state of perpetual drug use, mistakenly assumed she was committing each of the murders when it was Sister Mathieu motivated to kill by the sexual abuse she suffered as a child by her grandfather.

== Cast ==
- Anita Ekberg as Sister Gertrude
- Joe Dallesandro as Dr. Patrick Roland
- Alida Valli as Mother Superior
- Paola Morra as Sister Mathieu
- Lou Castel as Peter
- Massimo Serato as Dr. Poirret
- Daniele Dublino as Director
- Laura Nucci as Baroness
- Alice Gherardi as Janet
- Nerina Montagnani as Josephine

== Production ==
The film is loosely based on Cécile Bombeek, a middle-aged nun who became addicted to morphine and committed more than 30 murders in a geriatric hospital in Wetteren, Belgium from 1976-1977.

== Release ==
=== Censorship ===
Killer Nun has been aligned with the nunsploitation genre, which centres on aberrant secularised behaviour from religious women. Unlike other examples of the genre, usually set in medieval or Renaissance locations, Killer Nun is firmly set in the present day, and has no pretensions to social commentary or any remarks about the role of religious women within the Church or the larger society. In the United Kingdom, Mary Whitehouse denounced it as one of the "video nasties" subgenre of violent horror cinema, which "might" adversely affect human behaviour.

Although it was originally on a "DPP list" of "objectionable" films in the United Kingdom, compiled by the Director of Public Prosecutions in 1983 as a result of the aforementioned moral panic and released with 13 seconds of cuts in 1993. Liberalised British film, video and DVD censorship policy meant that a DVD of the film was released in the UK during 2006 in its uncut form.

=== Critical response ===
The Time Out Film Guide describes this film as "a dated blend of softcore sleaze, routine blood-letting and explicable coyness" which "stars an over-the-hill Ekberg". An "excessive scenario" nevertheless has "quaint evasions". According to this review, "lesbianism is hinted at but not shown!" and "scenes of Ekberg shooting up are filmed with her back to the camera."

Nunsploitation themes of religiously enforced isolated celibacy and religious oppression are made by example of the head nuns experiencing morphine-induced fever visions and addiction to said morphine. Mother Superior says refusing to provide any help to Sister Gertrude's requests for getting medical treatment is with oppression, "it is a nun's vocation to suffer."

=== Home media ===
The film has been released on DVD in America by Blue Underground, in Germany by Koch Media and in the UK by Shameless Screen Entertainment.

Arrow Video released a new Blu-ray edition in the United States and United Kingdom on October 15, 2019.

== Sources ==
- Curti, Roberto (2022). Italian Giallo in Film and Television: A Critical History. Jefferson, North Carolina: McFarland. ISBN 978-1-476-64645-9.
- Jensen, Vickie (2012). Women Criminals: An Encyclopedia of People and Issues. Vol. 1. Santa Barbara, California: ABC-CLIO. ISBN 978-0-313-33713-0.
