= An American Love =

1994 Italian TV film

- DVD cover
- Directed by: Piero Schivazappa
- Written by: Cesare Bornazzini; Andrea Galeazzi; Piero Schivazappa
- Starring: Carlo Delle Piane; Brooke Shields
- Cinematography: Roberto D'Ettorre Piazzoli
- Music by: Amedeo Tommasi
- Release date: 1994
- Running time: 176 minutes
- Language: Italian

An American Love (Italian: Un amore americano) is a 1994 Italian romantic comedy film co-written and directed by Piero Schivazappa and starring Carlo Delle Piane and Brooke Shields.

== Plot ==
Carlo Fossalto, a University of Urbino professor arrives in the United States to teach summer classes in Italian literature at an American Midwest university. His wife has stayed home in Italy to care for family. Greta, an amateur journalist is Carlo's assistant for the summer. The relationship between Greta and Carlo evolves into romance despite the fact he is married.

== Cast ==
- Carlo Delle Piane as Carlo Fossalto
- Brooke Shields as Greta Berling
- Memè Perlini as Petri
- Graziella Polesinanti as Adele
- Kate Guimbellot as Lena
- Richard Joseph Paul as George
- Emile Levisetti as Walter

== See also ==
- List of Italian films of 1994
