= Jackie Basehart =

American actor (1951–2015)

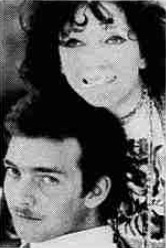
- Basehart and Valentina Cortese in 1975
- Born: John Anthony Carmine Michael Basehart; October 11, 1951; Santa Monica, California, U.S.
- Died: May 16, 2015 (aged 63); Milan, Italy
- Occupation: Actor
- Years active: 1967-1999
- Spouse: Tatiana Basehart
- Parents: Richard Basehart (father); Valentina Cortese (mother)

John Anthony Carmine Michael Basehart (October 11, 1951 – May 16, 2015) was an American actor active in Italian cinema.

== Life and career ==
Born in Santa Monica, California, Basehart was the son of actor Richard Basehart and actress Valentina Cortese.

For a few years, between the mid-1970s and the early 1980s, he was among the most requested young actors in Italian cinema, appearing in many films, although mainly in supporting roles. At that time he was hailed for "genius and recklessness" because of his excesses, which were extensively discussed by Italian gossip columns.

=== Last years and death ===
Struck by progressive supranuclear palsy, which progressively involved difficulty in swallowing, obesity, several hospitalizations and operations, and gradual paralysis, Basehart died at his home in Milan on May 16, 2015, at age 63, predeceasing his mother.

== Partial filmography ==
- "Sealed Orders" - Voyage to the Bottom of the Sea (1967)
- La linea del fiume (1976) - Owen
- Mimì Bluette... fiore del mio giardino (1976) - David Ross
- The Black Corsair (1976) - Corsaro Rosso
- The Inglorious Bastards (1978) - Berle
- The Iron Hand of the Mafia (1980) - Tony
- Sesso e volentieri (1982) - The Prince
- Viuuulentemente mia (1982) - Frank Lovejoy
- Odd Squad (1983) - Pvt. Kirk Jones
- Mai con le donne (1985)
- Festival (1996)
- The Return of Sandokan (1996) - Sir Burton
- Tea with Mussolini (1999) - Count Bernardini (final film role)
