= The Final Executioner =

- Directed by: Romolo Guerrieri
- Written by: Roberto Leoni
- Starring: William Mang; Marina Costa; Harrison Muller Jr. Margit Evelyn Newton; Woody Strode
- Music by: Carlo Maria Cordio
- Distributed by: Variety Distribution
- Release date: 1984
- Running time: 95 minutes
- Country: Italy
- Language: Italian

The Final Executioner (Italian: L' Ultimo Guerriero) is an Italian post-apocalyptic film released in 1984, directed by Romolo Guerrieri and written by Roberto Leoni. The stars included William Mang, Marina Costa and Harrison Muller.

== Synopsis ==
The resulting fallout from a nuclear war has contaminated most of the cities except for a few isolated towns. The remaining society is divided into clean and contaminated people.

Those "convicted" of being contaminated are moved to preserves for hunting by the elites - those ruled clean. An elite group has taken up the sport of hunting the contaminated people, and have killed almost 80 million.

Alan, an elite cybernetic expert (William Mang) tries to put a stop to this, as his wife is soon to be one of those being hunted. For attempting to reveal what's really happening, he is stripped of his privileges and sent to a preserve. Alan is forced to watch several of the deprivations of the hunters, and after being shot falls into a river.

He ends up in the home of an ex-cop (Woody Strode) and receives training from him. Alan and the cop then invade the citadel of the hunters. A bloodbath ensues.

== Cast ==
- William Mang as Alan Tanner
- Marina Costa as Edra
- Harrison Muller as Erasmus
- Woody Strode as Sam
- Margie Newton as Diane (credited as Margi Newton)
- Stefano Davanzati as Melvin
- Renato Miracco as Louis
- Maria Romano as Magda
- Luca Giordano as Phil
- Karl Zinny as Evan, The Boy
- Cinzia Bonfantini as Alan's Wife
- Giovanni Cianfriglia as Walker
- Tommaso Mesto

== Production ==
A certain amount of footage from this film was used for two later films, shot simultaneously in 1987: Urban Warriors and The Bronx Executioner. Woody Strode's footage as the character Sam is re-used in The Bronx Executioner, and his character is called Warren. Margit Evelyn Newton was the only actor from this film to have new scenes shot in the second.

== Reception ==
In a retrospective review, Jeremy Wheeler of AllMovie commented that despite the film having a "leather-clad, big-haired warrior on a sleek, black motorcycle carrying a samurai sword on the barren dunes of the future" sounding "genius enough" the film still contained "all the pitfalls of the cheap Italian post-apocalyptic flicks of this time with little of the gratuitous nature that the best of the bunch have been graced with." Kim Newman found this movie to be the "best of a bad lot" of the group of cheap, Italian post apocalyptic movies of the 1980s. Creature Feature gave the movies 1.5 out of 5 stars, noting that the violence on both sides makes it hard to feel empathy for Mang and that the direction was lacking elan. TV Guide found the movie to better than most of the genre, and the Strode's performance was impressive, but gave the movie one of five stars labeling it a time killer.
