= Wetteren =

- Municipality
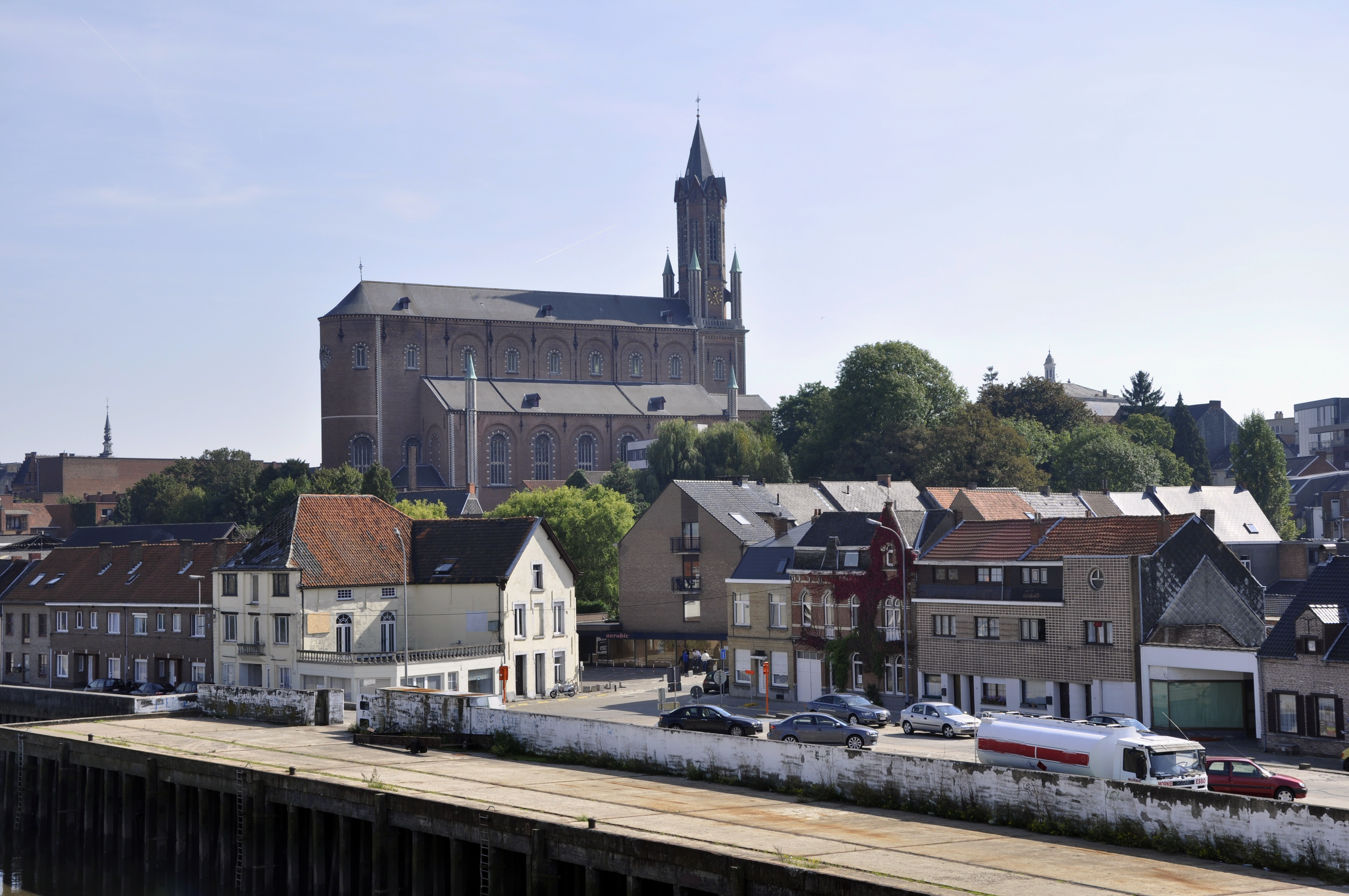

- Flag Coat of arms

- Location of Wetteren in East Flanders
- Interactive map of Wetteren
- Location in Belgium
- Coordinates: 51°00′N 03°53′E
- Country: Belgium
- Community: Flemish Community
- Region: Flemish Region
- Province: East Flanders
- Arrondissement: Dendermonde

Government
  - Mayor: Albert De Geyter (CD&V)
  - Governing parties: CD&V, spa plus, Groen & CO, EEN Wetteren

Area
  - Total: 37.02 km^{2} (14.29 sq mi)

Population (2018-01-01)
  - Total: 25,477
  - Density: 688.2/km^{2} (1,782/sq mi)
- Postal codes: 9230
- NIS code: 42025
- Area codes: 09
- Website: www.wetteren.be

Wetteren (Dutch pronunciation: [ˈʋɛtərə(n)]) is a municipality in the Belgian province of East Flanders, comprising the towns of Massemen, Westrem and Wetteren proper. In 2021 it had a population of 26,206. Its total area is 36.68 km^{2}.

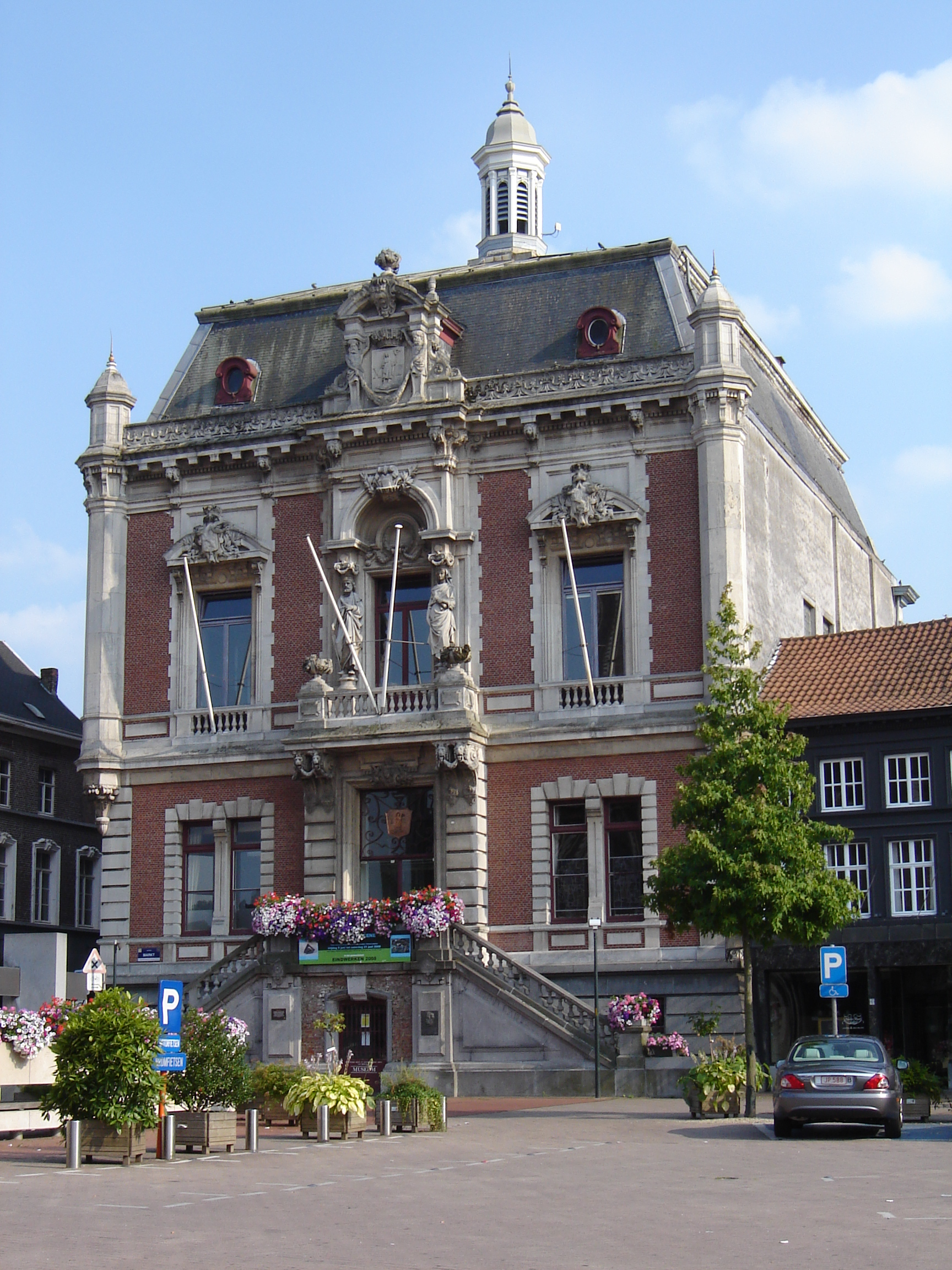
Wetteren town hall

== Educational institutions ==
- Gemeenschapsonderwijs Noordlaan 10, Wetteren
- Basischool Scheppers Cooppallaan 82, Wetteren
- Basisschool Sint-Gertrudis F. Leirensstraat 31, Wetteren
- Basisschool Sint-Jozef Wegvoeringstraat 59 a, Wetteren
- Scheppersinstituut Cooppaallaan 128, Wetteren
- Sint-Gertrudiscollege Wegvoeringstraat 21, Wetteren
- Sint-Jozefinstituut Wegvoeringstraat 59 a, Wetteren
- Mariagaard Oosterzelsesteenweg 80, Wetteren
- School Des Esmee Lebon Et Amber Mamber AmberMaberstraat 4

== Notable people ==
- Julien De Wilde (b. Wetteren, 7 January 1967), businessman
- Émile Pierre Joseph Storms (1846-1918) Explorer of Congo Free State, General
- Cecile Bombeek, serial killer
- Ben Mertens, snooker player
