= Richard Basehart =

American actor (1914–1984)

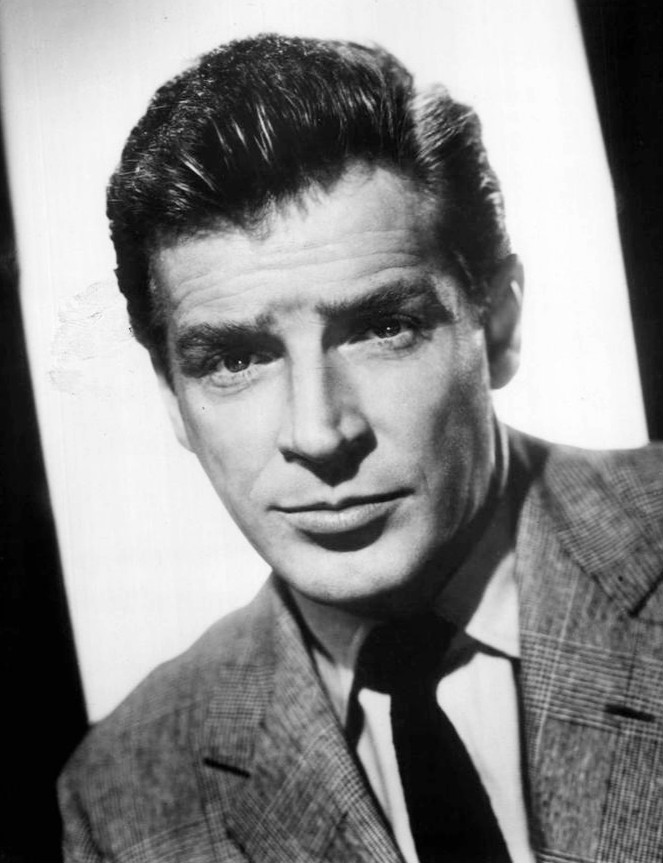
- Basehart in 1969
- Born: John Richard Basehart; August 31, 1914; Zanesville, Ohio, U.S.
- Died: September 17, 1984 (aged 70); Los Angeles, California, U.S.
- Burial place: Westwood Village Memorial Park Cemetery
- Occupation: Actor
- Years active: 1942–1984
- Spouses: Stephanie Klein (m. 1940; died 1950) Valentina Cortese (m. 1951; div. 1960) Diana Lotery (m. 1962)
- Children: 3, including Jackie

John Richard Basehart (August 31, 1914 – September 17, 1984) was an American actor. Known for his "deep, resonant baritone voice and craggy good looks," he was active in film, theatre and television from 1947 until 1983. He won two National Board of Review Awards, for his performances in Fourteen Hours (1951) and Moby Dick (1956), and was nominated for a BAFTA Award for Time Limit (1957).

Basehart was known to television viewers for starring as Admiral Harriman Nelson on the television science-fiction drama Voyage to the Bottom of the Sea (1964–68). He also portrayed Wilton Knight in the pilot episode of the TV series Knight Rider (1982), and provided the narration that was heard during the opening credits throughout the entire series. He appeared in a number of British and Italian films in the mid-1950s, including Federico Fellini's La Strada and Il Bidone. He also narrated a wide range of television and film projects.

In 1960, Basehart received a star on the Hollywood Walk of Fame for his contributions to the motion-picture industry.

== Early life and education ==
Basehart was born in Zanesville, Ohio, one of five children born to Mae (née Wetherald) and Harry T. Basehart, a former actor turned editor of The Zanesville Times-Signal. He worked as a reporter at his father's newspaper and as a radio announcer in Zanesville and Columbus, Ohio, before entering a stage career at the Hedgerow Theatre in Pennsylvania, where he met his first wife Stephanie Klein, a costume designer.

== Career ==
=== Theatre and film ===
Basehart made his Broadway debut in 1938. He won the 1945 New York Drama Critics' Circle Award for Most Promising Young Actor for his starring role in John Patrick's play The Hasty Heart, which was adapted into a 1949 film of the same name. He made his film debut with Repeat Performance (1947). So confident was Eagle-Lion Films in his performance that the film was first screened in his hometown.

He soon appeared as the killer in the film noir classic He Walked by Night (1948) for Eagle-Lion, then he appeared as a psychotic member of the Hatfield clan in Roseanna McCoy (1949), as Maximilien Robespierre in the period film noir Reign of Terror (1949), as a timid husband in Tension (1950), as Ishmael in Moby Dick (1956), in the drama Decision Before Dawn (1951), George S. Healey in Titanic (1953) and as Ivan in The Brothers Karamazov (1958).

One of his most notable film roles was the acrobat and clown known as "the Fool" in the acclaimed Italian film La Strada (1954), directed by Federico Fellini. He starred in a French-Australian drama The Restless and the Damned, portrayed the title character in Hitler (1962), and a high priest in Kings of the Sun (1963).

Basehart played a supporting role as a doctor in the feature film Rage (1972), a theatrical feature starring and directed by George C. Scott. Also in the 1970s, he co-starred in Chato's Land (1972) and The Island of Dr. Moreau (1977). In 1979, he appeared as a Russian diplomat with Peter Sellers in Being There.

=== Television ===
From 1964 to 1968, Basehart played the lead role, Admiral Harriman Nelson, on Irwin Allen's first foray into science-fiction television, Voyage to the Bottom of the Sea.

Basehart appeared in the pilot episode of the television series Knight Rider as billionaire Wilton Knight. He is the narrator at the beginning of the show's credits. He accepted the lead role in the 1962 film Hitler. He appeared in "Probe 7, Over and Out", an episode of The Twilight Zone, Hawaii Five-O, and as Hannibal Applewood, an abusive schoolteacher in Little House on the Prairie in 1976. In 1972, Basehart appeared in the Columbo episode "Dagger of the Mind", in which Honor Blackman and he played a husband-and-wife theatrical team who accidentally kill Sir Roger Haversham, the producer of their rendition of Macbeth.

Basehart made a few TV movies, including Sole Survivor (1970) and The Birdmen (1971). Both were based on true stories during World War II.

=== Narration ===
Basehart narrated a wide range of television and movie projects. As well as appearing onscreen as Ishmael, he also read extended passages of Melville's prose while relating the abridged story for John Huston and Ray Bradbury's version of Moby Dick.

In 1964, he narrated the David Wolper documentary about the Kennedy assassination, Four Days in November. In 1980, Basehart narrated the miniseries written by Peter Arnett called Vietnam: The Ten Thousand Day War that covered Vietnam and its battles from the Japanese surrender on September 2, 1945, to the final American embassy evacuation on April 30, 1975.

One month before his death, Basehart narrated a poem during the extinguishing of the flame at the closing ceremonies of the 1984 Summer Olympics.

== Personal life ==
Basehart was married three times. His first wife, Stephanie Klein, died following a brain operation in July 1950. He next married Italian actress Valentina Cortese in 1951, with whom he had one son, actor Jackie Basehart; the couple divorced in 1960.

In 1962, he married his third wife, Diana Lotery, with whom he had two children. He and Diana remained married until his death in 1984.

== Death ==
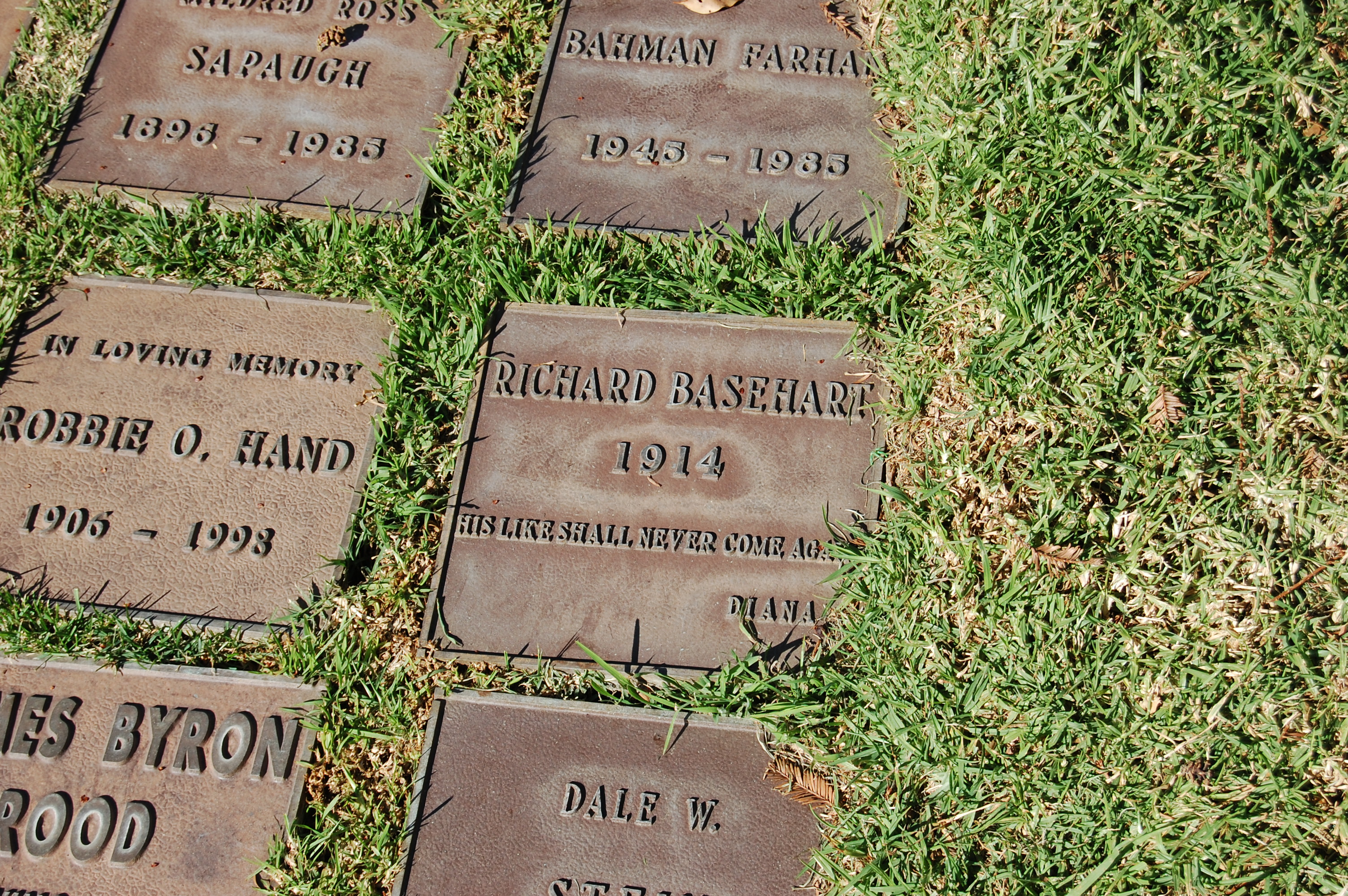
Richard Basehart's grave

Basehart died in Los Angeles on September 17, 1984, following a series of strokes. He was 70 years old. His body was cremated, and the ashes interred at Westwood Village Memorial Park Cemetery in Los Angeles.

== Filmography ==
=== Film ===
Year	Title	Role	Notes
1947	Repeat Performance	William Williams	
1947	Cry Wolf	James Demarest	
1948	He Walked by Night	Roy Martin / Roy Morgan	
1949	Roseanna McCoy	Mounts Hatfield	
1949	Reign of Terror	Maximilian Robespierre	
1950	Tension	Warren Quimby / Paul Sothern	
1950	Outside the Wall	Larry Nelson	
1950	Side Street	Bank Teller	Uncredited
1951	Fourteen Hours	Robert Cosick	
1951	The House on Telegraph Hill	Alan Spender	
1951	Fixed Bayonets!	Corporal Denno	
1951	Decision Before Dawn	Lieutenant Dick Rennick	
1953	Titanic	George S.Healey / Father Thomas Byles	
1954	The Stranger's Hand	Joe Hamstringer	
1954	Angels of Darkness	Bit Part	Uncredited
1954	The Good Die Young	Joe Halsey	
1954	La Strada	The Fool	
1954	Avanzi di galera	Dr. Stefano Luprandi	
1955	Canyon Crossroads	Larry Kendall	
1955	Le avventure di Cartouche	Count Jacques de Maudy	
1955	Golden Vein	Stefano Manfredi	
1955	Il bidone	Raul "Picasso"	
1956	The Extra Day	Joe Blake	
1956	Moby Dick	Ishmael	
1956	The Intimate Stranger	Reginald 'Reggie' Wilson	
1957	Miracles of Thursday	Martino	
1957	Time Limit	Major Harry Cargill	
1958	The Brothers Karamazov	Ivan Karamazov	
1958	Love and Troubles	Paolo Martelli	
1959	The Restless and the Damned	George Rancourt	
1959	Jons und Erdme	Wittkuhn, der Schmied	
1960	Five Branded Women	Captain Eric Reinhardt	
1960	Portrait in Black	Howard Mason	
1960	For the Love of Mike	Father Francis Phelan	
1960	Passport to China	Don Benton	
1962	Hitler	Adolf Hitler	
1962	Savage Guns	Steve Fallon	
1963	Kings of the Sun	Ah Min	
1965	The Satan Bug	Dr. Gregor Hoffman	
1969	Love Is a Funny Thing	Himself	Cameo appearance
1969	Giotto	Narrator (voice)	
1972	Chato's Land	Nye Buell	
1972	Rage	Dr. Roy Caldwell	
1976	Mansion of the Doomed	Dr. Leonard Chaney	
1977	The Island of Dr. Moreau	Sayer of the Law	
1978	The Great Bank Hoax	Manny Benchly	
1979	Being There	Vladimir Skrapinov	

=== Television ===
Year	Title	Role	Notes
1957	Studio One	Matt Donovan	2 episodes
1957–60	Playhouse 90	Martin Lambert / David Connelly / Lionel Amblin / Himself - Host	4 episodes
1958	Dick Powell's Zane Grey Theatre	David Manning	Episode: "Medal for Valor"
1960	DuPont Show of the Month	Dr. George Ferguson	Episode: "Men in White"
1960	Shangri-La	Hugh Conway	Television film
1961	The Play of the Week	Stranger	Episode: "He Who Gets Slapped"
1961	The Light That Failed	Dick Heldar	Television film
1961	Rawhide	Todd Stone	Season 4 Episode 7: "The Black Sheep"
1962	The Paradine Case	Anthony Keane	Television film
1962	Theatre '62	Anthony Keane	Episode: "The Paradine Case"
1962	The DuPont Show of the Week	Narrator	Episode: "D-Day"
1962	Naked City	Lester Bergson	Episode: "Dust Devil on a Quiet Street"
1962	The Alfred Hitchcock Hour	Phillip Townsend / David Webber	Season 1 Episode 9: "The Black Curtain"
1963	The Alfred Hitchcock Hour	Miles Crawford	Season 2 Episode 7: "Starring the Defense"
1963	Route 66	Julian Roebuck	Episode: "You Can't Pick Cotton in Tahiti"
1963	The Dick Powell Theatre	Judge Zachary	Episode: "The Judge"
1963	Combat!	Captain Steiner	2 episodes
1963	Ben Casey	Mark Cassidy	Episode: "Light Up the Dark Corners"
1963	Arrest and Trial	Alexander Stafford	Episode: "Inquest Into a Bleeding Heart"
1963	The Twilight Zone	Adam Cook	Episode: "Probe 7, Over and Out"
1964–68	Voyage to the Bottom of the Sea	Admiral Harriman "Harry" Nelson	110 episodes
1965	Lost in Space	Shakespeare-Reading Tape Recorder Voice	Episode: "The Derelict"
1968	The Rise and Fall of the Third Reich	Narrator	Documentary
1969	Hans Brinker	Dr. Boekman	Television film
1970	Sole Survivor	Brigadier General Russell Hamner	Television film
1970	The Andersonville Trial	Henry Wirz	Television film
1970	Ironside	Noel Seymour	Episode: "Noel's Gonna Fly"
1970	Dan August	Professor Theodore Rye	Episode: "Quadrangle for Death"
1971	Gunsmoke	Captain Aron Sligo	Episode: "Captain Sligo"
1971	City Beneath the Sea	the President	Television film
1971	They've Killed President Lincoln!	Host / Narrator	Television film
1971	The Birdmen	Schiller	Television film
1971	The Death of Me Yet	Robert Barnes	Television film
1972	Assignment: Munich	Major Barney Caldwell	Television film
1972	The Bold Ones: The New Doctors	Dr. Stephen McLayne	Episode: "Is This Operation Necessary?"
1972	The Bounty Man	Angus Keough	Television film
1972	Columbo	Nicholas Frame	Episode: "Dagger of the Mind"
1973	Hawaii Five-O	Bernard Murdock	Episode: "The Odd Lot Caper"
1973	And Millions Will Die	Dr. Douglas Pruitt	Television film
1973	Maneater	Carl Brenner	Television film
1974	Marcus Welby, M.D.	Reece Sutton / Professor Andrew Kirkcastle	2 episodes
1974	The First Woman President	Woodrow Wilson	Television film
1975	Judgment: The Court Martial of Lieutenant William Calley	George Latimer	Television film
1975	The American Parade	Lambdin Milligan	Episode: "The Case Against Milligan"
1975	Medical Story	Dr. Charles Galpin	Episode: "The God Syndrome"
1975	Joe Forrester	Al Morgan	Episode: "No Probable Cause"
1975	Valley Forge	General George Washington	Television film
1976	The Streets of San Francisco	Bishop Tim Farrow	Episode: "Requiem for Murder"
1976	Little House on the Prairie	Hannibal Applewood	Episode: "Troublemaker"
1976	Time Travelers	Dr. Joshua Henderson	Television film
1976	21 Hours at Munich	Chancellor Willy Brandt	Television film
1976	Flood!	John Cutler	Television film
1977	Stonestreet: Who Killed the Centerfold Model?	Elliott Osborn	Television film
1978	How the West Was Won	Colonel Harry Albert Flint	3 episodes
1978	Once Upon a Classic	King Arthur	Episode: "A Connecticut Yankee in King Arthur's Court"
1978	The Critical List	Matt Kinsella	Television film
1978	W.E.B.	Gus Dunlap	5 episodes
1979	The Rebels	Duke of Kentland	Television miniseries
1979	Greatest Heroes of the Bible	Johtan	Episode: "Tower of Babel"
1979	The Christmas Songs		Television film
1980	Marilyn: The Untold Story	Johnny Hyde	Television film
1981	Vega$	J. Terrance Wainwright	Episode: "Set Up"
1981	Masada	Narrator, Modern Day Scene	Television miniseries
1981	The Love Boat	Stan Ellis	Episode: "Chef's Special/Beginning Anew/Kleinschmidt"
1981	Mr. Merlin	Herbert Montrose	Episode: "A Moment in Camelot"
1982–86	Knight Rider	Narrator (voice) / Wilton Knight	Episode: "Knight of the Phoenix: Part 1" (Note: as Wilton Knight); 83 episodes (Note: as Narrator)
1983	Tales of the Unexpected	Slade	Episode: "The Turn of the Tide"
1983	The Crowded Life	Narrator	Television film

== Awards and nominations ==
Year	Award	Category	Title	Result	Ref
1951	National Board of Review Awards	Best Actor	Fourteen Hours	Won	
1956	National Board of Review Awards	Best Supporting Actor	Moby Dick	Won	
1958	BAFTA Awards	Best Foreign Actor	Time Limit	Nominated	
1960	Hollywood Walk of Fame	Motion Pictures	-	Inducted	
