= Death Hunt (1977 film) =

- Directed by: Tano Cimarosa
- Written by: Tano Cimarosa
- Starring: Al Cliver; Ninetto Davoli
- Cinematography: Giovanni Raffaldi
- Music by: Alberto Baldan Bembo
- Distributed by: Variety Distribution
- Release date: 1977
- Language: Italian

Death Hunt (Italian: No alla violenza) is a 1977 Italian "poliziottesco" film written and directed by Tano Cimarosa and starring Al Cliver and Ninetto Davoli.

== Cast ==
- Al Cliver as Inspector Ettore Moretti
- Ninetto Davoli as Mario
- Martine Carell as Martine
- Tano Cimarosa as Tano
- Federico Boido as Duilio Brogi
- Zaira Zoccheddu as Livia
- Nico dei Gabbiani
- Guia Lauri Filzi as Rosa
- Massimo Mollica as Corsi
- Uccio Golino as Marru
- Paola Quattrini as Paola Corsi

== Reception ==
Film critic Giovanni Buttafava referred to the film as "a Death Wish of sorts, halfway between the average Turkish epic and a naïve Fassbinder film." Film critic Roberto Curti called it "simply disarming in its naiveness."

== See also ==
- List of Italian films of 1977
