= Licia Colò =

Italian TV hostess and journalist

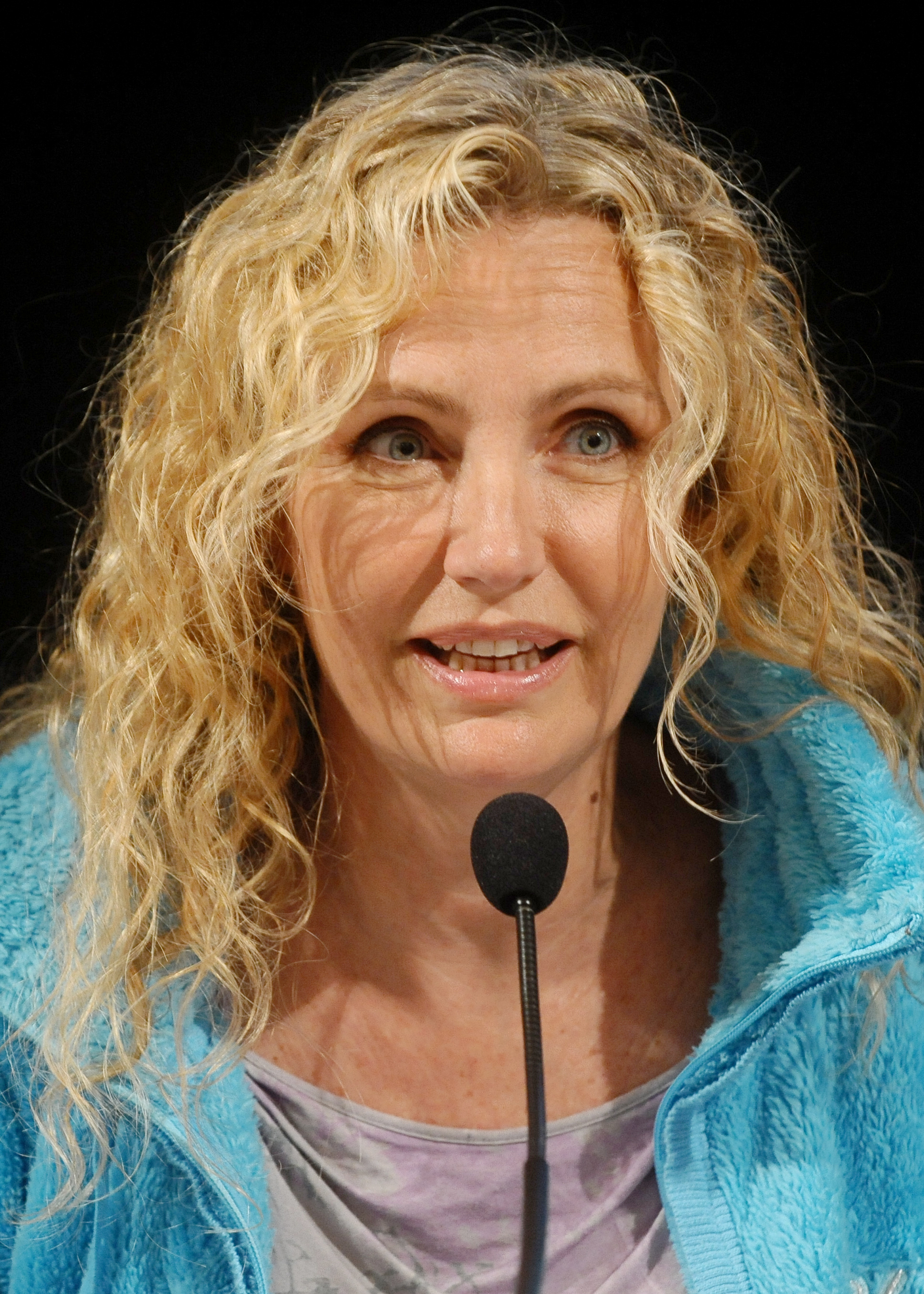
Licia Colò - Trento Film Festival 2014

Licia Colò (born July 7, 1962) is an Italian TV hostess and journalist.

== Biography ==
Colò was born in Verona, Veneto.

She began her television career in 1982 as either host or author of various shows for RAI, the Italian state television, and Mediaset, Silvio Berlusconi's network. Among these, L'Arca di Noè, Paese che vai and La compagnia dei viaggiatori, which forecast her passion for shows about travels. In 1989 she had a secondary role in the horror movie La casa delle anime erranti.

She has been working exclusively for RAI since 1996, hosting documentary-based shows Geo & Geo, King Kong and Il pianeta delle meraviglie. Starting in 2001, she has hosted Alle falde del Kilimangiaro, dedicated to travel documentaries, on RAI 3. Colò has also written several books documenting her travel experiences.
