= Margit Evelyn Newton =

South Tyrolean Italian actress (born 1962)

- Born: Margit Gansbacher; October 12, 1962 (age 63); Bolzano, Italy
- Occupations: Actress, model
- Notable work: Hell of the Living Dead; Quiet Days in Clichy

Margit Evelyn Newton (born Margit Gansbacher in 1962) is an Italian actress who appeared in fourteen films between 1979 and 1990.

Newton is perhaps best known for her performance in the 1980 zombie film Hell of the Living Dead.

== Life and career ==
Newton used the name Margie Moreau in her first two films, 1979's La Vedova del trullo and 1980's The Iron Hand of the Mafia. She acted in The Last Hunter, billed as Margi Eveline Newton, and in The Final Executioner (1984) and The Bronx Executioner (1989), billed as Margie Newton. Newton also appeared in Claude Chabrol's Quiet Days in Clichy (1990).

In addition to her acting work, Newton also modeled in the Italian men's magazines Playmen and Ginfilm between 1984 and 1987.

Newton retired from show business in the 1990s to marry and raise a family.

== Filmography ==
- La Vedova del trullo (1979)
- The Iron Hand of the Mafia (1980)
- Hell of the Living Dead (1980)
- The Last Hunter (1980)
- The Final Executioner (1984)
- The Adventures of Hercules (1985)
- The Bronx Executioner (1989)
- Act of Revenge (1989)
- I Won the New Year's Lottery (1989)
- Quiet Days in Clichy (1990)
- Il piacere di piacere (2002)
- Il siero della vanità (2003)
- La ninfetta e il maggiordomo (2006)
- Eternity (2023)
