= Hell of the Living Dead =

Film by Bruno Mattei

- Italian theatrical release poster
- Directed by: Bruno Mattei
- Screenplay by: Claudio Fragasso; José María Cunillés
- Starring: Margit Evelyn Newton; Franco Garofalo; Selan Karay; José Gras
- Cinematography: John Cabrera
- Edited by: Claudio Borroni
- Music by: Goblin
- Production companies: Beatrice Film; Film Dara
- Release dates: 17 November 1980 (Spain); August 1981 (Italy)
- Running time: 100 minutes
- Countries: Italy; Spain

Hell of the Living Dead (Italian: Virus) is a 1980 horror film directed by Bruno Mattei (credited as Vincent Dawn). The film is set in a laboratory in Papua New Guinea that releases a dangerous chemical, turning the technicians and locals into zombies. A French news reporter (Margit Evelyn Newton) and her crew land on the island to investigate.

Hell of the Living Dead was a project developed by producers and given to director Bruno Mattei, who attempted to create a film similar to 1978's Dawn of the Dead but lighter in tone. It was shot in five weeks in Spain with a script that was not Mattei's first choice and a score by the band Goblin, taken from other film scores that the band had performed. The film generally received negative reviews, noting bad dialogue and being derivative of Dawn of the Dead.

== Plot ==
At a top-secret chemical research facility called Hope Center #1, a rat causes a chemical leak and dies. As two workers investigate, the rat suddenly comes back to life and kills one of the men, who likewise revives and attacks his co-workers. Subsequently, the entire staff of the plant turns into flesh-eating zombies.

A four-man team of Interpol commandos, consisting of Lt. Mike London, Osborne, Zantoro, and Vincent, are deployed to eliminate a group of eco-terrorists who have taken hostages at the US Embassy in Barcelona, Spain. The terrorists demand the closing of all the Hope Centers, which both the government and the military deny exist. Under orders of the local authorities, the press does not publicize the terrorists' demands or mention the disaster at Hope Center. After another team pumps tear gas into the building, Lt. London and his three commandos burst in, killing the terrorists.

Once the mission is completed, the team loses contact with Hope Center #1. Thinking that terrorists have infiltrated the complex, the team flies to Papua New Guinea. Journalist Lia Rousseau and her cameraman Max, who are investigating a series of mysterious, violent attacks on the locals get their car broken down at some abandoned buildings. Their friends Josie, Josie's husband, and their little son are killed by zombies, just as the team arrives. Lia and Max go with the team, and while stopping at a native village, they witness a group of zombies that suddenly show up to eat the rest of the villagers.

The commandos and the journalists travel through the New Guinea jungle in the commando's jeep, trying to survive while evading the zombies. The group takes refuge at an abandoned plantation, only to come under attack from the zombie residents. For some reason Osborne decides to put his weapons down and play with things in a room, where he is eaten by zombies, forcing the other survivors to flee.

The team battle their way to a beach, escape by raft, and finally arrive at Hope Center #1, where they find all of the workers either dead or roaming the facility as zombies. Max and Zantoro are killed when they are pulled into an elevator filled with zombies, and London gets infected.

While Lia and Vincent separate from London who turns, they learn about the experimental chemical accidentally released, which is causing the zombie infestation. Lia theorizes that the chemical, code named "Operation Sweet Death", has been invented to curb the Third World population by driving it into eating each other. She vows to tell the world, but a horde of zombies – including their now zombified comrades – close in and attack Vincent and Lia. As Vincent is pulled away and eaten, one of the zombies rips Lia's tongue out, then pushes its fist into her mouth and up into her skull, causing her eyeballs to pop out of her head.

Sometime later, the zombie contagion has spread beyond New Guinea's borders and throughout the world. While politicians and scientists dispute the matter, a young couple in the developed world is attacked and devoured by a horde of zombies in a city park.

== Cast ==
- Margit Evelyn Newton as Lia Rousseau
- Franco Garofalo as Zantoro (credited as Frank Garfield)
- José Gras as Lieutenant Mike London (credited as Robert O'Neil)
- Selan Karay as Vincent
- Gabriel Renom (credited as Gaby Renom) as Max
- Josep Lluís Fonoll as Osborne
- Piero Fumelli as Coroner On TV
- Bruno Boni as Reporter
- Patrizia Costa as Josie
- Cesare Di Vito as Newscaster
- Sergio Pislar as Technician Lawson
- Bernard Seray as Technician Fowler
- Pep Ballenster as Josie's Husband
- Víctor Israel as Zombie Priest
- Joaquin Blanco as Professor Barrett
- Bernard Seray as Professor Barrett's Assistant
- Attilio Pelegatti as Man In Bar
- Esther Mesina as Woman In Bar
- Antonio Spinnato as Zombie In Park
- Genarrino Papagalli as Mr. Farrara, TV Executive
- Antonio Molino Rojo as SWAT Leader
- Tito Lucchetti as Terrorist Leader
- Óscar Daniel as Josie's Son
- Josefina Tapias as Old Lady Zombie

== Production ==
When George A. Romero's Dawn of the Dead (1978) was released in Italy, it was retitled Zombi for the Italian audiences. Following this release, Italian film production would enter a vogue period of zombie films that would often be hybridized with other popular genres. These would include Lucio Fulci's Zombi 2 (1979), Antonio Margheriti's Cannibal Apocalypse (1980) and Hell of the Living Dead (1980). Director Bruno Mattei said that the production began as a specific request from the producer. Mattei planned to make a film inspired by Dawn of the Dead, but wanted a lighter tone for the film. He said that initially two screenplays were written, and that the producers rejected the screenplay which Mattei preferred. The film was Mattei's first to be made under the name Vincent Dawn, a request made specifically by the film's Spanish production side.

Claudio Fragasso said that he wrote Hell of the Living Dead with Rossella Drudi, his frequent co-scripter. Fragasso wanted the film differentiate itself from other zombie films being made during the period. After watching Dawn of the Dead, he tried to make a film similar to other American productions as well, comparing his script to films like Soylent Green (1973) as well as envisioning the film as "an undead epic, a kind of Apocalypse Now".

Hell of the Living Dead was shot in 5 weeks. The film includes stock footage to suggest that the film was set in New Guinea. Fragasso stated that when the crew arrived in Barcelona to shoot the film they found they had no money and had to improvise and rewrite the previous script. The production had this footage from the beginning of shooting the film and had rebuilt some of the locations from the stock footage in Spain, where the film was shot. Fragasso commented on the use of stock footage in the film as producers wanted to reuse footage they had, which led to Mattei adding footage of a documentary New Guinea, Island of Cannibals into the film.

Among the cast was Margit Evelyn Newton as Lia. Newton recalled that she felt a great sense of responsibility at the time, playing the film's protagonist and felt nervous in a scene involving nudity in front of the indigenous people. She asked that everyone be removed from the set, with only indispensable cast and crew remaining. The scene was shot in one day. Parts of the film were improvised on set, such as when a character enters a room imitating Gene Kelly in his film Singin' in the Rain (1952). The score is credited to the band Goblin. Most of the score is taken from other film scores Goblin performed, such as Dawn of the Dead and Contamination (1980). Mattei was a fan of their music and secured rights to it for the film through Carlo Bizio. Fragasso stated that the music was from other films and from their album Roller (1976) as asking Goblin to develop a new score for the film would have been too expensive.

== Release ==
Hell of the Living Dead was released in Spain on November 17, 1980, and in Italy in August 1981 and released in the United States in 1983. It was described as "moderately profitable" in Glenn Kay's book Zombie Movies: The Ultimate Guide. It has been released under several titles, including Virus, Night of the Zombies and Zombie Creeping Flesh.

== Critical reception ==
In Italy, the film received unremarkable reviews in Paese Sera, l'Unità, Il Giorno, and Stampa Sera while generally more positive reviews in Corriere d'Informazione and Il Giornale Nuovo.

From contemporary reviews, the film received negative reviews in Stampa Sera, The Baltimore Sun, and Evening Sentinel. Both La Stampa and Steve Jenkins of The Monthly Film Bulletin found the film was unintentionally amusing, with Jenkins highlighting a "low-budget UN meeting consisting of a handful of delegates hurling pieces of paper at each other." Jenkins continued that the possibility of any subversive subtext involving Third World victims corrupted by scientific research was "truly buried here in an orgy of flesh chewing and vomiting, as well as dialogue that beggars belief." Jenkins and the three newspapers found the use of stock footage poorly integrated into the film. Alan Cookman of the Evening Sentinel highlighted that it was "inexpertly and indiscriminately shoved in to persuade us that we are overseas" while Jenkins noted "ludicrous attempts to dub speech on to stock footage." Reviews also deemed the film to be in poor taste and commented on the origin of the film. The reviewer in La Stampa stating that this Italian and Spanish co-production was made to masquerade itself as a Hollywood production with cast members such as Margit Evelyn Newton listed in the credits having a similar name to Olivia Newton-John. Alan Cookman of the Evening Sentinel was shocked it was even released to theaters in the United Kingdom, concluding that it was "a right load of Italian garbage" and "not just worthless foreign rubbish, it is sick foreign rubbish."

From retrospective reviews, Glenn Kay in his book Zombie Movies: The Ultimate Guide commented on the poor quality dialogue, as well as bad shot composition—with scenes changing from day to night between cuts, slow pacing and overacting. Scott Aaron Stine, author of The Gorehound's Guide to Splatter Films of the 1980s, called the film a "shameless" retread of Dawn of the Dead and Zombi 2, criticized the overuse of mismatched stock footage, and concluded the picture was for "diehard splatterpunk and zombie film completists only." Donald Guarisco of AllMovie described the film as "cluelessly bad" with a script of "dreadful characterizations and dialogue," noting that it would be enjoyed by fans of cult and trash cinema. John Kenneth Muir (Horror Films of the 1980s) stated the film was not enjoyable to watch and that it added little originality to the zombie genre in the vein of other films such as The Return of the Living Dead and Day of the Dead. Both AllMovie and Muir noted the film's similarity to Dawn of the Dead, with Muir referring to it as "perhaps the most blatant rip-off of Dawn of the Dead ever produced".

== Legacy ==
Mattei later expressed that he felt the film's dialogue was "pretty stupid" and that like all his films, he would reshoot it if possible. When asked how she felt about the film in 2013, actress Margit Evelyn Newton responded that "Obviously seeing it now, I would change some things. But that is okay. Virus has helped me get more work." Fragasso commented on the film later saying that the film "designed with lots of love, but in the end it came out a test tube baby, a kind of abortion [...] But I'm satisfied with the end results."

In 2020, a horror film was released titled Corona Zombies which largely was created by taking footage of Hell of the Living Dead dubbing over the original film with new dialogue.

== See also ==
- List of horror films of 1980
- List of Italian films of 1980
- List of Spanish films of 1980
